= Annabelle (doll) =

Haunted doll and fictional character

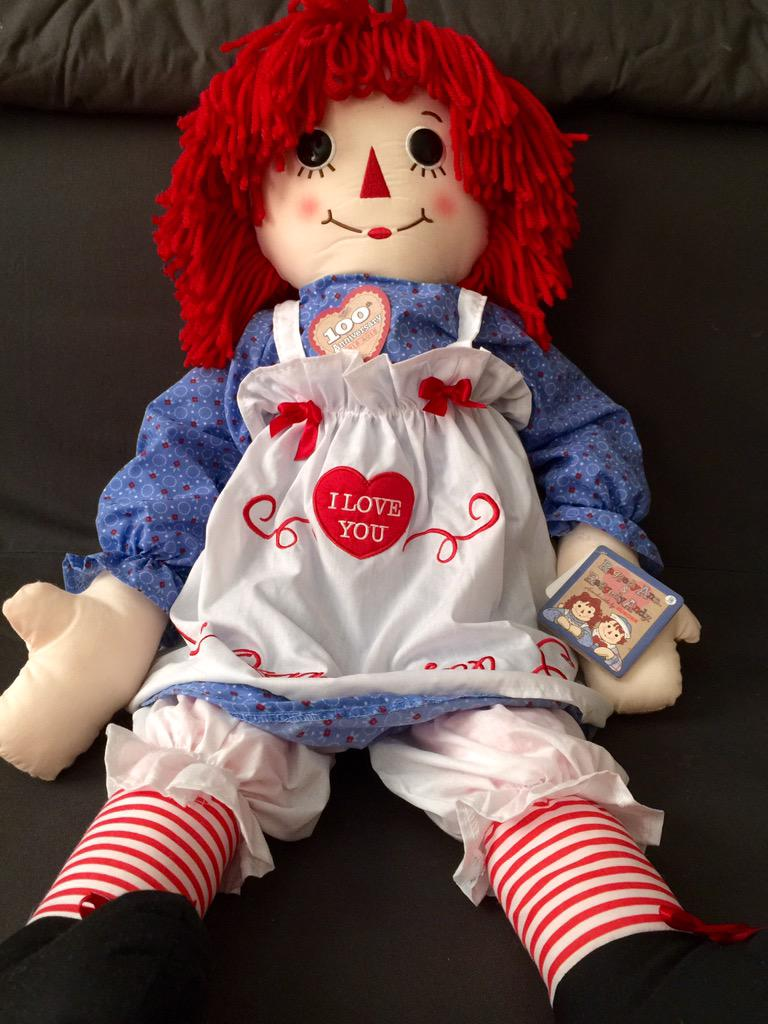
A Raggedy Ann doll

Annabelle is a Raggedy Ann doll that is claimed to be haunted. According to paranormal investigators Ed and Lorraine Warren, the doll frightened its owner, so it was moved to their (now closed) museum in Connecticut during the 1970s. Academics and science writers have dismissed their claims as myth and folklore. A character based on the Warrens' story is one of the antagonists that appear in the fictional horror film franchise The Conjuring Universe.

== History ==
According to the Warrens, they were given the doll in the 1970s by a 28-year-old student nurse named Donna from Hartford, Connecticut who claimed the doll could move by itself and exhibited malicious and frightening behavior. The Warrens said a psychic medium had told the student nurse and her roommate that the doll had been taken over by the spirit of a dead seven-year-old girl named Annabelle. The Warrens claimed the doll was demonically possessed and subsequently placed it in a display box at their Occult Museum in Monroe, Connecticut.

Over time, the Warrens publicized various claims about Annabelle: supposedly the doll inflicted "psychic slashes" that drew blood from victims, caused a priest who insulted the doll to run his car into a tree, and stabbed a homicide detective, forcing him into early retirement.

The story of the doll was featured in the 1980 book The Demonologist, written by Gerald Brittle, the result of what the author has claimed was "an exclusive deal" with Lorraine Warren. In 2009, Tony DeRosa-Grund‘s Evergreen Media Group made a series of deals with the Warrens for rights to exploit their stories. In 2014, Warner Bros.' New Line Cinema claimed rights to the Annabelle story in connection with chapters from The Demonologist which they say "were acquired from Mrs. Warren and/or [Tony] Spera and Graymalkin Media.” The Annabelle doll character based on the Warrens' story was featured in The Conjuring Universe, a film series that includes the following: Annabelle (2014), Annabelle: Creation (2017), and Annabelle Comes Home (2019). The producers did not use the likeness of Raggedy Ann, partially due to potential trademark issues and partially to make the doll's appearance more unsettling for a horror film; its appearance has been described as a "terrifying porcelain doll that is disfigured and immediately menacing". The character makes its first appearance in James Wan's The Conjuring (2013) and additionally makes brief appearances in his sequel The Conjuring 2 (2016) and Michael Chaves' The Curse of La Llorona (2019), The Conjuring: The Devil Made Me Do It (2021), and The Conjuring: Last Rites (2025), as well as in the DC Extended Universe films Aquaman (2018) and Shazam! (2019), respectively directed by Wan and Annabelle: Creation director David F. Sandberg. The doll also appears in Shazam! Fury of the Gods, also directed by Sandberg.

In 2019, the Occult museum closed due to zoning violations. In 2025, the Warrens' estate promoted online reports that the doll had "disappeared" as part of a viral marketing campaign for a tour called 'Devils on the Run,' showcasing items from the Warrens Occult Museum. "The doll was never missing," said Tony Spera the Director of New England Society for Psychic Research. "We had taken the doll on a brief tour to several locations, so paranormal enthusiasts could witness the real Annabelle." In July 2025, "Devils on the Run" tour organizer and host, Dan Rivera, died unexpectedly in Gettysburg, Pennsylvania. Rivera had been a lead promoter of the tour and produced videos of the doll on TikTok.

In August 2025, it was confirmed that comedian Matt Rife had purchased the Warrens' home and Occult Museum in Monroe, Connecticut. The purchase included becoming the legal guardian of the entire haunted collection, including the Annabelle doll, for at least the next five years.

== Reception ==
Skeptical investigators and scientific writers have deemed the story of the Annabelle doll as a modern legend, and have noted the lack of corroborating evidence to support paranormal claims.

Texas State University assistant professor of religious studies Joseph Laycock says most skeptics have dismissed the Warrens' museum as "full of off-the-shelf Halloween junk, dolls and toys, books you could buy at any bookstore". Laycock calls the Annabelle legend an "interesting case study in the relationship between pop culture and paranormal folklore" and speculates that the demonic doll trope popularized by films such as Child's Play, Dolly Dearest, and The Conjuring likely emerged from early legends surrounding Robert the Doll, as well as from a Twilight Zone episode released five years prior to the Warrens' story, entitled "Living Doll", in which the character of the mother is named Annabelle. Laycock suggests that "the idea of demonically possessed dolls allows modern demonologists to find supernatural evil in the most banal and domestic of places".

Commenting on publicity for the Warrens' occult museum coinciding with the film release of The Conjuring, science writer Sharon A. Hill said that many of the myths and legends surrounding the Warrens have "seemingly been of their own doing" and that many people may have difficulty "separating the Warrens from their Hollywood portrayal". Hill criticized sensational press coverage of the Warrens' occult museum and its Annabelle doll. She said, "Like real-life Ed Warren, real-life Annabelle is actually far less impressive". Of the supernatural claims made about Annabelle by Ed Warren, Hill said, "We have nothing but Ed's word for this, and also for the history and origins of the objects in the museum".
