= The Conjuring Universe =

American horror media franchise

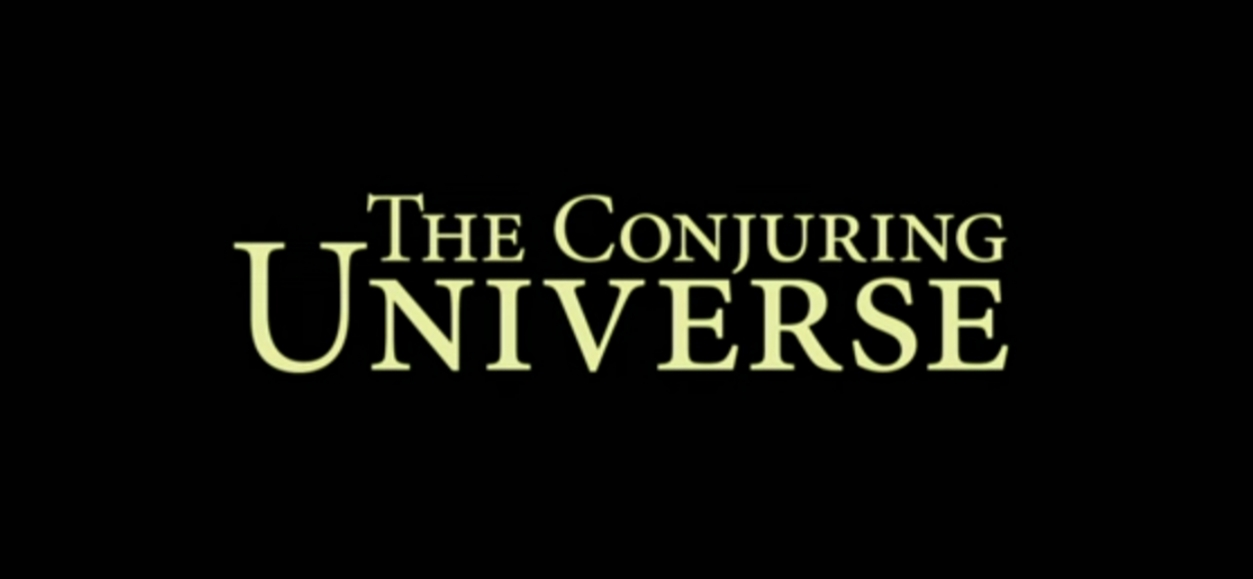
- Official franchise logo
- Created by: James Wan
- Original work: The Conjuring
- Owner: Warner Bros. Entertainment
- Years: 2013–present
- Based on: Characters by Chad & Carey W. Hayes (de jure credited)

Films and television
- Film: 9

The Conjuring Universe is an American horror franchise and shared universe centered on a series of supernatural horror films. The franchise is produced by New Line Cinema, Atomic Monster, and the Safran Company, and distributed by Warner Bros. Pictures. The films present a dramatization of the supposedly real-life adventures of Ed and Lorraine Warren, paranormal investigators and authors associated with prominent yet controversial cases of alleged hauntings. The main series follows their attempts to help people harassed by spirits, while the spin-off films focus on the origins of some of the entities the Warrens have encountered.

The franchise has been commercially successful, grossing $2.7 billion against a combined budget of $263 million and becoming the highest-grossing horror franchise to date. The franchise has received mixed reviews.

== Overview ==
The franchise consists of four films in the main series: The Conjuring (2013), The Conjuring 2 (2016), The Conjuring: The Devil Made Me Do It (2021), and The Conjuring: Last Rites (2025). The first two were directed by James Wan and the next two by Michael Chaves. The first two installments revolve around two of the Warrens' many famous paranormal cases, with the first film depicting the case of the Perron family, who experienced disturbing events in their newly acquired house in Rhode Island. The second film focuses on the controversial case of the Enfield poltergeist while briefly referring to the events that inspired The Amityville Horror. The third entry in the main series, The Conjuring: The Devil Made Me Do It, was released in 2021 and revolves around the murder trial of Arne Cheyenne Johnson in 1981 in Connecticut.

The franchise also includes Annabelle (2014), a prequel directed by The Conjuring cinematographer John R. Leonetti and produced by Wan and Peter Safran, which reveals the history of the Annabelle doll before the Warrens came into contact with it at the start of the first film. A further prequel, Annabelle: Creation (2017), directed by David F. Sandberg, shows the origins of the demon-manipulated doll. A third Annabelle film, Annabelle Comes Home, was released in 2019, with franchise writer Gary Dauberman making his directorial debut from a script he wrote. Wan has likened the story to Night at the Museum, with Annabelle activating the haunted objects in the Warrens' artifact room.

The Nun, a spiritual prequel based on a character introduced in The Conjuring 2, was released in 2018. The plot focuses on the origins of the demonic nun Valak before coming in contact with the Warrens. A sequel, The Nun II, was released in 2023, with Michael Chaves directing and Ian Goldberg, Richard Naing, and Akela Cooper serving as writers for the film.

Wan has said they sought accuracy to real life in making the main films, while the spin-offs allowed them to "just explore different sub-genres in the horror genre".

The first two Conjuring films were met with generally positive reviews by both critics and horror fans, with praise for Wan's directing and the main cast's performances, particularly Patrick Wilson and Vera Farmiga's on-screen chemistry as Ed and Lorraine. Critics also acknowledged the effect the films have had on popular culture as well as in the production of modern horror films. The third entry received mixed reviews from critics, who praised the performances of Wilson and Farmiga but considered it weaker than the previous Conjuring installments. The first entry in the Annabelle film series received negative reviews, considered inferior to its precursor. Annabelle: Creation was met with generally positive reviews. Annabelle Comes Home and The Nun II received mixed reviews. The Nun, on the other hand, received generally negative reviews. The three main films and their five spin-offs were successful at the box office, with combined earnings of over $2.1 billion worldwide against a combined budget of $208 million, making The Conjuring Universe the highest-grossing horror franchise in history and one of the most critically acclaimed.

== Development ==
Development began over 20 years before the first film's debut, when Ed Warren played a tape of Lorraine Warren's original interview with Carolyn Perron for producer Tony DeRosa-Grund. DeRosa-Grund made a recording of Warren playing back the tape and of their subsequent discussion. At the end of the tape, Warren said to DeRosa-Grund: "If we can't make this into a film I don't know what we can". DeRosa-Grund then described his vision of the film for Ed.

DeRosa-Grund wrote the original treatment and titled the project The Conjuring. For nearly 14 years, he tried to get the film made without any success. He originally landed a deal to make the film at Gold Circle Films, the production company behind The Haunting in Connecticut, but a contract could not be finalized and the deal was dropped.

DeRosa-Grund allied with producer Peter Safran, and sibling writers Chad and Carey W. Hayes were brought on board to refine the script. Using DeRosa-Grund's treatment and the Ed Warren tape, the Hayes brothers changed the story's point of view from the Perron family to that of the Warrens. The brothers interviewed Lorraine many times over the phone to clarify details. By mid-2009, the property became the subject of a six-studio bidding war that landed the film at Summit Entertainment; however, DeRosa-Grund and Summit could not conclude the transaction and the film went into turnaround. DeRosa-Grund reconnected with New Line Cinema, who had lost in the original bidding war, and the studio ultimately picked up the film. The same year on November 11, a deal was made between New Line and DeRosa-Grund's Evergreen Media Group.

== Films ==
=== Released ===
Film	U.S. release date	Director	Screenwriter(s)	Story by	Producers
Main series
The Conjuring	July 19, 2013	James Wan	Chad Hayes & Carey W. Hayes	Chad Hayes & Carey W. Hayes	Tony DeRosa-Grund, Peter Safran and Rob Cowan
The Conjuring 2	June 10, 2016	James Wan	Chad Hayes, Carey W. Hayes & James Wan and David Leslie Johnson	Chad Hayes, Carey W. Hayes & James Wan	Peter Safran, Rob Cowan and James Wan
The Conjuring: The Devil Made Me Do It	June 4, 2021	Michael Chaves	David Leslie Johnson-McGoldrick	James Wan & David Leslie Johnson-McGoldrick	Peter Safran and James Wan
The Conjuring: Last Rites	September 5, 2025	Michael Chaves	Ian Goldberg & Richard Naing and David Leslie Johnson-McGoldrick	James Wan & David Leslie Johnson-McGoldrick	Peter Safran and James Wan
Spin-off films
Annabelle	October 3, 2014	John R. Leonetti	Gary Dauberman	Gary Dauberman	Peter Safran and James Wan
Annabelle: Creation	August 11, 2017	David F. Sandberg	Gary Dauberman	Gary Dauberman	Peter Safran and James Wan
The Nun	September 7, 2018	Corin Hardy	Gary Dauberman	James Wan & Gary Dauberman	Peter Safran and James Wan
Annabelle Comes Home	June 26, 2019	Gary Dauberman	Gary Dauberman	James Wan & Gary Dauberman	Peter Safran and James Wan
The Nun II	September 8, 2023	Michael Chaves	Ian Goldberg & Richard Naing and Akela Cooper	Akela Cooper	Peter Safran and James Wan

The Conjuring Universe timeline All nine films of The Conjuring Universe take place between 1952 and 1986.
1952	The Nun
1953–1955
1956	The Nun II
1957
1958	Annabelle: Creation
1959–1969
1970	Annabelle
1971	The Conjuring
1972	Annabelle Comes Home
1973–1976
1977	The Conjuring 2
1978–1980
1981	The Conjuring: The Devil Made Me Do It
1982–1985
1986	The Conjuring: Last Rites

==== The Conjuring (2013) ====
The first installment of the series centers on the real-life exploits of Ed and Lorraine Warren, a married couple who investigated paranormal events. Patrick Wilson starred alongside Vera Farmiga as Ed and Lorraine. The film focuses on a 1971 case in which the Warrens investigated a witch's curse at a farmhouse in Harrisville, Rhode Island. The Conjuring was released on July 19, 2013, to positive reviews. It earned $320 million worldwide against a budget of $20 million, becoming one of the most profitable horror films in history.

==== Annabelle (2014) ====
A spin-off film, focusing on the origins of the Annabelle doll introduced in The Conjuring, was announced shortly after the release of its forerunner, mainly due to the film's worldwide box-office success and the character's positive reception. The plot focuses on John and Mia Form, a married couple expecting a child, whose vintage doll, Annabelle, becomes possessed by a vengeful spirit after two devil worshippers break into their home and are killed. The film was directed by The Conjuring cinematographer John R. Leonetti and produced by Safran and Wan, with Gary Dauberman behind the script. It was released worldwide on October 3, 2014, to major commercial success, becoming the 14th most profitable horror film in North America. Many critics found Annabelle inferior to The Conjuring.

==== The Conjuring 2 (2016) ====
A sequel, The Conjuring 2, was commissioned after the success of the original film and was also directed by Wan, with both Farmiga and Wilson reprising their roles. The film focused on the Enfield poltergeist case in London in 1977, while briefly referring to the events that inspired The Amityville Horror. It was released on June 10, 2016, to positive reviews from both critics and audiences; some agreed that the film was vastly superior to other horror sequels, while others debated whether the film had surpassed its predecessor in quality. Proving to be similarly successful to the first entry in the series, the film became another profitable addition to the franchise, having earned $320.3 million worldwide from a budget of $40 million, and becoming the second highest-grossing horror film of all time, after The Exorcist, until It was released in 2017.

==== Annabelle: Creation (2017) ====
An Annabelle sequel was in development, eventually revealed to be a prequel to the original film. The plot of the film centers on a dollmaker and his wife, whose daughter tragically died twelve years earlier, as they decide to open their home to a nun and several girls from a shuttered orphanage; the dollmaker's possessed creation Annabelle sets her sights on the children and turns their shelter into a storm of ultimate evil. Lights Out director David F. Sandberg replaced Leonetti as director, with Dauberman returning to write the script and Safran and Wan returning to produce. The film was released worldwide on August 11, 2017, to critical and commercial success, with many critics stating Annabelle: Creation was a vast improvement over its predecessor.

==== The Nun (2018) ====
A spin-off film titled The Nun, featuring the "Demon Nun" character Valak from The Conjuring 2, was directed by Corin Hardy, with The Conjuring 2 co-scribe David Leslie Johnson initially announced as the writer before being replaced by Gary Dauberman and Wan, who also produced with Safran. Demián Bichir and Taissa Farmiga starred in the lead roles, while Bonnie Aarons reprised her role as Valak in the film. The plot of the film follows a priest and a novitiate as they investigate an unholy secret and confront a malevolent force in the form of a demonic nun (Valak). The film was released on September 7, 2018, and grossed $365.6 million on a budget of $22 million, becoming the highest-grossing film in the franchise.

==== Annabelle Comes Home (2019) ====
The third installment in the Annabelle series, Annabelle Comes Home, featured Gary Dauberman as a writer and the director in his directorial debut. It was based on a story treatment written by Dauberman and Wan. Wan and Peter Safran co-produced the project.

Annabelle Comes Home takes place after Annabelle and The Conjuring and focuses on the doll after she was kept in the glass box in the Warrens' museum. Wilson and Farmiga reprised their roles as Ed and Lorraine Warren, alongside Mckenna Grace as Judy Warren and Madison Iseman as Judy's teenage babysitter. The film was released on June 26, 2019.

==== The Conjuring: The Devil Made Me Do It (2021) ====
After The Conjuring 2 was released, Wan revealed he would not return to direct another installment in the series, due to scheduling conflicts, but expressed interest in seeing other filmmakers direct more "Conjuring" films. Wan said that the next film in the series would take place during the 1980s and spoke of ideas for the films to explore lycanthropy, citing An American Werewolf in London and The Hound of the Baskervilles as inspiration. Safran stated that the next film would not be a haunted house movie. David Leslie Johnson-McGoldrick was hired to write the screenplay.

The Conjuring: The Devil Made Me Do It was directed by Michael Chaves, after previously directing The Curse of La Llorona, with James Wan in the producer role. Wilson and Farmiga reprised their roles as Ed and Lorraine Warren, with the plot revolving around the real-life "Devil Made Me Do It" case, a legal trial where the defendant claimed to have been possessed during the crimes of which he is accused. The film was initially scheduled for a September 11, 2020, release, before being pushed to June 4, 2021, due to the COVID-19 pandemic. The film was, however, released by Warner Bros. Pictures and New Line Cinema in the United Kingdom on May 26, 2021, followed by the United States on June 4, where it also had a month-long simultaneous release on the HBO Max streaming service.

==== The Nun II (2023) ====
Prior to the release of The Nun, Wan discussed the possibility of a sequel and what its storyline may be: "I do know where potentially, if The Nun works out, where The Nun 2 could lead to and how that ties to Lorraine's story that we've set up with the first two Conjurings and make it all come full circle".

In April 2019, Safran said that a sequel was in development, stating that there was a "really fun" storyline planned for the film. Later that month, Akela Cooper signed onto the project as writer for the film while Safran and Wan were set as producers. Bonnie Aarons expressed interest in reprising her role as the titular demon in the sequel. In February 2022, Taissa Farmiga stated that she has had discussions with Warner Bros. Pictures regarding reprising her role from the first film while stating that the restrictions on the film industry as a result of COVID-19 had delayed the project. Warner Bros. officially announced the film in April as part of its upcoming slate at the 2022 CinemaCon. Michael Chaves was confirmed as director. Initial photography began on April 29, 2022, with Bonnie Aarons reprising her role as Valak. In September 2022, it was revealed that Ian Goldberg and Richard Naing had contributed to the script as co-authors of the most recent draft. Storm Reid had joined the cast in a lead role for the film, principal photography began on October 6, 2022, and concluded later that year. Taissa Farmiga and Jonas Bloquet are reprising their roles as Sister Irene and Maurice "Frenchie" Theriault, with Anna Popplewell and Katelyn Rose Downey joining the cast.

The Nun II was released on September 8, 2023.

==== The Conjuring: Last Rites (2025) ====
In October 2022, a sequel to The Conjuring: The Devil Made Me Do It was revealed to be in development. David Leslie Johnson-McGoldrick would write the script while James Wan and Peter Safran would return as producers. Wan later confirmed that Wilson and Farmiga would reprise their respective roles. In April 2023, during CinemaCon, the film's title was revealed. In September 2023, Michael Chaves stated that work on the script was continuing, stating that the project was intended to be seen as a "finale" of the stories in the franchise that had come before. Filming had started by September 17, 2024. The film was initially believed to be the final installment with a plot centered around the Warrens, before it was later clarified to be the last installment of the first phase of films in the franchise.

The Conjuring: Last Rites was released on September 5, 2025.

=== Future ===
Film	U.S. release date	Director	Screenwriter(s)	Story by	Producers
The Conjuring: First Communion	September 10, 2027	Rodrigue Huart	Richard Naing & Ian Goldberg	Richard Naing & Ian Goldberg	Peter Safran

==== The Conjuring: First Communion (2027) ====
In August 2025, Madison Lawlor and Orion Smith expressed interest in portraying Ed and Lorraine in prequel movies, including one potentially exploring the couple's involvement with the Amityville haunting. In September 2025, a Conjuring prequel film was announced as in development following the financial success of Last Rites. Rodrigue Huart was in early negotiations to serve as director, with a script co-written by Richard Naing and Ian Goldberg. The plot will follow investigations during Ed and Lorraine Warren's early years, with younger actors expected to star in the movie. In January 2026, the film was titled The Conjuring: First Communion and was given a release date of September 10, 2027. Later that summer, Garrett Wareing and Amanda Fix were reported to have been cast as Ed and Lorraine Warren, with Charles Parnell also joining the cast in an unspecified role. Filming began in August under the working title Bridgeport in Schenectady, New York.

==== Other potential projects ====
In June 2017, producer Peter Safran stated that while the studio would not incorporate characters from other standalone original works, there are various projects in development. He later reiterated that future projects would only be made that have a direct connection to the Warrens and the other released films in the franchise; stating that they would continue to be made "as long as [we] keep having original stories to tell". By May 2021, he said that there were multiple future projects in various stages of development, with Patrick Wilson and Vera Farmiga intended to reprise their roles. Safran stated: "[They] are such unique actors and they portray Ed and Lorraine so beautifully that we'd love to keep making these movies with them. Ed and Lorraine investigated cases for 50 years, so we have another 40 years with Patrick and Vera before we run out".

Following the release of Annabelle Comes Home in June 2019, Gary Dauberman acknowledged the possibility of a fourth Annabelle film, while stating that there's potential for a number of spin-off films centered around the other cursed artifacts and their entities, as well. The filmmaker revealed that specific entities received detailed backstories that he wrote during the production for Annabelle Comes Home. Developed with Wan, he stated that the future of the franchise would explore different sub-genres of horror; stating that a psychological horror film centered around The Bride, and a slasher horror film centered around The Samurai, were examples of options that were discussed for development.

In June 2021, after the release of The Conjuring: The Devil Made Me Do It, Michael Chaves revealed that the film was originally intended to directly tie into the next spin-off film. Centered around a demonic character that was cut from the third Conjuring referred to as the Lost Demon, Chaves stated that this entity would be notable because it was entirely based on descriptions from true account witnesses. Though the full character reveal was removed from the final cut, as well as a subplot where Isla the occultist was working with the demon, the filmmaker noted that it is the same entity that torments David in the waterbed and ultimately enters his body. He expressed hope that one day the project would be green-lit. Chaves commented that James Wan has several Warren "cases up his sleeve", with "a lot of things ... to explore". The filmmaker acknowledged that he knew various projects that were being developed.

In August 2023, Chaves said there is potential for additional projects featuring the Nun, to explore the timeframe between the 1950s and the 1960s. In September of the same year, he stated that as a fan of the series, he would like to see a project where various demonic entities from each of the installments antagonize the Warrens. In April 2025, the president and CCO of New Line Cinema announced at CinemaCon that the studio was actively developing a second phase of films, which are intended to the follow the release of The Conjuring: Last Rites. By August, Wan stated that future movies may include Judy Warren's real-life experiences as a paranormal investigator. Wilson and Farmiga expressed interest in reprising their respective roles, with Wilson saying about their characters: "We're in our 50s, and Lorraine lived into her 90s while Ed was in his 70s, so we're still around." Mia Tomlinson confirmed her interest in reprising her role as Judy in future installments.

- The Crooked Man: In May 2017, Safran said that the Crooked Man character from The Conjuring 2 was being considered by the studio for a feature film. By June of the same year, a spin-off film titled The Crooked Man was officially in development with Mike Van Waes serving as screenwriter, based on an original story by Wan; Wan and Safran were set to produce the project. Though in its early stages of development, the filmmaker stated that the sub-genre of horror would be a "dark fairytale". By September 2018, Safran stated that work on the script was ongoing, and that the studio wants to wait until they have a draft that they like before further production will commence. The producer reiterated what Wan had stated, reaffirming that the intention is for each installment in the franchise to have its own style. He later stated that while The Crooked Man was intended to be the next movie following The Conjuring 2, the project had been delayed in favor of fast-tracking production on The Nun due to the audience response to the character. In November 2022, Wan announced that, outside of his control, the project was not moving forward at that time while expressing hope for a potential future release. Wan confirmed in May 2025 that he still hoped to one day create a Crooked Man film.

=== Related films ===
Film	U.S. release date	Director	Screenwriter(s)	Producer(s)
Wolves at the Door	April 18, 2017	John R. Leonetti	Gary Dauberman	Peter Safran
The Curse of La Llorona	April 19, 2019	Michael Chaves	Mikki Daughtry & Tobias Iaconis	James Wan, Gary Dauberman and Emile Gladstone
The Revenge of La Llorona	February 26, 2027	Santiago Menghini	Sean Tretta	James Wan, Gary Dauberman and Emile Gladstone

==== Wolves at the Door (2016) ====
In May 2015, John R. Leonetti was announced as the director of Wolves at the Door for New Line Cinema, with Gary Dauberman as screenwriter and Peter Safran as producer. Although the film is not an installment in The Conjuring Universe, it stars Eric Ladin, who reprises his role as Detective Clarkin from Leonetti's 2014 film Annabelle. Wolves at the Door is loosely based on the Manson Family murders in 1969.

==== The Curse of La Llorona (2019) ====
In October 2017, Wan served as a producer of a horror film directed by Michael Chaves and starring Linda Cardellini, which was then titled The Children. The film was later retitled The Curse of La Llorona (also known as The Curse of the Weeping Woman in some international markets). Although the film is not an official installment in The Conjuring Universe, it stars Tony Amendola, who reprises his role from Annabelle as Father Perez. The character gives direction to the family being tormented by the titular spirit and relates the haunting to his experiences with the demonic entity attached to the doll, with Annabelle appearing on screen.

==== The Revenge of La Llorona (2027) ====
In October 2025, a sequel to The Curse of La Llorona was announced, with Santiago Menghini directing the film from a script by Sean Tretta. The story centers around a fractured family who must work together alongside their estranged grandfather to resolve their past and ancient evils before the Weeping Woman claims their children forever. It stars Monica Raymund, Jay Hernandez, Raymond Cruz, Edy Ganem, Martín Fajardo, Acston Luca Porto and Avie Porto in lead roles. James Wan, Gary Dauberman and Emile Gladstone returned as producers; principal photography began early the same month.

The Revenge of La Llorona is scheduled to be released in the United States on February 26, 2027.

== Television ==
In May 2021, Peter Safran said that there were ongoing developments for a television series set within The Conjuring Universe. The producer stated that while they did not want to take away from the film installments, there were "some more long-form stories that would be better told over eight episodes or eight hours as opposed to just a two-hour movie". Safran acknowledged that an expansion of the franchise into television shows has been in discussion for some time, with the launch of HBO Max providing Warner Bros. Entertainment with a distributor for any potential series.

In April 2023, an untitled television series in the franchise was announced as being in development. The show would take place chronologically after the events of the films, with James Wan and Peter Safran serving as executive producers. The project was set to be a joint-venture production between New Line Television, Warner Bros. Television Studios, Atomic Monster, the Safran Company, and Max Originals, and was being developed for release via streaming exclusively on Warner Bros. Discovery's HBO Max.

In September 2025, Nancy Won was reported to serve as a writer, executive producer, and showrunner for the series. Peter Cameron and Cameron Squires will also serve as writers.

== Recurring cast and characters ==
This table lists the main characters who appear in The Conjuring Universe, in alphabetical order by the character's last name.

List indicators

This section includes characters who will appear or have appeared in more than two films in the series.

- An empty grey cell indicates the character was not in the film, or that the character's official presence has not yet been confirmed.
- ^{A} indicates an appearance through archival footage or audio.
- ^{C} indicates a cameo role.
- ^{O} indicates an older version of the character.
- ^{U} indicates an uncredited appearance.
- ^{V} indicates a voice-only role.
- ^{Y} indicates a younger version of the character.

Characters	Films									
Characters	The Conjuring films					Annabelle films			The Nun films	
Characters	The Conjuring	The Conjuring 2	The Conjuring: The Devil Made Me Do It	The Conjuring: Last Rites	The Conjuring: First Communion	Annabelle	Annabelle: Creation	Annabelle Comes Home	The Nun	The Nun II
Characters	2013	2016	2021	2025	2027	2014	2017	2019	2018	2023
Ed Warren	Patrick Wilson	Patrick Wilson	Patrick Wilson Mitchell Hoog^{Y}	Patrick Wilson Orion Smith^{Y}	Garrett Wareing	Patrick Wilson^{V}^{U}		Patrick Wilson	Patrick Wilson^{A}	Patrick Wilson^{C}
Lorraine Warren	Vera Farmiga	Vera Farmiga	Vera Farmiga Megan Ashley Brown^{Y}	Vera Farmiga Madison Lawlor^{Y}	Amanda Fix			Vera Farmiga	Vera Farmiga^{A}	Vera Farmiga^{C}
Judy Warren	Sterling Jerins	Sterling Jerins	Sterling Jerins	Mia Tomlinson Emmy Nolan^{Y}				Mckenna Grace	Sterling Jerins^{A}	
Annabelle	Appeared	Appeared	Appeared	Appeared	Appeared	Appeared	Appeared	Appeared		
Malthus The Ram Demon	Joseph Bishara					Joseph Bishara	Joseph Bishara Fred Tatasciore^{V}	Alexander Ward		
Camilla	Amy Tipton					Amy Tipton		Sade Katarina		
Debbie	Morganna Bridgers					Morganna Bridgers		Kenzie Caplan		
Rick	Zach Pappas					Zach Pappas		Zach Pappas		
Father Gordon	Steve Coulter	Steve Coulter	Steve Coulter	Steve Coulter	Steve Coulter			Steve Coulter		
Brad Hamilton	John Brotherton				John Brotherton					
Carolyn Perron	Lili Taylor				Lili Taylor^{C}				Lili Taylor^{A}	
Cindy Perron	Mackenzie Foy				Mackenzie Foy^{C}					
Maurice "Frenchie" Theriault	Christof Veillon								Jonas Bloquet	Jonas Bloquet
Drew Thomas	Shannon Kook	Shannon Kook	Shannon Kook	Shannon Kook	Shannon Kook					
Janet Hodgson		Madison Wolfe		Madison Wolfe^{C}						
Peggy Hodgson		Frances O'Connor		Frances O'Connor^{C}						
Valak The Nun		Bonnie Aarons Robin Atkin Downes^{V}					Bonnie Aarons^{U}^{C}		Bonnie Aarons Dee Bradley Baker^{V} Debra Wilson^{V}	Bonnie Aarons Andrew Morgado^{V}
David Glatzel				Julian Hilliard	Julian Hilliard^{C}					
Janice "Annabelle" Higgins						Tree O'Toole Keira Daniels^{Y}	Talitha Bateman Tree O'Toole^{O}	Tree O'Toole^{C}^{U}		
Pete Higgins						Brian Howe	Brian Howe			
Sharon Higgins						Kerry O'Malley	Kerry O'Malley			
Thin Man						Trampas Thompson	Trampas Thompson			
Annabelle "Bee" Mullins							Samara Lee	Samara Lee		
Sister Irene Palmer									Taissa Farmiga	Taissa Farmiga Margot Bernazzi^{Y}
Cardinal Conroy									David Horovitch	David Horovitch

== Additional crew and production details ==
Film	Crew/detail					
Film	Composer	Cinematographer	Editor(s)	Production companies	Distributing company	Running time
The Conjuring	Joseph Bishara	John R. Leonetti	Kirk Morri	New Line Cinema; The Safran Company; Evergreen Media Group	Warner Bros. Pictures	112 min
Annabelle	Joseph Bishara	James Kniest	Tom Elkins	New Line Cinema; The Safran Company; RatPac-Dune Entertainment; Atomic Monster	Warner Bros. Pictures	99 min
The Conjuring 2	Joseph Bishara	Don Burgess	Kirk Morri	New Line Cinema; The Safran Company; RatPac-Dune Entertainment; Atomic Monster	Warner Bros. Pictures	134 min
Annabelle: Creation	Benjamin Wallfisch	Maxime Alexandre	Michel Aller	New Line Cinema; The Safran Company; RatPac-Dune Entertainment; Atomic Monster	Warner Bros. Pictures	110 min
The Nun	Abel Korzeniowski	Maxime Alexandre	Michel Aller & Ken Blackwell	New Line Cinema; The Safran Company; Atomic Monster	Warner Bros. Pictures	97 min
Annabelle Comes Home	Joseph Bishara	Michael Burgess	Kirk Morri	New Line Cinema; The Safran Company; Atomic Monster	Warner Bros. Pictures	106 min
The Conjuring: The Devil Made Me Do It	Joseph Bishara	Michael Burgess	Peter Gvozdas & Christian Wagner	New Line Cinema; The Safran Company; Atomic Monster	Warner Bros. Pictures	112 min
The Nun II	Marco Beltrami	Tristan Nyby	Gregory Plotkin	New Line Cinema; The Safran Company; Atomic Monster	Warner Bros. Pictures	110 min
The Conjuring: Last Rites	Benjamin Wallfisch	Eli Born	Gregory Plotkin & Elliot Greenberg	New Line Cinema; The Safran Company; Atomic Monster	Warner Bros. Pictures	135 min

== Reception ==
=== Box office performance ===
The franchise has been notable for its profit, with The Conjuring and its follow-up having earned a combined profit of $260 million, according to Deadline, while Annabelle managed to make 40 times its $6.5 million budget. Scott Mendelson of Forbes called the franchise the "first successful post–Marvel cinematic universe". The Hollywood Reporter in 2022 wrote that "Besides the Marvel Cinematic Universe, an argument can be made that the Conjuring franchise is the second-most successful cinematic universe at the moment".

Film	U.S. release date	Box office gross			Box office ranking		Budget	Ref.
Film	U.S. release date	North America	Other territories	Worldwide	All time North America	All time worldwide	Budget	Ref.
The Conjuring	July 19, 2013	$137,446,368	$182,966,917	$320,422,209	#515	#547	$20 million	
Annabelle	October 3, 2014	$84,284,252	$173,305,469	$257,589,721	#1,037	#707	$6.5 million	
The Conjuring 2	June 10, 2016	$102,516,140	$220,303,614	$322,819,915	#807	#537	$40 million	
Annabelle: Creation	August 11, 2017	$102,092,201	$204,500,000	$306,592,201	#813	#575	$15 million	
The Nun	September 7, 2018	$117,481,222	$248,601,575	$366,082,797	#660	#439	$22 million	
Annabelle Comes Home	June 26, 2019	$74,152,591	$157,100,000	$231,252,591	#1,219	#802	$27 million	
The Conjuring: The Devil Made Me Do It	June 4, 2021	$65,631,050	$140,813,073	$206,444,123	#1,410	#935	$39 million	
The Nun II	September 8, 2023	$86,270,590	$183,400,000	$269,670,590	#1,004	#665	$38.5 million	
The Conjuring: Last Rites	September 5, 2025	$177,756,445	$321,500,000	$499,256,445	#346	#293	$55 million	
Total		$947,630,859	$1,832,490,648	$2,780,130,592			$263 million	

=== Critical and public response ===
Film	Critical		Public
Film	Rotten Tomatoes	Metacritic	CinemaScore
The Conjuring	86% (227 reviews)	68 (35 reviews)	A−
Annabelle	28% (135 reviews)	37 (27 reviews)	B
The Conjuring 2	80% (253 reviews)	65 (38 reviews)	A−
Annabelle: Creation	71% (190 reviews)	62 (29 reviews)	B
The Nun	24% (206 reviews)	46 (32 reviews)	C
Annabelle Comes Home	64% (209 reviews)	53 (35 reviews)	B−
The Conjuring: The Devil Made Me Do It	56% (253 reviews)	53 (40 reviews)	B+
The Nun II	51% (136 reviews)	47 (24 reviews)	C+
The Conjuring: Last Rites	57% (190 reviews)	54 (29 reviews)	B

== Comic books ==
In April 2021, DC Comics formed a new horror imprint called DC Horror. The first of a series of comics set within The Conjuring Universe was released on June 1 the same year. The Conjuring: The Lover is a 5-issue limited series that serves as a prequel to The Conjuring: The Devil Made Me Do It. The story involves a college student named Jessica. She struggles with college life and her discovery that something sinister is targeting her. Each issue includes backup stories, which explore the cursed artifacts in the Warren's basement museum. The limited series is co-written by David Leslie Johnson-McGoldrick and Rex Ogle, with artwork by Garry Brown and cover art by Bill Sienkiewicz. The backup stories featuring the occult items from the Warrens' artifact room were written by various writers: the first by Scott Snyder, with Denys Cowan serving as artist, the second from writer Che Grayson and artist Juan Ferreyra, the third from writer Tim Seeley and artist Kelley Jones, followed by the fourth from writer Ray Fawkes and artist Christopher Mitten, and by the fifth from writer and artist Dominike "Domo" Stanton. In March 2022, a trade hardcover collecting the issues was released.

The Conjuring: The Lover
Issue	Publication date	Title	Writer(s)	Artist(s)
#1	June 1, 2021	"The Conjuring: The Lover #1"	David Leslie Johnson-McGoldrick & Rex Ogle	Garry Brown
#1	June 1, 2021	"Tales from the Artifact Room: The Ferryman"	Scott Snyder	Denys Cowan
#2	July 6, 2021	"The Conjuring: The Lover #2"	David Leslie Johnson-McGoldrick & Rex Ogle	Garry Brown
#2	July 6, 2021	"Tales from the Artifact Room: The Bloody Bride"	Che Grayson	Juan Ferreyra
#3	August 3, 2021	"The Conjuring: The Lover #3"	David Leslie Johnson-McGoldrick & Rex Ogle	Garry Brown
#3	August 3, 2021	"Tales from the Artifact Room: The Accordion Monkey"	Tim Seeley	Kelley Jones
#4	September 7, 2021	"The Conjuring: The Lover #4"	David Leslie Johnson-McGoldrick & Rex Ogle	Garry Brown
#4	September 7, 2021	"Tales from the Artifact Room: The Sleeping Song"	Ray Fawkes	Christopher Mitten
#5	October 5, 2021	"The Conjuring: The Lover #5"	David Leslie Johnson-McGoldrick & Rex Ogle	Garry Brown
#5	October 5, 2021	"Tales from the Artifact Room: The Chalice"	Dominike "Domo" Stanton	Dominike "Domo" Stanton

== Tie-in media ==
=== The 3:07 AM Project ===
In July 2013, prior to the theatrical release of The Conjuring, Vice Media, alongside Warner Bros. Entertainment and New Line Cinema (under the banner of The Conjuring), presented a series of anthology horror short films titled The 3:07 A.M. Project. In the series of shorts, the witching hour of 3:07 a.m. is the only recurring theme within each short. The shorts were presented as a marketing device that drew attention to the first installment of The Conjuring Universe leading up to its release date. The short films were met with mixed reception, while each filmmaker would later find success in other noteworthy horror franchises. While the series does not connect directly to the franchise, it serves as the first attempt at expanding the franchise, though this specific time was referenced in the first movie of the franchise.

The 3:07 A.M. Project
Film	U.S. release date	Director	Screenwriter	Producer
This One, For The Lady	July 17, 2013	Nacho Vigalondo	Nacho Vigalondo	Rob Cotterill
The Séance	July 17, 2013	Max Landis	Max Landis	Rob Cotterill
Box	July 17, 2013	Ti West	Ti West	Rob Cotterill
One Last Dive	July 17, 2013	Jason Eisener	Jason Eisener	Rob Cotterill

=== The Conjuring: Unspoken ===
In October 2026, Netflix announced The Conjuring: Unspoken, a video game developed by Supermassive Games as part of Netflix Games. It follows Francesca Noakes (played by Emma McDonald), a demonologist who investigates the haunting of a English pub called The Red Lionn. The game was released on October 13, 2026.

== Home media ==
Film	Format	U.S. release date	Distributor	Notes
The Conjuring	DVD, Blu-ray, 4K Blu-ray	October 22, 2013	Warner Bros. Home Entertainment	
Annabelle	DVD, Blu-ray	January 20, 2015	Warner Bros. Home Entertainment	
The Conjuring 2	DVD, Blu-ray	September 13, 2016	Warner Bros. Home Entertainment	
Annabelle: Creation	DVD, Blu-ray	October 24, 2017	Warner Bros. Home Entertainment	
The Nun	DVD, Blu-ray, 4K Blu-ray	December 4, 2018	Warner Bros. Home Entertainment	
Annabelle Comes Home	DVD, Blu-ray	October 8, 2019	Warner Bros. Home Entertainment	
The Conjuring: The Devil Made Me Do It	DVD, Blu-ray, 4K Blu-ray	August 24, 2021	Warner Bros. Home Entertainment	
The Nun II	DVD, Blu-ray, 4K Blu-ray	November 14, 2023	Warner Bros. Home Entertainment	
The Conjuring: Last Rites	DVD, Blu-ray, 4K Blu-ray	November 25, 2025	Warner Bros. Home Entertainment	

== Lawsuits ==
Norma Sutcliffe and Gerald Helfrich, previous owners of the house on which The Conjuring was based, have sued Wan, Warner Bros. and other producers in 2015 because their property was being constantly vandalized as a consequence of the film. Entertainment Weekly obtained documents in which the owners affirm various invasions and ratify that they have found numerous objects affiliated with satanic cults. The lawsuit also reveals that the previous owners bought the house in 1987 and lived "in peace" until 2013. Both owners had been seeking unspecified damages. When questioned, a spokesperson for Warner Bros. declined to comment on the issue.

Gerald Brittle, author of a book about the Warrens called The Demonologist, filed a $900 million lawsuit on March 29, 2017, against Warner Bros., New Line Cinema, Wan and others, claiming that he had the exclusive rights to the Warrens' story and that it had been stolen by the studios and producers. The case was scheduled to go to trial on April 16, 2018, with a Warner Bros. spokesperson commenting: "We're pleased the Court significantly narrowed the case and look forward to addressing the remaining claims at summary judgment. Mr. Brittle's claims are not only without merit, but contradict Mr. Brittle's prior admissions in other failed lawsuits concerning The Conjuring movies".

On December 13, 2017, Warner Bros. settled the lawsuit, revealing that Tony DeRosa-Grund, the producer of the original film, was the "mastermind" behind the lawsuit, without Brittle ever having been involved. Brittle himself commented that "Mr. DeRosa-Grund has been controlling this litigation from the start. [...] Based on a review of text messages between Mr. DeRosa-Grund and my attorney, I understand that he even threatened my attorneys that if they sent information from me without him seeing it first they would be fired". This followed repeated failed lawsuits by DeRosa-Grund against Warner Bros., claiming they owed him millions of dollars from the franchise; he eventually settled with Warner Bros., agreeing to never sue them again for anything related to the franchise.
