= The Nun (2018 film) =

Horror film by Corin Hardy

- Theatrical release poster
- Directed by: Corin Hardy
- Screenplay by: Gary Dauberman
- Story by: James Wan; Gary Dauberman
- Produced by: Peter Safran; James Wan
- Starring: Demián Bichir; Taissa Farmiga; Jonas Bloquet
- Cinematography: Maxime Alexandre
- Edited by: Michel Aller; Ken Blackwell
- Music by: Abel Korzeniowski
- Production companies: New Line Cinema; Atomic Monster; The Safran Company
- Distributed by: Warner Bros. Pictures
- Release dates: September 4, 2018 (TCL Chinese Theatre); September 7, 2018 (United States)
- Running time: 96 minutes
- Country: United States
- Language: English
- Budget: $22 million
- Box office: $366 million

The Nun is a 2018 American gothic supernatural horror film directed by Corin Hardy and written by Gary Dauberman, from a story by Dauberman and James Wan. It serves as a spiritual spin-off to The Conjuring 2 and is the fifth installment in The Conjuring Universe franchise. The film stars Taissa Farmiga, Demián Bichir and Jonas Bloquet, with Bonnie Aarons reprising her role as the Demon Nun, an incarnation of Valak, from The Conjuring 2. The plot follows a Roman Catholic priest and a nun in her novitiate as they uncover an unholy secret in 1952 Romania.

Warner Bros. Pictures and New Line Cinema announced The Nun, a spin-off film to The Conjuring 2, which had opened five days earlier, with Peter Safran and Wan producing. The film's initial script was by David Leslie Johnson. Hardy had signed on to direct The Nun with a new screenplay by Wan and Dauberman. Principal photography began in May 2017 in Bucharest, Romania.

The Nun was released in the United States on September 7, 2018. It received negative reviews and grossed $366 million worldwide off a $22 million budget, and was the highest-grossing film in the franchise until the release of The Conjuring: Last Rites (2025). A sequel, The Nun II, was released in 2023.

== Plot ==
In 1952 Romania, two Roman Catholic nuns living at the Saint Cartha's monastery are attacked by an unseen evil force. The surviving nun, Sister Victoria, flees the attacker, a demon appearing as a nun, and hangs herself to avoid being used as a vessel by the demon. Her body is discovered by Frenchie, a villager who transports supplies to the nuns.

Upon learning of the incident, The Vatican sends Father Burke with Sister Irene, a nun in her novitiate, to Romania to investigate. The pair meet Frenchie and travel to the abbey, where they examine Victoria's body and take a key from her corpse. They then meet the Abbess, who informs them that because the nuns observe silence during the night, they must return the next day. Frenchie decides to leave the convent while Father Burke and Sister Irene stay behind. As Frenchie is leaving, he is attacked by a demonic entity in the form of Sister Victoria's corpse. Later that night, Burke is rescued by Irene after being lured by hallucinations of a boy he failed to save after a botched exorcism and is buried alive in the graveyard by the demonic entity.

Irene and Burke return to the abbey the next day, but only Irene can enter, as it is cloistered. She meets the other nuns and learns that they pray constantly, swapping shifts, to keep the entity at bay. The abbey was built in the Dark Ages as a castle for the Duke of St. Carta, an influential aristocrat obsessed with the occult. The duke summoned the demon through a rift in the catacombs but was killed by Christian knights, who sealed the rift with a vial filled with the Blood of Christ and reclaimed the abbey to contain the evil. But the bombings during World War II reopened the rift, unleashing the entity. Through a book he saw and took after being buried alive, Burke identifies the demon as Valak and discovers the Abbess has been dead all along.

Valak attacks Irene, who joins the nuns in prayer to ward it off. When she reunites with Burke and Frenchie, she discovers that none of the nuns she saw and talked to were real, and she had been praying alone. Sister Victoria had been the last nun in that abbey and had sacrificed herself to stop Valak from possessing her.

Theorizing that Valak can only be stopped if they seal the rift again with the blood of Christ from the reliquary, as the knights did, the trio retrieves the vial with Victoria's key. Irene asks Burke to elevate her status to a professed nun, which he does. In the tunnel, she is possessed by Valak, but Frenchie smears the blood of Christ on her face, casting out the demon. Valak starts to drown her in a flooded chamber. Irene, who had kept some of Christ's blood from the vial in her mouth, spits it into the demon's face, banishing it as the rift is sealed. Frenchie resuscitates Irene and reveals his real name is Maurice. Unbeknownst to the others, Valak possessed Maurice during the attack.

Twenty years later, at a university seminar in Wakefield, Massachusetts, Carolyn Perron watches as Ed and Lorraine Warren present footage of their attempt to exorcise a possessed older Maurice. Maurice grabs Lorraine, showing her a vision of Ed dying, which initiates the Warrens' investigation of the Perron farmhouse haunting.

== Cast ==
- Demián Bichir as Father Burke
- Taissa Farmiga as Sister Irene
- Jonas Bloquet as Frenchie/Maurice
- Bonnie Aarons as The Nun
- Ingrid Bisu as Sister Oana
- Charlotte Hope as Sister Victoria
- Sandra Teles as Sister Ruth
- Maria Obretin as Sister Abigail
- August Maturo as Daniel
- Jack Falk as evil Daniel
- Ani Sava as Sister Jessica
- Michael Smiley as Bishop Pasquale
- Gabrielle Downey as the Abbess
- Jared Morgan as Marquis
- Manuela Ciucur as Sister Christine
- Mark Steger as the Duke

Additionally, Patrick Wilson, Vera Farmiga, and Lili Taylor appear in archive footage from The Conjuring as Ed and Lorraine Warren and Carolyn Perron, respectively.

== Production ==
=== Development ===
On June 15, 2016, Warner Bros. Pictures and New Line Cinema announced The Nun, a spin-off film to The Conjuring 2, which had opened five days earlier. Peter Safran and James Wan produced. The initial script for the film was written by David Leslie Johnson. On February 17, 2017, it was announced that Corin Hardy had signed on to direct The Nun with a new screenplay from Wan and Gary Dauberman. During the filming of Annabelle: Creation, Safran revealed that The Nun would chronologically come first in The Conjuring Universe, making it a further prequel to The Conjuring series and Annabelle series. He said, "We have a board that we created that has what we hope will ultimately be our series of movies. We have it in chronological order, so we can keep track of where it all happens."

=== Casting ===
On April 5, 2017, Demián Bichir was cast in the film, as a priest investigating a nun's mysterious suicide. Taissa Farmiga was cast shortly after, as a Roman Catholic nun in her novitiate. Corin Hardy later said that he initially did not want to cast Farmiga due to her being the sister of The Conjuring star Vera Farmiga, but changed his mind when he saw her auditions, "I watched 100 auditions for this role and she had some kind of presence outside of her own body that is evident, and she's phenomenal." Bonnie Aarons was then set to reprise her role as the "Demon Nun" character Valak from The Conjuring 2. Charlotte Hope, Jonas Bloquet, and Ingrid Bisu were subsequently announced to star, rounding out the main cast.

=== Filming ===
Principal photography for the film began on May 3, 2017, at Castel Film Studios in Bucharest, Romania, with Maxime Alexandre serving as cinematographer. Film director Corin Hardy had a Roman Catholic priest bless the set prior to filming. Scenes were filmed in the Palace of the Parliament building in June, for a fee of €5,000 per hour. Filming also took place at the Corvin Castle in Hunedoara and in Sighișoara, Transylvania. Hardy saw a handprint in the dust while filming in Mogoșoaia, which he believed to be that of a ghost. Hardy announced on his social media accounts that production had wrapped on June 23, 2017, after 38 days.

=== Post-production ===
The Nun reportedly went under extensive reshoots. The Curse of La Llorona cinematographer Michael Burgess had worked on the film. Wan also worked as a second unit director under Hardy.

== Music ==
The original musical score for The Nun was composed by Abel Korzeniowski, and was released on August 31, 2018, by WaterTower Music.

== Marketing ==
On June 13, 2018, a teaser trailer was released. In August 2018, a short advertisement for the film was removed from YouTube due to an unskippable jump scare that violated the platform's "Shocking Content" policies. The studio spent an estimated $90 million on prints and advertisements for the film.

== Release ==
In August 2018, the TV Spot came out. The film was released on September 7, 2018.

== Home media ==
The film was released on Digital HD on November 20, 2018, and on Blu-ray and DVD on December 4, 2018. On May 31, 2022, it was released alongside other The Conjuring Universe movies on Blu-ray, excluding The Curse of Llorona.

== Reception ==
=== Box office ===
The Nun grossed $117.4 million in the United States and Canada, and $248.6 million in other territories, for a total worldwide gross of $366 million, against a production budget of $22 million, becoming the highest-grossing film in the franchise until it was surpassed by The Conjuring: Last Rites in 2025. Deadline Hollywood calculated the net profit of the film to be $155 million, when factoring together all expenses and revenues.

In the United States and Canada, The Nun was released alongside Peppermint and God Bless the Broken Road, and was originally projected to gross $32–37 million in its opening weekend. By the week of its release, forecasts had been increased to $36–45 million from 3,876 theaters. It made $22.4 million on its first day, including $5.4 million from Thursday night previews, both the highest such numbers for The Conjuring films. It went on to debut to $53.8 million, also marking the best figure of the franchise, and became the first film in almost a month to finish ahead of Crazy Rich Asians at the box office.

In other territories, it currently ranks as the highest-grossing horror film of all time in twelve markets, including Indonesia, Brazil, Romania and UAE; in the Philippines, the film was the highest-grossing horror film of all time until it was surpassed by Insidious: The Red Door in 2023.

=== Critical response ===
On the review aggregator website Rotten Tomatoes, 24% of 206 critics' reviews are positive, with an average rating of 4.4/10. The website's consensus reads: "The Nun boasts strong performances, spooky atmospherics, and a couple decent set-pieces, but its sins include inconsistent logic and narrative slackness." Metacritic, which uses a weighted average, assigned the film a score of 46 out of 100, based on 32 critics, indicating "mixed or average" reviews. Audiences polled by CinemaScore gave the film an average grade of C on an A+ to F scale, the lowest of the series.

Ben Kenigsberg of The New York Times criticized a lack of consistent narrative logic. Donald Clarke of The Irish Times wrote, "To compare it to a ghost train would be to understate the narrative cohesion that habitually governs those seaside entertainments." Matthew Rozsa for Salon said, "By overly relying on jump scares, The Nun uses a mechanical approach toward instilling fear rather than a more profound understanding of terror." Writing for The A.V. Club, Katie Rife compared it to Gothic horror by Mario Bava and Hammer Films, praising the "giddiness" but criticizing the "heavy-handed" exposition and lack of suspense.

The Plugged In review for the film summarized the spirituality evident in the film: "Evil is real, the movie tells us, but so is God. Spiritual trappings are everywhere. And when in doubt or danger, you can't go wrong with a little prayer." In her review of the film published in the National Catholic Reporter, Sr. Rose Pacatte, a nun belonging to the Daughters of St. Paul, stated "that there are two Catholic theological aspects of this film that are accurate: one is that the devil exists, and the other is that Mary, the Mother of Jesus, will show us the way." Another religious sister, Nicole Reich, stated in her review of the film published on Syfy Wire that if Valak was a real demon, he would never be able to reveal himself while the "sisters were in perpetual adoration ... because the Lord was present".

== Sequel ==
In August 2017, Wan discussed the possibility of a Nun sequel and what its storyline might entail: "I do know where potentially, if The Nun works out, where The Nun 2 could lead to and how that ties back to Lorraine's story that we've set up with the first two Conjurings and make it all come full circle."

In April 2019, it was announced by Peter Safran that a sequel was in development. He stated there was a "really fun" storyline planned for the film, and commented that there was an "inevitability to another The Nun movie". Later that month, Akela Cooper signed onto the project as screenwriter, while Safran and James Wan will serve as producers.

On April 26, 2022, Warner Bros. Pictures officially announced the movie as a part of its upcoming slate at the 2022 CinemaCon. The following day, it was announced that Michael Chaves will direct the film. Principal photography began on April 29, 2022. Bonnie Aarons was confirmed to be reprising her role as Valak.

On September 8, 2023, the film was released.
