= The Nun II =

2023 film by Michael Chaves

- Theatrical release poster
- Directed by: Michael Chaves
- Screenplay by: Ian Goldberg; Richard Naing; Akela Cooper
- Story by: Akela Cooper
- Based on: Characters by James Wan; Gary Dauberman
- Produced by: James Wan; Peter Safran
- Starring: Taissa Farmiga; Jonas Bloquet; Storm Reid; Anna Popplewell
- Cinematography: Tristan Nyby
- Edited by: Gregory Plotkin
- Music by: Marco Beltrami
- Production companies: New Line Cinema; Atomic Monster; The Safran Company
- Distributed by: Warner Bros. Pictures
- Release date: September 8, 2023
- Running time: 110 minutes
- Country: United States
- Language: English
- Budget: $38.5 million
- Box office: $269.5 million

The Nun II is a 2023 American gothic supernatural horror film directed by Michael Chaves, with a screenplay written by Ian Goldberg, Richard Naing, and Akela Cooper from a story by Cooper. Serving as both a sequel to The Nun (2018) and the eighth installment in The Conjuring Universe franchise. The film stars Taissa Farmiga, Jonas Bloquet, and Bonnie Aarons, returning from the first film, with Storm Reid and Anna Popplewell joining the cast. Peter Safran and James Wan return as producers.

In 2017, Wan discussed the possibility of a Nun sequel and by 2019, Safran revealed that the film was in early development. Cooper was initially hired as the sole writer, before Goldberg and Naing contributed as screenwriters to the final script. Chaves, who had previously helmed The Conjuring: The Devil Made Me Do It (2021) and The Curse of La Llorona (2019), was announced as director. Principal photography began in October 2022 in France.

The Nun II was released in the United States by Warner Bros. Pictures on September 8, 2023. The film was a commercial success, grossing $269 million worldwide, and received mixed reviews from critics.

== Plot ==
In 1956, Father Noiret and his altar boy, Jacques, perform daily chores in their church in Tarascon, France. While investigating a disturbance, Noiret is raised into the air, set on fire, and burned to death before a terrified Jacques.

Four years after the events at Saint Cartha's monastery, Sister Irene now serves in a convent in Italy. Maurice works at a boarding school in Tarascon, where he has befriended a young Irish student named Sophie and her mother, Kate, who is a teacher at the school. Irene has a vision of Maurice asking her to save him. She is dispatched by the Cardinal to investigate a series of deaths across Europe, attributed to the demon Valak, due to her previous experience with the demon. She travels to Tarascon with Sister Debra, a young novice.

In Tarascon, Irene is haunted by Valak. Debra receives Noiret's rosary from Jacques. At school, Sophie is bullied by classmates and locked in the deconsecrated sealed-off chapel. The bully points out the goat on the stained-glass window, claiming that the devil appears when the sun shines and turns the goat's eyes red. One night, the headmistress encounters a sleepwalking Maurice and is killed by Valak.

Irene and Debra travel to the Palais des Papes and meet with a librarian. He explains that Valak was an angel rejected by God, and the emblem on Noiret's rosary is the family crest of St. Lucy, who was martyred during the Diocletianic persecution. Though she was set on fire, she miraculously did not burn; her eyes were gouged out, but her family recovered them. The librarian suggests the demon is killing St. Lucy's descendants because it wants this powerful relic, last known to be stored in a former monastery-turned-winery. The winery became the present-day boarding school.

At the school, Irene and Debra face off against a possessed Maurice. They use a flashlight to make the stained-glass goat's eyes glow red. The red light acts as a laser, pointing to where the eyes of St. Lucy are buried. Irene finds the relic, and the stained-glass goat vanishes, reappearing as a demonic creature in real life.

Maurice follows Sophie into the bell tower and attacks her causing the bell tower to collapse. Valak appears, lifts Irene in the air, and sets her ablaze like Father Noiret. Irene, however, does not burn as she is a descendant of St. Lucy, able to harness the power associated with the relic to Valak's frustration. Irene and Debra pray the Words of Institution as the old barrels of wine in the room become the blood of Christ, banishing the demon and freeing Maurice of possession.

The next morning, Irene looks concerned as she watches Maurice walking with Sophie and Kate.

== Cast ==
- Taissa Farmiga as Sister Irene and Saint Lucy
- Jonas Bloquet as Maurice
- Storm Reid as Sister Debra
- Anna Popplewell as Kate
- Bonnie Aarons as The Demon Nun
- Katelyn Rose Downey as Sophie

Additionally, Patrick Wilson and Vera Farmiga appear as Ed and Lorraine Warren, respectively, in the mid-credits scene, using archived footage from The Conjuring: The Devil Made Me Do It.

== Production ==
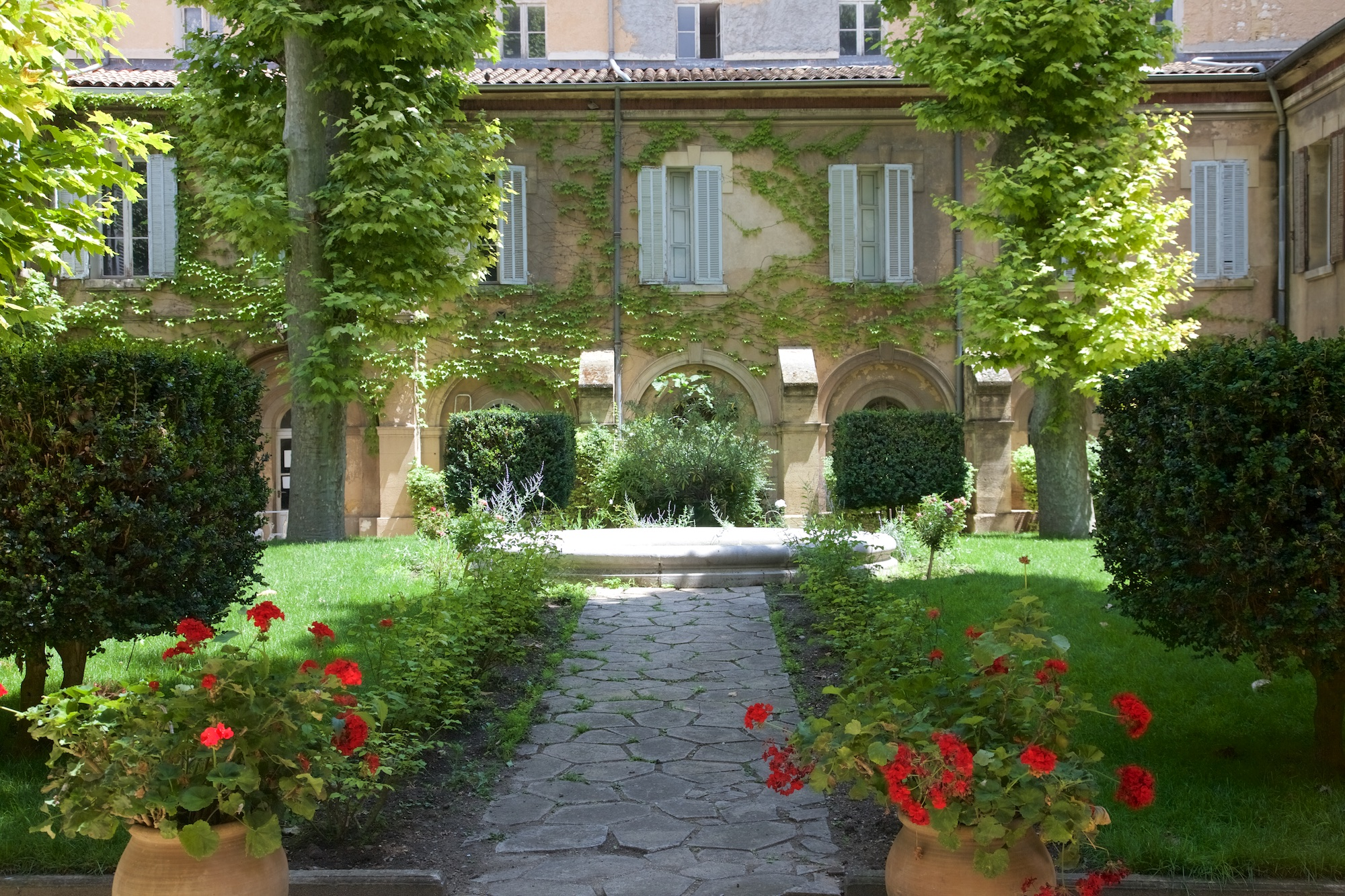
Former Couvent des Prêcheurs monastery in Aix-en-Provence, the location of the boarding school in the film

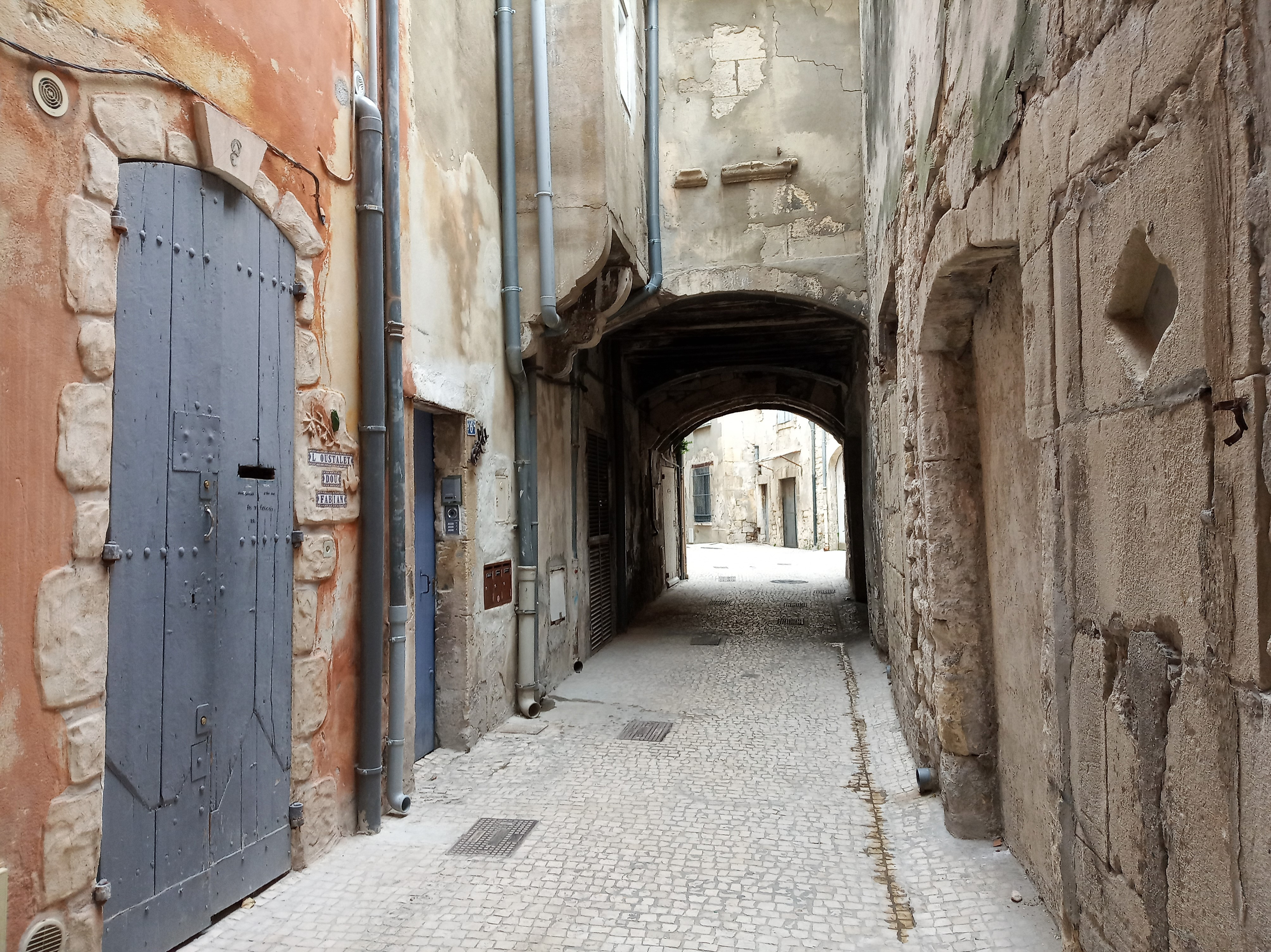
Arc de Boqui in Tarascon, one of the filming locations

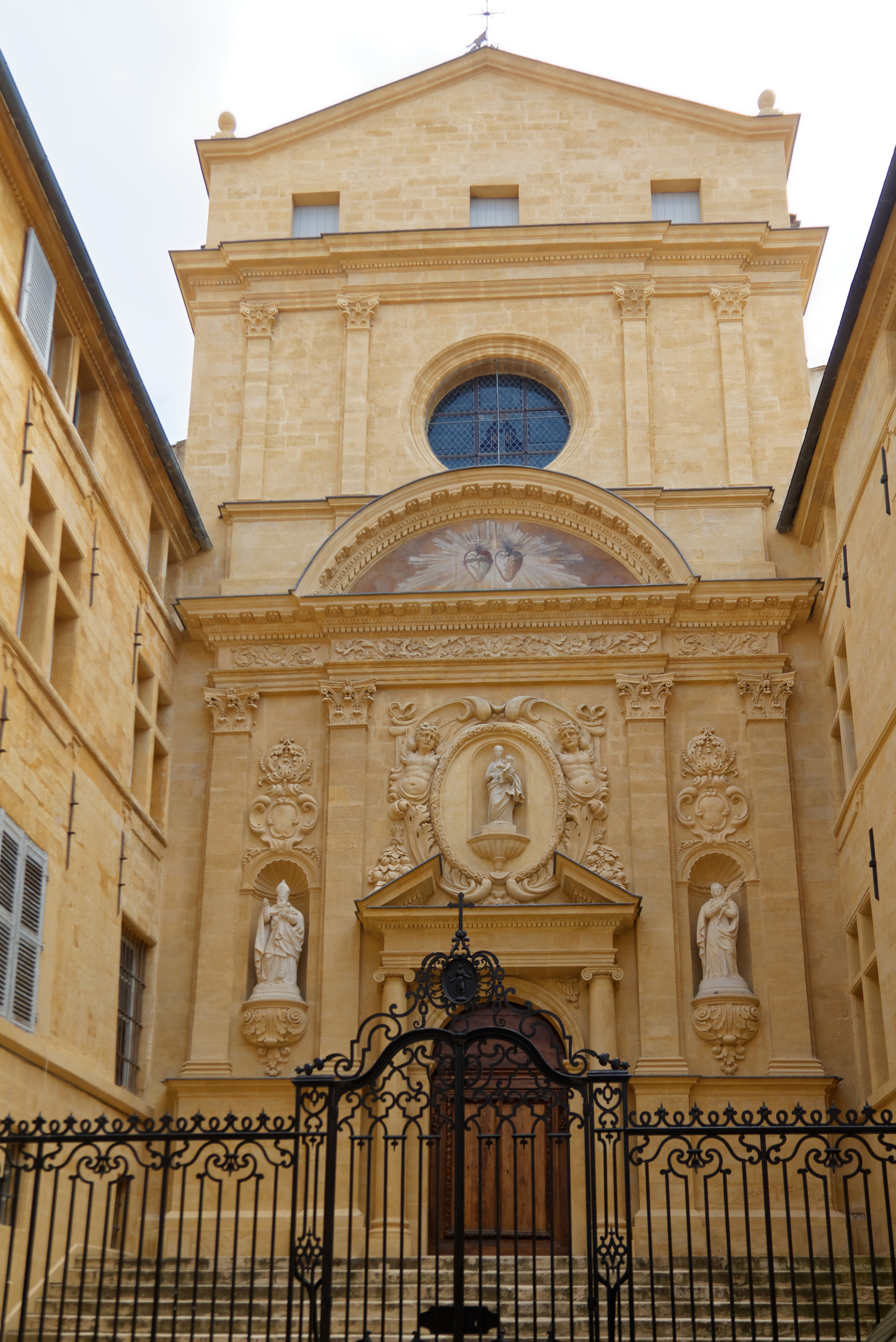
Chapelle des Ursulines a.k.a. Chapelle Sainte Catherine de Sienne in Aix-en-Provence portrays the church of Tarascon in the film.

=== Development ===
In August 2017, Wan discussed the possibility of a Nun sequel and what its story may be: "I do know where potentially, if The Nun works out, where The Nun 2 could lead to and how that ties back to Lorraine's story that we've set up with the first two Conjurings and make it all come full circle."

In April 2019, it was announced by Peter Safran that a sequel was in development. Safran stated that there was a "really fun" storyline planned for the film and commented that there was an "inevitability to another The Nun movie". Later that month, Akela Cooper signed onto the project as screenwriter while Safran and James Wan agreed to serve as producers.

In February 2022, Taissa Farmiga stated that she had had discussions with Warner Bros. Pictures to reprise her role from the first film while stating that the restrictions on the film industry as a result of the COVID-19 pandemic had delayed the project. In April 2022, Warner Bros. Pictures officially announced the movie as a part of its upcoming slate at the 2022 CinemaCon. The following day, it was announced that Michael Chaves would direct the film.

In September 2022, it was revealed that Ian Goldberg and Richard Naing had contributed as screenwriting co-authors of the most recent draft of the script.

=== Casting ===
In April 2022, James Wan confirmed that Bonnie Aarons would be reprising her role as Valak. In September 2022, Storm Reid was cast as a new lead. In October 2022, Taissa Farmiga and Jonas Bloquet were confirmed to be reprising their roles from the first film, with Anna Popplewell and Katelyn Rose Downey added to the cast later that month.

=== Filming ===
Preliminary production photography began on April 29, 2022. Filming was originally scheduled to start on September 5, 2022. Principal photography began in France on October 6, 2022, and concluded later that year. Filming locations include the former Couvent des Prêcheurs monastery in Aix-en-Provence and rue Proudhon in Tarascon.

== Release ==
The Nun II was theatrically released in the United States on September 8, 2023, by Warner Bros. Pictures and New Line Cinema.

=== Home media ===
The Nun II was released on digital download on October 3, 2023, and on Ultra HD Blu-ray, Blu-ray and DVD on November 14, 2023, by Warner Bros. Home Entertainment.

== Reception ==
=== Box office ===
The Nun II grossed $86.3 million in the United States and Canada, and $183.2 million in other territories, for a worldwide total of $269.5 million. Deadline Hollywood calculated the net profit of the film to be $85 million, when factoring together all expenses and revenues.

In the United States, The Nun II was released alongside My Big Fat Greek Wedding 3, and was projected to gross $31–34 million from 3,728 theaters in its opening weekend. The film made $13 million on its first day, including $3.1 million from Thursday night previews. It went on to debut to $32.6 million, topping the box office. In its second weekend the film made $14.5 million, dropping 55.4% and topping newcomer A Haunting in Venice ($14.3 million). The film made $8.6 million in its third weekend, topping the box office again whilst narrowly defeating another new release, Expend4bles ($8.4 million).

=== Critical response ===
On the review aggregator website Rotten Tomatoes, 51% of 136 critics' reviews are positive, with an average rating of 5.2/10. The website's consensus reads: "Scarier than its predecessor, The Nun II makes for an entertaining addition to the Conjuring franchise despite not being the most original horror sequel." Metacritic, which uses a weighted average, assigned the film a score of 47 out of 100, based on 24 critics, indicating "mixed or average" reviews. Audiences polled by CinemaScore gave the film an average grade of C+ on an A+ to F scale (up from the first film's C), while those polled at PostTrak gave it a 64% overall positive score, with 47% saying they would definitely recommend the film.

Frank Scheck of The Hollywood Reporter wrote, "The filmmaker does a fine job creating a suitably ominous atmosphere (the old-world European locations and Tristan Nyby's gloomy cinematography really help) and orchestrates the violent mayhem, much of it involving terrified little girls, with disturbing relish." The Times' Ed Potton gave the film 3/5 stars, saying it "often flirts with ridiculousness", but praised Chaves's direction, Farmiga and Downey's performances and the finale. CNN's Brian Lowry called the film "a slick if familiar addition to the very fertile Conjuring universe that, by deftly expanding on the 2018 hit, appears destined to become another cinematic habit". Dennis Harvey of Variety wrote, "In some respects an improvement on its predecessor, in others not, this is finally one more good-enough if unmemorable entry sure to extend the series' life in lucrative fashion."

Bob Smithouser of Plugged In stated that "The Nun II is one of the purest cinematic versions of palpable image over substance that I've seen in some time." Claire Shaffer of The New York Times said the film "runs like haunted clockwork, shoving characters down dark alleyways or abandoned chapels every five minutes with little justification. Scene after scene builds fear and tension, and then a monster appears, and then ... not much else, in most cases." The Sydney Morning Herald's Jake Wilson gave it 2/5 stars, writing, "The shocks are brief and not too grisly, the dingy Gothic look is as you'd expect, and the mechanical climax steers clear of the more unsettling possibilities that might have emerged if Frenchie's Jekyll and Hyde sides had been meaningfully linked." Mark Kennedy of the Associated Press gave it 1/5 stars, writing, "A new directing and writing team fails to shock or scare with a color-by-numbers plot and a meandering, languid wannabe frightfest."

=== Accolades ===
The film was nominated in the category of Outstanding Effects Simulations in a Photoreal Feature at the 22nd Visual Effects Society Awards.
