= Gregory Plotkin =

American film editor

- Born: United States
- Occupations: Film editor, director
- Years active: 1988–present

Gregory Plotkin is an American film editor and director, known for his work in horror films, including Get Out (2017), Happy Death Day (2017), Game Night (2018), and several films within the Paranormal Activity franchise. In 2015, he made his directorial debut with Paranormal Activity: The Ghost Dimension.

== Filmography ==
=== Film ===
Year	Title	Director(s)	Notes
1988	Warlords	Fred Olen Ray	Also actor as Mutant
1991	Where Sleeping Dogs Lie	Charles Finch	Also office production assistant
1993	Weekend at Bernie's II	Robert Klane	Second assistant editor
1994	Terminal Velocity	Deran Sarafian	Apprentice film editor
1994	The Road Killers	Deran Sarafian	Apprentice film editor
1994	Midnight Confessions	Allan Shustak	Production assistant
1995	The Point of Betrayal	Richard Martini	First assistant editor
1995	Gold Diggers: The Secret of Bear Mountain	Kevin James Dobson	Assistant editor
1995	Things to Do in Denver When You're Dead	Gary Fleder	Second assistant editor
1996	Flipper	Alan Shapiro	First assistant editor
1996	The Crow: City of Angels	Tim Pope	Assistant editor
1997	Truth or Consequences, N.M.	Kiefer Sutherland	Assistant editor
1997	Mortal Kombat Annihilation	John R. Leonetti	First assistant editor
1998	Saving Ryan's Privates	Craig Moss	Short film
1998	Pleasantville	Gary Ross	Visual effects, assistant editor
1999	The Insider	Michael Mann	First assistant digital editor
2000	Frequency	Gregory Hoblit	First assistant editor
2000	Pay It Forward	Mimi Leder	First assistant editor
2002	Hart's War	Gregory Hoblit	First assistant editor
2002	Cock & Bull Story	Billy Hayes	
2003	The Recruit	Roger Donaldson	First assistant editor
2003	Petersburg-Cannes Express	John Daly	
2004	The Last Shot	Jeff Nathanson	First assistant editor
2004	Friday Night Lights	Peter Berg	Associate editor
2005	Dreamer	John Gatins	Associate editor
2006	The Break-Up	Peyton Reed	First assistant editor
2007	Fracture	Gregory Hoblit	Associate editor
2008	Untraceable	Gregory Hoblit	
2008	Disfigured	Glenn Gers	
2009	He's Just Not That into You	Ken Kwapis	First assistant editor
2010	Burning Palms	Christopher Landon	
2010	Paranormal Activity 2	Tod Williams	
2010	All Good Things	Andrew Jarecki	Assistant editor
2011	Lucky	Gil Cates Jr.	
2011	Paranormal Activity 3	Henry Joost & Ariel Schulman	Also co-producer
2012	Paranormal Activity 4	Henry Joost & Ariel Schulman	Also co-producer
2013	World War Z	Marc Forster	Additional editor, uncredited
2014	Paranormal Activity: The Marked Ones	Christopher Landon	Also co-producer
2015	Nightlight	Scott Beck & Bryan Woods	Executive producer
2015	Area 51	Oren Peli	Co-producer
2015	Paranormal Activity: The Ghost Dimension	Gregory Plotkin	Directorial debut
2016	Black Mass	Gregory Plotkin	Short film, director
2017	Get Out	Jordan Peele	
2017	Happy Death Day	Christopher Landon	
2018	Game Night	John Francis Daley & Jonathan Goldstein	
2018	Hell Fest	Gregory Plotkin	Director, editor
2019	Countdown	Justin Dec	Executive producer
2020	Crimson	Gregory Plotkin	Director
2020	Come Play	Jacob Chase	
2020	Rising	Dylan Doornbos Hayes	Short film
2021	Unknown Dimension: The Story of Paranormal Activity	Joe Bandelli	Documentary film, himself
2022	Secret Headquarters	Ariel Schulman & Henry Joost	
2023	The Nun II	Michael Chaves	
2024	A Quiet Place: Day One	Michael Sarnoski	Co-edited with Andrew Mondshein
2024	Long Distance	Will Speck and Josh Gordon	
2025	The Conjuring: Last Rites	Michael Chaves	Co-edited with Elliot Greenberg
2025	Anaconda	Tom Gormican	Co-edited with Craig Alpert
2026	Insidious: Out of the Further	Jacob Chase	Co-edited with Anna Rottke

=== Television ===
Year	Title	Role	Notes
1992	The Fear Inside	Production assistant	Television movie
2016	Halloween Wars	Himself	Episode: "Mausoleum Mayhem"
2018	Made in Hollywood	Himself	Episode: "Smallfoot/Hell Fest/The Old Man and the Gun/All About Nina/Armed"

=== Thanks ===
Year	Title	Director(s)	Notes
2014	Unfriended	Levan Gabriadze	Special thanks
2014	Creep	Patrick Brice	Thanks
2017	Wish Upon	John R. Leonetti	Special thanks
2022	Scream	Matt Bettinelli-Olpin and Tyler Gillett	The producers wish to thank
2022	The Inhabitant	Jerren Lauder	Special thanks
2023	Five Nights at Freddy's	Emma Tammi	Special thanks
