= The Conjuring: The Devil Made Me Do It =

2021 American supernatural horror film

- Theatrical release poster
- Directed by: Michael Chaves
- Screenplay by: David Leslie Johnson-McGoldrick
- Story by: James Wan; David Leslie Johnson-McGoldrick
- Based on: Characters by: Chad Hayes; Carey W. Hayes
- Produced by: James Wan; Peter Safran
- Starring: Vera Farmiga; Patrick Wilson; Ruairi O'Connor; Sarah Catherine Hook; Julian Hilliard
- Cinematography: Michael Burgess
- Edited by: Peter Gvozdas; Christian Wagner
- Music by: Joseph Bishara
- Production companies: New Line Cinema; Atomic Monster; The Safran Company
- Distributed by: Warner Bros. Pictures
- Release dates: May 26, 2021 (United Kingdom); June 4, 2021 (United States)
- Running time: 112 minutes
- Country: United States
- Language: English
- Budget: $39 million
- Box office: $206.4 million

The Conjuring: The Devil Made Me Do It is a 2021 American supernatural horror film directed by Michael Chaves, with a screenplay by David Leslie Johnson-McGoldrick from a story by Johnson-McGoldrick and James Wan. The film is a sequel to The Conjuring (2013) and The Conjuring 2 (2016), and the seventh installment in The Conjuring Universe franchise. Patrick Wilson and Vera Farmiga reprise their roles as paranormal investigators and authors Ed and Lorraine Warren, with Ruairi O'Connor, Sarah Catherine Hook in her feature film debut, and Julian Hilliard also starring. Wan and Peter Safran return to produce the film, which is based on the trial of Arne Cheyenne Johnson, a murder trial that took place in 1981 Connecticut, in addition to The Devil in Connecticut, a book about the trial written by Gerald Brittle.

Initial development for a third Conjuring film began in 2016, though Wan stated that he would not be directing another film in the series due to scheduling conflicts with other projects. Safran confirmed that the next film would not be a haunted house film. By June 2017, it was officially announced that a third installment was in development, with David Leslie Johnson hired to write the screenplay. Michael Chaves was announced as the film's director, after previously directing The Curse of La Llorona (2019). Filming took place in Georgia in mid-2019.

Originally slated for a September 2020 release, the film was delayed due to the COVID-19 pandemic. The Conjuring: The Devil Made Me Do It was released by Warner Bros. Pictures and New Line Cinema in the United States on June 4, 2021, and also had a simultaneous month-long release on the HBO Max streaming service. The film grossed $206 million against a budget of $39 million and received mixed reviews from critics. A sequel, The Conjuring: Last Rites, was released in September 2025.

== Plot ==
In 1981, demonologists Ed and Lorraine Warren document the exorcism of 8-year-old David Glatzel, attended by his family, his older sister Debbie, her boyfriend Arne Johnson, and Father Gordon in Brookfield, Connecticut. In an attempt to save the little boy, Arne invites the demon to enter his body instead of David's. Ed witnesses the demon enter Arne just as the demon causes Ed to suffer a heart attack.

The following month, Ed wakes up at the hospital and reveals that he witnessed the demon enter Arne. After hallucinating a demonic entity attacking him, Arne murders his landlord by stabbing him 22 times. After the Warrens consider the acquittal of Michael Taylor for murder in England, his case becomes the first American murder trial where demonic possession is claimed as a defense. The Warrens discover a witch's totem in the Glatzel home, through which a satanic curse is passed. Kastner, a former priest who had studied the Disciples of the Ram cult, tells them that an occultist had intentionally left the totem, resulting in a curse on the Glatzels and David's possession.

When the Warrens receive notice that detectives from Danvers, Massachusetts found a similar totem in the death of Katie Lincoln, who was also stabbed 22 times, they travel there. The totem was found at the home of Katie's friend Jessica, who is missing. Lorraine learns through a vision that Jessica had murdered Katie while possessed before jumping to her death, which allows detectives to recover her body. She also witnesses the occultist attempting to make Arne kill himself but stops her, causing the occultist to become aware of the Warrens' presence.

A book of Stregherian witchcraft states that for the curse to be lifted, the occultist's altar must be destroyed. Ed is affected by the curse when a totem is discovered in the Warren's house; he almost stabs Lorraine but is stopped by their assistant Drew. Kastner reveals that the occultist is in fact his daughter, Isla. He had secretly raised her in violation of the requirement of clerical celibacy in the Catholic Church. As he researched the occult, Isla grew fascinated by it and became an occultist. He leads Lorraine into the tunnels underneath the house, where her altar is but Isla kills her father, then curses Ed and Arne, causing Ed to try to kill Lorraine and Arne to try and kill himself. Ed regains his senses when Lorraine reminds him of their love, and destroys the altar, saving Arne as well. Isla is killed by the demon she'd summoned after failing to complete the curse.

Ed places the cup from the altar in the Warrens' artifact room, along with the Valak painting and the Annabelle doll. Arne is convicted of manslaughter and serves a sentence of five years, marrying Debbie while in prison.

== Cast ==
- Vera Farmiga as Lorraine Warren
- Patrick Wilson as Ed Warren
- Ruairi O'Connor as Arne Cheyenne Johnson
- Sarah Catherine Hook as Debbie Glatzel
- Julian Hilliard as David Glatzel
- John Noble as Kastner
- Eugenie Bondurant as Isla / the Occultist
- Shannon Kook as Drew
- Ronnie Gene Blevins as Bruno
- Keith Arthur Bolden as Sergeant Clay
- Steve Coulter as Father Gordon
- Vince Pisani as Father Newman
- Ingrid Bisu as Jessica
- Andrea Andrade as Katie
- Ashley LeConte Campbell as Meryl
- Sterling Jerins as Judy Warren
- Paul Wilson as Carl Glatzel
- Charlene Amoia as Judy Glatzel

== Production ==
=== Development ===
In 2016, regarding further potential sequels, James Wan stated, "There could be many more [Conjuring] movies because the Warrens have so many stories." Screenwriters Chad and Carey W. Hayes also expressed interest in working on a story for another sequel. However, Wan stated that he may have been unable to direct the film due to his commitments to other projects. He told Collider, "Assuming we are lucky enough to have a third chapter, there are other filmmakers that I would love to sort of continue on the Conjuring world, if we are lucky enough". Wan also noted that, if a third film were to be made, it would ideally take place in the 1980s. Wan later stated that the sequel could include lycanthropy, "Maybe we can go and do it like a classic American Werewolf in London style. [...] The Warrens set against the backdrop of The Hound of Baskerville". In May 2017, Safran said it would be unlikely that a third installment would be a "haunted house" film.

In June 2017, it was announced a third installment was in development, with The Conjuring 2 co-writer David Leslie Johnson-McGoldrick hired to write the screenplay. In August 2017, Wan told Entertainment Weekly that the filmmakers had "been working hard on The Conjuring 3 ", and that "we're in the midst of working on the script, and still hashing [it] out. We want to make sure that the script is in a really good place. With how much people have loved the first two [Conjuring films], I don't want to rush in to the third one if possible." By September of the following year, producer Peter Safran stated that the script was near completion and that production would begin sometime during 2019. In May 2019, it was revealed that James Wan co-wrote the story with David Leslie Johnson-McGoldrick.

=== Pre-production ===
In October 2018, it was announced that The Conjuring 3 would not be directed by Wan but instead would be directed by The Curse of La Llorona director Michael Chaves. Wan indicated that he had been impressed while working with Chaves on The Curse of La Llorona, stating, "I got to know him as a filmmaker. Chaves' ability to bring emotion to a story, and his understanding of mood and scares, make him a perfect fit to direct the next Conjuring film."

In December 2018, Wan confirmed the film's plot details. Wan spoke with Bloody Disgusting, saying, "I think it's the first time in America's history where the defendant used possessions as a reason, as an excuse." In October 2019, Joseph Bishara—who composed the scores for The Conjuring, Annabelle, The Conjuring 2, The Curse of La Llorona and Annabelle Comes Home—was confirmed to be returning to score this third Conjuring film. In December 2019, the film's official title, The Conjuring: The Devil Made Me Do It, was revealed.

=== Casting ===
In December 2018, it was confirmed that Patrick Wilson and Vera Farmiga would reprise their roles as Ed and Lorraine Warren,respectively, from The Conjuring and The Conjuring 2. In August 2019, actress Megan Ashley Brown announced that she and Mitchell Hoog would portray young Lorraine and Ed Warren respectively. In December 2019, Sterling Jerins, Julian Hilliard, Sarah Catherine Hook and Ruairi O'Connor were all confirmed as part of the film's cast by Chaves.

=== Filming ===
Filming began on June 3, 2019, in Atlanta, Georgia. On August 15, 2019, Farmiga announced that she had finished filming her scenes. Additional photography was initially scheduled for April 2020 but was delayed due to the COVID-19 pandemic. During reshoots, Chaves opted to remove a demonic antagonist, played by Davis Osbourne. The character was supposed to be working with the Occultist, but Chaves believed it "just wasn't quite connecting", and instead gave Osbourne a role as an infirmary patient. John Noble's role was also expanded upon during reshoots.

== Release ==
=== Theatrical and streaming ===
The Conjuring: The Devil Made Me Do It was released in the United Kingdom on May 26, 2021, and in the United States on June 4, 2021, distributed by Warner Bros. Pictures and New Line Cinema. In the United States, as part of its plans for all of its 2021 films, Warner Bros. also released The Conjuring: The Devil Made Me Do It simultaneously on the HBO Max streaming service for a period of one month, after which the film was removed from the service until the normal home media release schedule period. It was delayed due to the COVID-19 pandemic's impact on theaters and the film industry, after previously being scheduled to be released on September 11, 2020. The film was re-added to HBO Max on October 21, 2021.

=== Home media ===
The Conjuring: The Devil Made Me Do It was released on Digital HD on July 23, 2021, and was released on DVD, Blu-ray, and Ultra HD Blu-ray by Warner Bros. Home Entertainment on August 24, 2021, under the title The Conjuring 3: The Devil Made Me Do It.

== Reception ==
=== Streaming viewership ===
Following its opening weekend, Samba TV reported the film was streamed in 1.6 million American households over its first three days of release. It was watched in 3 million households over the first 17 days. The film was watched in over 3 million U.S. households by the end of its first 30 days of release.

=== Box office ===
The Conjuring: The Devil Made Me Do It grossed $65.6 million in the United States and Canada, and $140.8 million in other territories, for a worldwide total of $206.4 million.

In the United States, the film was released alongside Spirit Untamed and was projected to gross $15 to 20 million from 3,100 theaters in its opening weekend. The film made $9.8 million on its first day, increasing estimates to $25 to 27 million. It ended up debuting to $24 million, the second-lowest of The Conjuring Universe franchise but still marking the third-best opening of the pandemic and topping the box office in its release weekend. The film fell 57% to $10.3 million in its sophomore weekend, finishing third, then to $5.2 million in its third weekend.

=== Critical response ===
On review aggregator Rotten Tomatoes, 56% of 253 critic reviews for the film are positive, with an average rating of 5.8/10. The website's critics consensus reads: "The Devil Made Me Do It represents a comedown for the core Conjuring films, although Vera Farmiga and Patrick Wilson keep the audience invested." On Metacritic, the film has a weighted average score of 53 out of 100 based on 39 critics, indicating "mixed or average" reviews. Audiences polled by CinemaScore gave the film an average grade of B+ on an A+ to F scale (down from the A− grade of the first two films), while PostTrak reported 78% of audience members gave it a positive score, with 58% saying they would definitely recommend it.

Carlos Aguilar of the TheWrap wrote: "The Devil Made Me Do It opens with a disturbing sequence, set in 1981, that stands as the scariest part of the supernatural saga to date. That's not to say that the nearly two hours that ensue are devoid of tension and well-paced jump scares, but the sheer chaos and malevolence on display right out of the gate are unmatched elsewhere." In his review for Variety, Owen Gleiberman praised the performances of Wilson and Farmiga but wrote: "The new film lacks that kinetic haunted-house element. It's the most somber and meditative and least aggressive of the Conjuring films." From The Hollywood Reporter, David Rooney said: "This one offers plenty of lurid fun and some genuine scares. But the grounding in dark spirituality that made the previous entries focused on the Warrens so compelling gets diluted, despite the reliably dignifying double-act of Vera Farmiga and Patrick Wilson."

Lena Wilson of The New York Times gave the film a positive review, stating that "'The Devil Made Me Do It' is an excellently spooky work of fiction. It would be even better if it privileged ghoulishness over gospel." Hanna Flint of Empire wrote "The Conjuring: The Devil Made Me Do It hits some major horror notes, with Wilson and Farmiga providing much needed heart and soul, but the new Satanic worship elements causes the franchise to take a farcical turn."

Joshua Rivera of Polygon said that "This setup makes this installment of The Conjuring feel like a supernatural detective film ... It's a pretty good idea, and a decent change of pace for the series. But The Devil Made Me Do It struggles to reach the highs of the previous movies under this new structure." Tom Jorgensen of IGN rated the film a 6 out of 10, concluding that "Though The Devil Made Me Do It is a smart recalibration for The Conjuring series, its successes have little to do with its strengths as a standalone horror movie" and that "The Conjuring: The Devil Made Me Do It is greater than the sum of its parts and functions best in how it opens the series up to new kinds of stories to tell in the future".

== Sequel ==
In October 2022, The Hollywood Reporter revealed that a fourth mainline franchise film was in development. It will be written by David Leslie Johnson-McGoldrick and produced by James Wan and Peter Safran.

== See also ==
- Exorcism in Christianity – Practice of casting out demons from a person
