= Mia Tomlinson =

English actress (born 1995)

- Born: 31 May 1995 (age 31)
- Education: King's College London
- Years active: 2020–present

Mia Tomlinson (born 31 May 1995) is a British actress. On television, she is known for her roles in the BritBox thriller The Beast Must Die and as Anne Bonny in Netflix docuseries The Lost Pirate Kingdom (both 2021). She stars as Judy Warren in the horror film The Conjuring: Last Rites.

== Early life and education ==
Tomlinson grew up in West Hampstead, North London, the eldest of three children born to mother Nichole Rees, a photographer, and father Marcus Tomlinson, a director and visual artist who has worked with fashion designers such as Philip Treacy. Tomlinson attended Fitzjohn's Primary School and then North Bridge House School. She went on to graduate from King's College London with a degree in English and French.

== Career ==
Tomlinson's first major role came in 2021 when she was cast to star in Netflix docuseries The Lost Pirate Kingdom as famed female pirate Anne Bonny. Tomlinson also had a starring role in The Beast Must Die as Lena in 2021.

In September 2024, it was announced that Tomlinson would star in a starring role as Judy Warren, the daughter of Ed and Lorraine Warren alongside Ben Hardy in the horror movie The Conjuring: Last Rites released on September 5, 2025.

== Filmography ==
=== Television ===
Year	Title	Role	Notes
2021	The Lost Pirate Kingdom	Anne Bonny	Main role
2021	The Beast Must Die	Lena	Main role

=== Film ===
Year	Title	Role	Ref
2025	The Conjuring: Last Rites	Judy Warren	

=== Audio ===
Year	Title	Role
2022-204	The Eleventh Doctor Chronicles	Roanna
