= Annabelle (film) =

2014 film by John R. Leonetti

- Theatrical release poster
- Directed by: John R. Leonetti
- Written by: Gary Dauberman
- Produced by: Peter Safran; James Wan
- Starring: Annabelle Wallis; Ward Horton; Alfre Woodard
- Cinematography: James Kniest
- Edited by: Tom Elkins
- Music by: Joseph Bishara
- Production companies: New Line Cinema; RatPac-Dune Entertainment; Atomic Monster; The Safran Company
- Distributed by: Warner Bros. Pictures
- Release dates: September 29, 2014 (TCL Chinese Theatre); October 3, 2014 (United States)
- Running time: 99 minutes
- Country: United States
- Language: English
- Budget: $6.5 million
- Box office: $257.6 million

Annabelle is a 2014 American supernatural horror film directed by John R. Leonetti, written by Gary Dauberman, and produced by Peter Safran and James Wan. Starring Annabelle Wallis, Ward Horton and Alfre Woodard, the film is a spin-off and prequel to the 2013 film The Conjuring, serving as the second installment in The Conjuring Universe franchise. It was inspired by a story about a doll named Annabelle popularized by paranormal investigators Ed and Lorraine Warren.

Principal photography began in January 2014 in Los Angeles. The film premiered at the TCL Chinese Theatre on September 29, 2014, and was released theatrically in the United States on October 3, 2014, by Warner Bros. Pictures and New Line Cinema. Produced on a $6.5 million budget, Annabelle grossed over $257 million worldwide despite negative reviews from critics. A prequel, Annabelle: Creation, was released on August 11, 2017.

== Plot ==
In 1967, in Santa Monica, California, a medical student, John Form, presents his expectant wife, Mia, with a rare vintage porcelain doll as a gift for their first child, to be placed in a collection in their daughter's nursery.

That night, after watching the news about the Tate murders and the Manson Family, the couple is disturbed by the sounds of their next-door neighbors, the Higginses, being murdered during a home invasion. While Mia calls the police, she and John are attacked by the Higginses' killers. The police arrive and shoot one killer, a man, dead while the female killer kills herself by slitting her throat inside the nursery while holding the doll. News reports identify the assailants as the Higginses' estranged daughter, Annabelle, and her boyfriend, both members of a cult.

In the days following the attack, a series of paranormal activities occur around the Forms' residence. Afterwards, Mia gives birth to a healthy baby girl, whom they name Leah. The family moves to an apartment in Pasadena, California. After finding the doll (which John had discarded since Annabelle's previous attack) in one of their boxes, another set of paranormal events plagues Mia and her daughter.

Mia calls the detective who handled the original case and learns that the cult intended to summon a demonic spirit. With the help of bookseller and fellow tenant Evelyn, Mia realizes that the cult practiced devil worship, which summoned a demon who followed the family after they moved to their apartment to claim a soul.

Upon returning home, Mia and Leah are attacked by the demon, which reveals itself while manipulating the doll. Mia and John contact their parish priest, Father Perez, who explains that demons sometimes attach themselves to inanimate objects to achieve their goals, and that a human soul must be offered for a purpose. Unable to exorcise the demon, Father Perez takes the doll to seek help from the Warrens. But before he can enter the church, the demon impersonating Annabelle's spirit attacks him and grabs the doll.

Father Perez is hospitalized, and when John checks on him, the priest warns him that the demon's true intention is to claim Mia's soul. That night, while Evelyn is visiting Mia, the demon uses Father Perez's physical form to sneak into the apartment and abduct Leah for her mother's soul. To spare her daughter, Mia attempts to jump out of the window with the doll, but John and Evelyn arrive in time to stop her. Evelyn decides to take her life in Mia's place instead as an atonement for causing a car accident that killed her daughter, Ruby, years ago. As Evelyn lies dead on the road, the demon and the doll disappear. Mia and John never see or hear of the doll again, and Leah is safe inside her crib.

Six months later, a mother buys the doll from an antique shop as a gift for her daughter Debbie, a nursing student. It is seen stored and locked away in a glass case in the Warrens' artifact room.

== Cast ==
- Annabelle Wallis as Mia Form
- Ward Horton as John Form
- Tony Amendola as Father Perez
- Alfre Woodard as Evelyn
- Kerry O'Malley as Sharon Higgins
- Brian Howe as Pete Higgins
- Eric Ladin as Detective Clarkin
- Ivar Brogger as Dr. Burgher
- Gabriel Bateman as Robert
- Shiloh Nelson as Nancy
- Tree O'Toole as Annabelle Higgins
- Robin Pearson Rose as the mother
- Amy Tipton as Camilla
- Joseph Bishara as the demonic figure

== Production ==
The film is a spin-off and prequel of the 2013 horror film The Conjuring, focusing on the origins of the Annabelle doll found in that film. The project was designed to be stand alone yet collectively catering to fans of The Conjuring. It was announced in November 2013, with John R. Leonetti attached as director. To Backstage.com, the film was one of the first in a new strategy by distributors Warner Bros. and New Line Cinema "that capitalizes on the built-in fan bases for successful films, allowing for smaller budgets and production time with a bigger payout on the back end." Casting was announced in January 2014, with Annabelle Wallis and Ward Horton playing the lead roles, and actors Eric Ladin, Brian Howe and Alfre Woodard also being announced that month.

Principal photography began on January 27, 2014, at The Book Shop in Covina, California. On February 25, 2014, filming continued at an apartment on South Normandie Avenue in Los Angeles County, where the 55-member crew shot for several days. Director Leonetti and producer Safran told reporters that the Annabelle set was "haunted" and that they thought "supernatural phenomena" had occurred there. The film was shot in sequence so that the actors were always aware of their emotional arcs.

== Music ==
On April 24, 2014, Joseph Bishara was hired to compose the music for the film. WaterTower Music released the soundtrack album on September 30, 2014.

== Reception ==
=== Box office ===
Annabelle grossed $84.3 million in North America and $172.8 million in other territories, for a worldwide total of $257 million, against a production budget of $6.5 million.

Early tracking projected Annabelle would gross around $25–27 million in its opening weekend. However, estimates declined shortly after to a range between $20–22 million. Annabelle was released on October 3, 2014, in 3,185 theatres in North America. It topped the box office in its opening day earning $15.4 million (including its $2.1 million midnight previews). In its traditional three-day opening the film debuted at #2 at the box office with $37.1 million, at an average of $11,659 per theater from 3,185 theaters after a neck-and-neck competition against Gone Girl that earned $37.5 million. The two releases were separated by $378,854. Its opening weekend gross is the 11th highest in October and the biggest for a horror genre film of 2014, surpassing The Purge: Anarchy's $28.9 million opening. Dan Fellman, president of domestic distribution at Warner Bros., said about the opening box-office performance, "we had a wonderful campaign for the film and a good date"; she added "being a spinoff of The Conjuring set it up really well and we just hit the right note." It is the second time that an October weekend has produced two $30 million or more debuts; the first was in 2008: High School Musical 3 ($42 million) and Saw V ($31 million). To Rentrak, the opening weekend crowd was evenly split between females with 51% and under 25 years with 54%. The film's theatrical run ended on December 18, 2014, and it earned a total of $84 million, becoming the 35th-highest-grossing movie of 2014 in the US.

The film was released in Russia on September 26, 2014, a week prior to its wide release and earned $2.1 million on its opening weekend, debuting at No. 3 at the Russian box office. Overseas, in its opening weekend the film earned $23.6 million from nearly 3,300 screen and 39 foreign markets for a first-weekend worldwide total of $60.8 million.

High openings of Annabelle internationally were reported in France ($3.4 million), Brazil ($3 million), the UK ($3.1 million), Argentina ($1.2 million), Spain ($1.45 million) and Germany ($1.14 million). In India Annabelle debuted at #2 behind Bang Bang! and collected $1.3 million. It set an all-time opening record for a horror film in Peru with $1.34 million which is also Warner Bros. second-biggest opening weekend of all time there overall. In Mexico, the film earned $10.9 million (including previews) on its opening weekend and broke the record for the biggest debut ever for a horror movie, and the best 2D opening. Its opening weekend gross is also the third-biggest opening overall of 2014 behind Maleficent and Transformers: Age of Extinction there. In total, the film took 59% of the total market share.

As of October 13, 2014, Annabelle has become the highest-grossing horror film in the Philippines, earning over ₱121.33 million. The film surpassed Insidious: Chapter 2's record (₱113 million), doing so after 12 days of release. The film has also become the highest-grossing horror movie in Lebanon after staying atop the box office for two weekends.

=== Critical response ===
Annabelle received generally negative reviews from critics, many of whom considered the film inferior to its predecessor. On the review aggregator website Rotten Tomatoes, 28% of 135 critics' reviews are positive, with an average rating of 4.4/10. The website's consensus reads: "Annabelle borrows unabashedly from better horror films, content to leave viewers with a string of cheap jolts that fail to build on the far more effective The Conjuring." Metacritic, which uses a weighted average, assigned the film a score of 37 out of 100, based on 27 critics, indicating "generally unfavorable" reviews. Audiences polled by CinemaScore gave the film a grade of B on an A+ to F scale.

Frank Scheck of The Hollywood Reporter criticized the film for its cheap production and screenplay, saying, "the film is ultimately so generic and formulaic that you won't forget it". He was also critical of the lead actors, calling their acting "unmemorable" and "bland".

Scott Foundas of Variety gave the film a negative review, calling the film "a cut-rate spinoff from James Wan's superlative haunted-house hit The Conjuring that (partly) makes up in crude shock effects what it lacks in craft, atmosphere, and just about every other department".

Pete Hammond of Deadline also gave the film a negative review and said that the "not-scary doll show" has left him pining for Chucky in Child's Play. He further added, "Annabelle may still draw horror fans in this Halloween month, but they won't be quaking over the scares in this film."

=== Accolades ===
Year	Award	Category	Nominee(s)	Result
2015	Empire Awards	Best Horror	Annabelle	Nominated
2015	Fangoria Chainsaw Awards	Worst Film	Annabelle	Nominated
2015	Golden Trailer Awards	Best Horror Poster	New Line Cinema / Ignition Print	Nominated
2015	MTV Movie & TV Awards	Best Scared-As-S**t Performance	Annabelle Wallis	Nominated
2015	People's Choice Awards	Favorite Thriller Movie	Annabelle	Nominated
2015	Saturn Awards	Best Horror Film	Annabelle	Nominated

== Home media ==
On January 20, 2015, the film was released in DVD and Blu-ray by Warner Home Video. On May 31, 2022, it was re-released on Blu-ray alongside all other films in The Conjuring Universe released at that point.

== Future ==
=== Prequel ===
In October 2014, Fellman told The Washington Post that the studio was considering a series based on the film, with a sequel already in the works. In October 2015, it was reported that Gary Dauberman would be returning to write the script. On March 22, 2016, Warner Bros. slated the film for release on May 19, 2017, with Lights Out director David F. Sandberg directing the film.

In June 2016, Miranda Otto and Stephanie Sigman were cast to star in the prequel. The story centers on a dollmaker, and his wife (Otto) whose daughter tragically dies. Twelve years later they decide to open their home to a nun (Sigman) and several girls from a shuttered orphanage. When the dollmaker's possessed creation Annabelle sets her sights on the children, it turns their shelter into a storm of horror.

=== Sequel ===
In April 2018, Warner Bros. announced July 3, 2019, as the release date for an as-yet untitled new film in The Conjuring franchise. Later that month, it was announced that the film would be a third Annabelle film, with Gary Dauberman signed on to write and direct, in his directorial debut. James Wan and Peter Safran would co-produce the project. The film's title, Annabelle Comes Home, was revealed in March 2019. In May 2019, the film's release date was changed to June 26, 2019.

== Popular culture/short film ==
On October 27, 2021, Warner Bros CEO Jason Kilar announced a YouTube video titled "Annabelle in Quarantine". The short film follows Annabelle in the Warner Bros. headquarters while bored in quarantine during the COVID-19 pandemic.
