= The Conjuring: Last Rites =

2025 film by Michael Chaves

- Theatrical release poster
- Directed by: Michael Chaves
- Screenplay by: Ian Goldberg; Richard Naing; David Leslie Johnson-McGoldrick
- Story by: David Leslie Johnson-McGoldrick; James Wan
- Based on: Characters by: Chad Hayes; Carey W. Hayes
- Produced by: James Wan; Peter Safran
- Starring: Vera Farmiga; Patrick Wilson; Mia Tomlinson; Ben Hardy
- Cinematography: Eli Born
- Edited by: Gregory Plotkin; Elliot Greenberg
- Music by: Benjamin Wallfisch
- Production companies: New Line Cinema; Atomic Monster; The Safran Company
- Distributed by: Warner Bros. Pictures
- Release date: September 5, 2025 (United States)
- Running time: 135 minutes
- Country: United States
- Language: English
- Budget: $55 million
- Box office: $499.3 million

The Conjuring: Last Rites is a 2025 American supernatural horror film directed by Michael Chaves and written by Ian Goldberg, Richard Naing, and David Leslie Johnson-McGoldrick. The film is the ninth installment in The Conjuring Universe franchise, and is based on the real-life investigations of the Smurl haunting case. It stars Patrick Wilson and Vera Farmiga, who reprise their roles as paranormal investigators Ed and Lorraine Warren, along with Mia Tomlinson and Ben Hardy.

The Conjuring: Last Rites was released in the United States on September 5, 2025, by Warner Bros. Pictures. The film received mixed reviews from critics and grossed $499.3 million, becoming the highest-grossing film in the series. A prequel, The Conjuring: First Communion, is set to be released on September 10, 2027.

== Plot ==
In 1964, Ed Warren and his pregnant wife Lorraine investigate a haunting involving an antique mirror. Lorraine collapses upon seeing a vision of an entity and her unborn child, and goes into labor. Ed speeds Lorraine to the hospital, but the baby is stillborn. However, Lorraine's prayers revive the baby, whom she names Judy.

Twenty-two years later, in 1986, the Smurl family moves to West Pittston, Pennsylvania. Jack and Janet Smurl share the home with Jack's parents, Mary and John, along with their four daughters: Dawn, Heather, twins Carin and Shannon, and their dog, Simon. For Heather's confirmation ceremony, John gifts her the antique mirror. During dinner, a kitchen ceiling light suddenly crashes down, narrowly missing Heather.

Due to Ed's worsening heart condition, the Warrens retire from their investigations but continue giving lectures, which are now sparsely attended. While at dinner, Judy, who has become increasingly sensitive to psychic visions, has an episode and begins to panic. Lorraine helps Judy calm down using a rhyme created when she was a child and reminds her to always shut herself off from the supernatural. Dawn and Heather attempt to dispose of the mirror, but the family continues to be terrorized by the spirits of an elderly woman, a younger woman, and an axe-wielding man. The Smurls share their story with the media, which attracts the interest of Father Gordon.

During Ed's birthday party, Judy accepts her boyfriend Tony's marriage proposal. Unable to obtain the Warrens' help, Father Gordon goes to the Diocese of Scranton. The demon attacks Gordon at the diocese and induces him to commit suicide. At Father Gordon's funeral, Judy learns from a vision that he died while investigating the Smurls' haunting. She secretly leaves for Pennsylvania to investigate, and Lorraine has a vision that warns her about Judy.

Ed, Lorraine, and Tony are led to the Smurls, and Judy convinces her reluctant parents to help. Lorraine discovers that the demon is controlling the three spirits, who are a husband who had killed his wife and her mother. Judy is knocked out after being attacked by the demon. Ed and Lorraine discover the mirror and realize it is the demon from their first investigation, deducing that the demon is hunting Judy. Unable to remove the mirror from the house, the demon possesses Judy and causes Ed to have a cardiac episode while Lorraine is attacked in the basement.

Tony rescues Lorraine, and Ed recovers. The possessed Judy attempts to hang herself but is cut down by Ed. Lorraine again uses prayer to revive Judy, and the demon attacks them. Ed fails to exorcise the mirror, and Lorraine tells Judy to embrace her psychic abilities. The Warrens recite a prayer that destroys the mirror. In the aftermath, the Smurls live in the house for three more years without further hauntings, and the remains of the mirror are kept within the Warrens' occult museum.

Sometime later, Judy walks down the aisle with Ed during her wedding to Tony. While dancing with Ed at the reception, Lorraine shares a vision she had about their future, one full of adventure and happy times spent with family.

== Cast ==
- Vera Farmiga as Lorraine Warren, a clairvoyant and a trance medium
  - Madison Lawlor as young Lorraine Warren
- Patrick Wilson as Ed Warren, a professed demonologist, author, and lecturer
  - Orion Smith as young Ed Warren
- Mia Tomlinson as Judy Warren, Ed and Lorraine's daughter
  - Emmy Nolan as 10-year-old Judy Warren
- Ben Hardy as Tony Spera, a former police officer, Judy's boyfriend and eventual husband
- Steve Coulter as Father Gordon
- Rebecca Calder as Janet Smurl
- Elliot Cowan as Jack Smurl
- Kíla Lord Cassidy as Heather Smurl
- Beau Gadsdon as Dawn Smurl
- Molly Cartwright as Shannon Smurl
- Tilly Walker as Carin Smurl
- Peter Wight as Grandpa Smurl
- Kate Fahy as Grandma Smurl
- John Brotherton as Brad Hamilton
- Shannon Kook as Drew Thomas
- Paula Lindblom as Victoria Grainger
- Leigh Jones as Abner
- Gabrielle Downey as Old Crone Ghost
- Grace Kemp as Nellie

Additionally, the real Tony Spera and Judy Warren make cameo appearances in Ed's birthday party scene. Lili Taylor and Mackenzie Foy reprise their roles as Carolyn Perron and Cindy Perron from the first film, Frances O'Connor and Madison Wolfe reprise their roles as Peggy Hodgson and Janet Hodgson from the second, and Julian Hilliard reprises his role as David Glatzel from the third. James Wan also makes a cameo. They all appear as guests at Judy's wedding, along with Natalia Safran, whose husband, Peter Safran, owns the Safran Company.

== Production ==
=== Development ===
Prior to the release of The Conjuring: The Devil Made Me Do It in June 2021, director Michael Chaves commented in an interview with Empire on the possibility of future installments in The Conjuring series: "What [The Devil Made Me Do It] hopefully does is open up this new chapter for the Warrens. This has a very unique ending to The Conjuring films. I would be excited to see where it could go from here." Actors Patrick Wilson and Vera Farmiga also expressed interest in returning. "Oh my God, I'd love to [continue]," stated Farmiga. "It's interesting, we have to up the fear in each one. Demonology is already so high-pitched and operatic." In October 2022, The Hollywood Reporter revealed that a fourth Conjuring film was in development with David Leslie Johnson-McGoldrick writing the screenplay, and James Wan and Peter Safran returning as producers.

Prior to the release of The Nun II in September 2023, Chaves stated that work on the script was likely to continue, stating that the project was intended to be seen as a "finale" of the stories in the franchise that had come before. By February 2024, Chaves was hired to once again serve as director. In September of the same year, it was announced that Ian Goldberg and Richard Naing were completing rewrites of Johnson-McGoldbrick's draft of an original story co-authored by Wan and Johnson-McGoldbrick. Ben Hardy and Mia Tomlinson were added to the cast in supporting roles.

=== Filming ===
Filming was scheduled to take place in London between September 10 and October 10, 2024, and had started by September 17. Filming concluded on November 22. Sterling Jerins was not expected to return. She was recast with Mia Tomlinson, as Jerins looked too young to play the adult Judy Warren in the film's current time period.

== Release ==
The Conjuring: Last Rites was released in the United States on September 5, 2025. Earlier screenings in other regions, such as the Philippines, Mexico, and Indonesia started on September 3, 2025.

=== Home media ===
The Conjuring: Last Rites was released on Digital HD on October 7, 2025. The film was later released on DVD, Blu-ray, and Ultra HD Blu-ray on November 25, 2025.

== Reception ==
=== Box office ===
The Conjuring: Last Rites grossed $177.8 million in the United States and Canada, and $321.4 million in other territories, for a worldwide total of $499.2 million.

In the United States and Canada, Last Rites was released alongside Hamilton, and was originally projected to gross around $50 million from 3,726 theaters in its opening weekend. After making $34.6 million on its first day, including $8.5 million in Thursday previews (both franchise records), weekend estimates were raised to $75 million. It went on to debut to $84 million, the best opening of the franchise and third-biggest ever for a horror film. It was also Warner Bros.' seventh consecutive film to open north of $40 million, a first for any studio.

In the Philippines, a market where the horror genre is widely popular, Last Rites broke the records for the highest-grossing opening day for a horror film as well as second highest for a 2025 release, the highest-grossing opening weekend for a horror film, the highest-grossing opening weekend for an R-16 film, and the highest-grossing opening weekend of 2025. During its first weekend, Last Rites held a 91% share of the total Philippine box office. In India, it surpassed Final Destination Bloodlines to become the highest grossing American horror film. In Indonesia, the film has grossed $5,344,824 in its opening weekend, making it the highest-grossing opening weekend for an international horror film in the country for 2025.

=== Critical response ===
On the review aggregator website Rotten Tomatoes, 57% of 190 critics' reviews are positive, with an average rating of 5.8/10. The website's consensus reads: "Purportedly Vera Farmiga and Patrick Wilson's final outing as the Warrens, Last Rites underwhelms as a climactic chapter for The Conjuring but solidly upholds the franchise's spooky standards." Metacritic, which uses a weighted average, assigned the film a score of 54 out of 100, based on 29 critics, indicating "mixed or average" reviews. Audiences polled by CinemaScore gave the film an average grade of B on an A+ to F scale, while 58% of those surveyed by PostTrak said they would definitely recommend the film.

Gregory Nussen for Deadline Hollywood wrote that the fourth film in the series is "appropriately terrifying, far more successful on a scare-by-scare basis than the second or third films and a really frothy return to the aesthetic pleasures of Wan's first Conjuring".

=== Accolades ===
Year	Award	Category	Nominee(s)	Result	Ref.
2026	Saturn Awards	Best Horror Film	The Conjuring: Last Rites	Nominated	

== Future ==
In September 2025, it was reported that following the financial success of Last Rites, a Conjuring prequel film was in development. Reportedly, due to a pay dispute, James Wan may not be involved with the project. In January 2026, Warner Bros. revealed that the prequel would be titled The Conjuring: First Communion with a release date of September 10, 2027.
