= Michael Chaves =

American filmmaker (born 1984)

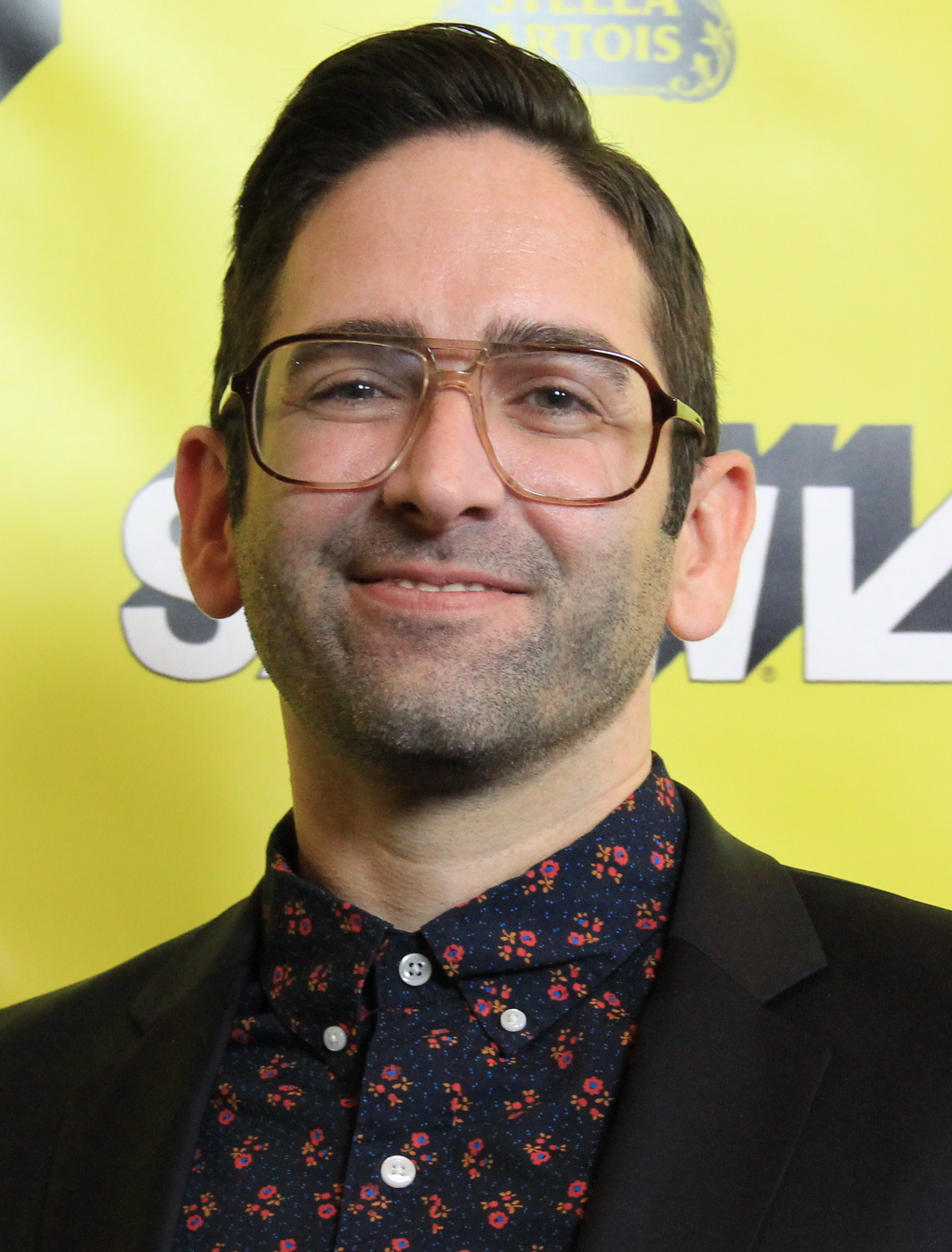
- Chaves at South by Southwest 2019
- Born: November 3, 1984 (age 42)
- Occupations: Director; screenwriter; producer; editor; visual effects artist
- Years active: 2009–present

Michael Chaves (born November 3, 1984) is an American filmmaker and visual effects artist. He is best known for directing the horror films The Curse of La Llorona (2019), The Conjuring: The Devil Made Me Do It (2021), The Nun II (2023), and The Conjuring: Last Rites (2025).

== Career ==
Chaves began directing several short films including The Maiden, which won the Best Super Short Horror Film Award at Shriekfest 2016. He also created the television series Chase Champion, and directed all of the episodes. In 2017, he directed additional photography on The Nun (2018), alongside the film's director Corin Hardy.

He transitioned to feature-length filmmaking with the horror films The Curse of La Llorona (2019), The Conjuring: The Devil Made Me Do It (2021), The Nun II (2023), and The Conjuring: Last Rites (2025), all produced by James Wan. The latter three films are the seventh, eighth, and ninth installments of The Conjuring Universe, respectively.

Michael Chaves is currently signed on to direct another horror film, The Reckoning, for Michael Bay, Bradley Fuller, and Andrew Form, under Platinum Dunes, with a script written by Patrick Melton and Marcus Dunstan.

In January 2026, it was announced that Chaves would make his comic-book debut with Corpse Knight for Skybound Entertainment and published by Image Comics. A six-issue miniseries written by Chaves, illustrated by Matthew Roberts, and colored by Rico Renzi, the series follows a young girl named Foy whose father has mysteriously returned from the dead to protect her. The first issue goes on sale April 22 that same year.

In March 2026, he signed on to direct the creature feature Yeti.

== Filmography ==
Film

Year	Title	Director	Executive producer	Notes
2018	The Nun	Additional photography	No	
2019	The Curse of La Llorona	Yes	No	
2021	The Conjuring: The Devil Made Me Do It	Yes	No	
2023	The Nun II	Yes	No	
2025	The Conjuring: Last Rites	Yes	Yes	
TBA	Yeti †	Yes	No	Post-production

Music video

Year	Title	Artist	Ref.
2019	"Bury a Friend"	Billie Eilish	

Short film

Year	Title	Director	Writer	Editor	VFX
2009	Worst Date Ever	Yes	No	Yes	No
2010	Regen	Yes	Yes	Yes	Yes
2014	Massacre Lake	No	No	No	Yes
2014	Make Note of Every Sound	Yes	No	No	No
2016	The Maiden	Yes	Yes	No	No

Web series

Year	Title	Director	Writer	VFX	Notes
2010	The Guild	No	No	Yes	2 episodes
2015	Chase Champion	Yes	Yes	No	11 episodes

== Bibliography ==
- Corpse Knight (2026)
