= Ed and Lorraine Warren =

American paranormal investigators and authors

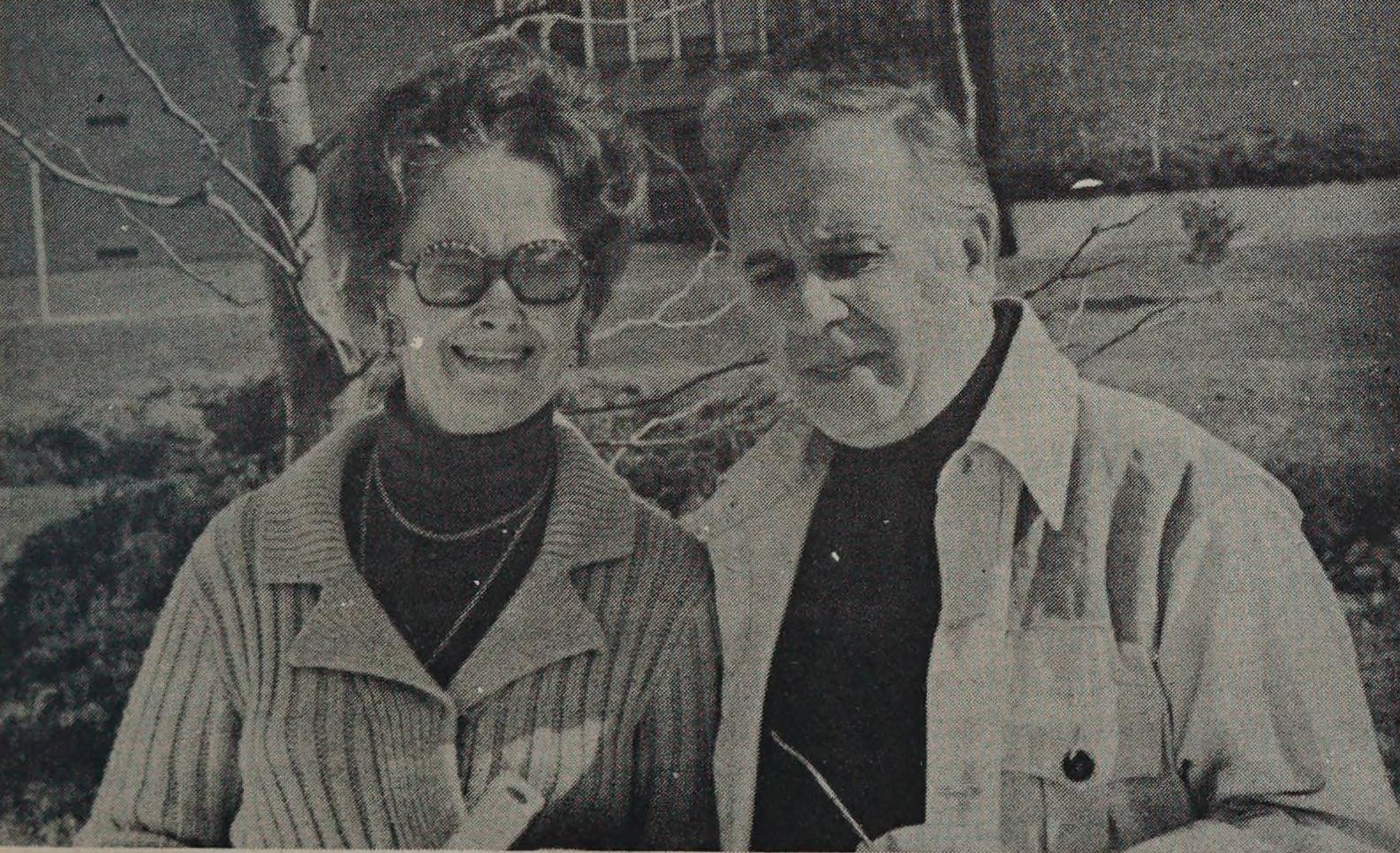
- Ed (right) and Lorraine (left) Warren in 1978
- Occupations: Paranormal investigators; authors
- Organization: New England Society for Psychic Research
- Children: 1

Ed Warren
- Born: Edward Warren Miney; September 7, 1926; Bridgeport, Connecticut, U.S.
- Died: August 23, 2006 (aged 79); Monroe, Connecticut, U.S.

Lorraine Warren
- Born: Lorraine Rita Moran; January 31, 1927; Bridgeport, Connecticut, U.S.
- Died: April 18, 2019 (aged 92); Monroe, Connecticut, U.S.
- Website: warrens.net

Edward Warren Miney (September 7, 1926 – August 23, 2006) and Lorraine Rita Warren (née Moran; January 31, 1927 – April 18, 2019) were American paranormal investigators and authors associated with prominent cases of alleged hauntings. Edward was a self-taught and self-professed demonologist, author, lecturer and artist. Lorraine professed to be clairvoyant and a light trance medium who worked closely with her husband.

In 1952, the Warrens founded the New England Society for Psychic Research (NESPR), the oldest ghost-hunting group in New England. They authored many books about the paranormal and about their private investigations into various reports of paranormal activity. They claimed to have investigated well over 10,000 cases during their career. The Warrens were among the first investigators in the Amityville haunting. According to the Warrens, the official website of the NESPR, Viviglam Magazine, and several other sources, the NESPR uses a variety of individuals, including medical doctors, researchers, police officers, nurses, college students, and members of the clergy in its investigations.

Stories of ghost hauntings popularized by the Warrens have been adapted as or indirectly inspired dozens of films, television series, and documentaries, including several films in the Amityville Horror series and the films in The Conjuring Universe.

Skeptics Perry DeAngelis and Steven Novella investigated the Warrens' evidence and called it "blarney". Skeptical investigators Joe Nickell and Benjamin Radford concluded that the better-known hauntings, Amityville and the Snedeker family haunting (dramatized in the film The Haunting in Connecticut), did not happen and had been invented.

== Notable investigations ==
=== Annabelle ===
According to the Warrens, in 1970, two roommates said their Raggedy Ann doll was possessed by the spirit of a young girl named Annabelle Higgins. The Warrens took the doll, telling the roommates it was "being manipulated by an inhuman presence", and put it on display at the family's "Occult Museum". The legend of the doll inspired several films in the Conjuring Universe and is a motif in many others.

=== Perron family ===
In 1971, the Warrens claimed that the Harrisville, Rhode Island, home of the Perron family was haunted by a witch who had lived there in the early 19th century. According to the Warrens, Bathsheba Sherman sacrificed her baby son to the devil, and after that, cursed the land so that whoever lived there died a terrible death. The story is the subject of the 2013 film The Conjuring. Lorraine Warren was a consultant to the production and appeared in a cameo role in the film. A reporter for USA Today covered the film's supposed factual grounding.

=== Amityville ===
The Warrens are best known for their involvement in the 1975 Amityville Horror, in which a New York couple, George and Kathy Lutz, said their house was haunted by a violent, demonic presence so intense that it eventually drove them out. The Amityville Horror Conspiracy authors Stephen and Roxanne Kaplan characterized the case as a hoax. Lorraine Warren told a reporter for The Express-Times newspaper that it was not. The reported haunting was the basis for the 1977 book The Amityville Horror and adapted into the 1979 and 2005 films of the same name, while also serving as inspiration for the film series that followed. The Warrens' version of events is partially adapted and portrayed in the opening sequence of The Conjuring 2 (2016). According to Benjamin Radford, the story was "refuted by eyewitnesses, investigations and forensic evidence". In 1979, lawyer William Weber said that he, Jay Anson, and the occupants invented the horror story over many bottles of wine.

=== Enfield poltergeist ===
In 1977, the Warrens investigated claims that a family in the North London suburb of Enfield was haunted by poltergeist activity. Several independent observers dismissed the incident as a hoax carried out by "attention-hungry" children, but the Warrens were convinced that it was a case of "demonic possession". The story was the inspiration for The Conjuring 2, though critics say the Warrens were involved "to a far lesser degree than portrayed in the movie". In fact, they showed up at the scene uninvited and were refused admittance to the home.

Guy Lyon Playfair, a parapsychologist who investigated the Enfield case alongside Maurice Grosse, also says the film greatly exaggerated the Warrens' role in the investigation. He said in 2016 that they "turned up once" and that Ed Warren told Playfair the Warrens "could make a lot of money [...] out of" the case. Playfair corroborated the claim that the Warrens were "not invited" to the Enfield house and that "Nobody [...] in the family had ever heard of him until [Ed Warren] turned up".

=== Arne Johnson ===
The Devil in Connecticut by Gerald Brittle was republished as a movie tie-in for the release of The Conjuring: The Devil Made Me Do It based on the Warrens' real-life Connecticut case.

In 1981, Arne Cheyenne Johnson was accused of killing his landlord, Alan Bono. The Warrens had been called before the killing to deal with the alleged demonic possession of Johnson's fiancée's brother. The Warrens subsequently claimed that Johnson was also possessed. At trial, Johnson attempted to plead Not Guilty by Reason of Demonic Possession but was unsuccessful. This story serves as the inspiration for The Conjuring: The Devil Made Me Do It (2021). The case is described in Gerald Brittle's 1983 book The Devil in Connecticut.

=== Snedeker house ===
In 1986, the Warrens arrived and declared the Snedeker house, a former funeral home, was infested by demons. The case was featured in the 1993 book In a Dark Place: The Story of a True Haunting. A TV film that later became part of the Discovery Channel series A Haunting was produced in 2002. The Haunting in Connecticut, a film based on the Warrens' version of events and directed by Peter Cornwell, was released in 2009. Horror author Ray Garton, who wrote an account of the alleged haunting of the Snedeker family in Southington, Connecticut, later called into question the veracity of the accounts in his book, saying, "The family involved, which was going through some serious problems like alcoholism and drug addiction, could not keep their story straight, and I became very frustrated; it's hard writing a non-fiction book when all the people involved are telling you different stories". To paranormal investigator Benjamin Radford, Garton said of Lorraine, "'If she told me the sun would come up tomorrow morning, I'd get a second opinion'".

=== Smurl family ===
Pennsylvania residents Jack and Janet Smurl reported their home was disturbed by numerous supernatural phenomena, including sounds, smells, and apparitions. The Warrens became involved and claimed that the Smurl home was occupied by four spirits and also a demon that allegedly sexually assaulted Jack and Janet. The Smurls' version of their story was the subject of a 1986 paperback, The Haunted, and a television film of the same name directed by Robert Mandel, as well as The Conjuring: Last Rites (2025).

=== Union Cemetery ===
Ed Warren's book Graveyard: True Hauntings from an Old New England Cemetery (St Martins Press, 1992) features a "White Lady" ghost that haunts Union Cemetery. He claimed to have "captured her essence" on film.

== Other activities ==
The Warrens trained several self-described demonologists, including Dave Considine and their nephew John Zaffis.

== Personal lives ==
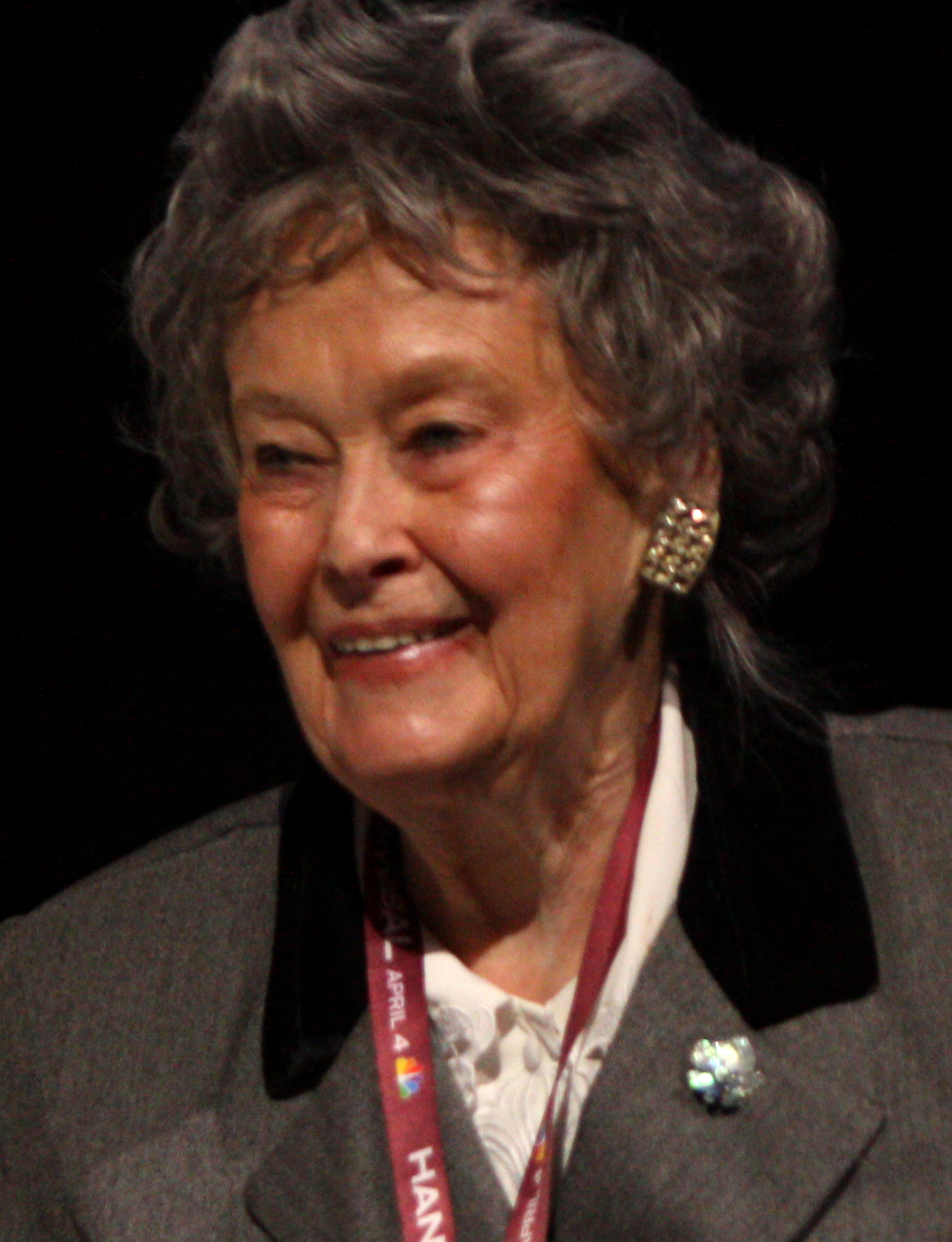
Lorraine in 2013

Ed and Lorraine Warren were members of the Roman Catholic Church. They married in 1945. On January 11, 1946, Lorraine gave birth to their daughter, Judy Warren.

The Warrens believed that demonic forces were likely to possess those who lack faith.

Ed died on Wednesday, August 23, 2006, and Lorraine died on Thursday, April 18, 2019. They are both buried at Stepney Cemetery in Monroe, Connecticut.

=== Judith Penney accusations ===
In 2017, Judith Penney claimed that she had a 40-year sexual relationship with Ed, beginning when he was 27 and she was 15. According to Penney, when she became pregnant, Lorraine persuaded her to have an abortion because the birth of a child would become a public scandal and could ruin the Warrens' business. Penney also claimed to have witnessed the couple engaged in physical abuse. Lorraine had it written into her contract for The Conjuring film series that she and Ed could not be portrayed engaging in extramarital affairs or engaging in crimes like sex with a minor. The Warrens' daughter and son-in-law said they never saw any of the alleged conduct during the decades they spent with the Warrens and Penney.

== Criticism ==
According to a 1997 interview with the Connecticut Post, Steve Novella and Perry DeAngelis investigated the Warrens for the New England Skeptical Society (NESS). They found the couple to be pleasant people but saw them "at best, as tellers of meaningless ghost stories, and at worst, dangerous frauds." They took the $13 tour and looked at all the evidence the Warrens had for spirits and ghosts. They watched the videos and looked at the best evidence the Warrens had. They concluded, "It's all blarney." They found common errors with flash photography and nothing evil in the artifacts the Warrens had collected. "They have... a ton of fish stories about evidence that got away... They're not doing good scientific investigation; they have a predetermined conclusion which they adhere to, literally and religiously," according to Novella. Lorraine Warren said the problem with DeAngelis and Novella was that "they don't base anything on a God". Novella responded, "It takes work to do solid, critical thinking, to actually employ your intellectual faculties and come to a conclusion that actually reflects reality ... That's what scientists do every day, and that's what skeptics advocate."

In an article for The Sydney Morning Herald that examined whether supernatural films are based on true events, that investigation was used as evidence to the contrary. Novella is quoted as saying that the Warrens "claim to have scientific evidence which does indeed prove the existence of ghosts, which sounds like a testable claim into which we can sink our investigative teeth. What we found was a very nice couple, some genuinely sincere people, but absolutely no compelling evidence". It was made clear that neither DeAngelis nor Novella thought the Warrens would intentionally harm anyone, but they did caution that claims like the Warrens' reinforced delusions and confused the public about scientific methodology.

== Occult Museum ==
In addition to the investigations, Lorraine ran the Warrens' Occult Museum (which closed to the public in 2019) in the back of her house in Monroe, Connecticut, with the help of her son-in-law, Tony Spera. The museum displays many claimed haunted objects and artifacts from around the world. Many of the artifacts from their most famous investigations were featured. As of 2020, the museum was owned by Judy Warren and Tony Spera.

The museum closed due to zoning issues and concerns that the house was a residential property being used for nonresidential purposes. The museum is still available to a select few individuals.

== Bibliography ==
The Demonologist: The Extraordinary Career of Ed and Lorraine Warren by Gerald Brittle was released as an ebook for the opening of The Conjuring based on the Warrens' life story.

- Ghost Hunters: True Stories From the World's Most Famous Demonologists by Ed Warren (St. Martin's Press, 1989) ISBN 0-312-03353-2
- Ghost Tracks by Cheryl A. Wicks with Ed and Lorraine Warren (AuthorHouse, 2004) ISBN 1-4184-6767-7
- Graveyard: True Hauntings from an Old New England Cemetery by Ed Warren (St Martins Press, 1992) ISBN 0-312-08202-9
- The Haunted: The True Story of One Family's Nightmare by Robert Curran with Jack Smurl and Janet Smurl and Ed and Lorraine Warren (St. Martin's Press, 1988) ISBN 0-312-01440-6
- Satan's Harvest by Ed & Lorraine Warren, Michael Lasalandra, Mark Merenda, Maurice & Nancy Theriault (Graymalkin Media, 2014; originally published 1990 by Dell Publishing) ISBN 9781631680168
- Werewolf: A True Story of Demonic Possession by Ed Warren (St. Martin's Press, 1991) ISBN 0-312-06493-4

=== Featured in ===
- Deliver Us from Evil: From the Files of Ed and Lorraine Warren, by J. F. Sawyer (Phillips Publishing Company, 1973) ISBN 9781935856856
- The Amityville Horror, a True Story by Jay Anson (Prentice Hall, 1977) ISBN 9781982138264
- The Demonologist: The Extraordinary Career of Ed and Lorraine Warren by Gerald Brittle (Berkley Books, 1980) ISBN 9781935169222
- The Devil in Connecticut by Gerald Brittle (Bantam Books, 1983) ISBN 0-553-23714-4
- In A Dark Place: The Story of a True Haunting by Ray Garton (Villard, 1992) ISBN 0-394-58902-5
- True Haunting of Borley Rectory (Conversations with Ed & Lorraine Warren: The original ghost hunters) by Taffy Sealyham (BookBaby, 2013) ISBN 9781935856085
- The Warren Case Files

== Media appearances ==
- Both Ed and Lorraine appeared on the television series In Search of..., in the episode on the Amityville Horror.
- Lorraine was featured in several episodes of the Discovery series A Haunting, in which she discusses some of the cases the pair worked on as paranormal investigators.
- Lorraine also appeared on Paranormal State, where she acted as a guest investigator.
- Both Ed and Lorraine have appeared on Scariest Places on Earth.
- Lorraine has a cameo appearance in the 2013 film The Conjuring, where she is also credited as a consultant.
- Lorraine appears in the 2012 documentary film My Amityville Horror, where she reunites with Daniel Lutz, whose family was allegedly plagued by supernatural happenings in 1975. Ed and Lorraine Warren originally visited the house after the Lutz family fled the house after 28 days of occupancy.
- Both Ed and Lorraine appeared in the 1998 pilot episode of Road Rules: All Stars credited as demonologists.

== Film adaptations ==
Over the years, several films and series have been released that are based in part or in full on the paranormal investigations or events that the Warrens are said to have witnessed and described. Films that are partly based on their story are the films from The Amityville Horror series, including The Amityville Horror (1979) and The Amityville Horror (2005). In 1991, a two-hour made-for-TV film based on the Smurl haunting, titled The Haunted, was released by 20th Century Fox. Written by Robert Curran, Jack Smurl, Janet Smurl, Ed Warren, and Lorraine Warren, the film starred Jeffrey DeMunn as Jack Smurl and Sally Kirkland as Janet Smurl. The 2009 film The Haunting in Connecticut was loosely based on the 1986 Snedeker haunting investigated by the Warrens.

=== The Conjuring Universe ===
The Warrens' case files serve as the basis for The Conjuring Universe series of horror films.

The 2013 film The Conjuring, directed by James Wan, spotlights a Warren case and stars Patrick Wilson and Vera Farmiga as Ed and Lorraine Warren. Its 2014 follow-up, Annabelle, a supernatural psychological horror film directed by John R. Leonetti, is both a prequel to and spin-off of The Conjuring and was inspired by a story of the Annabelle doll. It stars Annabelle Wallis, Ward Horton, and Alfre Woodard. The Conjuring Universe's next film was 2016's The Conjuring 2, a sequel to The Conjuring, directed by Wan, and with Farmiga and Wilson reprising their roles as Lorraine and Ed, respectively. It is based on the Enfield Poltergeist case. 2017 saw the release of another prequel, Annabelle: Creation, telling the origin story of the Annabelle doll. Farmiga and Wilson briefly appeared as Ed and Lorraine in the 2018 spin-off film The Nun, focusing on the character of Valak in its "Demon Nun" form, who was the villain from The Conjuring 2. The two reprised their roles again in Annabelle Comes Home, the sequel to Annabelle, and The Conjuring: The Devil Made Me Do It; they also reprised the roles in The Conjuring: Last Rites.
