= Garrett Wareing =

American actor (born 2001)

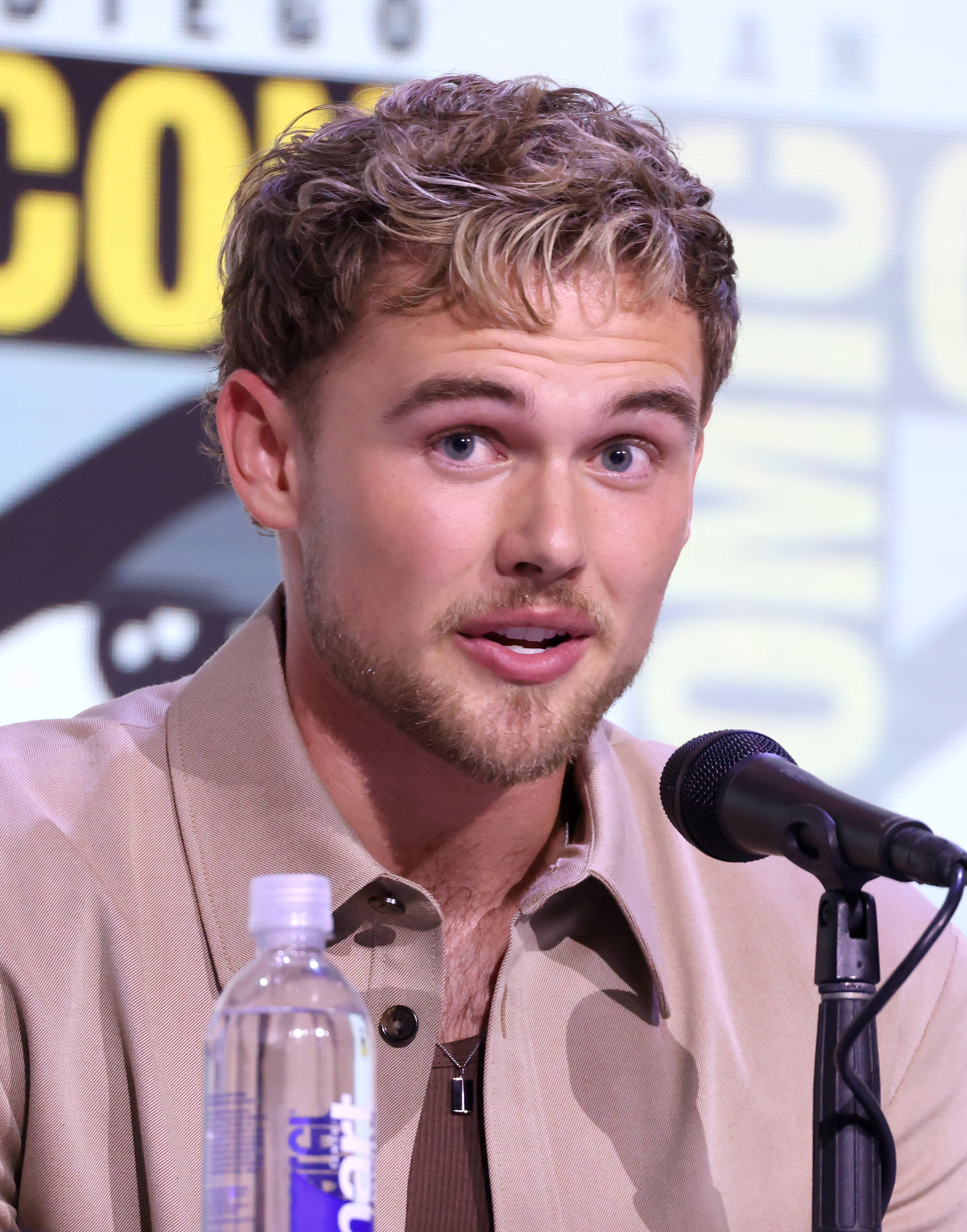
- Wareing in 2025
- Born: August 31, 2001 (age 25); College Station, Texas, U.S.
- Occupation: Actor
- Years active: 2013–present

Garrett Wareing (born August 31, 2001) is an American actor. He made his acting debut at age 13 starring opposite Dustin Hoffman in the drama film Boychoir (2014) before taking on roles in Independence Day: Resurgence (2016) and Perfect (2018).

On television, Wareing played recurring parts in Pretty Little Liars: The Perfectionists (2019) and Manifest (2020–2023), before his breakthrough in the Netflix western Ransom Canyon (2025).

== Early life ==
Wareing was born and raised in College Station, a city in Brazos County, Texas, and has stated that his "Texas roots" helped him with his role in Ransom Canyon. He has two siblings.

Wareing moved to Los Angeles to pursue his acting career after joining the International Modeling and Talent Association (IMTA) in 2013.

== Career ==
=== Beginnings (2010s) ===
After a number of roles in short films, Wareing made his feature film debut at age 13 with a role opposite Dustin Hoffman in the drama Boychoir (2014), which premiered to mixed reviews from critics. His next few films included a supporting role in the science fiction film Independence Day: Resurgence (2016) and his first lead role in the thriller Perfect (2018), both of which brought negative critics reception.

Also in 2018, he had his television debut in the third season Chicago Med episode "The Parent Trap", as Josh. The next year, Wareing appeared opposite Sasha Pieterse, Janel Parrish and Sofia Carson in the Freeform mystery thriller series Pretty Little Liars: The Perfectionists, as the latter's love interest Zach Fortson. The series was critically acclaimed despite only producing a single season, receiving a rare 100% score from Rotten Tomatoes.

=== Breakthrough (2020s) ===
Wareing began the 2020s with the recurring role of TJ Morrison in the second and fourth seasons of the NBC/Netflix supernatural horror drama series Manifest, from 2020 to 2023. Wareing's next role was that of Lucas Russell in Netflix's modern western drama series Ransom Canyon.

In 2023 and 2024, respectively, Wareing starred in the action film God Is a Bullet opposite Nikolaj Coster-Waldau, Maika Monroe, and Jamie Foxx, and the crime horror Dead Sea alongside Dean Cameron and Isabel Gravitt. Both films received negative reviews from critics. In July 2024, Wareing was cast in The Long Walk, a movie based on Stephen King's 1979 novel of the same name. Wareing starred alongside Cooper Hoffman and David Jonsson, Tut Nyuot, Charlie Plummer, Ben Wang, Jordan Gonzalez, Joshua Odjick, Roman Griffin Davis, Mark Hamill and Judy Greer.

2025 saw the actor join the cast of the forthcoming horror film Hide and Don't Speak, opposite Tanner Buchanan and Quvenzhané Wallis. The movie will be directed by Alexander J. Farrell.

Wareing appeared in Iliza Shlesinger's romantic dramedy Chasing Summer alongside Megan Mullally, Lola Tung, Tom Welling and others.

In July 2026, it was announced that Wareing would be starring in The Conjuring: First Communion, a prequel to The Conjuring, alongside Amanda Fix. Wareing will play a young Ed Warren with Fix as a young Lorraine.

== Filmography ==
=== Film ===
Year	Title	Role	Notes
2014	A Better Place	Young Jeremy	
2014	Boychoir	Stetson "Stet" Tate	
2016	Independence Day: Resurgence	Bobby	
2018	Perfect	Vessel 13	
2020	Jill	Colt	
2023	God Is a Bullet	Wood	
2024	Dead Sea	Julian	
2025	The Long Walk	Billy Stebbins	
2026	Chasing Summer	Colby	
2027	The Conjuring: First Communion	Ed Warren	Post-production
TBD	Hide and Don't Speak		Post-production

=== Television ===
Year	Title	Role	Notes
2018	Chicago Med	Josh	Episode: "The Parent Trap"
2019	Pretty Little Liars: The Perfectionists	Zach Fortson	Recurring role
2020–2023	Manifest	TJ Morrison	Recurring role (seasons 2 and 4)
2025-2026	Ransom Canyon	Lucas Russell	Series regular
