= The Long Walk (novel) =

1979 novel by Stephen King

- First edition cover
- Author: Stephen King (as Richard Bachman)
- Language: English
- Genre: Psychological horror Dystopia
- Publisher: Signet Books
- Publication date: July 3, 1979
- Publication place: United States
- Media type: Print (paperback)
- Pages: 384
- ISBN: 978-0-451-08754-6

The Long Walk is a dystopian horror novel by American writer Stephen King, published in 1979, under the pseudonym Richard Bachman. Set in a dystopian alternative version of the United States ruled by a totalitarian regime, the plot follows the contestants of a grueling annual walking contest.

While not the first of King's novels to be published, The Long Walk was the first novel he wrote, having begun it in 1966–67 during his freshman year at the University of Maine, some eight years before his first published novel, Carrie, was released in 1974.

It was collected in 1985 in the hardcover omnibus The Bachman Books, and has seen several reprints since, as both paperback and hardcover. In 2023, Centipede Press released the first stand-alone hardcover edition. In 2000, the American Library Association listed The Long Walk as one of the 100 best books for teenage readers published between 1966 and 2000. In 2025, it was adapted into a film directed by Francis Lawrence.

== Plot ==
In a fascist, post-war USA, the Squads, a secret police force led by The Major, supervises an annual competition called The Long Walk. One hundred boys continuously walk along Route 1, where they are expected to maintain a pace of 4 miles per hour (6.4 km/h). Falling below this speed for 30 seconds incurs a warning, while maintaining it for an hour erases one. If a walker receives three warnings and falls below the speed again, he is shot and killed by soldiers monitoring the event. The contest continues until only one walker remains, who may receive whatever he desires for the rest of his life.

Maine native Ray Garraty arrives at the start of the Walk on the Canada-Maine border. Other walkers include Peter McVries, whom Ray becomes close to on the first day; the enigmatic Stebbins; Hank Olson; and Art Baker. Another walker, Gary Barkovitch, tells a reporter that he is in the Long Walk to "dance on the graves" of other participants, predicting that many of them will die of exhaustion. He later provokes another walker into attacking him, resulting in the latter's death and Barkovitch being ostracized. Scramm, the odds-on Vegas favorite, confides in Ray that his pregnant wife motivates him, while Ray says that he hopes to see his girlfriend Jan in Freeport.

As the walkers' morale begins to falter, McVries tries to fight the soldiers, but is saved by Ray. That night, Ray reveals that his father was kidnapped by the Squads. Later, Stebbins tells Ray that he believes that all the walkers have a death wish. McVries tells Ray that he will sit down when he cannot walk further, and Olson is killed after attacking the guards. Scramm falls ill with pneumonia, and the other walkers agree that the winner should provide financial security to Scramm's wife. Scramm thanks the others before committing suicide by defying the soldiers.

Ray develops a charley horse and receives three warnings, but manages to recover. Ray and McVries grow closer, and Ray begins doubting his own sexuality and masculinity after suppressed memories re-emerge, especially after McVries hints that he is sexually attracted to Ray. As a result, Ray lashes out against a deteriorating Barkovitch, and Barkovitch kills himself when the rest of the walkers begin taunting him. The next morning, Ray finds that many walkers have died overnight, as Barkovitch predicted. When the walkers arrive in Freeport, Ray attempts to die in Jan's arms but is saved by McVries. In response, Abraham convinces the walkers to stop helping one another, and Ray agrees. Parker starts a revolution against the soldiers, but is killed when nobody joins him; Abraham removes his shirt and dies after catching a cold; Baker falls over and receives three warnings when nobody helps him up.

On the morning of the fifth day, Stebbins reveals to Ray and McVries that he is the Major's son, and his prize would be acceptance into the Major's household. However, Stebbins has become aware that the Major has used him as a "rabbit" to prolong the Walk, as seven walkers make it into Massachusetts. Baker, now delirious, tells Ray that he cannot walk any farther and thanks him for being his friend. Ray unsuccessfully tries to talk him out of suicide. Baker's death leaves three remaining walkers: Ray, Stebbins, and McVries. Ray tells McVries a fairy tale, causing him to fall asleep and walk toward the crowd. Ray breaks his promise and saves him, but McVries chooses to sit down and die peacefully. Ray, distraught, is beckoned by a dark figure farther ahead and decides to give up, as Stebbins cannot be beaten. When he tries to tell Stebbins, Stebbins clutches at him in horror and falls over dead.

This leaves Ray the uncomprehending winner. He ignores the Major and keeps following the dark figure (whom he believes to be another walker), declaring that there is "still so far to walk" and, hoping to catch up, even finds the strength to run.

== Characters ==
Raymond Davis "Ray" Garraty (#47)
The novel's main character and point-of-view character, a 160-pound, 16-year-old boy from Pownal. Ray's father was Squaded for his outspoken political opinion when Ray himself was very young, shaping his identity over time and leaving his mother—and himself—alone and with very little money. Ray is a natural leader, demonstrating sincerity, benevolence, and a considerable measure of discipline. He also tends to be sensitive and somewhat naïve, as well as insecure in his masculinity. Ray is more familiar with the Long Walk area, and the boys find themselves consulting and relying on him throughout their struggles; he is also one of the few Walkers who has seen a previous Walk in person. He felt a compulsion to join the Walk that he struggles to understand, but exhibits a tenacious will to live. He is played by Cooper Hoffman in the film adaptation.
Peter "Pete" McVries (#61)
Ray's closest companion and staunch ally; one of the original "Musketeers", a 167-pound, 16-year-old boy from Passaic, New Jersey, where he lived with his mother, father, and his four-year-old sister, Katrina. He is described as very fit, with black hair and a bad scar along one cheek that stands out when he is nervous, frightened, or angry. A natural leader in his own right, McVries demonstrates wit, charisma, and compassion; he is also very bitter, and despises himself after a recent traumatic breakup. McVries struggles to reconcile his own altruistic nature with the brutally competitive reality of the Walk. He encourages and often saves his companions through his actions, advice, and quick thinking; conversely, in several instances, he intentionally goads them into pushing him away. McVries is Barkovitch's foil and openly detests the other boy for his deliberate cruelty. He is played by David Jonsson in the film adaptation.
Stebbins (#88)
A loner who walks at the rear of the group, Stebbins is described as "skinny and blond, wearing purple pants and a blue chambray shirt under an old green zip sweater." Stebbins is enigmatic, sardonic, and self-assured. He is also intelligent and very insightful, with an uncanny ability to predict others' thoughts, feelings, and reactions, which he uses to rattle the other boys. He later reveals himself to be one of the Major's many illegitimate children and presumes that he was chosen for the Walk as a tool to galvanize the other Walkers and prolong the competition. He is played by Garrett Wareing in the film adaptation.
Arthur "Art" Baker (#3)
One of the original Musketeers, a 17-year-old former Night Rider from a large impoverished family in Louisiana; before the Long Walk, he was considering a career as a mortician. He is described as "young and beautiful," walks with "deceptive leisure," and speaks "with a very slight Southern accent" that he consciously suppresses. Baker is gentle, thoughtful, and soft-spoken, but he is also elusive, acquisitive, and somewhat morbid: death intrigues him, and he dwells on it constantly. He is played by Tut Nyuot in the film adaptation.
Henry "Hank" Olson (#70)
One of the original Musketeers, Olson is a boy of unknown background who is full of bluster and bravado. His audacity quickly fades, however: he becomes panicky, helpless, withdrawn, and—eventually—nearly unresponsive, though he persists with the help of McVries and Garraty. He considers himself a man of simple needs and doesn't believe in love as an earthly concept. Olson is deeply religious; his profound devotion to the Catholic faith shines through in moments of desperation and despair. He is played by Ben Wang in the film adaptation.
Gary Barkovitch (#5)
A boy from Washington, DC, described as a "dark, intense-looking boy" with olive skin, a rather sharp nose, and hooded dark brown eyes. Barkovitch is sadistic and provocative, with narcissistic tendencies. He demonstrates a craving for attention, but due to his personality, he tends to be either ignored or ridiculed, which agitates him; he is ostracized after goading a boy to his death. Scramm speculates that Barkovitch willingly joined the Walk in order to watch others suffer and die. He is loathed by most, if not all, of the other Walkers, but particularly by McVries. He is played by Charlie Plummer in the film adaptation.
Scramm (#85)
The predicted winner of the current Long Walk, he's from Arizona, where he lives with his pregnant 17-year-old wife, Cathy. He is described as a "big bull of a fellow" with a moon face, a crew cut, a "mooselike" build, and few remaining teeth. Though he is considered dim-witted, Scramm is friendly and remarkably dignified. He appears to have a great deal of respect for the Hopi. He does not appear in the film adaptation.
Abraham "Abe" (#2)
One of Garraty's companions, a 17-year-old described as "a tall boy with reddish hair in jeans and a T-shirt" as well as Oxford shoes. Abraham is droll, somber, and irritable; he applied to the Walk on an impulse, then followed through out of spite after his acceptance—an achievement he was proud of—was treated as a joke by his loved ones. He is understandably bitter about his resulting participation. He does not appear in the film adaptation.
Collie Parker
One of Garraty's companions, a boy from Joliet, Illinois, described as "a big-muscled blond in a polo shirt." Parker is naturally cocky, rowdy, and abrasive; Garraty initially dislikes Parker, believing him to be a bully. Parker mellows over time, however, and they earn each other's respect. Parker demonstrates an astonishing capacity for camaraderie and fortitude; he is the only Walker known to have successfully killed a half-track soldier. He is played by Joshua Odjick in the film adaptation.
Pearson
One of Garraty's companions. He is described as a tall young man with glasses and pants that are too big for him. Pearson is morose and enjoys poetry, game theory, and chess, and views the Walk as a competition that can be solved logically. For luck, Pearson keeps 99 pennies in one pocket and moves a penny to his other pocket whenever another Walker dies. He is played by Thamela Mpumlwana in the film adaptation.
Harkness (#49)
One of Garraty's companions, a boy described as wearing "glasses and a crewcut," with a naturally florid face. He carries a notebook to record the other Walkers' names and numbers and aspires to write a book about the Long Walk from an insider's perspective. He is played by Jordan Gonzalez in the film adaptation.
Curley (#7)
The first walker to die. After he gets a charley horse in his leg, he is unable to maintain the limit despite encouragement from Garraty, and is promptly executed. He is played by Roman Griffin Davis in the film adaptation.
The Major
The Major is described as "a tall, straight man with a deep desert tan" and a salt-and-pepper mustache wearing khakis, reflective sunglasses, and a pistol strapped to a Sam Browne belt. He appears intermittently throughout the novel, riding a "dun-colored jeep" and speaking seldomly through a battery-powered loudhailer. He is an authoritative, almost mythical figure who awes and haunts the boys in turn throughout the Walk; he is compared to both God and Mammon. He is played by Mark Hamill in the film adaptation.

== Analysis ==
Heidi Strengell describes the book as a naturalistic novel, noting King's representation of human nature through the characters. She called it one of King's "most pessimistic novels". Critic Douglas Winter similarly viewed the novel as King's most despairing work, calling it a "bleak science-fictional mirror of contemporary America". Reviewers have also categorized the novel as a metaphor for the Vietnam War. James Smythe of The Guardian connects several elements of the novel to the conflict: "the televised draft, the horror of seeing new friends die, the seeming lack of reason for it occurring in the first place".

== Film adaptation ==
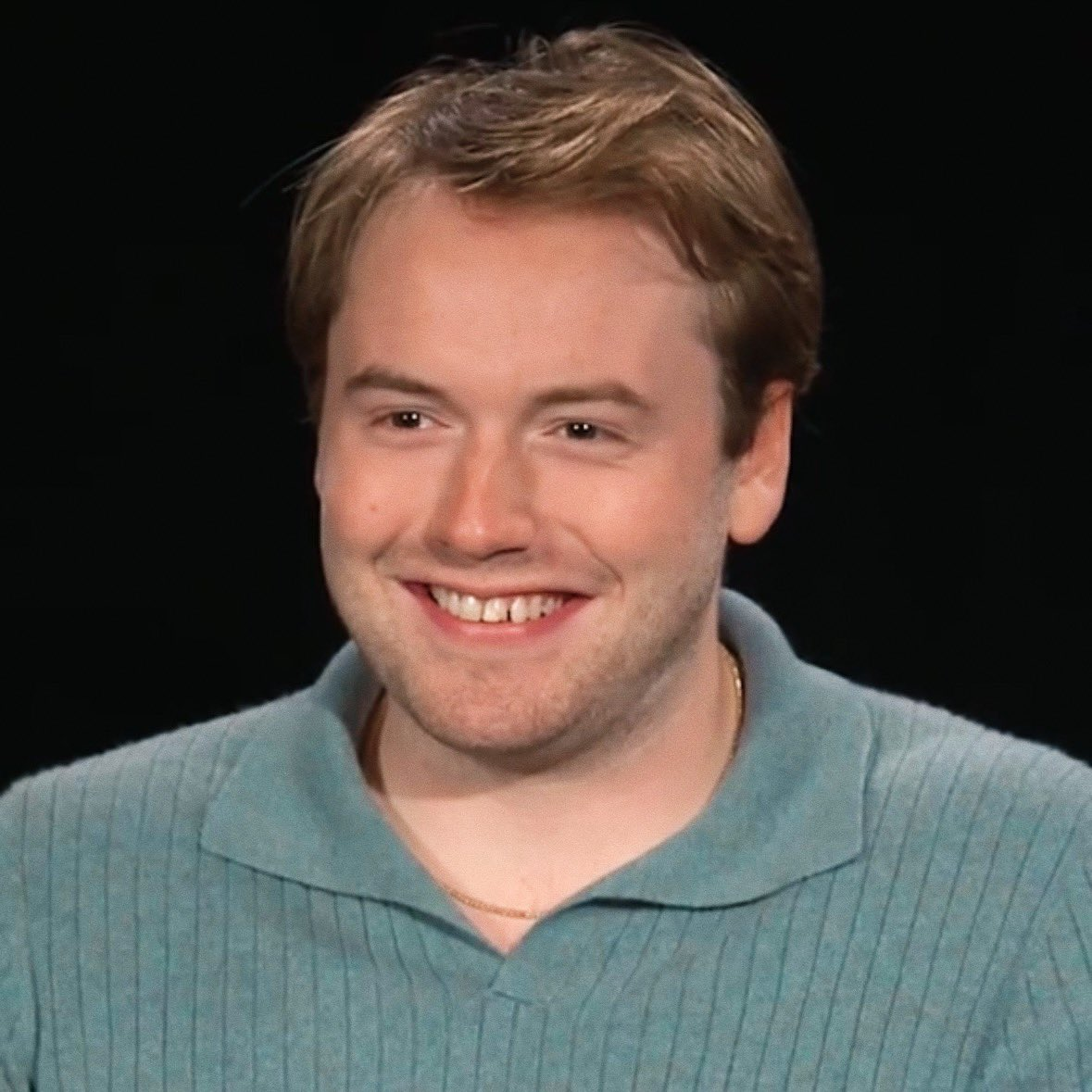
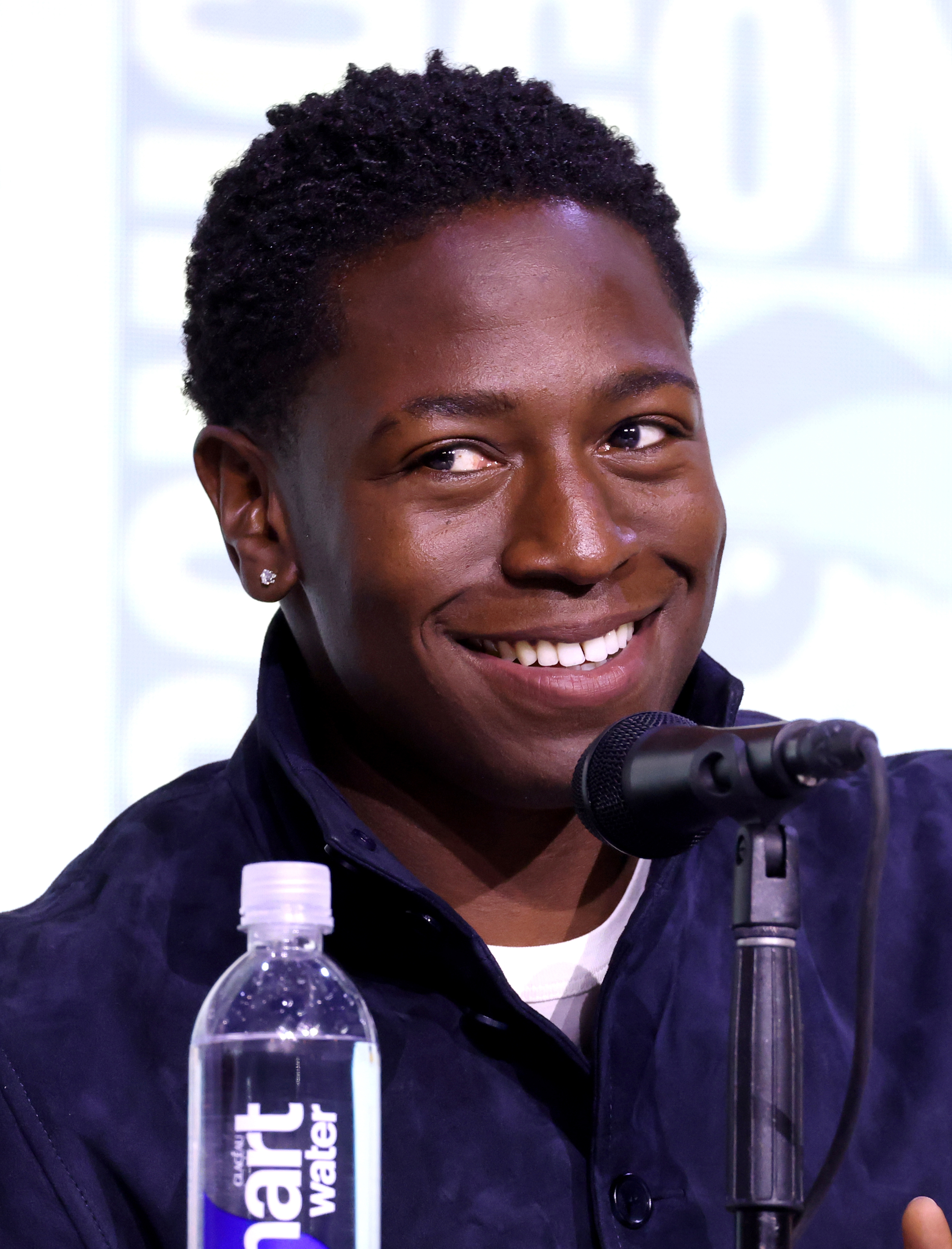
In the film, Cooper Hoffman and David Jonsson play Ray Garraty and Pete McVries, respectively.

In 1988, George A. Romero was approached to direct the film adaptation, but it never materialized. By 2007, Frank Darabont had secured the rights to the film adaptation of the novel. Darabont said that he would "get to it one day" and planned to make it low-budget, "weird, existential, and very contained". In April 2018, it was announced that New Line Cinema would develop a film adaptation of the novel. Darabont's rights to the film had lapsed, and filmmaker James Vanderbilt stepped in to write and produce the film with Bradley Fischer and William Sherak of the Mythology Entertainment production company. On May 21, 2019, New Line announced that André Øvredal would direct the adaptation, and on November 28, 2023, Øvredal was no longer attached to direct and Francis Lawrence was announced to direct the adaptation and the rights were moved to Lionsgate after it lapsed from New Line. On June 10, 2024, Cooper Hoffman and David Jonsson were announced to be in talks to star. In July, Hoffman and Jonsson were confirmed to star as Ray Garraty and Pete McVries respectively, along with Garrett Wareing, Tut Nyuot, Charlie Plummer, Ben Wang, Jordan Gonzalez, Joshua Odjick, and Roman Griffin Davis.

The film’s plot differs from the novel’s in several ways. King himself asked the filmmakers to reduce the walking pace from four miles per hour to three miles per hour (the average walking pace), as he felt the original speed was unrealistic for the duration of the marathon. The number of initial walkers is reduced to 50, with one contestant from each state. Scramm and Abraham are not present, with some of their traits instead incorporated into other characters. In the film, Ray declares that if he wins he will use his wish to ask for the Major’s carbine and then kill the Major with it to avenge his father, who was executed by the Major. After Stebbins dies third-to-last instead of as the runner-up, Ray sacrifices himself to allow Pete to win, and Pete fulfills Ray's wish.

== See also ==
- Battle Royale – 1999 novel by Koushun Takami
- Death march – Forced relocation under the threat of death
- Delta Force selection process
- The Hunger Games – Young adult book series by Suzanne Collins
- They Shoot Horses, Don't They? – 1969 film directed by Sydney Pollack
