= Independent Spirit Robert Altman Award =

Film award

Robert Altman Award
- Awarded for: Best ensemble cast, director and casting director of a film
- Presented by: Independent Spirit Awards
- First award: I'm Not There (2007)
- Currently held by: The Long Walk (2025)
- Website: spiritawards.com

The Independent Spirit Robert Altman Award is presented to the ensemble cast, director and casting director of a film by the Film Independent, a non-profit organization dedicated to independent film and independent filmmakers. It is named after director, screenwriter, and producer Robert Altman, who is considered a "maverick" in naturalistic films.

The award was created as a tribute after his death during the 2007 ceremony. The following year, it became a competitive category where a movie wins directly, without any nominees. The winner was I'm Not There. Two of its recipients, Marcus Carl Franklin and Cate Blanchett, were nominated for Best Supporting Male and Best Supporting Female, respectively (the latter won). The year after that, the rules changed so that the actors that win this award won't be eligible for the individual acting categories.

== Winners ==
Year	Winner	Distributing company(s)	Recipients			Ref.
Year	Winner	Distributing company(s)	Director(s)	Casting Director(s)	Cast	Ref.
2007	I'm Not There	The Weinstein Company	Todd Haynes	Laura Rosenthal	Christian Bale, Cate Blanchett, Marcus Carl Franklin, Charlotte Gainsbourg, Richard Gere, Bruce Greenwood, Heath Ledger and Ben Whishaw	
2008	Synecdoche, New York	Sony Pictures Classics	Charlie Kaufman	Jeanne McCarthy	Hope Davis, Philip Seymour Hoffman, Jennifer Jason Leigh, Catherine Keener, Samantha Morton, Tom Noonan, Emily Watson, Dianne Wiest and Michelle Williams	
2009	A Serious Man	Focus Features	Ethan Coen and Joel Coen	Ellen Chenoweth and Rachel Tenner	Richard Kind, Sari Lennick, Jessica McManus, Fred Melamed, Michael Stuhlbarg and Aaron Wolff	
2010	Please Give	Sony Pictures Classics	Nicole Holofcener	Jeanne McCarthy	Ann Guilbert, Rebecca Hall, Catherine Keener, Elizabeth Keener, Amanda Peet, Oliver Platt and Sarah Steele	
2011	Margin Call	Lionsgate, Roadside Attractions	J. C. Chandor	Tiffany Little Canfield and Bernard Telsey	Penn Badgley, Simon Baker, Paul Bettany, Jeremy Irons, Mary McDonnell, Demi Moore, Zachary Quinto, Kevin Spacey and Stanley Tucci	
2012	Starlet	Music Box Films	Sean Baker	Julia Kim	Dree Hemingway, Besedka Johnson, Karren Karagulian, Stella Maeve and James Ransone	
2013	Mud	Lionsgate, Roadside Attractions	Jeff Nichols	Francine Maisler	Joe Don Baker, Stuart Greer, Jacob Lofland, Matthew McConaughey, Ray McKinnon, Sam Shepard, Tye Sheridan, Sarah Paulson, Michael Shannon, Paul Sparks, Bonnie Sturdivant and Reese Witherspoon	
2014	Inherent Vice	Warner Bros.	Paul Thomas Anderson	Cassandra Kulukundis	Josh Brolin, Hong Chau, Martin Donovan, Jena Malone, Joanna Newsom, Joaquin Phoenix, Sasha Pieterse, Eric Roberts, Maya Rudolph, Martin Short, Serena Scott Thomas, Benicio del Toro, Katherine Waterston, Owen Wilson, Reese Witherspoon and Michael Kenneth Williams	
2015	Spotlight	Open Road Films	Tom McCarthy	Kerry Barden and Paul Schnee	Michael Cyril Creighton, Billy Crudup, Paul Guilfoyle, Neal Huff, Brian d'Arcy James, Michael Keaton, Rachel McAdams, Mark Ruffalo, Liev Schreiber, Jamey Sheridan, John Slattery and Stanley Tucci	
2016	Moonlight	A24	Barry Jenkins	Yesi Ramirez	Mahershala Ali, Patrick Decile, Naomie Harris, Alex Hibbert, André Holland, Jharrel Jerome, Janelle Monáe, Jaden Piner, Trevante Rhodes and Ashton Sanders	
2017	Mudbound	Netflix	Dee Rees	Billy Hopkins and Ashley Ingram	Jonathan Banks, Mary J. Blige, Jason Clarke, Garrett Hedlund, Jason Mitchell, Rob Morgan and Carey Mulligan	
2018	Suspiria	Amazon Studios	Luca Guadagnino	Avy Kaufman and Stella Savino	Malgosia Bela, Ingrid Caven, Lutz Ebersdorf, Elena Fokina, Mia Goth, Jessica Harper, Dakota Johnson, Gala Moody, Chloë Grace Moretz, Renée Soutendijk, Tilda Swinton, Sylvie Testud and Angela Winkler	
2019	Marriage Story	Netflix	Noah Baumbach	Douglas Aibel and Francine Maisler	Alan Alda, Laura Dern, Adam Driver, Julie Hagerty, Scarlett Johansson, Ray Liotta, Azhy Robertson and Merritt Wever	
2020	One Night in Miami...	Amazon Studios	Regina King	Kimberly Hardin	Kingsley Ben-Adir, Eli Goree, Aldis Hodge and Leslie Odom Jr.	
2021	Mass	Bleecker Street	Fran Kranz	Henry Russell Bergstein and Allison Estrin	Kagen Albright, Reed Birney, Michelle N. Carter, Ann Dowd, Jason Isaacs, Martha Plimpton, and Breeda Wool	
2022	Women Talking	Orion Pictures (through United Artists Releasing)	Sarah Polley	John Buchan and Jason Knight	Shayla Brown, Jessie Buckley, Claire Foy, Kira Guloien, Kate Hallett, Judith Ivey, Rooney Mara, Sheila McCarthy, Frances McDormand, Michelle McLeod, Liv McNeil, Ben Whishaw, and August Winter	
2023	Showing Up	A24	Kelly Reichardt	Gayle Keller	André Benjamin, Hong Chau, Judd Hirsch, Heather Lawless, James Le Gros, John Magaro, Matt Malloy, Amanda Plummer, Maryann Plunkett, Denzel Rodriguez, Michelle Williams	
2024	His Three Daughters	Netflix	Azazel Jacobs	Nicole Arbusto	Carrie Coon, Natasha Lyonne, Elizabeth Olsen, Rudy Galvan, Jose Febus, Jasmine Bracey, Jay O. Sanders and Jovan Adepo	
2025	The Long Walk	Lionsgate	Francis Lawrence	Rich Delia	Judy Greer, Mark Hamill, Cooper Hoffman, David Jonsson, Tut Nyuot, Joshua Odjick, Charlie Plummer, Ben Wang, Garrett Wareing	

== See also ==
- Screen Actors Guild Award for Outstanding Performance by a Cast in a Motion Picture
- National Board of Review Award for Best Cast
- Critics' Choice Movie Award for Best Acting Ensemble
