= India Donaldson =

American filmmaker

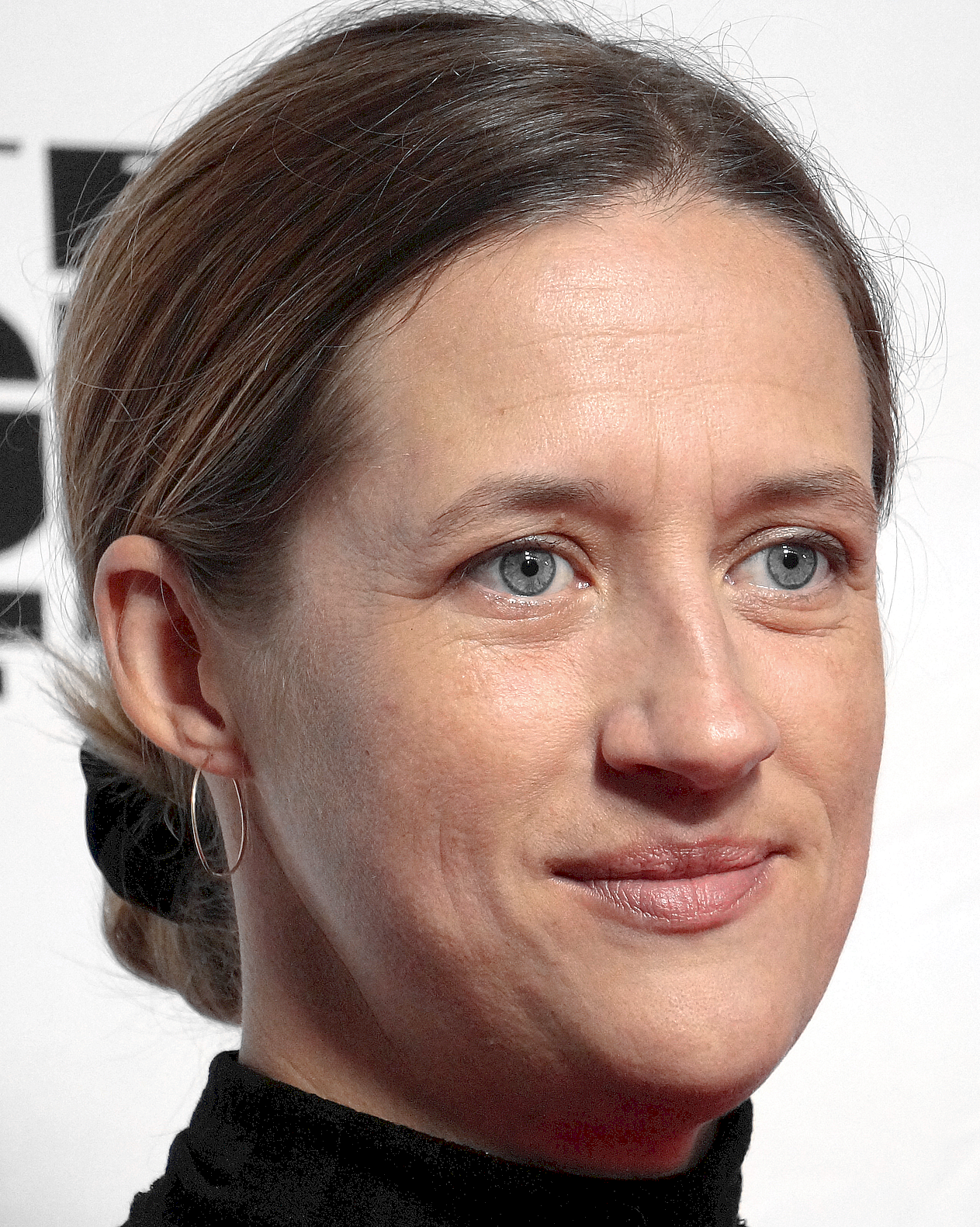
- Donaldson in 2024
- Born: 1984 or 1985 (age 40–41)
- Education: Santa Monica High School
- Alma mater: Vassar College
- Occupations: Film director; screenwriter
- Years active: 2018–present
- Children: 1
- Parent: Roger Donaldson
- Relatives: Chris Donaldson (brother)

India Donaldson (born 1984 or 1985) is an American filmmaker best known for the 2024 film Good One.

== Early life ==
India is the daughter of Mel Clark and director Roger Donaldson; she gained exposure to the film industry at an early age. Her parents divorced when she was a child. She attended Santa Monica High School and Vassar College, where she majored in English.

== Career ==
Prior to becoming a filmmaker, Donaldson worked in the textile industry. Her directorial debut, the 2018 short film Medusa, was followed by the short films Hannahs and If Found in 2019 and 2021, respectively.

Donaldson presented her feature-length debut Good One as a work-in-progress at the 2023 American Film Festival in Wrocław, where she was awarded a $50,000 prize to support the project's post-production in Poland. The completed film screened at 2024 Sundance Film Festival and the Directors' Fortnight section of the 2024 Cannes Film Festival, where it was eligible for the Camera d'Or. The film later won the Grand Jury Prize for Best American Independent Feature Film at that year's Champs-Élysées Film Festival.

In 2025, it was announced that her next film would be The Chaperones, produced by A24, with David Jonsson, Cooper Hoffman and Paul Dano in lead roles.

== Personal life ==
Donaldson resided in New York for ten years. Shortly before the COVID-19 pandemic, she and her husband moved to Los Angeles, where they currently reside. The couple lived with India's father, his third wife, and their two teenage children during the COVID-19 lockdowns. India's experiences living with her young half-siblings inspired the plot of Good One. Around this time, she gave birth to her son.

== Filmography ==
Short film

Year	Title	Notes	Ref.
2018	Medusa	Short film	
2019	Hannahs	Short film	
2021	If Found	Short film	

Feature film

Year	Title	Notes	Ref.
2024	Good One	Film debut	
TBA	The Chaperones	Post-production	

== Awards and nominations ==
Year	Award	Category	Nominated work	Result	Ref.
2019	Eastern Oregon Film Festival	Spirit of EOFF Ethos Award	Hannahs	Won	
2020	Monmouth Film Festival	Best Narrative Short Film	Hannahs	Won	
2024	Sundance Film Festival	U.S. Dramatic	Good One	Nominated	
2024	Cannes Film Festival	Directors' Fortnight	Good One	Nominated	
2024	Cannes Film Festival	Camera d'Or	Good One	Nominated	
2024	Champs-Élysées Film Festival	Grand Jury Prize for Best American Independent Feature Film	Good One	Won	
