= The Chaperones (film) =

- Directed by: India Donaldson
- Written by: Sebastian Black
- Produced by: Dede Gardner; Jeremy Kleiner; Brighton McCloskey; Robert Pattinson; Brad Pitt
- Starring: Cooper Hoffman; David Jonsson; Paul Dano; Billy Barratt; Danielle Deadwyler; Dolly de Leon; Tim Meadows; Alfred Molina
- Cinematography: Arseni Khachaturan
- Edited by: Sophie Corra
- Production companies: A24; Icki Eneo Arlo; Plan B Entertainment
- Distributed by: A24
- Country: United States
- Language: English

The Chaperones is an upcoming American crime comedy drama film directed by India Donaldson and written by Sebastian Black. The film stars Cooper Hoffman, David Jonsson, Paul Dano, Danielle Deadwyler, Billy Barratt, Alfred Molina, Tim Meadows, and Dolly de Leon.

The film is scheduled to be released in the United States by A24.

== Cast ==
- Cooper Hoffman
- David Jonsson
- Paul Dano
- Billy Barratt
- Danielle Deadwyler
- Tim Meadows
- Alfred Molina
- Gabby Beans
- Dolly de Leon

== Production ==
In September 2025, it was announced that Cooper Hoffman and David Jonsson were in talks to star in The Chaperones with A24 and Plan B Entertainment after their work The Long Walk (2025), with Donaldson directing and Sebastian Black penning the script. Robert Pattinson will produce through his production company Icki Eneo Arlo.

In November 2025, Paul Dano, Danielle Deadwyler, Billy Barratt, Tim Meadows and Alfred Molina were added to the cast and Hoffman and Jonsson were confirmed to star. Filming began the same month in Cincinnati and concluded in New Mexico in December.

== Release ==
The Chaperones is scheduled to be released by A24.
