= The Conjuring: First Communion =

Upcoming film by Rodrigue Huart

- Directed by: Rodrigue Huart
- Screenplay by: Ian Goldberg; Richard Naing
- Produced by: James Wan; Jason Blum; Peter Safran
- Starring: Garrett Wareing; Amanda Fix; Matthias Schweighöfer; Charles Parnell
- Production companies: New Line Cinema; Blumhouse Atomic; The Safran Company
- Distributed by: Warner Bros. Pictures
- Release date: September 10, 2027
- Country: United States
- Language: English

The Conjuring: First Communion is an upcoming American supernatural horror film directed by Rodrigue Huart (in his directorial debut) and written by Ian Goldberg and Richard Naing. The film is a prequel to The Conjuring (2013) and the tenth installment in The Conjuring Universe franchise. It stars Garrett Wareing, Amanda Fix, Matthias Schweighöfer, Charles Parnell, Marta Kessler and Caleb Dolden.

The film is scheduled to be released in the United States on September 10, 2027, by Warner Bros. Pictures.

== Cast ==
- Garrett Wareing as Ed Warren
- Amanda Fix as Lorraine Warren
- Matthias Schweighöfer
- Charles Parnell
- Marta Kessler
- Caleb Dolden

== Production ==
In October 2025, it was announced that a prequel to The Conjuring (2013) was in development, with Rodrigue Huart directing, and Ian Goldberg and Richard Naing writing the screenplay. In July 2026, Garrett Wareing and Amanda Fix were cast as Ed and Lorraine Warren, with Matthias Schweighöfer, Charles Parnell, Marta Kessler and Caleb Dolden also cast in undisclosed roles.

=== Filming ===
Principal photography began in Schenectady, New York on July 27, 2026, under the working title Bridgeport.

== Release ==
The Conjuring: First Communion is scheduled to be released in the United States on September 10, 2027.
