= Ray Garraty =

Stephen King character, literary character

Ray Garraty depicted in the 2025 film adaption of The Long Walk

Raymond Davis "Ray" Garraty is a fictional character and the protagonist of Stephen King's 1979 dystopian novel The Long Walk. A sixteen-year-old from Maine, Garraty participates in the Long Walk, a deadly annual walking competition in which contestants must remain at a pace of 4 mph or face execution. Cooper Hoffman portrays Garraty in the novel's 2025 film adaption, directed by Francis Lawrence.

== Characterization ==
Garraty is a sixteen-year-old from Maine who enters the Long Walk despite being unable to fully explain why he chose to participate. He serves as the reader’s primary point of view during the competition. As the Walk progresses, Garraty forms close relationships with several of the other competitors, particularly Peter McVries, while confronting the physical and psychological consequences of the event.

=== Film adaptation ===
The film changes Garraty’s motivation for entering the Long Walk. In King’s novel, Garraty is unable to clearly explain why he volunteered for the competition, whereas the film gives him a more explicit motivation connected to his father and the Major.

Director Francis Lawrence considered Cooper Hoffman his first choice to portray Garraty after seeing his performance in Licorice Pizza. Lawrence believed Hoffman would be well suited to the character, and Hoffman subsequently met with him about the role. Casting director Rich Delia said that Hoffman possessed the openness and generosity he believed Garraty required.

Hoffman said that Garraty’s grief over his father’s death immediately stood out to him when he read the screenplay. He recognized parallels between Garraty’s experience and his own experience of losing his father at a young age. Hoffman said that the similarities initially made him reluctant to take the role.

== Fictional character biography ==
=== Novel ===
In the novel, Ray Garraty is a sixteen-year-old from Pownal, Maine. His father, Jim Garraty, was taken away by the Squads when Ray was five after expressing opposition to the government and the Long Walk. Ray later volunteers for the Long Walk despite opposition from his mother and his girlfriend, Jan. During the competition, he becomes particularly close to fellow walker Peter McVries. As the number of surviving walkers dwindles, Garraty becomes increasingly physically exhausted and psychologically distressed. He ultimately becomes the final surviving walker after McVries and Stebbins die, but is so delirious that he continues walking rather than recognizing that the competition has ended.

=== Film ===
In the film, Garraty is the son of Ginnie and William Garraty. William was executed by the regime for teaching banned ideas and refusing to pledge allegiance to the government, an event that motivates Garraty’s desire for revenge against the Major.

Garraty enters the Long Walk intending to win the competition and use his prize to kill the Major, whom he holds responsible for his father’s execution. Despite his mother’s attempts to dissuade him, Garraty participates and forms a close friendship with fellow walker Peter McVries. Near the end of the competition, Garraty deliberately stops walking, sacrificing himself so that McVries can become the final surviving contestant. After winning, McVries requests a carbine as his prize and uses it to kill the Major, fulfilling Garraty’s original objective.

== Reception ==
Writing for The Guardian in 2012, James Smythe described Garraty as the reader’s “eyes on the Walk” and emphasized the character’s inability to fully explain why he entered the competition. Smythe interpreted Garraty’s experiences, particularly watching his fellow walkers die, as part of the novel’s broader metaphor for war and the psychological damage experienced by survivors.

Hoffman’s portrayal of Garraty also received critical attention following the film’s release. Critics highlighted the emotional relationship between Garraty and Peter McVries, portrayed by David Jonsson, with their friendship frequently identified as a central element of the film. Hoffman’s performance was particularly noted for conveying Garraty’s grief and increasing physical and emotional exhaustion during the Walk.

Sean Burns of WBUR praised Hoffman’s portrayal of Garraty, describing the actor as warm and welcoming and noting his ability to draw the audience into the character despite Garraty’s initially concealed motivations. Burns also praised Hoffman’s chemistry with David Jonsson as Peter McVries, writing that their camaraderie elevated the film.

David Rapp of Kirkus Reviews interpreted Garraty’s characterization in the novel as an exploration of masculinity and sexuality, pointing to his conflicted reactions to both the Major and Peter McVries. Rapp noted that this aspect of Garraty’s characterization is largely absent from the film adaptation.
