= Dead Sea (film) =

2024 Crime horror film directed by Phil Volken

- Theatrical release poster
- Directed by: Phil Volken
- Written by: Phil Volken
- Produced by: Hugh Hoang; Nicholas Davidoff; Cameron Fuller; Rick Montgomery; Alina Shraybman; Phil Volken
- Starring: Dean Cameron; Isabel Gravitt; Koa Tom; Garrett Wareing; Alexander Wraith; Genneya Walton
- Cinematography: Helge Gerull
- Music by: Gad Emile Zeitune
- Production companies: Laguna Six; 13 Films; H.T. Media Finance; Pine Tree Production; Webros Entertainment Lysa; Del Rey Films; Buffalo 8 Productions
- Distributed by: Eagle Entertainment; Synapse Distribution; Three Lines Picture; Vertical
- Release date: July 26, 2024
- Running time: 88 minutes
- Country: United States
- Language: English
- Box office: $40,949

Dead Sea (formerly known as Flycatcher) is a 2024 American crime horror film written and directed by Phil Volken. It stars Dean Cameron, Isabel Gravitt, Koa Tom, Garrett Wareing, Alexander Wraith and Genneya Walton. The film is about a young woman and her two friends that are rescued by a fishing vessel's captain, unaware that the ship harbors a chilling secret.

== Plot ==
The film centers on Kaya Adams, a resilient young woman who embarks on a jet ski adventure from Florida to The Bahamas with her best friend Tessa Miles and two acquaintances, Julian and Xander. The trip, intended as a carefree escape, takes a tragic turn when a collision between the jet skis results in Julian's death and leaves Xander severely injured. Stranded in the open sea, the survivors cling to hope until they are rescued by a fishing trawler helmed by the enigmatic Captain Rey.

Initially, the group is relieved by their rescue. However, the atmosphere aboard the trawler quickly shifts from hospitable to ominous. Captain Rey and his associate, Dr. Curtis Hunt, reveal their true intentions, they are involved in a nefarious operation involving organ trafficking. Xander, due to his critical condition, becomes the first victim, with his organs harvested for the black market. Tessa is taken captive, and Kaya narrowly escapes a similar fate.

Kaya's survival instincts kick in as she navigates the treacherous confines of the ship. She manages to kill Dr. Hunt before he can proceed with harvesting Tessa's organs. In a desperate bid for help, Kaya places Tessa on a life preserver and sets her adrift, hoping she will be found. Kaya then contacts the Coast Guard, but her actions draw the ire of Captain Rey.

Rey stabs Kaya in the abdomen. Despite her injury, Kaya retaliates by shooting a flare into Rey's mouth, killing him. She then activates a beacon tracker to signal for rescue. The following morning, the Coast Guard arrives, rescuing both Kaya and the still-drifting Tessa.

== Cast ==
- Dean Cameron as Curtis Hunt
- Isabel Gravitt as Kaya Adams
- Koa Tom as Xander
- Garrett Wareing as Julian
- Alexander Wraith as Rey
- Genneya Walton as Tessa Miles
- Al Burke as Sgt. Burke
- Brian Silverman as Russell Adams
- Phoenix Volken as Kit Adams
- Audriana Volken as Sadie

== Production ==
Written, directed and co-produced by Phil Volken (The Bay; Extortion; Garbage). Also produced by Nicholas Davidoff, Cameron Fuller, Rick Montgomery and Alina Shraybman.

The Del Rey Films-Laguna Six co-production casts Isabel Gravitt, Genneya Walton, Alexander Wraith, Dean Cameron, Garrett Wareing, Al Burke, Brian Silverman, and Koa Tom.

== Release ==
The film has limited release on July 26, 2024, distributed by Vertical (formerly known as Vertical Entertainment).
