= In Search of Fellini =

- Theatrical release poster
- Directed by: Taron Lexton
- Screenplay by: Nancy Cartwright; Peter Kjenaas
- Produced by: Michael Doven; Milena Ferreira; Monica Gil
- Starring: Ksenia Solo; Maria Bello; Mary Lynn Rajskub
- Cinematography: Kevin Garrison
- Edited by: K. Spencer Jone; Alexa Vier
- Music by: David Campbell
- Production companies: AMBI Distribution; Sunday Night
- Release date: September 15, 2017 (United States)
- Running time: 93 minutes
- Country: United States
- Language: English
- Box office: $12,772

In Search of Fellini is a 2017 American coming-of-age adventure film, directed by Taron Lexton, starring Ksenia Solo, Maria Bello and Mary Lynn Rajskub. The movie was inspired by the early years in the entertainment industry and a journey to Italy to "find herself" of Nancy Cartwright (whose Spotted Cow Entertainment sold the North American rights to AMBI Media Group).

== Plot ==
A shy small-town Ohio girl who loves movies but dislikes reality, discovers the delightfully bizarre films of Federico Fellini, and sets off on a strange, beautiful journey across Italy to find him.

== Cast ==
- Ksenia Solo as Lucy
  - Isabel Gravitt as young Lucy
    - Eva Violet as baby Lucy
- Maria Bello as Claire
  - Grace Townsend as young Claire
    - Morgan Wolk as teen Claire
- Mary Lynn Rajskub as Kerri
  - Victoria Clare as young Kerri
    - Kate Clay as teen Kerri
- Paolo Bernardini as Placido
- Gaia Diletta Bottacin as Placido's girl
- Beatrice Foffano as Placido's girl
- Beatrice Ballarin as Placido's girl
- Marika Zoccarato as Placido's girl
- Valentina Banzato as Placido's girl
- Enrico Oetiker as Pietro
  - Adam Glazer as young Pietro
- Jeff Criswell as doctor
- Debbie Scaletta as Claire's mom
- Denny Castiglione as Claire's dad
- Jay Kunzi as blonde college guy
- Alyssa Suede as Big O girl
- Angela Nordeng as Big O girl
- Anna Lerbom as Big O girl
- April Martucci as Big O girl
- Chantelle Albers as Big O girl
- Katelyn Causey as Big O girl
- Michael Wiseman as Clive Montgomery
- Lorenzo Balducci as Angelo
- Beth Riesgraf as Sylvia
- David O'Donnell as Robert
- Dan van Husen as himself
- Davide Devenuto as Guido
- Brutius Selby as Toby
- Andrea Osvárt as Cabiria
- Greta Lirussi and Marco Irrgang as couple at a party
- Francesco Foti as gendarme
- Nancy Cartwright as Cosima
- Bruno Zanin as Beppi
- Paola Altobelli as gypsy
- Mariano Aprea as Federico Fellini
- Veronica Otto as dancer
- Michela Farina as Giulietta Masina

== Reception ==
On review aggregator website Rotten Tomatoes, the film has an 89% approval rating based on 9 reviews, with an average ranking of 6.1/10. On Metacritic, the film has a weighted average score of 55 out of a 100 based on 5 critics, indicating "mixed or average" reviews.

Monica Castillo of The New York Times called it "a charming drama about the love of movies and youthful passion".

Katie Walsh of the Los Angeles Times sassily wrote of the film: "The plot makes not a lick of sense, but the imagery is striking, and the adoration of Fellini's films comes through loud and clear".

The staff-written review in The Hollywood Reporter concluded: "Where the final minutes of the movie suffer from clumsy storytelling, most of what precedes them sits well within the romantic finding-oneself comfort zone, and Solo, while not able to imbue her character with Amelie-like spark, helps keep things from getting treacly."
