= Orphan Black: Echoes =

Canadian science fiction thriller television series

- Genre: Science fiction; Drama; Thriller
- Created by: Anna Fishko
- Based on: Orphan Black by: John Fawcett; Graeme Manson
- Showrunner: Anna Fishko
- Starring: Krysten Ritter; Keeley Hawes; Amanda Fix; Avan Jogia; James Hiroyuki Liao; Rya Kihlstedt
- Theme music composer: Julien Baker
- Ending theme: "Orphan Black Theme" by Two Fingers
- Composer: Trevor Yuile
- Country of origin: Canada
- Original language: English
- No. of seasons: 1
- No. of episodes: 10

Production
- Executive producers: David Fortier; Ivan Schneeberg; Nick Nantell; Kerry Appleyard; Krysten Ritter; Katie O'Connell Marsh; Leslie Belzberg; John Fawcett; Anna Fishko
- Producer: Suzanne Colvin-Goulding
- Production locations: Toronto, Ontario, Canada
- Running time: 41–48 minutes
- Production companies: You Say Potato; Boat Rocker Studios; AMC Studios

Original release
- Network: AMC; BBC America
- Release: June 23 – August 25, 2024

Orphan Black: Echoes is a Canadian science fiction thriller television series created by Anna Fishko based on Orphan Black created by John Fawcett and Graeme Manson. The series stars Krysten Ritter and is set in 2052 in the same universe as Orphan Black. All 10 episodes of season one premiered on November 3, 2023, in Australia on Stan. It premiered on June 23, 2024, on AMC, AMC+ and BBC America. In September 2024, the series was canceled after one season.

== Premise ==
Taking place in 2052, thirty-seven years since the end of the original series, Echoes follows the life of the now adult Kira and her wife, as they try to help an amnesiac woman.

== Cast and characters ==
=== Main ===
- Krysten Ritter as Lucy, a woman who has undergone a procedure and has no memory of who she is.
  - Ritter also plays Young Dr. Eleanor Miller
- Keeley Hawes as Dr. Kira Manning, a scientist, wife of Eleanor and mother of Lucas. She is the daughter of Sarah Manning, the protagonist from the original Orphan Black series. She was previously portrayed by Skyler Wexler in the original series.
- Amanda Fix as Jules Lee, an adoptive teenager of wealthy parents who looks like Lucy/16-year-old Eleanor Miller
- Avan Jogia as Jack, Lucy's boyfriend and a former army medic and single father
- James Hiroyuki Liao as Paul Darros, a powerful self-made billionaire who runs the Darros Foundation
- Rya Kihlstedt as Dr. Eleanor Miller, a neuroscientist, Kira's wife and Lucas' mother/printed-out Eleanor

=== Recurring ===
- Reed Diamond as Tom, the Head of Corporate Security for the Darros Foundation
- Tattiawna Jones as Emily, a Corporate Security agent for the Darros Foundation and former CIA agent
- Zariella Langford-Haughton as Charlie, Jack's deaf daughter
- Jonathan Whittaker as Craig, an acquaintance of Lucy
- Jaeden Noel as Lucas Manning, Kira and Eleanor's son
- Eva Everett Irving as Tina, an acquaintance of Jack and former Special Forces officer
- Adam Kenneth Wilson as James, Jules' adoptive father
- Liam Diaz as Wes, Neva and James' adoptive son and Jules' adoptive brother
- Alex Castillo as Neva, Jules' adoptive mother
- Izad Etemadi as Dr. Josh Tartakovich, a scientist and friend of Kira
- Alice Hamid as Rhona, Lucas' girlfriend
- Vinson Tran as Xander Darros, a print-out of Paul Darros

=== Guest ===
- Jordan Gavaris as Felix Dawkins, Kira's uncle. Gavaris reprises his role from the original Orphan Black series.
- Marnie McPhail-Diamond as Dr. Pam Teller, a neuropsychologist who tells Jules she was in an accident and lost her memory. She later gives Jules a fake diary that Jules supposedly wrote.
- Kathy Baker as Melissa Miller, Eleanor's mother
- August Winter as young Kira Manning
- Evelyne Brochu as Dr. Delphine Cormier, Kira's aunt, who comes to aid Kira on behalf of her wife, Cosima. Brochu reprises her role from the original Orphan Black series.

== Production ==
In March 2019, it was reported that a new series set in the Orphan Black universe was in early development stages at AMC, to be produced by Temple Street Productions. In February 2022, it was announced that Anna Fishko would be the writer of the show and that the series would follow a new story set in the same world as Orphan Black. In April 2022, the series was greenlit and titled Orphan Black: Echoes.

In July 2022, Krysten Ritter was cast in the lead role of Lucy and it was confirmed the first season would consist of 10 episodes. In August 2022, Amanda Fix, Avan Jogia and Keeley Hawes were cast in co-starring roles, and filming began in Toronto, Ontario. Filming was completed by January 2023. In October 2023, Rya Kihlstedt and James Hiroyuki Liao were announced as series regulars, while Reed Diamond was cast in a recurring role.

== Episodes ==
Before its debut on AMC in the United States, the first season was released in its entirety in Australia on Stan.

No.	Title	Directed by	Written by	Original release date
1	"Pilot"	John Fawcett	Anna Fishko	November 3, 2023 (Australia); June 23, 2024 (United States)
2	"Jules"	John Fawcett	Sharyn Rothstein	November 3, 2023 (Australia); June 30, 2024 (United States)
3	"Pegasus Girl"	Dawn Wilkinson	Amy Louise Johnson	November 3, 2023 (Australia); July 7, 2024 (United States)
4	"It's All Coming Back"	Dawn Wilkinson	C. Quintana	November 3, 2023 (Australia); July 14, 2024 (United States)
5	"Do I Know You?"	Ingrid Jungermann	Anna Fishko	November 3, 2023 (Australia); July 21, 2024 (United States)
6	"Unless You Trusted Someone"	Ingrid Jungermann	Alex Delyle	November 3, 2023 (Australia); July 28, 2024 (United States)
7	"The Dog's Honest Truth"	Samir Rehem	Anayat Fakhraie	November 3, 2023 (Australia); August 4, 2024 (United States)
8	"The Paradox of Joyce"	Samir Rehem	Julian Camillieri & Sharyn Rothstein	November 3, 2023 (Australia); August 11, 2024 (United States)
9	"Attracting Awful Things"	Jem Garrard	Amy Louise Johnson & C. Quintana	November 3, 2023 (Australia); August 18, 2024 (United States)
10	"We Will Come Again"	John Fawcett	Story by : Alexis Burgess & Anna Fishko; Teleplay by : Anna Fishko	November 3, 2023 (Australia); August 25, 2024 (United States)

== Reception ==
On the review aggregation website Rotten Tomatoes, the first season holds an approval rating of 60%, based on 25 reviews, with an average rating of 5.7/10. The website's critical consensus reads, "Krysten Ritter and Amanda Fix bring enough distinction to ensure this new Orphan Black isn't just a clone of the original, but the latest mystery is only a faint reverb of what came before." On Metacritic, which uses a weighted average, the first season received a score of 53 out of 100 based on 13 critic reviews, indicating "mixed or average reviews".
