= Isabel Gravitt =

American actress

- Occupation: Actress
- Years active: 2013–present

Isabel Gravitt is an American actress. She is best known for playing Ellie Brannock in The Watcher and Tori Cooper in Your Friends & Neighbors.

== Early life ==
Gravitt became interested in acting at age 7 when she was at a local Walmart with her family and she discovered an acting booth. Her parents enrolled her in an acting program to help her overcome her shyness.

== Career ==
She appeared in the coming of age adventure film In Search of Fellini. and was Kaya in the crime horror film Dead Sea. She was Ellie Brannock in the mystery horror series The Watcher. She landed the role late in the casting process and had to move to New York City with her family last minute. Gravitt was next picked as Jon Hamm and Amanda Peet's daughter Tori Cooper in the Apple TV+ drama series Your Friends & Neighbors.

== Filmography ==
=== Film ===
Year	Title	Role	Notes
2013	House Call	Louise	Short
2015	The History of Us	Young Holly	
2017	In Search of Fellini	Ashlee	Young Lucy
2018	Cucuy: The Boogeyman	Sierra	
2022	Witch Mountain	Tia	
2024	Dead Sea	Kaya	

=== Television ===
Year	Title	Role	Notes
2016	Walk the Prank	Lori	Episode; Crushed
2016–2017	American Housewife	Alice McCarthy	5 episodes
2020	Little Fires Everywhere	April Jarvis	4 episodes
2022	The Watcher	Ellie Brannock	7 episodes
2025–present	Your Friends & Neighbors	Tori Cooper	19 episodes
