= The Long Walk (2025 film) =

2025 film by Francis Lawrence

- Theatrical release poster
- Directed by: Francis Lawrence
- Screenplay by: JT Mollner
- Based on: The Long Walk by Stephen King
- Produced by: Roy Lee; Steven Schneider; Francis Lawrence; Cameron MacConomy
- Starring: Cooper Hoffman; David Jonsson; Garrett Wareing; Tut Nyuot; Charlie Plummer; Ben Wang; Roman Griffin Davis; Jordan Gonzalez; Josh Hamilton; Judy Greer; Mark Hamill
- Cinematography: Jo Willems
- Edited by: Mark Yoshikawa
- Music by: Jeremiah Fraites
- Production companies: Vertigo Entertainment; About:Blank
- Distributed by: Lionsgate
- Release date: September 12, 2025
- Running time: 108 minutes
- Country: United States
- Language: English
- Budget: $20 million
- Box office: $63.1 million

The Long Walk is a 2025 American dystopian film directed by Francis Lawrence and written by JT Mollner. It is based on the 1979 novel by Stephen King. The film stars Cooper Hoffman, David Jonsson, Garrett Wareing, Tut Nyuot, Joshua Odjick, Charlie Plummer, Ben Wang, Roman Griffin Davis, Josh Hamilton, Judy Greer, and Mark Hamill.

Set in a dystopian 1970s-style America, the film follows fifty boys in an annual televised competitive walking contest, meant to inspire the country. Each boy must maintain a non-stop walking pace of 3 mph for days, and failure to do so after three warnings results in death. The boy who lasts the longest wins a large cash prize and the fulfilment of one wish of his choice.

The Long Walk was released in the United States by Lionsgate on September 12, 2025. The film received positive reviews from critics, with praise for Lawrence's direction, performances of the cast (particularly Jonsson, Hoffman and Hamill), cinematography, and emotional weight, but criticism for its writing and abrupt ending. It had grossed $63 million on a budget of $20 million.

== Plot ==
In an alternate 20th century, the United States is a totalitarian military regime following a devastating civil war. The regime has established an annual event, the "Long Walk", which aims to inspire patriotism and work ethic among the destitute, as the country is in the grips of a severe economic depression. Fifty teenage boys, one from each state, are chosen randomly from a nationwide pool of candidates, given water and rations, and must walk hundreds of miles nonstop while escorted by armed soldiers who also broadcast the event. Those who fall below 3 miles (4.8 km) per hour or stop walking receive up to three warnings before "receiving their ticket," or being executed. The Walk ends when there is only one survivor remaining, who receives a large cash prize and can have one wish fulfilled. Although the sign-up is technically voluntary, nearly all eligible young men do so every year in the hope of improving their families' lives.

Ray Garraty, the year's participant from Maine, is driven to the starting line near the Canada–United States border by his mother Ginnie, who begs him to back out, even though the deadline to do so has already passed. Ray refuses and meets the other participants, including Peter "Pete" McVries, Billy Stebbins, Arthur "Art" Baker, Collie Parker, Gary Barkovitch, Hank Olson, and Richard Harkness. The Major, a mysterious official who oversees the regime's death squads, starts the Walk and greets the boys from time to time as they proceed southward.

During the first day, Ray gets to know the other walkers and forms a bond with Pete. A boy named Curly is the first to be killed after he develops a charley horse in his leg. Barkovitch is shunned by the group for provoking another walker named Rank Sanders into attacking him, resulting in Rank's execution.

As the Walk continues, Pete says he wants to use his wish to improve the world. Ray wants to wish for a rifle to kill the Major as revenge for his father's execution over political opposition. Pete tries to talk Ray out of it, admits that he cannot let someone die to win, and intends to sit down once he has had enough. More walkers die as the days pass, including Harkness. Hank becomes delirious and tries to attack the soldiers, but they shoot him and let him bleed to death. After learning he was married, the boys vow to send money to his widow. Guilt over causing Rank's death and his exclusion from the pact leads Barkovitch to beg to join. Soon after Ray agrees, Barkovitch has a mental breakdown and fatally stabs himself in the throat with a spoon.

Only Ray, Pete, Stebbins, Art, and Collie remain. While walking through his hometown of Freeport, Ray spots Ginnie and runs to her, apologizing for competing. He is almost killed for stepping off the road, but is saved by Pete. Collie steals a rifle and shoots a soldier, then kills himself after being wounded by the others. Art develops an internal hemorrhage and thanks Pete and Ray for being his friends before stopping. Stebbins, who has fallen ill, reveals to Ray and Pete that he is one of the Major's many illegitimate sons, and he intended to use his wish to be taken into his father's home. He tells the pair it was an honor to walk with them before stopping, leaving Ray and Pete as the final two walkers.

On the rainy evening of the fifth day and after 331 miles (533 km), the pair enter a city in which a large crowd has gathered to see who will win. Pete sits down, but Ray picks him up and encourages him to keep going. He does so only for Ray to stop walking instead. The Major personally executes Ray and congratulates Pete as the winner. When asked to state his wish, Pete carries out Ray's plan by asking for a soldier's carbine and killing the Major with it. He then turns to the now-empty and silent street and walks away.

=== Alternate ending ===
In an alternate ending, Pete chooses to spare the Major's life, then drops the rifle and continues walking, still disillusioned from his wish. A postscript reveals that Hank's widow, Ray's mother, and Art's grandmother begin to receive monthly envelopes filled with cash, and that Art's grandmother also receives his rosary and cross, which he had given to Ray before deciding to stop. It is implied that Pete has been sending them shares of his prize money.

== Cast ==
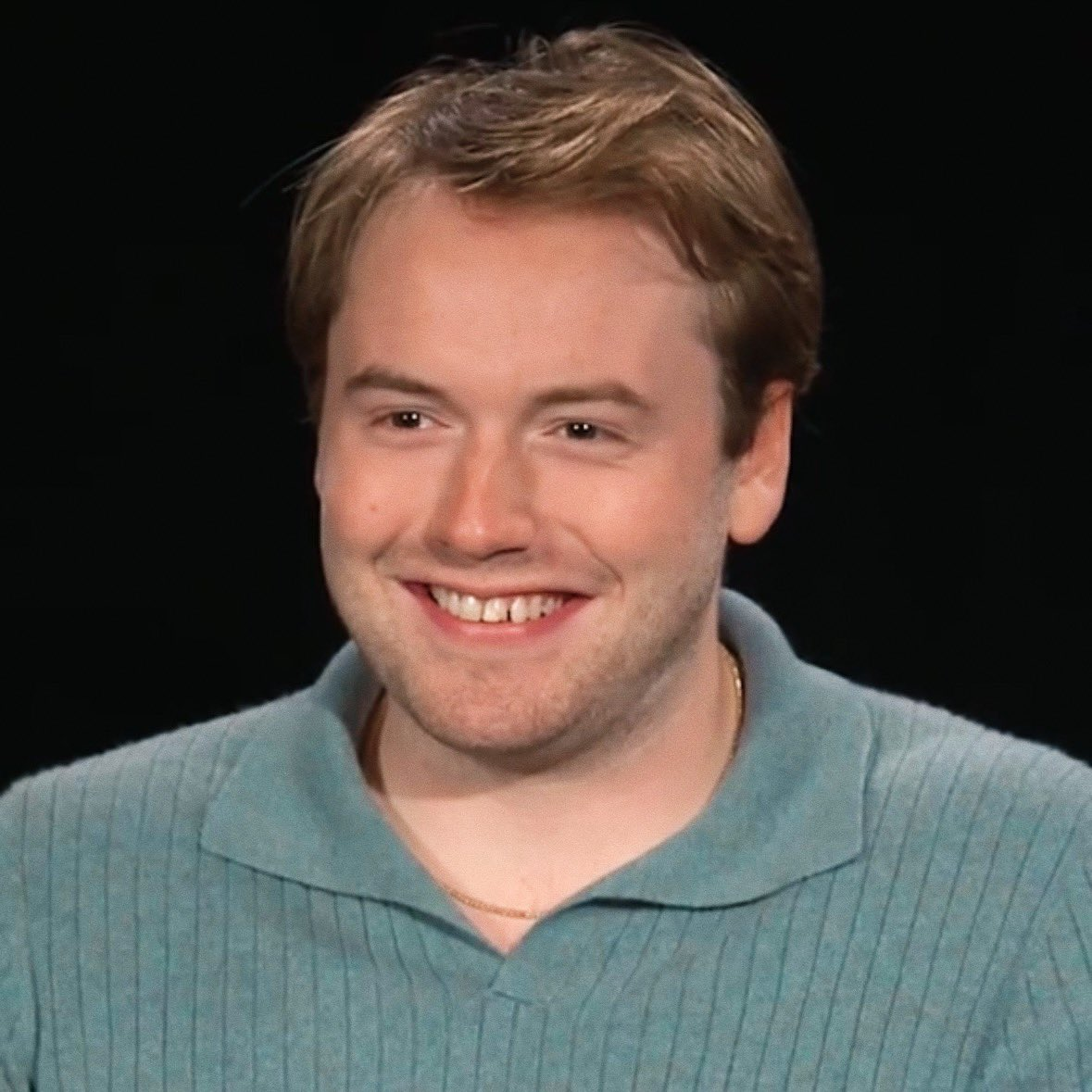
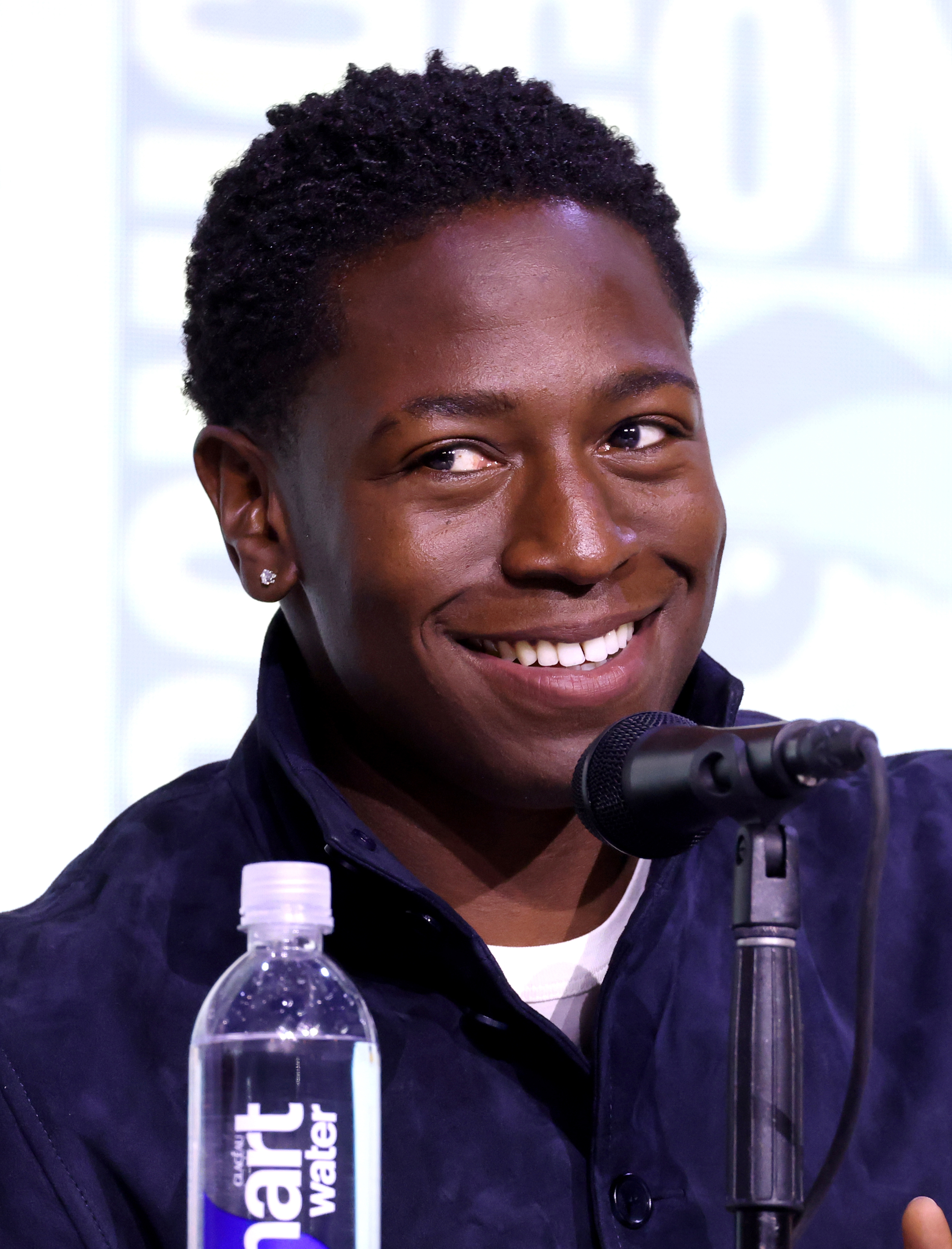
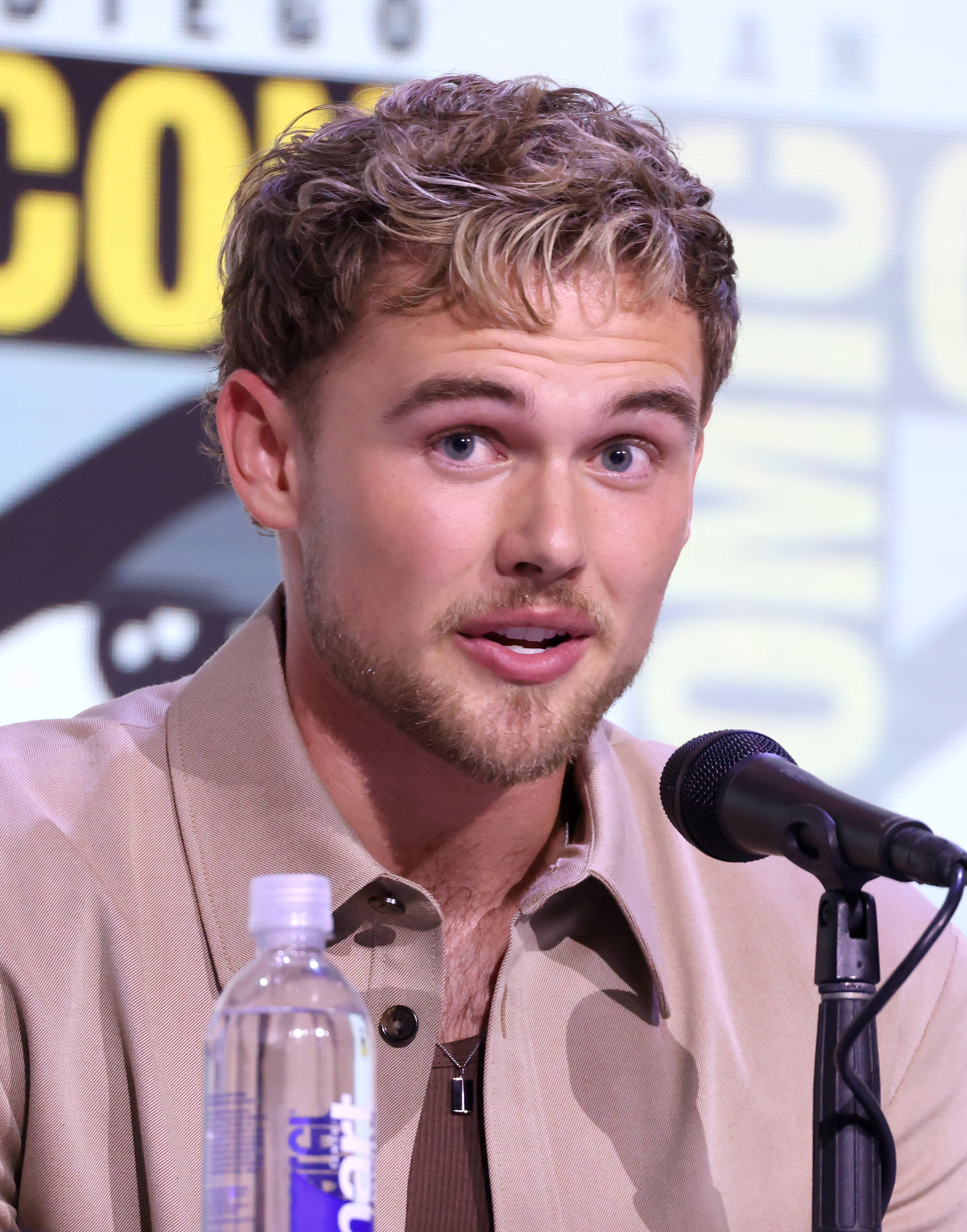
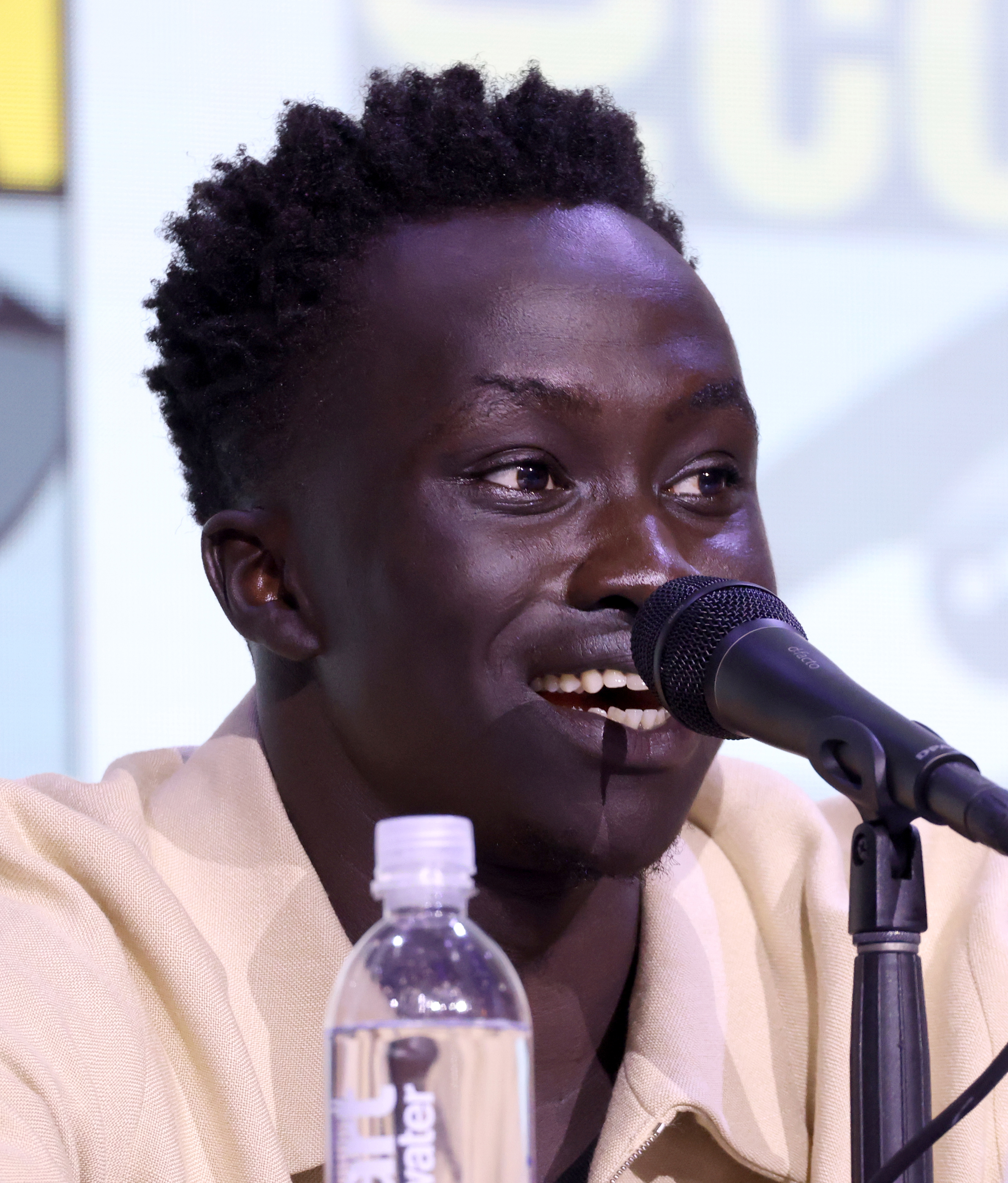
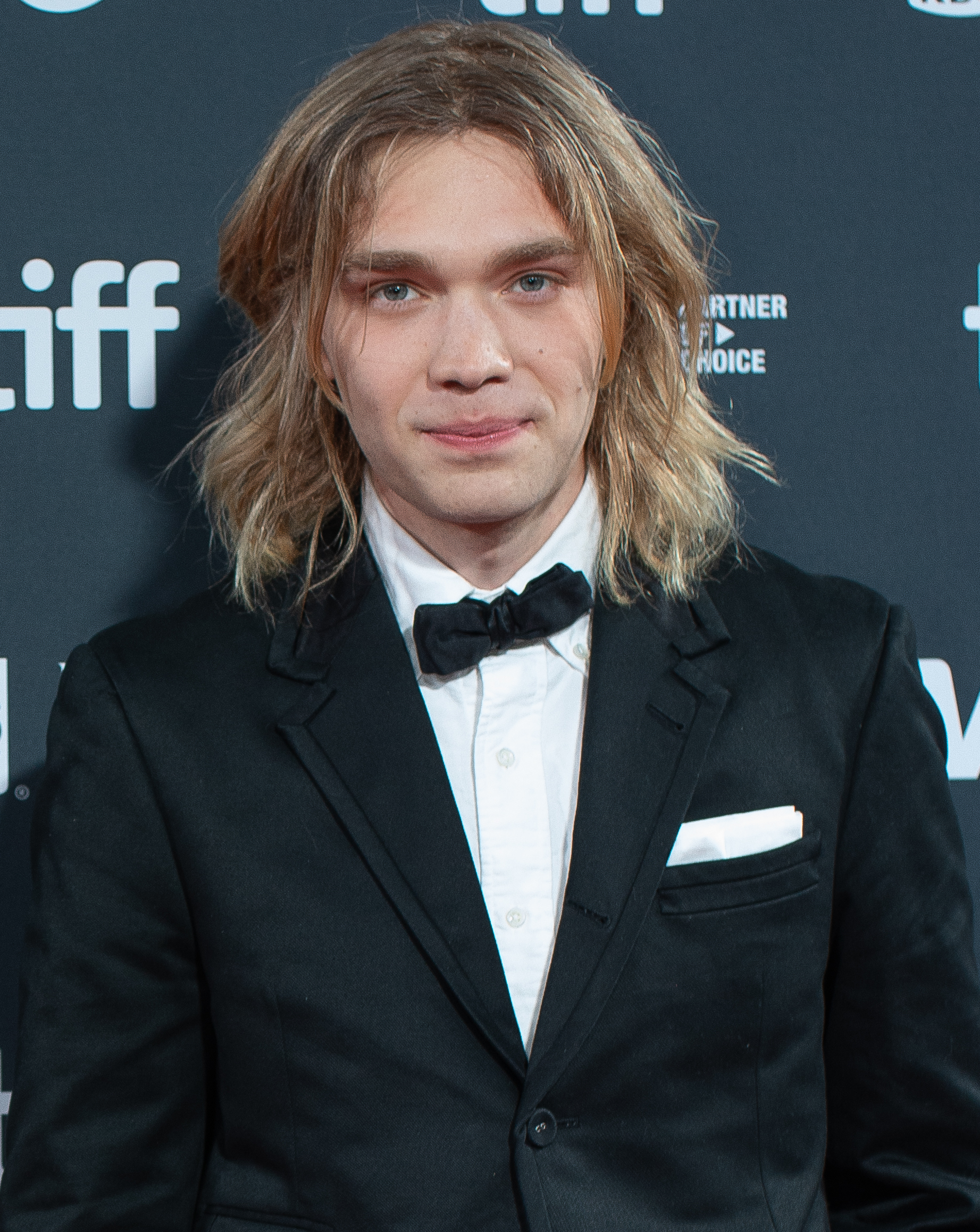
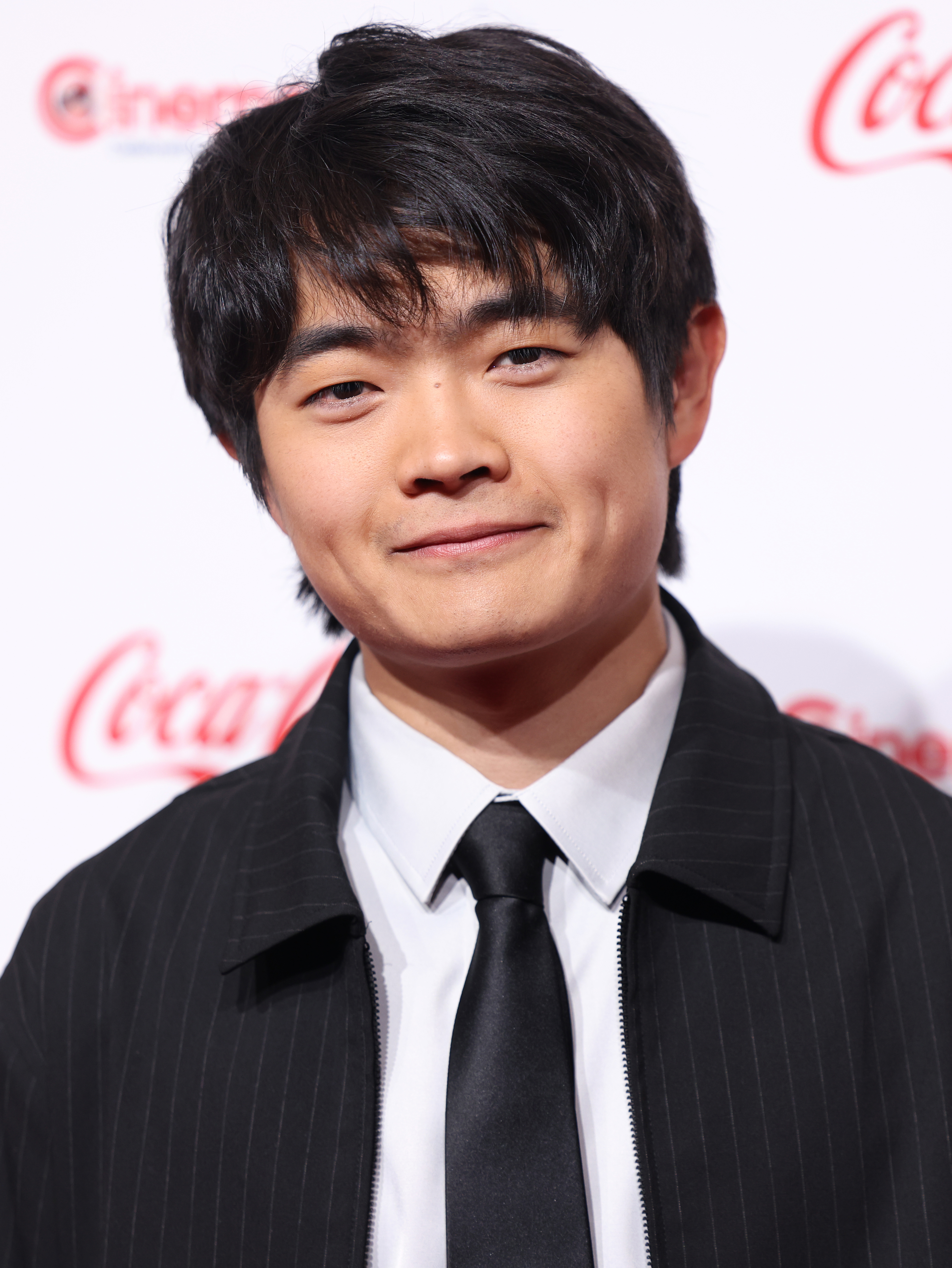
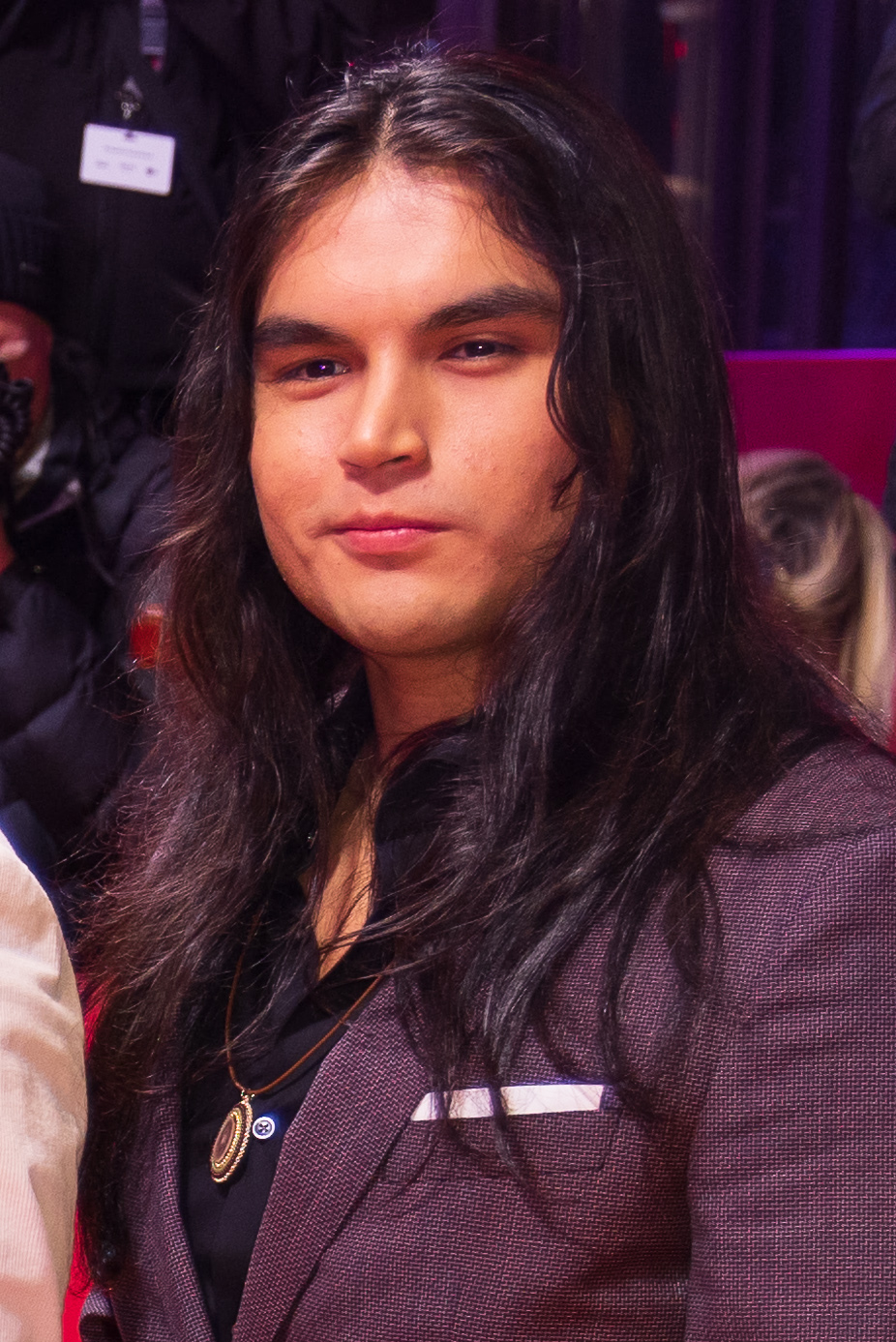
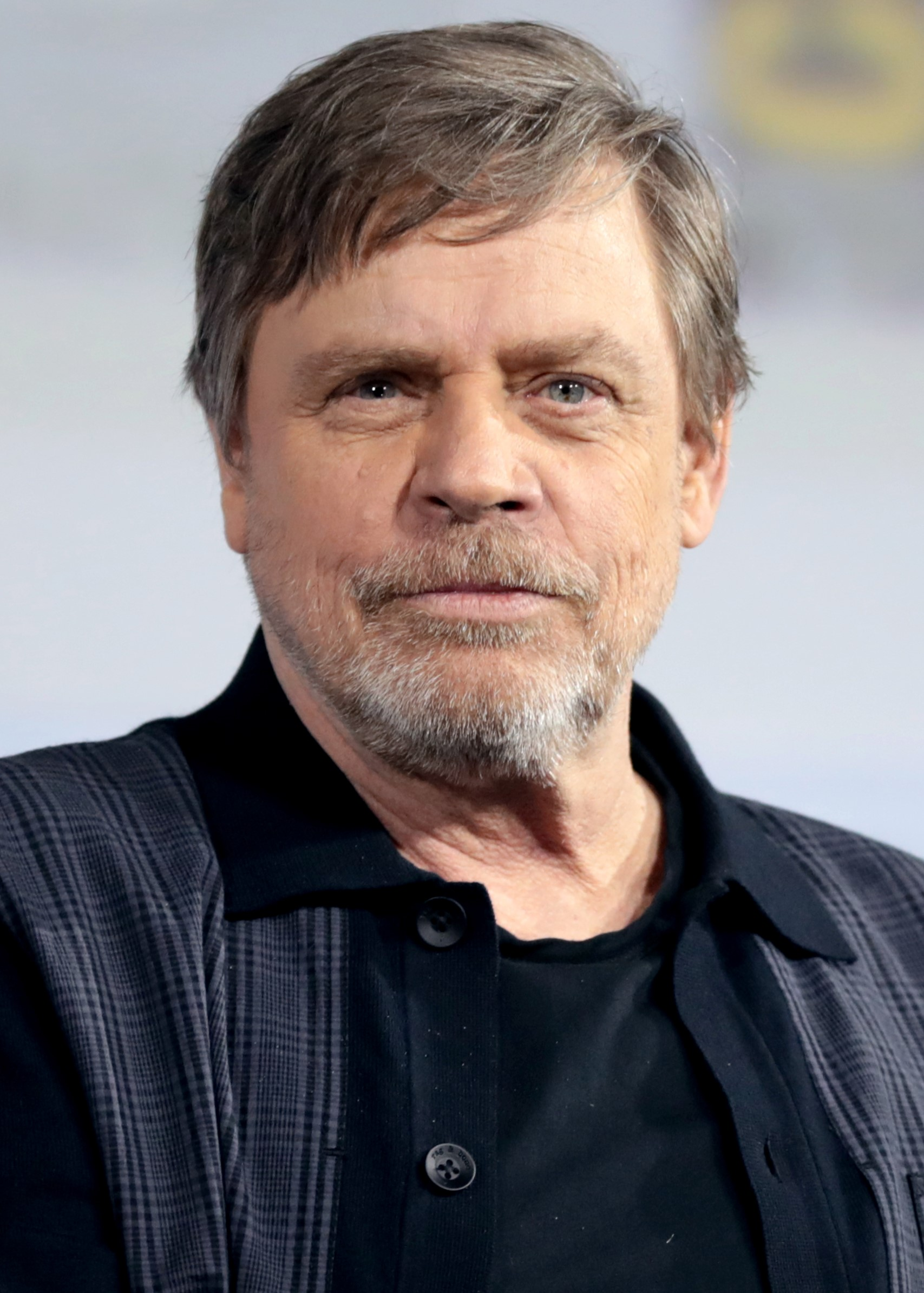
Lead actors Cooper Hoffman and David Jonsson star as Raymond "Ray" Garraty (#47) and Peter "Pete" McVries (#23) respectively, while Garrett Wareing, Tut Nyuot, Charlie Plummer, Ben Wang, Joshua Odjick and Mark Hamill star in supporting roles.
- Cooper Hoffman as Raymond "Ray" Garraty (#47), a walker who aspires to win and exact his revenge against the Major
- David Jonsson as Peter "Pete" McVries (#23), a kind and selfless walker who befriends Ray
- Garrett Wareing as Billy Stebbins (#38), an athletic walker who is knowledgeable about the Long Walk
- Tut Nyuot as Arthur "Art" Baker (#6), a walker who comes from a poor town and hopes to make friends during the walk
- Charlie Plummer as Gary Barkovitch (#5), a walker who taunts the others
- Ben Wang as Hank Olson (#46), a foulmouthed and talkative walker who befriends Art, Ray, and Pete
- Jordan Gonzalez as Richard Harkness (#49), a walker who is writing a book about the Long Walk
- Joshua Odjick as Collie Parker (#48), a walker who comes from a native tribe
- Mark Hamill as the Major, the man in charge of overseeing the Long Walk
- Roman Griffin Davis as Adam "Curly" White (#7), a young walker who appears to have lied about his age to get in
- Judy Greer as Ginnie Garraty, Ray's mother
- Josh Hamilton as William Garraty, Ray's late father
- Noah de Mel as James Ewing (#1), a walker who suffers from seizures
- Daymon Wrightly as Rank Sanders (#19), a walker who Barkovitch bullies
- Jack Giffin as Ronald (#45), a walker who suffers from diarrhea
- Thamela Mpumlwana as Pearson (#8), a walker who points out one of Ray's fans
- Keenan Lehmann as Larson (#14), a walker
- Dale Neri as Percy Grimes (#31), a walker who attempts to escape
- Teagan Stark as Patrick Smith (#4), a walker who is run over by a tank following a plea for help
- Sam Clark as Tressler (#24), a walker with a radio
- Emmanuel Oderemi as Zuck (#50), a walker

== Production ==
In 1988, George A. Romero was considered to direct the film adaptation, but it never came to fruition. By 2007, Frank Darabont had secured the rights to the film adaptation of the novel. He said that he would "get to it one day". He planned to make it low-budget and stated, "It'll be weird, existential and very contained". In April 2018, New Line Cinema was set to adapt a film based on the novel, with James Vanderbilt attached to write and produce the film along with Bradley Fischer and William Sherak through their Mythology Entertainment banner. In May 2019, it was announced that André Øvredal would direct the adaptation.

By November 2023, the film was to be produced by Lionsgate Films in association with Media Capital Technologies, a finance company that was responsible for co-financing the film, with Francis Lawrence directing from a screenplay by JT Mollner. On June 10, 2024, Cooper Hoffman and David Jonsson joined the cast. On taking the part of a young character who lost a father like Hoffman had himself, Hoffman said: "When your trauma is on display for the world, there's no actually hiding it. I'm like, I might as well talk about it, or I might as well put it into something. Because if I keep hiding it and running from it, that's not fair to anyone else who has gone through that. I'm here to display this person and this experience as honestly as I can, and hopefully someone else watches it and goes, he sees me, he understands me. And that's, in my opinion, the only reason to do any sort of art." The next month, Garrett Wareing, Tut Nyuot, Charlie Plummer, Ben Wang, Jordan Gonzalez, Joshua Odjick, Roman Griffin Davis, Mark Hamill, and Judy Greer joined the cast.

Principal photography began on July 24, 2024, in Winnipeg, and wrapped on September 12.

The film was shot largely in chronological order, allowing relationships among the cast to develop over the course of production. The physically demanding shoot required the actors to walk 15 miles each day, with Lawrence estimating that Jonsson and Hoffman covered approximately 350 miles during filming.

Jeremiah Fraites had composed the score for the film by March 2025. The country ballad song "Took a Walk" was written for the film and performed by Shaboozey and Stephen Wilson Jr.

=== Filming ===
Filming took place in or around several Manitoba towns including La Riviere, Saint-Lazare, Marquette, Warren, Stonewall, Garson, Portage La Prairie, and Birds Hill Provincial Park. A portion of the movie was also filmed in Saskatchewan. Significant scenes were shot in Winnipeg's historic Exchange District, including the film's finale.

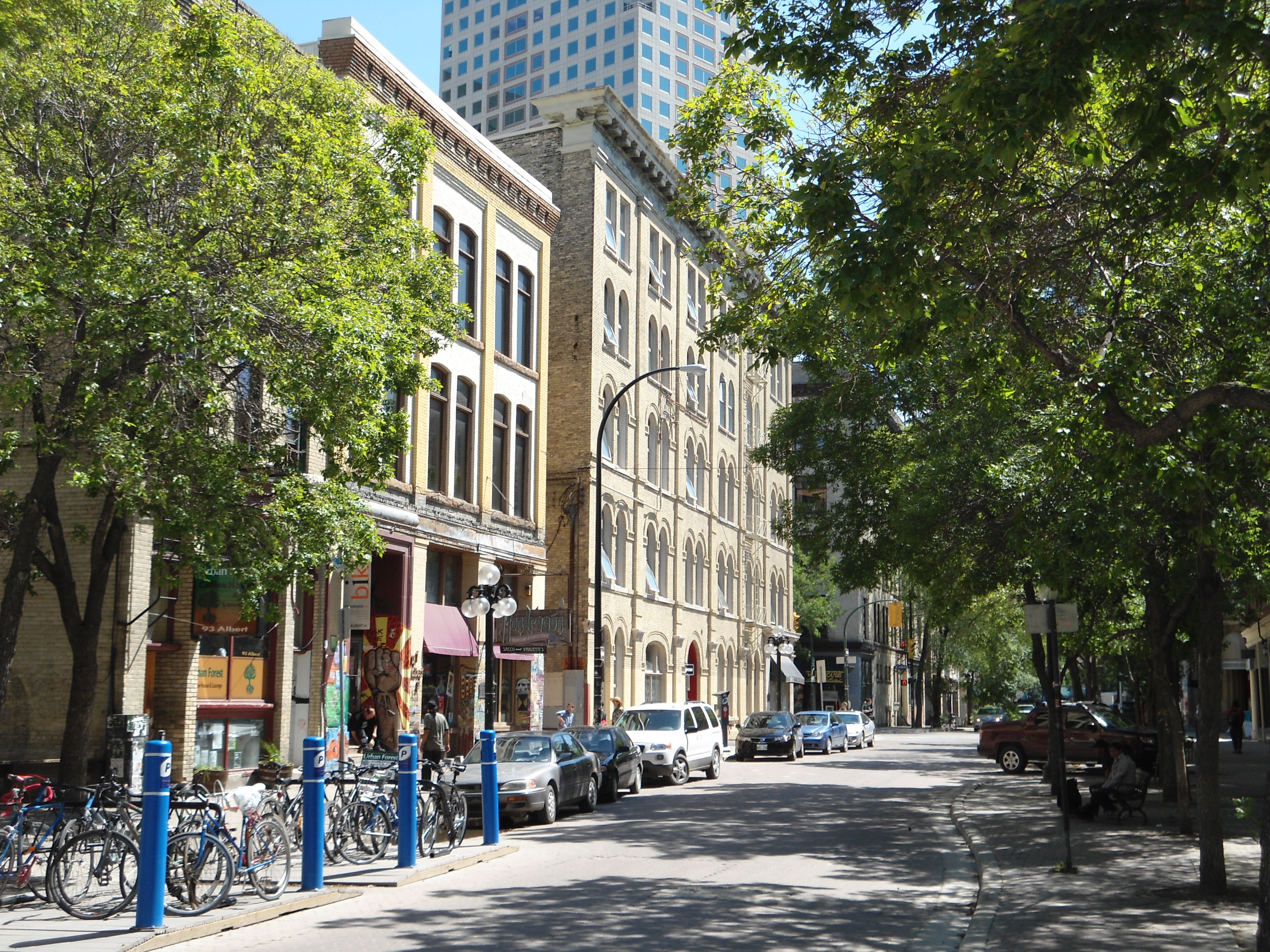
The historic Exchange District where the film's finale was shot.

Many of the roads used for filming ran east–west, allowing the production to make use of natural sunlight throughout the day. The crew used two electric vehicles equipped with cameras to film the actors as they walked, generally shooting with two cameras simultaneously.

== Soundtrack ==
Lionsgate initially approached Shaboozey for permission to use his song "Last of My Kind" in the film’s trailer. After viewing the film, Shaboozey was inspired to create an original song, "Took a Walk", with Stephen Wilson Jr. The song plays over the film’s end credits.

== Release ==
On August 30, 2025, Lionsgate held a promotional screening at the Culver Theater in Los Angeles in which attendees watched the film while walking on treadmills. Participants were required to maintain a speed of at least 3 mph for the duration of the film and were removed from the screening if they fell below the required pace. The Long Walk was released in the United States by Lionsgate on September 12, 2025.

The film closed the 58th Sitges Film Festival on October 19, 2025.

== Reception ==
=== Box office ===
As of December 1, 2025, The Long Walk has grossed $35 million in the United States and Canada, and $28 million in other territories, for a worldwide total of $63 million, against a budget of $20 million.

In the United States and Canada, The Long Walk was released alongside Downton Abbey: The Grand Finale and Demon Slayer: Kimetsu no Yaiba – The Movie: Infinity Castle, and was projected to gross $6–10 million from 2,845 theaters in its opening weekend. The Long Walk made $4.8 million on its first day, including $1.3 million in Thursday previews. It debuted to $11.7 million, finishing in fourth. Positive word of mouth led the film into having above-average holds over the next several weeks. The film dropped out of the box office top ten in its fifth weekend.

Ultimately, the film managed to break-even with producer Roy Lee stating: "It made $65 million on a $20 million budget, so it didn’t lose money. It didn’t blow up, but I feel like it’s going to be similar to the way that The Shawshank Redemption is considered now. The Long Walk is, in a decade or so, going to be considered a classic."

=== Critical response ===
On the review aggregator website Rotten Tomatoes, 88% of 293 critics' reviews are positive, with an average rating of 7.7/10. The website's consensus reads: "Cooper Hoffman and David Jonsson's soulful performances bring a lot of heart to Stephen King's dystopian tale, making The Long Walk a life-or-death ordeal for its characters but a riveting ride for audiences." Metacritic, which uses a weighted average, assigned the film a score of 71 out of 100, based on 34 critics, indicating "generally favorable" reviews. Audiences polled by CinemaScore gave the film an average grade of "B" on an A+ to F scale.

Several reviewers praised the film for its performances, emotional impact, and cinematography. Clint Worthington of RogerEbert.com awarded the film 3 out of 4 stars, giving attention to the acting and the dynamics between characters. In Variety, Siddhant Adlakha praised the actors for creating characters that appeared "well-rounded and fully formed", which compensated for the vagueness of the world they inhabit. Nick Schager of The Daily Beast wrote that the cinematography imbued the film with a "stark, morose beauty". Writing for Slate, Rebecca Onion described the film adaptation as better than the source material: "Stephen King has been adapted a lot, but this is the leanest, meanest adaptation of his work in a long time."

The film also received criticism for what some reviewers perceived as a thinly drawn premise and minimalistic approach to character development, including from Steve Rose of The Guardian. Rose noted that the script left many blanks, writing: "It is left to the viewer to fill in the gaps, suppress their niggling questions and just go along with it." In The Washington Post, Michael O'Sullivan observed: "How the contest is intended to restore what is described as the struggling American economy — let alone give viewers a sense of hope, as the overseer of the walk, identified only as the Major (a cartoonish Mark Hamill), declares — is a mystery." Jeannette Catsoulis of The New York Times also found that the plot strained credulity and that the director "forgot to entertain the audience".

Some also criticized the film's cryptic ending, similar to the book's ambiguous ending. Polygon's Tasha Robinson wrote: "But for me at least, DeVries [sic] being allowed to kill The Major and then walk away doesn't feel possible, and doesn't feel plausible – not without some sense of why that might happen. Nothing in the movie up to that moment sets up the idea that The Major's most devoted killers wouldn't respond in some way to his death, or that a crowd primed to shriek with excitement and enthusiasm over the graphic murder of teenage boys would stand by silently when their world changes in front of them. I don't think what we’re seeing is real. Whether that's a satisfying landing for this story, well, that's even more up to individual interpretation than the facts of the ending itself." Mashable's Belen Edwards was more positive, writing: "Like Garraty in the novel, perhaps McVries is so traumatized that he imagines that he keeps walking on. Or perhaps, on a much darker note, soldiers opened fire on McVries as soon as he killed the Major, and his final walk into the rain is him walking into death."

=== Accolades ===
Award	Date of ceremony	Category	Nominee(s)	Result	Ref.
Astra Creative Arts Awards	December 11, 2025	Best Sound	Jeremy Peirson, Thomas Jones, Jeffrey Murias, Jeremy Peirson, and Carlos Sanches	Nominated	
Astra Creative Arts Awards	December 11, 2025	Best Second Unit Director	Hadie DeJesus	Nominated	
Astra Creative Arts Awards	December 11, 2025	Best Marketing Campaign	The Long Walk	Nominated	
Astra Film Awards	January 9, 2026	Best Book to Screen Adaptation	The Long Walk	Nominated	
Astra Film Awards	January 9, 2026	Best Supporting Actor – Drama	David Jonsson	Nominated	
Austin Film Critics Association	December 18, 2025	Best Supporting Actor	David Jonsson	Nominated	
Austin Film Critics Association	December 18, 2025	Best Ensemble	The Long Walk	Nominated	
Film Independent Spirit Awards	February 15, 2026	Robert Altman Award	Francis Lawrence, Rich Delia, Judy Greer, Mark Hamill, Cooper Hoffman, David Jonsson, Tut Nyuot, Joshua Odjick, Charlie Plummer, Ben Wang, and Garrett Wareing	Won	
Florida Film Critics Circle	December 19, 2025	Best Supporting Actor	David Jonsson	Runner-up	
London Film Critics Circle	February 1, 2026	British/Irish Performer of the Year	David Jonsson	Nominated	
Phoenix Film Critics Society	December 15, 2025	Top Ten Films	The Long Walk	Won	
Saturn Awards	March 8, 2026	Best Thriller Movie	The Long Walk	Nominated	
Seattle Film Critics Society	December 15, 2025	Best Actor in a Supporting Role	David Jonsson	Nominated	
