= Amanda Fix =

Canadian actress

- Born: November 5, 2001 (age 25); Vancouver, British Columbia, Canada
- Occupation: Actress
- Years active: 2021–present

Amanda Fix (born 2001)is a Canadian actress.

== Early life ==
Fix was born in Vancouver.

== Career ==
Fix made her feature film debut appearing in Broken Diamonds (2021). Fix played in Kung Fu (2021), North of Normal (2022), High School (2022), Daisy Jones & the Six (2023), Orphan Black: Echoes (2023), and Lowlifes (2024).

In July 2026, Fix was announced to play a young Lorraine Warren in The Conjuring: First Communion (2027), a prequel to The Conjuring (2013).

== Filmography ==
=== Film ===
- Broken Diamonds (2021, as Young Cindy)
- North of Normal (2022, as Cea Sunrise Person)
- Lowlifes (2024, as Amy)
- Teenage Sex and Death at Camp Miasma (2026, as young Billy Presley)
- The Conjuring: First Communion (2027, as young Lorraine Warren)

=== Television ===
- Kung Fu (2021, "Silence" S1E2, as Ronda)
- High School (2022, 8 episodes, as Maya)
- Orphan Black: Echoes (2023, 10 episodes, as Jules Lee)
- Something Very Bad Is Going to Happen (2026, as Benjamin)
