= Cooper Hoffman =

American actor (born 2003)

- Cooper Hoffman at the 2026 New York Film Festival
- Born: Cooper Alexander Hoffman; March 20, 2003 (age 23); New York City, New York, U.S.
- Occupation: Actor
- Years active: 2021–present
- Father: Philip Seymour Hoffman
- Relatives: Gordy Hoffman (uncle)

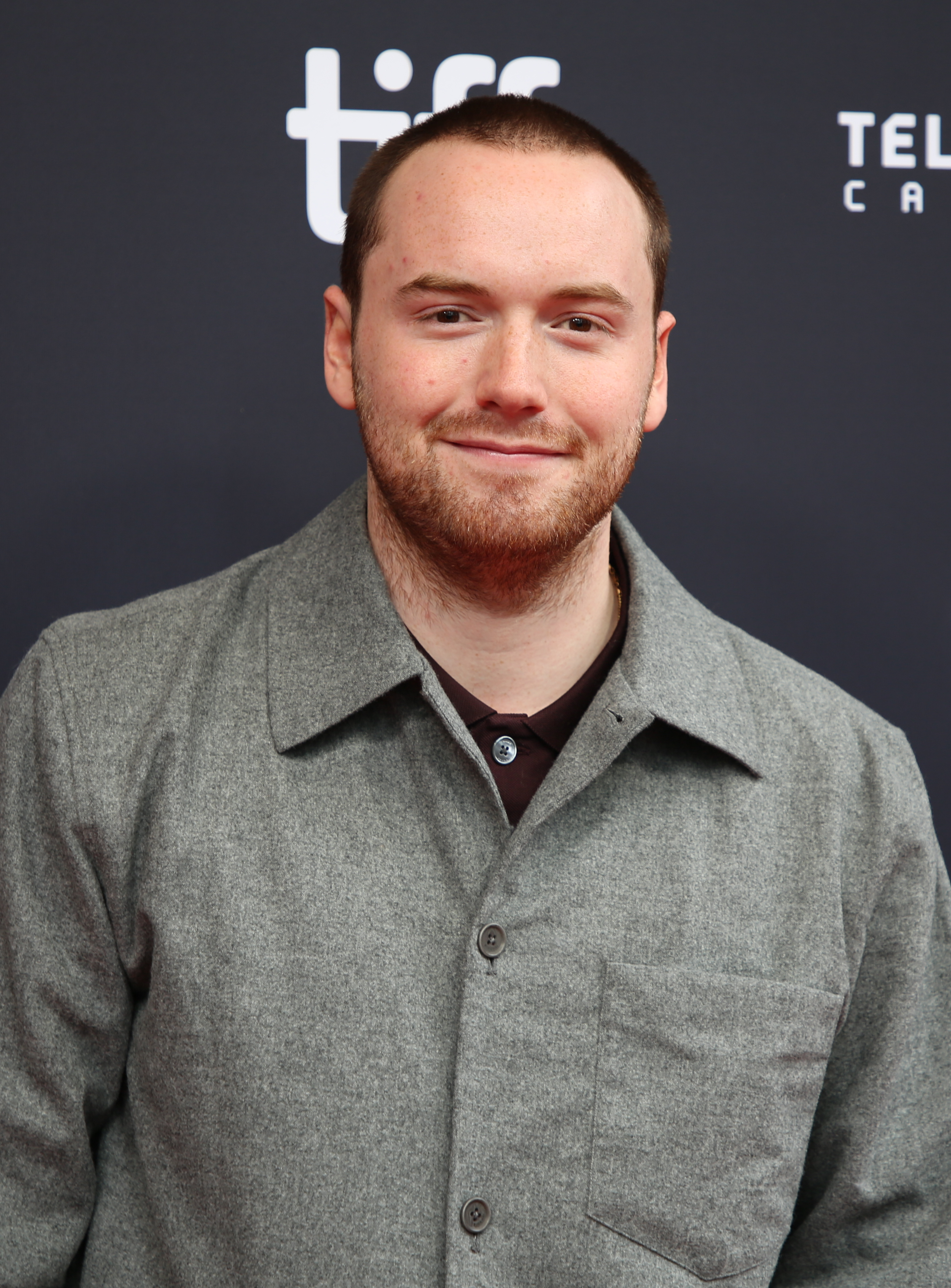
Hoffman in 2025 at TIFF.

Cooper Alexander Hoffman (born March 20, 2003) is an American actor. He made his acting debut with a leading role in Paul Thomas Anderson's coming-of-age film Licorice Pizza (2021), for which he was nominated for a Golden Globe Award. He has since portrayed Dick Ebersol in the comedy-drama Saturday Night (2024) and played the lead role in The Long Walk (2025), adapted from Stephen King's 1979 novel. He made his stage debut in an Off-Broadway production of Sam Shepard's tragedy play Curse of the Starving Class (2025).

== Early life ==
Born on March 20, 2003, Hoffman is the son of actor Philip Seymour Hoffman and costume designer Mimi O'Donnell. He has two younger sisters. His father died when he was 10 years old.

Growing up, Hoffman did not seriously consider becoming an actor. His only involvement in school plays was as part of the stage crew but he did participate in making short films with his friends, including the director Paul Thomas Anderson, a family friend, and Anderson's son, Jack.

== Career ==
Hoffman made his film debut in Licorice Pizza (2021), written and directed by Paul Thomas Anderson, a frequent collaborator of his father's. Hoffman's performance received critical acclaim and was nominated for, among other awards, the Golden Globe Award for Best Actor – Motion Picture Musical or Comedy.

In 2023, he acted in the Flannery O'Connor biopic Wildcat, directed by Ethan Hawke. The film premiered at the 50th Telluride Film Festival in Telluride, Colorado. In 2024, Hoffman played Dick Ebersol in the biographical comedy-drama Saturday Night. The film's director was Jason Reitman.

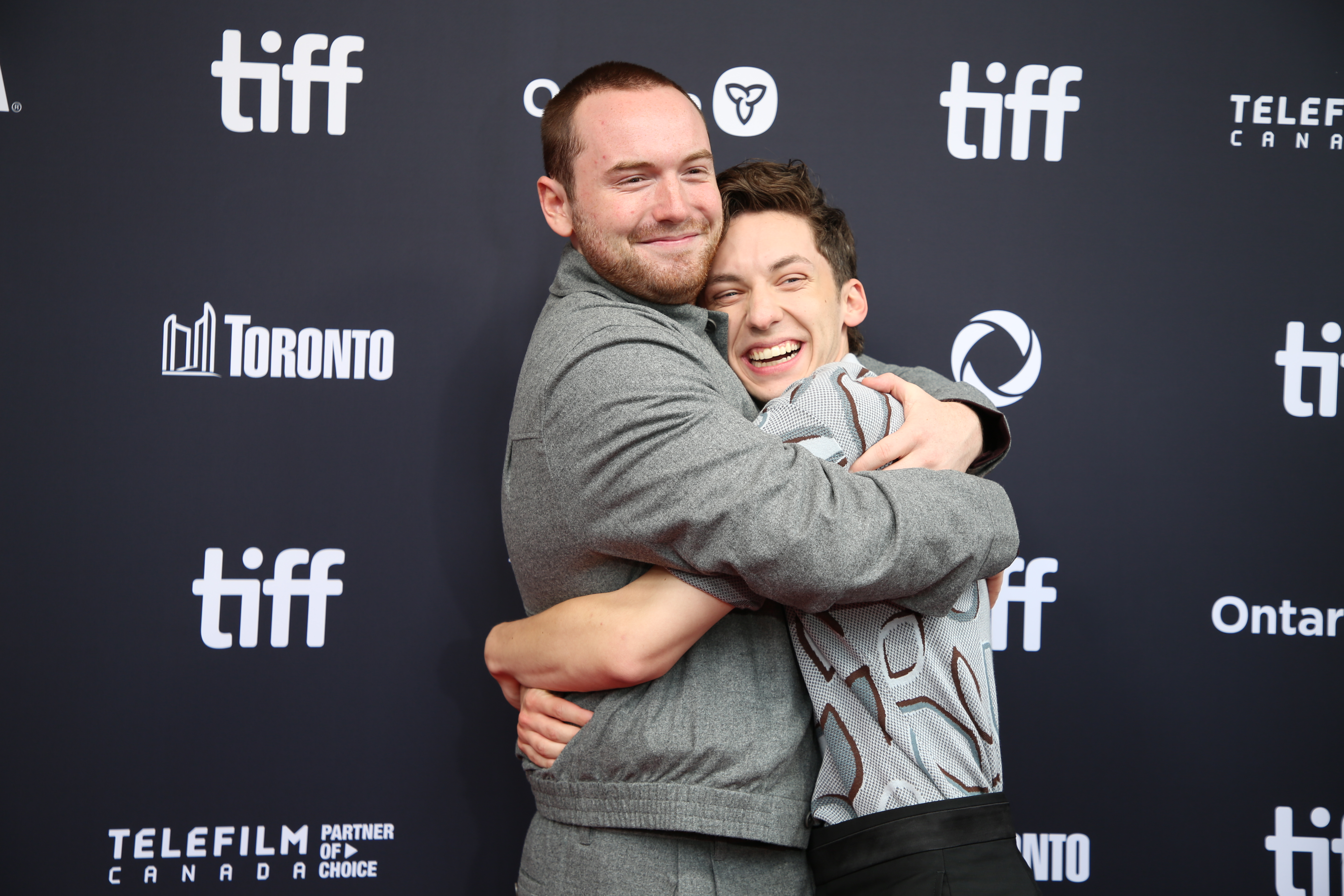
Hoffman with his Poetic License co-star Andrew Barth Feldman at TIFF 2025

In 2025, Hoffman starred in The Long Walk based on the 1979 novel by Stephen King and directed by Francis Lawrence.

Hoffman related his character's grief over the loss of his father to his own experience. Hoffman said: "When your trauma is on display for the world, there's no actually hiding it... I might as well talk about it or I might as well put it into something. Because if I keep hiding it and running from it, that’s not fair to anyone else who has gone through that... hopefully someone else watches it and goes, He sees me, he understands me and that's, in my opinion, the only reason to do any sort of art."

In 2025, Hoffman starred as Ari Zimmer in Maude Apatow’s feature directorial debut, Poetic License, alongside Andrew Barth Feldman and Leslie Mann.

In 2026, Hoffman starred as Elliot in Gregg Araki's erotic thriller, I Want Your Sex.

In June 2026, it was announced Hoffman would star in Hulu's drama pilot Durango.

== Personal life ==
Hoffman is currently in a relationship with his Poetic License co-star Nico Parker. The two met while filming the movie and reportedly fell in love. Several weeks after filming ended, Parker visited Hoffman in New York, where she met Hoffman's mother Mimi O'Donnell, and Hoffman asked Parker to be his girlfriend.

== Acting credits ==
=== Film ===
Year	Title	Role	Notes
2021	Licorice Pizza	Gary Valentine	
2023	Wildcat	Manley Pointer	
2024	Old Guy	Wihlborg	
2024	Saturday Night	Dick Ebersol	
2025	The Long Walk	Ray Garraty	
2025	Poetic License	Ari Zimmer	
2026	I Want Your Sex	Elliot	
2026	Artificial	Greg Brockman	Completed
2027	The Chaperones		Post-production

=== Theater ===
Year	Title	Role	Venue	Ref.
2025	Curse of the Starving Class	Wesley Tate	The New Group, Off-Broadway	

== Awards and nominations ==
Year	Award	Category	Work	Result	Ref.
2021	National Board of Review Awards	Breakthrough Performance	Licorice Pizza	Won	
2021	Florida Film Critics Circle	Pauline Kael Breakout Award	Licorice Pizza	Won	
2022	Alliance of Women Film Journalists	Most Egregious Age Difference Between the Leading Man and the Love Interest	Licorice Pizza	Nominated	
2022	Critics' Choice Movie Awards	Best Young Performer	Licorice Pizza	Nominated	
2022	Georgia Film Critics Association	Breakthrough Award	Licorice Pizza	Nominated	
2022	Golden Globe Awards	Best Actor in a Motion Picture – Musical or Comedy	Licorice Pizza	Nominated	
2022	Online Film & Television Association	Best Youth Performance	Licorice Pizza	Nominated	
2022	Seattle Film Critics Society	Best Youth Pefromance	Licorice Pizza	Nominated	
2025	Independent Spirit Awards	Robert Altman Award	The Long Walk	Won	
