= Tut Nyuot =

British actor (born 2004)

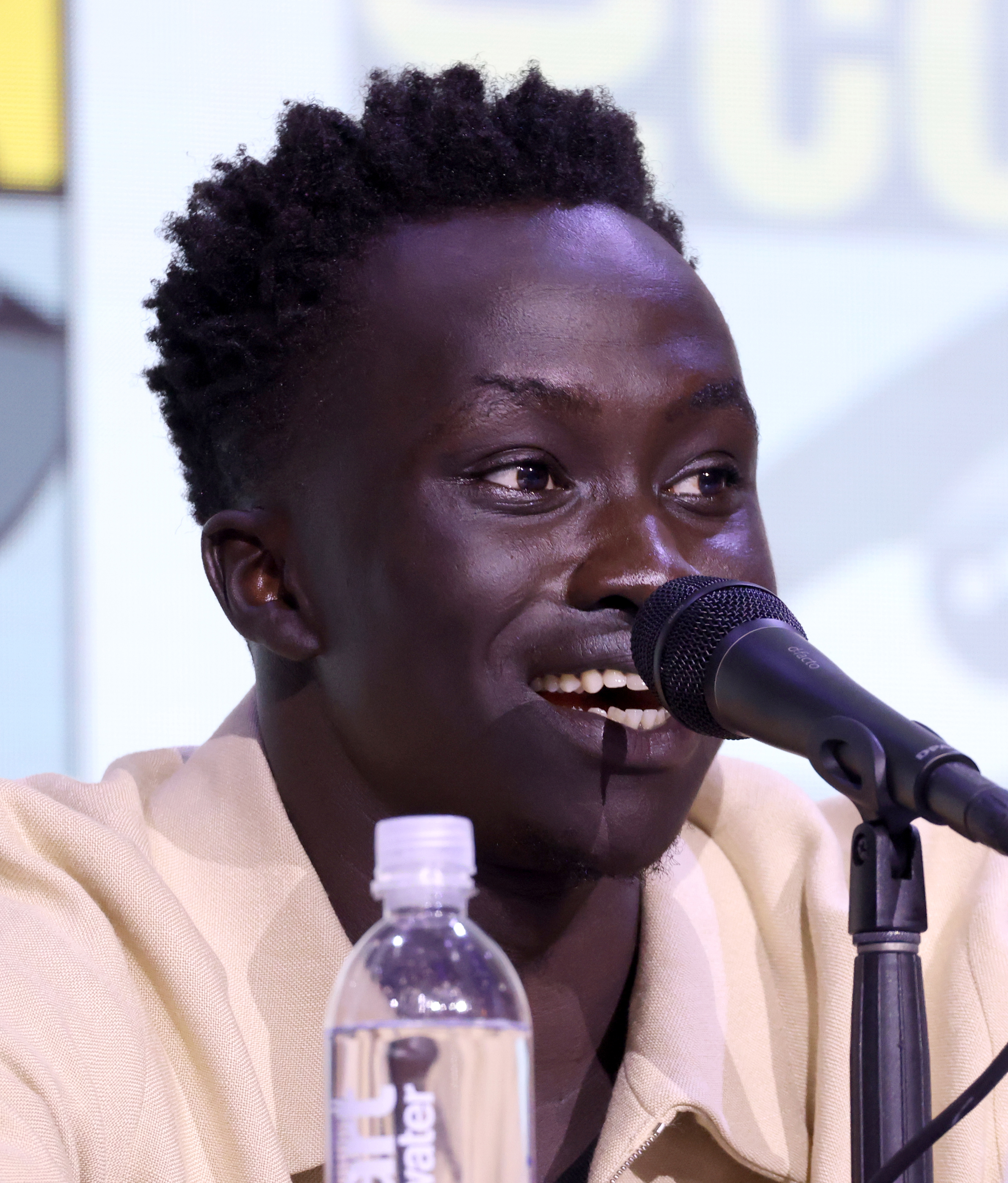
- Nyuot in 2025
- Born: 21 July 2004 (age 22); London, England
- Occupation: Actor
- Years active: 2017–present

Tut Nyuot (born 21 July 2004) is a British actor. He has appeared on television in series such as The Dumping Ground and Hetty Feather and in film as Arthur Baker in The Long Walk.

== Career ==
Nyuot's earliest screen credits include appearances in the BBC series Dark Money and the CBBC series The Dumping Ground. He later appeared in Netflix projects, including the fantasy prequel series The Witcher: Blood Origin (2022).

In 2025, Nyuot starred in Francis Lawrence's adaptation of Stephen King's The Long Walk.

Nyuot is set to feature as a lead role in Ashley Walters' directorial debut Animol. Nyuot appeared alongside Cillian Murphy in the drama film Steve.

== Personal life ==
Nyuot is of South Sudanese descent.

== Filmography ==
=== Film ===
Year	Title	Role	Notes
2025	The Long Walk	Arthur Baker	
2025	Steve	Tarone	
2026	Animol	Troy	
TBA	Bare †	TBA	Filming

=== Television ===
Year	Title	Role	Notes
2017	Hetty Feather	Kitt	4 episodes
2017	Casualty	Sanosi Jemal	7 episode
2019	Dark Money	Tyrone Stevens-Mensah	4 episodes
2020	The Dumping Ground	Nazeer	5 episodes
2020	Small Axe	Abraham	1 episode
2021	Sliced	—	1 episode
2022	The Witcher: Blood Origin	Shen	1 episode
