= David Jonsson =

British actor (born 1993)

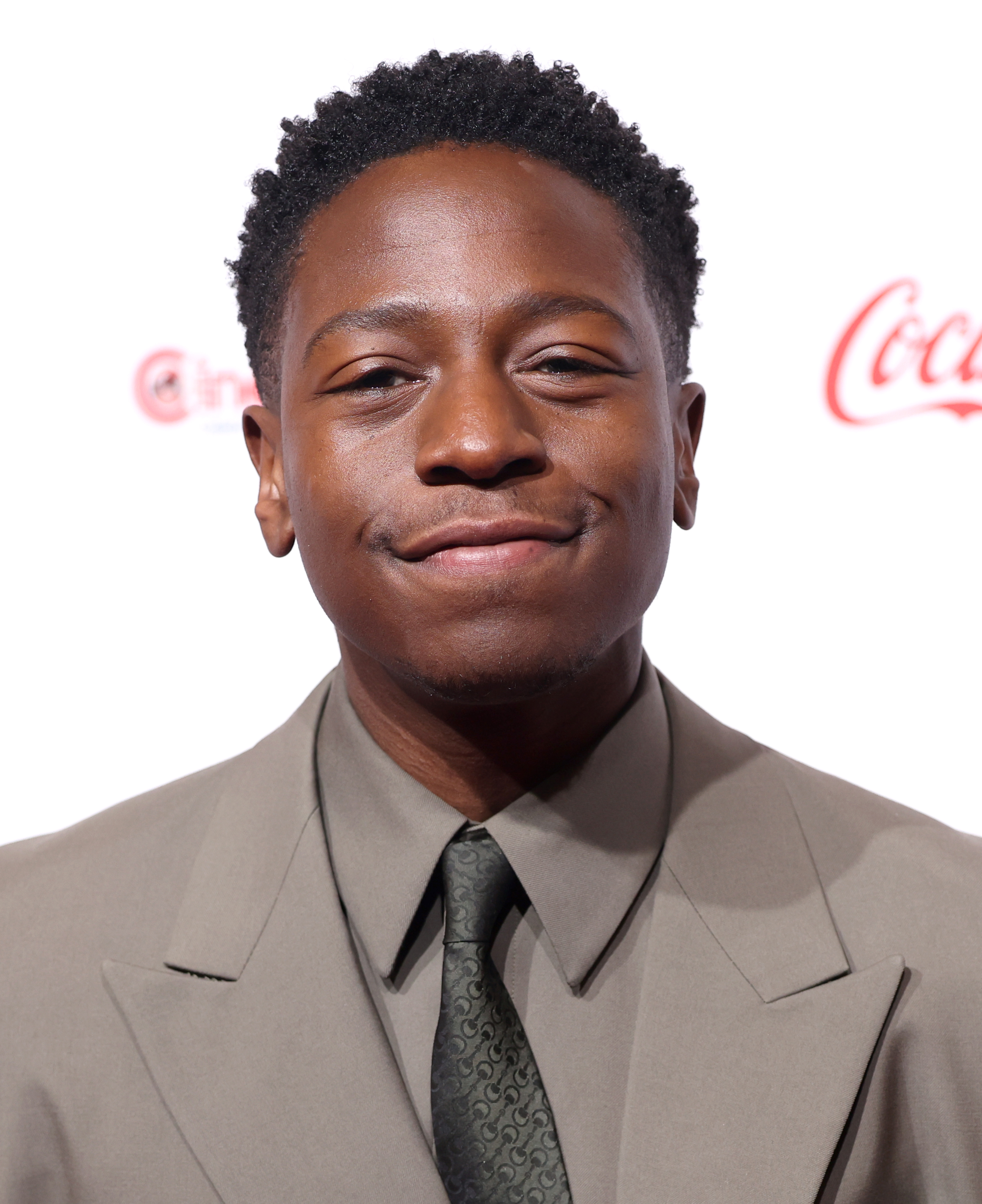
- Jonsson in 2025
- Born: 4 September 1993 (age 33); London, England
- Other name: David Jonsson-Fray
- Education: Royal Academy of Dramatic Art (BA)
- Occupation: Actor
- Years active: 2016–present
- Awards: See below

David Jonsson (born 4 September 1993) is a British actor. He began his career on the West End, winning a Black British Theatre Award for his performance in the play and breathe... (2021). He is known for his performance in the BBC Two and HBO television series Industry (2020–2022), as well as his roles in the films Rye Lane (2023), Alien: Romulus (2024), and The Long Walk (2025).

In 2022, Jonsson appeared on the Evening Standard list of Londoners to watch and was one of British GQ's Men of the Year Honourees. He was named a 2023 Bright Young Thing by Tatler and a Screen International Star of Tomorrow. In 2025, he won the BAFTA Rising Star Award and was nominated at the British Independent Film Awards in the Best Lead Performance category for his role in the film Wasteman (2025). In 2026, At San Diego Comic-Con, Jonsson was announced as the next actor to portray Black Panther in the Marvel Cinematic Universe, after the passing of Chadwick Boseman in 2020.

== Early life and education ==
Jonsson was born in London to parents of Nigerian and Sierra Leonean descent. He grew up in Custom House, an area of the East London Docklands. His father was an IT engineer at Heathrow Airport and his mother worked for the Metropolitan Police. Jonsson is the youngest of four, with an older brother and two older sisters.

After getting in trouble at and dismissed from school, Jonsson transferred to a school in Hammersmith. He told his mother he wanted to be an actor. After completing his GCSEs, Jonsson spent two years in New York City. Upon returning to London at the age of 18, he joined the National Youth Theatre and won a scholarship to study at the Royal Academy of Dramatic Art (RADA), graduating with a Bachelor of Arts in Acting in 2016.

== Career ==
Upon graduating from the Royal Academy of Dramatic Art (RADA), Jonsson was cast in his professional stage debut as William Davison in the play Mary Stuart at the Almeida Theatre. The production transferred to Duke of York's Theatre in early 2017, marking Jonsson's West End debut. That same year, he appeared on the West End again, this time in Don Juan in Soho alongside David Tennant at Wyndham's Theatre.

In 2018, Jonsson made his television debut in two episodes of the ITV detective drama Endeavour. He wrote, directed, and starred in a short film titled Gen Y. The following year, he played the recurring character Isaac Turner in the second series of the Fox UK espionage thriller Deep State.

Jonsson starred as Augustus "Gus" Sackey in the first two series of the BBC Two and HBO investment banking drama Industry from 2020 to 2022. To prepare for the role, he visited the character's alma maters Eton College and University of Oxford to familiarise himself with such a different background from his own.

In 2021, Jonsson won an award at the Black British Theatre Awards for his performance in and breathe... at the Almeida Theatre, and presented the Jean-Michel Basquiat episode of Great Lives for BBC Radio 4.

Jonsson made his feature film debut opposite Vivian Oparah in the romantic comedy Rye Lane, which opened at the 2023 Sundance Film Festival to critical acclaim. He also played the lead character Luke Fitzwilliam in the BBC's 2023 adaptation of Agatha Christie's Murder Is Easy.

In 2023, Jonsson was cast in Alien: Romulus as the synthetic Andy, which released in 2024, that led to him winning the 2025 BAFTA Rising Star Award. He is expected to return as Andy in the sequel. Later in 2024 he was cast as Pete McVries in The Long Walk, which released in 2025 to positive reviews, with specific praise for his performance. Jonsson was also praised for his role in the film Wasteman (2025), where he was nominated for Best Lead Performance at the 2025 British Independent Film Awards.

Jonsson is developing his first television script Hype with Clerkenwell Films. In addition, he has roles in the upcoming films Benn/Eubank and Scandalous!.

In 2026, It was announced at San Diego Comic-Con that Jonsson will portray T'Challa II / Toussaint / Black Panther in the Marvel Cinematic Universe film Black Panther III, scheduled to be released on 15 December 2028.

== Filmography ==
Key
†	Denotes titles that have not yet been released

=== Film ===
Year	Title	Role	Notes
2018	Gen Y	Troy	Short film
2023	Pray	Christopher	Short film
2023	Rye Lane	Dom	
2024	Meat Puppet	Oz	Short film
2024	Alien: Romulus	Andy Carradine	
2024	Bonhoeffer	Frank Fisher	
2025	James Hyde - The Very Thought of You	Warrant Officer James Hyde	Short film
2025	The Long Walk	Peter "Pete" McVries	
2025	Wasteman	Taylor	Also executive producer
2027	The Chaperones †		Post-production

=== Television ===
Year	Title	Role	Notes
2018	Endeavour	Cromwell Ames	Episodes: "Quartet" and "Icarus"
2019	Deep State	Isaac Turner	Recurring role; series 2
2020–2022	Industry	Augustus "Gus" Sackey	Main role
2023	Murder Is Easy	Luke Fitzwilliam	Miniseries
2024	The Road Trip	Marcus	Main role
2025	Too Much	Oriel Terrabianco	Episode: "One Wedding and a Sex Pest"

=== Audio drama ===
Year	Title	Voice role	Notes
2017	UNIT: The New Series	Cpl. James Morley	Episode: "Invocation"

== Stage credits ==
Year	Title	Role	Venue	Notes
2016–2017	Mary Stuart	William Davison	Almeida Theatre, London	
2016–2017	Mary Stuart	William Davison	Duke of York's Theatre, London	
2017	Don Juan in Soho	Col	Wyndham's Theatre, London	
2020	“Daddy”: A Melodrama	Franklin	Almeida Theatre, London	Rehearsals only
2021	and breathe...	Junior	Almeida Theatre, London	

== Awards and nominations ==
Award	Year	Category	Work	Result	Ref.
Astra Film Awards	2026	Best Supporting Actor – Drama	The Long Walk	Nominated	
Austin Film Critics Association	2025	Best Supporting Actor	The Long Walk	Nominated	
British Academy Film Award	2025	Rising Star Award	Alien: Romulus	Won	
Black British Theatre Award	2022	Best Male Actor in a Play	and breathe...	Won	
British Independent Film Award	2023	Best Joint Lead Performance (with Vivian Oparah)	Rye Lane	Nominated	
British Independent Film Award	2025	Best Lead Performance	Wasteman	Nominated	
Critics' Choice Super Awards	2025	Best Actor in a Science Fiction/Fantasy Movie	Alien: Romulus	Nominated	
Critics' Choice Super Awards	2026	Best Actor in a Horror Movie	The Long Walk	Nominated	
Film Independent Spirit Awards	2026	Robert Altman Award	The Long Walk	Won	
Florida Film Critics Circle	2025	Best Supporting Actor	The Long Walk	Runner-up	
London Film Critics Circle	2026	British/Irish Performer of the Year	The Long Walk	Nominated	
Saturn Awards	2025	Best Supporting Actor	Alien: Romulus	Nominated	
Seattle Film Critics Society	2025	Best Actor in a Supporting Role	The Long Walk	Nominated	
