= List of Stuck in the Middle episodes =

Stuck in the Middle is an American family comedy television series developed by Alison Brown and Linda Videtti Figueiredo and created by Alison Brown that premiered on Disney Channel on February 14, 2016. The series focuses on Jenna Ortega as Harley Diaz, who invents many gadgets to deal with living in a large family. In addition to the regular episodes, the series also aired six shorts on December 16, 2016. After three seasons and 57 episodes, the series concluded with the episode "Stuck in Harley's Quinceañera" on July 23, 2018.

== Series overview ==
Season	Episodes	Originally released	
Season	Episodes	First released	Last released
1	17	February 14, 2016	July 22, 2016
2	20	February 3, 2017	October 27, 2017
3	20	December 8, 2017	July 23, 2018

== Episodes ==
=== Season 1 (2016) ===
No. overall	No. in season	Title	Directed by	Written by	Original release date	Prod. code	U.S. viewers (millions)
1	1	"Stuck in the Middle"	Jon Rosenbaum	Teleplay by : Alison Brown & Linda Videtti Figueiredo; Story by : Alison Brown	February 14, 2016	101	2.81
Harley struggles to get her siblings and parents to the park, where she is to receive a young inventor's award. She looks to Ethan for help and encouragement that they will make it to the park, but Georgie has a basketball game and Rachel is serving at a soup kitchen. Harley worries the basketball game will not finish on time. Rachel decides to spend time with her boyfriend Cuff after her volunteer work, despite her parents' admonitions. The Diaz family does eventually arrive at the park, though late for Harley's award. Guest stars: Lauren Pritchard as Bethany Peters, Lulu Lambros as Ellie Peters, Brett Pierce as Cuff
2	2	"Stuck in the Sweet Seat"	Jon Rosenbaum	Erika Kaestle & Patrick McCarthy	March 11, 2016	102	1.64
It is Harley's 13th birthday, but it seems no one remembers. Harley believes her parents will feel guilty about forgetting her special day, and decides to use that "guilt" to get the best seat in the family car as a present—the sweet seat, reserved for the oldest child, which is Rachel. To ensure she gets the sweet seat, and as soon as her siblings become aware of what day it is, Harley urges them to stay quiet about it for the rest of the day and distract Suzy and Tom from remembering. In trying to keep her birthday a secret, Harley endures demands from Daphne to keep quiet, as well as getting into trouble. Later that night, Georgie reminds Harley how precious celebrating birthdays with the family is becoming, as the older siblings will soon be leaving home. That prompts Harley to let go of her desire for the sweet seat and let the family know about her big day. As for that sweet seat, she can wait.
3	3	"Stuck with a Guy on the Couch"	David Kendall	Denise Moss	March 18, 2016	104	1.67
When Suzy and Tom refuse to buy the children another tablet to replace the one they broke, Harley comes up with a plan to raise money for that tablet. She decides to rent the family couch to a stranger, picking up the idea from the Peters, who are renting a room in their house. With Ethan's help, she books an Asian music student, Bai Hsu, to stay in the Diaz home for two nights. Bai's accommodations are not exactly as he expects since the children are trying to keep Suzy and Tom from becoming suspicious. When Bai cannot sleep in the Diaz home on the second night, Harley brings him to her father's store, where he ends up sleeping by a raft. The next morning, Harley, Ethan and Georgie discover Bai and the raft are gone. Tom tells them he sold the raft to Bai, whom he recognized in selfies Rachel posted online. As Tom did not accept any additional money from Bai, Harley's effort to fund the new tablet falls short. Meanwhile, the younger children attempt to raise money themselves by promoting frog wrestling. Guest stars: Lauren Pritchard as Bethany Peters, Lulu Lambros as Ellie Peters, Alex Shimizu as Bai Hsu, Kay Bess as Woman's Voice
4	4	"Stuck at the Movies"	Jon Rosenbaum	David McHugh & Matt Flanagan	March 25, 2016	103	1.73
While using her sure-fire way to get free stuff from companies through her "feedback" approach, Harley forgets she has a school science project due until her mother reminds her and wants to see that project. Meanwhile, Suzy is preoccupied with the family's Wi-Fi bill and complains to their provider, but when she follows Harley's system of company feedback by asking for free service and threatening cancellation, the Wi-Fi provider summarily cancels their service, which causes the children to become restless. To calm them down, Suzy and Tom decide to take the family to the movies. Harley figures she can come up with her project before the movie begins, while monitoring the seats she reserved for the family, but fails even after she manages to build something. The Diaz family ends up having a short stay at the theater as Suzy and Tom notice the movie they are watching is not G-rated. Harley finally settles on her project when Ethan shows her behind-the-scenes family moments he captured on his phone while at the theater; she builds a film projector so the family can watch those moments. It does help them pass the time without Wi-Fi service, which Suzy hopes to get restored. Guest star: Matt Webb as Usher
5	5	"Stuck in the Block Party"	David Kendall	Allan Rice	April 1, 2016	105	1.59
The annual neighborhood block party is nearing, and Harley persuades her mother to let the family do the big activity for the event. To the shock of Ms. Peters, who is not keen on the seeing the Diaz family handle this responsibility, Suzy tells her the family is taking charge of the activity. Harley is left to come up with ideas and wants to do so undisturbed. She moves out of her bedroom and establishes her quiet space for thinking in a closet, leading Rachel and Georgie to fight for Harley's space in the bedroom. The quietude deeply affects Harley's creative mind, and the ideas she is able to muster lack any excitement. Harley realizes she needs the chaos from her siblings for inspiration. She tries to move back into her bedroom with Rachel and Georgie, but when her sisters disallow that, she has Daphne become their roommate. As Harley sees Daphne transport their sisters' stuff out the bedroom window, it inspires Harley to build a roller coaster for the block party. Guest stars: Lauren Pritchard as Bethany Peters, Lulu Lambros as Ellie Peters
6	6	"Stuck in the Slushinator"	Jon Rosenbaum	Lance Whinery	April 8, 2016	106	1.64
At 13, Harley has become old enough to work at her father's marina store and is eager to do so. However, Tom refuses to give her that opportunity, fearing disaster such as what he experienced with Rachel, Ethan and Georgie, so Harley tries to convince him for her chance and succeeds. She wants to add a slushy machine to the store, but after her father disapproves its $500 price tag, she unveils her cost-efficient alternative, the slushinator, powered by bicycles which she hires Lewie and Beast to pedal. It provides a boost to Tom's business, but the twins later decide they are done with slushy-making and want to do something else. After Harley gives the two incentive to return, the twins end up fighting, and their war is felt beyond the store. Harley eventually patches things up between the two. Though her slushinator is short-lived, her father commends her for not sinking his business and offers her the opportunity to continue working for him at the store. Meanwhile, Suzy wants the family to prepare for a church photo at the house, while Daphne takes care of what she believes is a cat. When it comes time for the photo, Daphne introduces the animal, which everyone discovers is actually a skunk. Guest star: Joel Steingold as Tony
7	7	"Stuck in the Mother's Day Gift"	Jon Rosenbaum	Linda Videtti Figueiredo	April 29, 2016	107	1.53
Every Mother's Day, Harley makes a gift for her mother, while her siblings simply step in to share credit for it without contributing. For this Mother's Day, though, Harley wants the others to come up with their own presents. All their gift ideas fall short of expectation, but Harley and Georgie's decision to get the family car professionally cleaned and detailed leads to panic when the car is not back in time. With her siblings' help, Harley tries to investigate what happened to it, only to come up empty. When Suzy also wants to know what happened to the car, the children take responsibility for its missing. It turns out the car is fine, just parked somewhere else near the house all cleaned up, and Suzy is pleasantly surprised by its makeover. In the end, Harley does not mind her siblings sharing the credit with her on this Mother's Day gift.
8	8	"Stuck in Harley's Comet"	Paul Hoen	Denise Moss	May 13, 2016	108	1.34
With her three younger siblings at their grandmother's with Suzy and her older siblings having plans, Harley gets a rare opportunity to do something on her own in the house. After getting her father's permission, she decides to invite her friends over to an outdoor slumber party for a rare comet viewing. Ellie arrives early for the party, but Harley's sleepover plans do not go smoothly as she deals with Rachel getting grounded, as well as Ethan and Georgie getting tricked at an event for unique basketball shoes. Also, as Harley goes out her bedroom window with Ellie to prepare for the comet's arrival, before the other girls arrive, Ellie's fear of heights causes her to accidentally lock her and Harley out on the roof. Harley tries different ways to get them out of the predicament without her father knowing. One of those ideas ends up distorting the Diaz family's satellite dish, and since Tom was watching television, she gets caught and grounded. After Tom rescues the two girls, they witness the comet's passing. Guest stars: Lulu Lambros as Ellie Peters, Farrah Mackenzie as Sweet Girl Absent: Ariana Greenblatt as Daphne Diaz, Nicolas Bechtel as Lewie Diaz, Malachi Barton as Beast Diaz, Cerina Vincent as Suzy Diaz
9	9	"Stuck with Mom's New Friend"	Jon Rosenbaum	Linda Videtti Figueiredo	May 20, 2016	110	1.41
While Tom is away at Georgie's basketball tournament, Suzy runs the marina store. It worries Harley because her mother is hanging around her too much at the store. Harley and Ethan soon discover that Suzy's lack of friends—including not staying in touch with her old ones—is causing her to cling a lot to the family, so the two use an online site to connect their mother with a new friend who also lives in Marshport. When they find one who is almost a perfect match, they are shocked that it is their own next door neighbor, Bethany Peters. As she and Suzy spend time together as friends, the Diaz children notice radical changes, such as healthy food, limited television time and no dangerous objects, none of which suits them. Attempting to return things to normal, Harley asks her mother to invite Ms. Peters to Daphne's school play. Thanks to Rachel's musical direction for the play with Daphne the center of attention, the play turns too wild for Bethany's taste and effectively ends her brief friendship with Suzy. Guest stars: Lauren Pritchard as Bethany Peters, Lulu Lambros as Ellie Peters Absent: Kayla Maisonet as Georgie Diaz, Joe Nieves as Tom Diaz
10	10	"Stuck with My Sister's Boyfriend"	Jon Rosenbaum	David McHugh & Matt Flanagan	June 3, 2016	111	1.55
With school on break, Cuff is spending a lot of time at the Diaz house with Rachel, which also leads to his hanging with the twins. This overwhelms Harley because he is invading her personal stuff and Ethan because Lewie and Beast start thinking of Cuff as their older brother. Harley decides to find a job for Cuff, who winds up working at her father's marina store with her. Harley later tries to get him to quit by having him do a lot of unpleasant tasks around the store, but Cuff actually likes the work. When Rachel comes into the store to be with her boyfriend, he decides his job is more important, and it devastates Rachel. Cuff's absence at the house affects the twins as well, and Ethan struggles to be the awesome older brother again in their eyes. Seeing Rachel miserable prompts Harley to talk to Cuff about winning Rachel back. In showing Rachel how much he loves her, Cuff ends up getting fired by Tom for defacing store merchandise. Guest star: Brett Pierce as Cuff Absent: Ariana Greenblatt as Daphne Diaz, Kayla Maisonet as Georgie Diaz, Cerina Vincent as Suzy Diaz
11	11	"Stuck with a Winner"	Linda Mendoza	Jess Pineda	June 10, 2016	112	1.32
With Georgie in her sports off-season, outside of basketball, soccer and softball, Harley tries to involve her in another sport during the break. Knowing Georgie's tendency to score low when she plays, Harley gets her to try out for the golf team and invents a set of remote-controlled balls that will assure her a spot. When Georgie makes the team and starts feeling and acting like a winner, Harley tells her the truth about the golf balls and feels guilty about the cheating. Georgie eventually gives up on sports altogether and wants to become a regular teenage girl, but Harley reminds her how much the sports get the family involved, despite how bad she is. Meanwhile, Suzy challenges Rachel, Lewie, Beast and Daphne to cook dinner after they complain about her meals. After being successful with it once, Rachel and the twins are not thrilled with cooking all the time, so they prepare a less-than palatable meal to get out of it. Guest star: Jill Basey as Mrs. Sullivan Absent: Joe Nieves as Tom Diaz
12	12	"Stuck with No Rules"	Paul Hoen	Erika Kaestle & Patrick McCarthy	June 17, 2016	109	1.30
While Harley is looking for parts for a snow machine she plans to build, her parents discover a gift certificate for a bed and breakfast trip, which Tom's parents gave to them but is nearly expired. Harley sees that as an opportunity for the two to get away for the weekend and suggests Rachel be in charge. It takes a lot of convincing for Suzy and Tom to believe their 16-year-old daughter is up to the job, but they go on their trip. Harley builds her snow machine and gives Rachel the opportunity to experience a ski vacation in the backyard; the two share a rare but brief sister bond, which ends when Rachel invites her friends over as well as Cuff. Lewie and Beast tackle a list of "don'ts" by doing everything forbidden on that list, while Ethan and Georgie wrestle with Daphne over the television remote. None of them know their parents are watching every minute of the action at the house through their tablet, and they occasionally call. When the house becomes a mess, and Suzy and Tom phone they are coming home, Harley looks to Rachel to take charge. With Rachel's leadership, the house gets clean in time. Guest star: Brett Pierce as Cuff
13	13	"Stuck in the Harley Car"	Jon Rosenbaum	Allan Rice	July 18, 2016	114	1.43
Ahead of Marshport's tricentennial celebration, Harley invents a pedicab for Ethan's tour business. When the slushy machine breaks down at the marina store, and Harley needs money to replace a part, she teams up with Ethan. Harley's end of the business becomes a shuttle service and later expands into a daycare service. When Ethan finds out his tours were turned into babysitting rides, he quits and Harley continues solo. Although Harley is enjoying the money she is making from the pedicab venture, she misses her slushy business more and decides to fix the slushy machine. She turns the pedicab back over to Ethan for his tours, after which the two happen to spot singer Rachel Platten, the surprise celebrity guest for the tricentennial parade, who needs a ride to her float. Meanwhile, Georgie is selected to lead the parade by Mrs. Sullivan, who also helps get her in shape to walk the route, while Rachel and Daphne compete for Marshport queen. Georgie winds up directing the parade into the Diaz backyard. Special appearance by: Rachel Platten Guest stars: Jill Basey as Mrs. Sullivan, Eva Simone Fisher as Woman, Beau Dylan Hart as Kid 1, Toby Grey as Kid 2 Absent: Nicolas Bechtel as Lewie Diaz, Malachi Barton as Beast Diaz, Cerina Vincent as Suzy Diaz
14	14	"Stuck in Lockdown"	Linda Mendoza	Julia Ahumada Grob & Bryan Larrivee	July 19, 2016	113	1.38
Harley's latest invention, an efficient laundry transport, leads to trouble. After Daphne uses the invention to transport herself downstairs and nearly gets hurt, she blames Harley when their mother checks on what happened. Suzy sends Harley to her room and puts her on "lockdown", the severest form of punishment in the Diaz family. With Harley confined to her bedroom, Tom has Rachel and Georgie work at his marina store, while Harley looks to get back at her younger sister for always getting her in trouble. When she sees Daphne doing something suspicious in the backyard, she elicits Ethan's help and sneaks out of her room. They are ready to bust Daphne as she sells her toys and other things to the neighbors, but when Harley finds out why, she realizes how much she has been neglecting her sister lately. Meanwhile, Rachel and Georgie are put on lockdown after Tom catches them throwing a party in the marina store. Harley manages to return to her bedroom, with her siblings' help, before her older sisters join her in confinement. When Suzy sees evidence suggesting Harley snuck out, Daphne blames Ethan, but Harley comes clean; Suzy adds Ethan to the lockdown. Daphne then gets herself in trouble to join her sisters and spend time with them. All the while, Lewie and Beast are on a week-long camping trip and manage to make it through one day before Suzy decides they have gotten into enough trouble and brings them home. Absent: Nicolas Bechtel as Lewie Diaz, Malachi Barton as Beast Diaz
15	15	"Stuck Without a Ride"	Jon Rosenbaum	Lance Whinery	July 20, 2016	115	1.29
Harley needs to go to a music event in Boston, where an invention of hers is entered in a contest. Her mother is unable to drive her there, so she looks to Rachel, who has her learner's permit, and asks her to take the driving test to get her license. Suzy finds out Rachel's driving instructor, Phil, is someone she knew in high school. When Rachel fails her test, she and Harley wonder what happened in Phil and Suzy's past that may have influenced his grading. Harley arranges for Phil to come over to the house so he and Suzy can shed light on their time together. As for Rachel's driving test, it turns out Suzy is insecure about any of her children driving, so she asked Phil to fail her daughter even though Rachel had demonstrated to her mother that she is a good driver. Having been unfair to Rachel, Suzy asks Phil for a retest and he is able to schedule it before Harley's trip. Meanwhile, Ethan is doing a buddy cop film and casts Lewie and Beast as the cops. During the filming, the twins happen to tamper with Harley's invention; when Harley shows Phil her invention, it malfunctions and Phil gets further endangered by the twins for the final scene of the film. Suzy ends up driving the family to Boston. Guest star: Gabriel Tigerman as Phil Absent: Ariana Greenblatt as Daphne Diaz, Kayla Maisonet as Georgie Diaz, Joe Nieves as Tom Diaz
16	16	"Stuck in the Quinceañera"	Erika Kaestle	Erika Kaestle & Patrick McCarthy	July 21, 2016	116	1.49
Georgie's 15th birthday is days away, but she wants to have a simple party rather than her quinceañera, as she does not like being the center of attention. Though Harley is motivated to use her new "Harleycam" invention for the event, she reminds Georgie about the significance of this special day in the life of a Latina and convinces her to change her mind. Harley gets the rest of the family involved with the planning, but Georgie later backs out, still feeling uncomfortable about the occasion. When the family lets Georgie decide how she wants to celebrate her special day, and whom to invite, she is back on board, with her quinceañera in the Diaz backyard. However, the threat from a hurricane forces the family to turn the occasion into a simple, private celebration inside the Diaz house. With Georgie's ankle getting hurt from the storm's first gusts, the quinceañera's traditional dance is in jeopardy of not occurring until Harley comes up with an idea.
17	17	"Stuck in the Diaz of Our Lives"	Erika Kaestle	Linda Videtti Figueiredo	July 22, 2016	117	2.06
Harley gets to appear on the television series Girl Power to highlight her accomplishments as an inventor. When Mischa and Ken, the two-person crew for the series, see Harley's large family, they decide to go a different route and feature the family in a reality series called The Diaz of Our Lives. As the crew gets to know the family through filming, they make multiple changes such that the Diazes become displeased with the direction of the series and want to quit. Mischa reminds them that they are under contract, but when Harley shows footage of the crew's plans, using the camera feature of her vacuum cleaner invention she first showcased on Girl Power, the crew calls off the reality series. Guest stars: Kim Shaw as Mischa, Paul Darrigo as Ken

=== Season 2 (2017) ===
No. overall	No. in season	Title	Directed by	Written by	Original release date	Prod. code	U.S. viewers (millions)
18	1	"Stuck in the Waterpark – The Movie"	David Kendall	Linda Videtti Figueiredo	February 3, 2017	201–202	2.13
The Diaz family earns a free weekend vacation at Cannon Ball Cove after the waterpark installs Harley's "Dry-Through" invention for a test run. The children have to convince Suzy and Tom that this vacation will not cause them grief, and sign a contract to that effect. When they arrive at the waterpark, a four-hour trip by car, they realize their hotel room is not large enough for them. Although the children complain about it, and Suzy and Tom are prepared to take them to Pilgrim Land instead, everyone agrees they have come this far and settle on staying. Harley and Rachel find a place to relax, taking over a cabana that another family gives up, while Georgie hesitates on trying the Doom Funnel ride, which Beast and Lewie are too short to try themselves. Ethan, who also wants to go on that ride but injures his right foot by stepping on a bee, spends his money on a ring toss event, impressing a girl named Hannah. As Harley, Rachel and later the rest of the children enjoy themselves in the cabana, Chester Torvilleton, the park's supervisor, presents them with a bill totaling $800, for drinks and treats they thought came free with the cabana. As Suzy and Tom are enjoying the free vacation, the children are not ready to tell their parents about the bill and decide to come up with a way to handle it. They persuade Mr. Torvilleton to forgive the bill, and he is willing to do so after seeing a sad Daphne, but Lewie and Beast ruin that. With the children's options exhausted, Harley is faced with delivering the unpleasant news until she sees that she can pay off the bill if she and her family participate in the park's annual "aqualympics" and win, the prize being $1,000. They face a tough competitor in the Pillman family, a five-time champion whose patriarch Harley and Rachel met earlier when they were in the cabana; Ethan discovers Hannah is also one of the Pillmans. The two families make it to the finals, and as they are about to go head-to-head in the rope tug-of-war, Harley realizes the value of her invention at the park, which no one was using. She has her family dry off in it while the Pillman family chooses to remain wet, the deciding factor which leads to the Diaz family winning. Guest stars: Gregg Binkley as Chester Torvilleton, Tom Parker as Mr. Pillman, Kate Tomlinson as Hannah, Corey Dorris as Malcolm, Christopher Chen as Fed Up Dad Note: This episode was advertised as a TV movie by Disney Channel and is sold as such.
19	2	"Stuck in a Commercial"	Joe Menendez	Erika Kaestle & Patrick McCarthy	February 10, 2017	203	1.09
Tom has bought some ad time on television to promote his bait shop, but when Harley sees a commercial her father plans to submit, made eleven years ago, she feels embarrassed over what happened to her in the commercial and does not want everyone to see it. Knowing Ethan's skill as a film maker, Harley proposes to make a new commercial for the shop, but also knowing Ethan's tendency to quit whatever he sets out to do, she is willing to stick with the old commercial should the project fail. To ensure Ethan stays focused, she secretly monitors his filming activity while building a camera rig to use for the final part of the commercial. Difficulties arise while Ethan is filming, including Daphne's being jinxed by Lewie and Beast, Rachel and Suzy's trying to buy Adele concert tickets, and Georgie's looking after her coach's pet parrot Leo. It becomes a huge mess leading Ethan to quit, but Harley talks sense into him about not giving up. Even with the limited footage, Ethan puts together a commercial worthy of airing on television. Guest star: Audrey Wasilewski as Leo
20	3	"Stuck in the School Photo"	Mike Mariano	David McHugh & Matt Flanagan	February 17, 2017	204	1.37
When Suzy sees Harley, Rachel, Ethan and Georgie's shocking school pictures, she wants to know the story behind them. The four teenagers recount what happened in school three weeks earlier, on picture day. Rachel wanted the right outfit for her picture and resorted to searching for a top in lost and found boxes, while Ethan celebrated the return of sloppy joe to the cafeteria menu, hoping a food fight would not erupt. Georgie was rejoicing about her recent success in a basketball game and wanted everything to happen exactly as it did that day. Meanwhile, Harley was looking forward to the scientific thrill of indoor skydiving after school, but her substitute teacher Mr. Delorco, known for giving detention to her older siblings, stood in her way. Harley did not want to become the latest Diaz to get into trouble with him, so her friend Ellie helped out. When they were around Mr. Delorco, each of them assumed the other's identity, which ended up carrying over into their pictures because the teacher was present for those. Once the story is over, Suzy hears a knock on the door. Thinking that it is Ms. Peters, Suzy tells Harley, Rachel, Ethan, and Georgie to hide. Guest stars: Peter Breitmayer as Mr. Delorco, Lulu Lambros as Ellie Peters, Zach Timson as Chet, Bentley Green as Miles, Jamison Reeves as Photographer Absent: Ariana Greenblatt as Daphne Diaz, Nicolas Bechtel as Lewie Diaz, Malachi Barton as Beast Diaz, Joe Nieves as Tom Diaz
21	4	"Stuck in a Slushy War"	David Kendall	Denise Moss	February 24, 2017	205	0.99
Harley hires Phil Durning to assist with her slushy business at the bait shop. Phil is in need of a job after he got fired from the department of motor vehicles, for a single bad review that Harley wrote after he failed Rachel on her driving test. When Phil starts working for Harley, he senses her discomfort about being his boss, but after Harley tells him to pursue his passion, he decides to open a competing slushy service on wheels. Meanwhile, Rachel is teaching Daphne proper etiquette and dress for a birthday party she has been invited to, and while Daphne goes along with Rachel's advice at first, she comes to the party dressing and acting as herself. Phil becomes furious when he discovers Harley got him fired from his original job, and he works to steal customers away from Harley's slushy business. Ethan and Harley come up with a plan to shut down Phil's business, except they fail to think things through in developing the plan. Ultimately, Harley discovers Phil's passion is to be an instructor for first-time drivers and encourages him to open his own driving school. Guest stars: Gabriel Tigerman as Phil, Brooke Singleton as Girl Absent: Kayla Maisonet as Georgie Diaz, Cerina Vincent as Suzy Diaz
22	5	"Stuck in the Garage Sale"	Eric Dean Seaton	Allan Rice	March 3, 2017	207	0.97
As the Diaz family prepares for their annual garage sale, Harley is not enthusiastic about it because she is always left to organize the event. She wants to call it off, but Ethan encourages her to hold the sale and deliberately make it a failure. After Tom tells Harley he and Suzy will double whatever money the family earns, she scraps Ethan's plan and wants everyone to make as much money as possible, so they can reach their goal to buy an above-ground swimming pool. Lewie and Beast become so wound up in the process that they end up selling Harley's invention bag. Seeing how much the bag means to Harley, her siblings work to get it back from the lady who bought it, and their effort cost them nearly all they made in the garage sale. Guest star: Carol Mansell as Fran Absent: Cerina Vincent as Suzy Diaz
23	6	"Stuck in the Diaz Easter"	Joe Menendez	Lance Whinery	April 7, 2017	206	1.10
Harley wants Daphne to experience a traditional Diaz Easter and rallies her parents into getting it started on the eve of the holiday. When the children wake up the next morning, though, they see no Easter baskets. Suzy planned to put them together, but she is dealing with a cold and slept through the night. The family, except for Suzy, goes to Easter service at church, but during service, Tom is called to his bait shop because of a malfunctioning refrigerator and brings Ethan with him. With the way the holiday has started out, Daphne becomes disappointed that it will be just another Easter like the others she remembers. Though her other siblings feel the same way, Harley is not about to give up on her promise of a traditional celebration. She, Rachel and Georgie prepare dinner back at the house, while Lewie and Beast work on the Easter baskets, but the result turns into disaster. Meanwhile, the family is unaware that Daphne is still at church, and calls from Ms. Peters to tell them go ignored. When they finally realize where Daphne is, and see that she helped with organizing the Easter dinner at church, they are relieved and proud of what she did, and they also help out with the dinner. Guest stars: Lulu Lambros as Ellie Peters, Lauren Pritchard as Bethany Peters
24	7	"Stuck in the Beast-Day Party"	Mike Mariano	Erika Kaestle & Patrick McCarthy	April 14, 2017	208	0.97
As Harley tries her virtual reality helmet in the attic, which is off-limits to the Diaz children, Lewie and Beast wonder what all the commotion is up there. When the two check on Harley, they discover their birth certificates to find they were born minutes apart on different dates. When Suzy and Tom find out, they promise the twins separate parties for their ninth birthdays in a few months. Lewie and Beast use Harley's being in the attic as leverage to have her throw Beast a half-birthday party, and as the twins believe Ethan suggested it, Harley has him involved in organizing it as well. Lewie becomes unsatisfied with Harley and Ethan's planning and decides to take over. Beast seems okay with Lewie's ideas, but Harley makes Beast realize he should go with what he likes for his party, which leads to Lewie feeling left out. After Suzy and Tom see how Harley has made Beast's party possible, they decide to clear space in the attic for her to use, until they find her virtual reality helmet already there. Meanwhile, Rachel is stressed over taking the SAT because she worries being distracted by boys who will also be taking the test, so she seeks Georgie's help. Georgie finds herself distracted during the test after a boy gets her attention but she has no idea who. Guest stars: Adam Hochstetter as Wyatt, Matt Lowe as Dumpster Jack, Shana Gregory Williams as Proctor Absent: Ariana Greenblatt as Daphne Diaz
25	8	"Stuck Without Devices"	David Kendall	David McHugh & Matt Flanagan	April 21, 2017	210	1.00
Suzy gets fed up when the children are not paying attention or helping her with the groceries, so she confiscates all their electronic devices and wants the family to come together without the technology-based distractions for two days. Lewie and Beast play a game designed to annoy other family members and manage to recruit Rachel into playing, with the loser doing the winner's chores for a whole week, while Ethan uses his tech-free time as a magician but fails to impress Daphne, who stumps Ethan with her own magic. Harley and Georgie bond together doing Double Dutch as they did when they were younger, using an invention Harley built after Rachel became boy-crazy, but when Georgie's response to a text from Wyatt leads him to come to the house to be with her, she pays more attention to him than to Harley. With Rachel, Lewie and Beast tied in their game, they decide to target Wyatt to break the tie, which turns into chaos in the backyard and ruins the picnic Suzy has planned. Realizing she got her point across to the children, Suzy decides to return the electronic devices to everyone except the twins, who were responsible for the backyard mess. Guest star: Adam Hochstetter as Wyatt Absent: Joe Nieves as Tom Diaz
26	9	"Stuck with a Boy Genius"	Victor Nelli	Denise Moss	April 28, 2017	211	1.17
Rachel, Ethan and Georgie prepare for their spring formal at school. Harley has no interest in going or asking some guy she is not friends with, but when she receives a text from her friend Josh, who is a sophomore at a different high school and an inventor like Harley, her sisters suggest she ask him. After Josh accepts, Harley gets ready for her first formal. The two have never met face-to-face, so it comes as a huge surprise when Harley finds out Josh is only nine years old. While at the formal, Harley feels embarrassed being around him, until she sees an interesting gadget he invented and plays with it. Rachel informs Josh and Harley that they have been chosen as the formal's king and queen, and wants to spare them from doing the spotlight dance, but Harley goes forward with it and gets her siblings and their dates involved in helping her put together a dance that will not attract attention to Josh's age. Meanwhile, Lewie and Beast decide to camp in the backyard, and Suzy and Tom are not delighted about it. They send Daphne to camp with her brothers, attempting to get them to come inside. Guest stars: Adam Hochstetter as Wyatt, Caleb Brown as Josh, Robbie Davidson as Blake
27	10	"Stuck with a Bad Influence"	Jon Rosenbaum	Allan Rice	June 2, 2017	212	1.31
When Harley's siblings refuse to try out her latest invention called the Grocer-Whee, she turns to Ellie to give it a test run, but Ellie worries she will get hurt. Knowing how sheltered Ellie's life has become because of her mother, Harley works on being a good influence to her best friend by helping her through her fears. Eventually, the two ride the Grocer-Whee but end up taking out the Peters' mailbox. Thinking Ellie's punishment will be no big deal, Harley later feels guilty after Ellie tells her that she is being sent to boarding school called Radistone Academy by her mother. With Daphne, Lewie, and Beast's help, the two girls concoct a plan to convince Ms. Peters to change her mind, but she sees through their act. Still, Ms. Peters is made aware of her daughter's feelings about Radistone Academy and cancels her enrollment. Harley is relieved, but after doing research on the school, she realizes Ellie should not pass up the opportunity and has to convince her to go, even though she will miss her. Meanwhile, Rachel joins Ethan's film club at Tom's bait shop, but Suzy and Tom do some investigating after seeing what actually goes on there. Guest stars: Lulu Lambros as Ellie Peters, Lauren Pritchard as Bethany Peters Absent: Kayla Maisonet as Georgie Diaz
28	11	"Stuck in a Good Deed"	Melissa Kosar	Denise Moss	June 9, 2017	216	1.04
Suzy and Harley volunteer for a day at the Golden Horizons retirement home. When they see what activities they do there, they choose to volunteer for more days, intending to take advantage of the amenities instead. With Suzy away from home, Ethan and Georgie are put on laundry duty, while Rachel babysits Daphne. Ethan and Georgie decide to leave the dirtiest of the clothes for their mother, who later presents them the opportunity to volunteer at Golden Horizons, which they refuse. When Ethan and Georgie see the commercial that initially inspired Suzy and Harley to help the elderly, they change their mind but are shocked to see their mother and sister getting massages. Upon hearing about a birthday party being thrown for the grumpy resident Mr. Kibbenshaw, Suzy and Harley are not thrilled to be a part of it, but they arrange for the party to take place at the park. Meanwhile, at the park, Rachel tries to get out of babysitting Daphne by joining a group of nannies who look after the children on a daily rotation. When Rachel is suddenly faced with the responsibility, on the day of Mr. Kibbenshaw's party, she panics and the children run all over the place, leading to the party being ruined. Rachel gets grounded, while Ethan and Georgie are reprimanded for how they handled the dirty laundry. Guest stars: Davida Williams as Kelly, Tessa Harnetiaux as Natalie, P.L. Brown as Mr. Kibbenshaw, Richard Fancy as Larry Absent: Nicolas Bechtel as Lewie Diaz, Malachi Barton as Beast Diaz, Joe Nieves as Tom Diaz
29	12	"Stuck Dancing with My Dad"	Carlos González	Erika Kaestle & Patrick McCarthy	June 16, 2017	215	1.00
Harley seeks Troy Havana to finance her latest invention, the floor finder, and asks Rachel to drive her to Boston, where he is holding a meet-and-greet. After having no success talking to Troy, Harley finds out he will be at the Dancing with My Dad auditions in Boston, and after noticing her father and Daphne have some dancing chemistry, she asks them to take part as contestants on the show. Though not initially on board, Tom changes his mind after hearing his sports idol Brady Rice will be there. Tom and Daphne audition and secure a spot in the competition, while Harley tracks down Troy, who also happens to be a contestant with his daughter Savannah. Troy shows interest in Harley's invention, but when his offer includes the condition that her father and sister not compete, Harley not only rejects the offer but is also determined to see Troy lose. Meanwhile, Lewie and Beast are working on over 100 different ways to use peanut butter. One of those uses causes Daphne to get injured right before the dancing competition begins, resulting in Harley taking Daphne's place. In the end, Tom and Harley score better than Troy and Savannah, but finish second to Brady Rice and his daughter. Guest star: Laird Macintosh as Troy Havana Absent: Kayla Maisonet as Georgie Diaz, Cerina Vincent as Suzy Diaz
30	13	"Stuck in a Gold Medal Performance"	David Kendall	Lance Whinery	June 23, 2017	209	1.33
Rachel has joined the spirit squad at school and looks to Harley to come up with something creative for the basketball games. Harley decides on a laser light show and quickly develops a controller for it, which malfunctions and catches fire when she exhibits it at school. Though Harley promises Rachel she will fix the problem in time for a pep rally, she fears the controller will malfunction again and ends up bailing. Meanwhile, Georgie meets Olympic gold medalist Laurie Hernandez at a signing in Boston and, through talk about their Latina heritage, persuades Laurie to visit her home for dinner. Georgie feels she is lacking in the customs, dances and language, but she tries to get her parents to make an authentic meal for Laurie, who decides to stop in Marshport and visit the Diaz home. At dinner, Rachel fumes over Harley's no-show at the pep rally, while the meal is too spicy for Laurie's taste. Georgie and Harley learn about persevering through failure as Laurie recounts her rougher times as a gymnast to them. At the next school basketball game, Harley's laser light show runs smoothly, and the crowd gets to see some gymnastics from Laurie as a bonus. Special guest star: Laurie Hernandez as herself Guest star: Jaida-Iman Benjamin as Traci Absent: Nicolas Bechtel as Lewie Diaz, Malachi Barton as Beast Diaz
31	14	"Stuck in a New Room"	David Kendall	Linda Videtti Figueiredo	September 15, 2017	220	1.34
Using her eavesdropping invention, Harley overhears her parents talking about cleaning out the attic and turning it into a bedroom. She initially wants to keep this to herself, but Georgie gets Harley to share what she heard. Despite Georgie's intent to keep this news secret, word spreads to the rest of her siblings. With the exception of Daphne, who is not interested in giving up her current bedroom arrangement, the children attempt to convince their parents about why they deserve the attic space. Suzy and Tom call a family meeting and find out that Harley eavesdropped on their conversation in the attic, leading them to drop their plans. With the help of her siblings, Harley comes up with a proposal to decide who gets the attic, and the children offer to clean out the attic as well. They settle on a battle of boys vs. girls, with the two genders agreeing to a series of backyard competitions. When figuring out what kind of competitions, going on what they cleaned out from the attic, they make use of Harley's past inventions. Ultimately, the competitions fail to produce a winner, but the children agree to make the attic space a family game room.
32	15	"Stuck with a Dangerous House"	David Kendall	Linda Videtti Figueiredo	September 22, 2017	214	1.08
Harley, Rachel and Georgie are planning to attend a night concert on the pier, but after their parents tell them no, concerned over their safety, Harley reveals that Daphne's playhouse upstairs has been recalled for an unsafe roof. Suzy and Tom remove the playhouse, forcing Daphne to sleep in her sisters' room and disrupt their lives. Harley figures out a way to make the playhouse safe but finds out it has been discarded, so she, Rachel and Georgie are looking for a store that sells the kind Daphne had. They discover a toy store in Marshport with only one but worry the store owner will not sell it to them because of the family's history at that store. Although the girls successfully manage to purchase the new playhouse, they realize Daphne had memories with the old one in the form of various dents to it. Feeling sad, Harley discovers from Ethan that the old playhouse is in a nearby dumpster, so she, Rachel and Georgie recover the parts to it and put it back together for Daphne. Meanwhile, Ethan is directing Lewie and Beast's online channel called "Trash Twins", but the twins realize eating food from the garbage is harder than they imagined, even to impress Dumpster Jack. Guest stars: Matt Lowe as Dumpster Jack, Aaron Krebs as Duncan Gloverman
33	16	"Stuck with a New Friend"	Erika Kaestle	Erika Kaestle & Patrick McCarthy	September 29, 2017	219	1.13
Harley meets a new student at school named Sophie, whom she eventually befriends despite an incident that ruins both of their entries for the Marshport Extreme Science Games. They decide to work together on another project for the contest, but when Sophie wants to come over to the Diaz house, Harley worries their friendship will suffer because of her siblings. After finding out Sophie likes Ethan, she expects Ethan to be kind and thoughtful to her, unlike her other friends. When Ethan misses a movie date with Sophie, though, Harley wants him to show that he regrets it, but ends up regretting her part in helping him do so after Sophie is humiliated. To save her friendship with Sophie, Harley decides to take charge of their entry at the science games when she inadvertently puts a prop in the wrong place. Meanwhile, Rachel discovers a traffic ticket in the mail, believing it to be for her mother when it is actually for her. To avoid paying a $500 fine and going to traffic school, Rachel schemes to fool Suzy into thinking she ran a red light in Rhode Island, with Lewie and Beast's help, but it backfires when she finds out. Guest stars: Talitha Bateman as Sophie, Bryan Coffee as Einstein Absent: Ariana Greenblatt as Daphne Diaz, Kayla Maisonet as Georgie Diaz, Joe Nieves as Tom Diaz
34	17	"Stuck in a Merry Scary"	David Kendall	Linda Videtti Figueiredo	October 6, 2017	221	1.18
Halloween is Harley's favorite holiday as her inventive mind gives her an edge in scaring her family every year. When Harley selects Rachel in the Halloween "Secret Scarer", she is faced with her biggest challenge yet, but is determined to scare her. A werewolf head in the microwave and spooky hands in Rachel's closet fail to do so, leading Harley to go all out with a bathroom shocker. Not only is Rachel frightened by it, but she also hurts her leg and needs to go to the hospital. This forces Harley to take Daphne trick-or-treating, but Daphne bails on her. Meanwhile, Ethan coaxes Lewie and Beast out of trick-or-treating to serve as security for their "Haunted Hang" in the backyard, to protect it from vandalism and prevent a neighbor from claiming the best haunted display. When Harley returns home and sees the Haunted Hang vandalized, she does not realize what is about to happen to her. The entire family manages to frighten her good disguised as pumpkin-headed creatures as payback for all the times she has gotten them. It turns out they had some tricks up their sleeve: they rigged the Secret Scarer draw so Harley would pick Rachel, and Rachel actually faked her injury.
35	18	"Stuck with a Hook, Line and Sinker"	Julian Petrillo	Jessica Charles & Miguel Ian Raya	October 13, 2017	217	1.10
Colt Bailey, a celebrity fisherman, comes to Marshport for a fishing tournament. Because he signs up late for the competition, he is looking for a place to stay with all the hotels booked. When he offers to pay a large sum, Harley decides to rent out the house to him, and Rachel, Ethan and Georgie offer to help out. Their plan is to save up for a trip to Hawaii, which always eludes them because of the deeds of the younger Diaz siblings. Tom gets sold on the plan with Suzy and the three youngest children away. With Colt staying at the house, Tom and the older children head on a camping trip, which turns out to be an uncomfortable stay at Tom's store because of the stormy weather. Colt asks for a number of accommodations, including a home security system, fresh bait, someone to look after his dog, and an organized kitchen without any fish products. Harley, Rachel, Ethan and Georgie try to make those accommodations work, but it becomes a disaster, which blows any savings toward the Hawaii trip. Guest star: Morgan West as Colt Bailey Absent: Ariana Greenblatt as Daphne Diaz, Nicolas Bechtel as Lewie Diaz, Malachi Barton as Beast Diaz, Cerina Vincent as Suzy Diaz
36	19	"Stuck in the Babysitting Nightmare"	David Kendall	David McHugh & Matt Flanagan	October 20, 2017	218	1.27
When the Morelands need a new babysitter for their triplets, Harley feels she is ready for the job based on her experience with Daphne, Lewie and Beast. She gets an opportunity to show she can handle the babysitting duty full-time when Suzy and Tom attend a neighborhood association meeting next door at Bethany Peters' house, and Rachel heads to a beach party with Ethan and Georgie. The younger siblings usually look forward to Harley's babysitting since she makes it fun for them, but when she does things differently, they decide to give her a true test of the job. Meanwhile, Rachel, Ethan and Georgie deal with a flat tire on the car while navigating to the beach party, but Ethan runs into trouble himself trying to replace the tire. Suzy and Tom get offended at the neighborhood meeting after Bethany details every little problem she has seen with the Diaz family. Guest stars: Lauren Pritchard as Bethany Peters, Greg Rogstad as Oscar
37	20	"Stuck in the Diaz Awards"	Leslie Kolins Small	Bryan Larrivee	October 27, 2017	213	1.31
The fifth annual Diaz Awards have arrived. Each year, the Diaz family looks back at their achievements, surprises and disappointments, and the children are awarded in various categories. Whoever wins in the most categories picks up the Diaz of the Year trophy. Harley has never won the Diaz of the Year and is hoping to change her luck, but she falls behind all of her other siblings early in the ceremony. Eventually, she pulls off a winning streak to take the lead in the tally, two ahead of Lewie and Beast with two categories to go. The twins end up taking those remaining categories and force a tiebreaker, which also goes to them. Harley painfully accepts her defeat, but Ethan informs her of a special award not based on votes, unlike the other awards handed out. Because of her overall contribution to the family, Harley is named the Most Valuable Diaz. Special guest star: Laurie Hernandez as herself Guest stars: Peter Breitmayer as Mr. Delorco, Lulu Lambros as Ellie Peters, Alex Shimizu as Bai Hsu, Jaida-Iman Benjamin as Traci, Kay Bess as Woman's Voice

=== Season 3 (2017–18) ===
No. overall	No. in season	Title	Directed by	Written by	Original release date	Prod. code	U.S. viewers (millions)
38	1	"Stuck at Christmas – The Movie"	David Kendall	Linda Videtti Figueiredo	December 8, 2017	399	1.36
As the Diaz family prepares their home for Christmas, Harley needs to know how long to steam pasteles and winds up calling Abuela to find out. Harley is hoping Abuela will ask whether the family will spend Christmas with her in Florida, but when the question does not come up, Harley is prompted to bring the family there. They initially take a plane to Florida, but when a storm in the flight's path causes the plane to land in Columbus, Ohio, they settle on two small, uncomfortable rental cars to continue their journey. The discomfort is short-lived as Harley spots a huge tour bus belonging to a rock band that is not around to claim it. With Tom having a license to drive that kind of vehicle, the family continues their trip in the bus and decorates it for the holiday. Daphne suddenly realizes her doll "Deathnee" is missing, which Harley traces back to the rental cars, so the family tracks down the doll, while Suzy confiscates the children's electronic devices which had distracted them when the doll went missing. The family ends up at a camp where they meet another family with a little girl named Joyanne, who has Deathnee and is not about to give her up. Georgie makes a deal with Joyanne, getting back Deathnee in exchange for toys she collected for a toy drive. As the Diaz family gets ready to leave, Tom sees a penny he hopes will bring good luck, but as he picks it up, the contents of his pouch, which includes their money, credit cards and electronic devices, falls into the camp fire. Adding to the misery, the bus later breaks down, with the impact causing Harley's glass ornament for Abuela to break. Hoping to reach Abuela's by Christmas, the Diaz family turns to a repairman named Buddy Burtz, whom Harley discovers is a middle child just like her, often ignored by his brothers. With the backlog at the Burtz repair shop, Tom offers to pay double to get the bus fixed, while Suzy attempts to withdraw the necessary funds from the bank, which falls through. Harley finds out that Buddy's brothers are taking part in an annual holiday race known as the Iron Elf but are not interested in having Buddy on their team due to his fear in one event the year he took part. Harley strikes a deal with Buddy, having him compete with her family in the race, and if they win, he will fix the bus for free. Buddy ends up facing the event he struggled with before, but with Harley believing he will overcome his fear, he succeeds, helping the Diaz family pull out the victory. Harley gives the trophy to Buddy, while the children donate the presents they won on Georgie's request. Sticking to his end of the deal, Buddy prepares to work on the bus, with his brothers offering to help. The Diaz family makes it to Florida in time, and they surprise Abuela with their visit. She surprises them by celebrating the holiday on the beachside. Guest stars: Olga Merediz as Abuela, Steve Monroe as Buddy Burtz, Stephen Kramer Glickman as Benny, Judy Kain as Mrs. McDoogan, Eileen O'Connell as Marla, Ron G as Rental Agent, Troy Blendell as Roger, Chloe Perrin as Joyanne, Patrick Faucette as Cop Note: Ronni Hawk departs the series as a main cast member in this season. Additionally, this episode was advertised as a TV movie by Disney Channel and is sold as such.
39	2	"Stuck with Rachel's Secret"	Jon Rosenbaum	Erika Kaestle & Patrick McCarthy	January 19, 2018	303	1.16
When Rachel starts acting unusually generous, her siblings become suspicious. Harley and Georgie later find out that during Rachel's Christmas trip to France, she applied to a fashion internship at a university there and got accepted. The internship starts much sooner than the family was expecting Rachel to leave for college, and she needs the support of her siblings to help with breaking the news to Suzy and Tom, but Daphne and the twins are not on board. With some trickery from Rachel, Ethan takes the three youngsters to the mall and ends up getting a makeup job after displaying his knowledge about it to a store customer, while the other three are reminded about Rachel anywhere they go in the makeup store. Meanwhile, Rachel tells Suzy and Tom about her internship, but they are not convinced she is ready to go so soon and recall a large list of promises she failed to deliver on. They change their mind after she proves she can deliver on those promises, which got fulfilled with her siblings' help. As Harley and Georgie prepare for Rachel's leaving, they hear from her that she missed the enrollment deadline at the school and is not going, but later find out she actually withdrew her application. Upon questioning her, they realize she is afraid to leave but they help her through it. After an emotional goodbye at the airport, the family wonders who will take over Rachel's spot in the car, the sweet seat, but not even Harley is ready to do so. Special guest star: Ronni Hawk as Rachel Diaz Guest stars: Briana Lane as Jayden, Alana Baer as Chloe, Anissa Borrego as Girl
40	3	"Stuck with a Diaz Down"	Mike Mariano	David McHugh & Matt Flanagan	January 26, 2018	304	1.07
With the Diaz family missing Rachel, they look to Georgie to fill her shoes as the oldest sibling, and Harley attempts to prepare her for a number of situations that could arise. Unable to deal with the pressure of this responsibility, Georgie panics and Harley finds herself stepping into the job. When faced with resolving two problems her other siblings bring up—Ethan's struggles dating Chloe, and how Lewie and Daphne should handle Beast after he reveals the truth about Rachel's "blackmail book"—Harley winds up giving the wrong advice. Both Harley and Georgie realize it is better to just be themselves when tackling the problems of their siblings, and Georgie manages things all right doing just that. In the final scene, Harley and Georgie have an encounter with a boy named Aidan, whose ball was accidentally shot through their bedroom window. Guest stars: Joshua Bassett as Aidan, Alana Baer as Chloe
41	4	"Stuck in Camp Chaos"	Eric Dean Seaton	Lance Whinery	February 2, 2018	305	1.07
With Ellie on winter break from Radistone Academy for a week, Harley wants to do something fun with her during that time. As the two brainstorm, they settle on running a camp for youngsters in the Diaz backyard, which Harley hopes will also fund a special quinceañera gift. Suzy has no problem with the camp idea as this would keep Daphne, Lewie and Beast occupied. Daphne has no interest in the camp, so Harley has Georgie keep an eye on her. Meanwhile, Harley has to deal with her new neighbor Aidan, who is also Ellie's cousin and a lacrosse player. His hitting balls into and over the fence separating the Diaz and Peters backyards is disrupting camp activities. Harley tries to be diplomatic by getting him to stop while she is conducting camp, but he refuses to cooperate. Things get worse when Aidan moves the fence deeper into the Diaz backyard, causing Harley to retaliate and her friendship with Ellie to suffer. When her campers, including Lewie and Beast, bring the fence down, it is enough to disturb Suzy, who shuts the camp down and leaves Harley to clean up the mess. Harley realizes this is only the beginning with Aidan, who shows up at her school and plans to be around for the whole semester. Guest stars: Lulu Lambros as Ellie Peters, Joshua Bassett as Aidan, Antonio Raul Corbo as Hunter Absent: Isaak Presley as Ethan Diaz, Joe Nieves as Tom Diaz
42	5	"Stuck with Harley's Bethany"	David Kendall	Allan Rice	February 9, 2018	306	1.01
Harley's dislike of Aidan continues to consume her as it is now affecting her at school. She asks her mother for tips on how to deal with him, knowing her long-term battle with Bethany is similar. Suzy tells Harley to simply agree with Aidan, as that is what she does to avoid arguments with Bethany. The method appears to work at first, while Harley and Aidan work together near the restored fence between their backyards, but when Aidan messes up Harley's delivery of the school's announcements, it becomes a battleground that everyone at school witnesses, with Harley accidentally broadcasting her argument with Aidan over the PA system. Suzy and Bethany also hear the two bickering, since they are volunteering at the school's bake sale, and they start to argue once Harley brings up how she has been coping with Aidan using Suzy's "yes for no distress" technique. Meanwhile, Ethan is trying to get new subscribers for his web channel by filming a new segment starring Lewie and Beast at Tom's store, but when they see the segment is a failure and are no longer allowed to film in the store, they go to the bake sale and end up capturing Suzy and Bethany's arguing on camera. Harley tries another method to cope with Aidan, developing special earplugs to keep herself from hearing his boasts. Guest stars: Lauren Pritchard as Bethany Peters, Joshua Bassett as Aidan Absent: Ariana Greenblatt as Daphne Diaz, Kayla Maisonet as Georgie Diaz
43	6	"Stuck in a Nice Relationship"	Carlos González	David Baldy	March 9, 2018	307	1.02
Harley feels like a third wheel in Georgie and Wyatt's relationship, as she is involved in making their decisions. When Harley leaves the two to plan a romantic day, it turns disastrous and leads Georgie to want to break up with Wyatt. Georgie tries to get Harley to do it for her, but upon realizing this is happening on Wyatt's birthday, Harley does not want to break his heart. Meanwhile, Aidan is looking to become friends with Ethan, but after placing Aidan on the "dead-to-Diaz" list for what he did to Harley, Ethan is noncommittal to the friendship. Also, Harley is creating and testing a heart-monitor-based lie detector while not solving Georgie and Wyatt's problems, wanting to know who has stolen Valentine's Day candy she received as a present from Abuela. She eventually finds out it was Daphne, and the youngest Diaz finds herself trying to deliver Georgie's news to Wyatt, as well as telling Aidan he is truly "dead to Diaz". Despite Daphne's attempt, Georgie ends up telling Wyatt she is breaking up with him, only to discover that he already did that with her, when he was having laser eye surgery and wanted to see other people; Georgie misunderstood the message. Guest stars: Joshua Bassett as Aidan, Adam Hochstetter as Wyatt Absent: Nicolas Bechtel as Lewie Diaz, Malachi Barton as Beast Diaz, Cerina Vincent as Suzy Diaz
44	7	"Stuck with Horrible Helpers"	David Kendall	Erika Kaestle & Patrick McCarthy	March 16, 2018	308	0.99
Harley wants to win a science contest, but Mr. Delorco is considering another student for it, so she needs to prove to him she belongs there. She develops a robot intended to help with her teacher's mundane tasks and allows Lewie and Beast to help her program it. Afterward, she makes the twins her assistants at the slushy shack, something they have been longing for. When Harley shows Mr. Delorco her robot and demonstrates what it does, disaster happens, leading her to blame Lewie and Beast for costing her a spot in the contest and to fire them from the slushy shack. Seeing how much they hurt their sister, the twins decide to exhibit many of her inventions in Mr. Delorco's classroom, to show him that Harley is worthy of being in the contest. When Harley sees the display, she tries avoiding another disaster, assuming her brothers would cause further problems. Despite things going awry again, Mr. Delorco sees Harley's inventions more than qualify her to be in the contest. Meanwhile, Georgie and Tom buy a game set which includes a pool table the children passed on to visit Abuela for Christmas, but they find out the product is defective. Georgie works at getting her father angry enough to deal with the man who sold it to them and refused to give them their money back. Later, after Harley forgives the twins and decides to make them assistants again at the slushy shack, they find out that their father's store has been robbed. Guest stars: Peter Breitmayer as Mr. Delorco, Jeremy Guskin as Eddie Absent: Isaak Presley as Ethan Diaz, Ariana Greenblatt as Daphne Diaz, Cerina Vincent as Suzy Diaz
45	8	"Stuck in a Mysterious Robbery"	Leslie Kolins Small	David McHugh & Matt Flanagan	March 23, 2018	309	1.13
Harley organizes an investigation into the robbery of her father's Bait and Bite store and has Ethan, Daphne, Lewie and Beast helping. They name three suspects—Rachel's ex-boyfriend Cuff, fisherman Colt Bailey, and Rod, the owner of a competing store. Cuff and Colt are later cleared, but Suzy and Tom are added as Harley questions their stories about what happened to the store's security recorder, which were inconsistent. Harley recalls another camera in the store, one installed on her slushy machine, and after viewing what it caught, she finds out Suzy and Tom hid the security recorder. She also finds out, from Daphne, that it is stashed in their bedroom closet, which is locked to the children. Harley and her siblings come up with a plan to get the closet key from their parents so Harley can get hold of the security recorder. Once she does and watches the footage, she realizes she was responsible for the robbery due to accidentally leaving the store's back door unlocked. Later, the Diaz family is informed by Rod, from the competing store, that the thieves were caught, as they attempted to rob his store as well. Guest stars: Brett Pierce as Cuff, Morgan West as Colt Bailey, Clint Culp as Rod Absent: Kayla Maisonet as Georgie Diaz
46	9	"Stuck in a Besties Battle"	Jon Rosenbaum	Lance Whinery	March 30, 2018	310	1.06
Abuela visits, and Harley fears the "curse" will resurface, as something always goes wrong when Abuela sees her grandchildren, including fighting. Daphne and Georgie complain that Harley is Abuela's favorite from the extra hugs she is getting, so they set out to change that perception, but they upstage each other around Abuela, which later erupts into a fight between the two at a cycling class. Harley finds out about Ethan's spending time with Aidan and lying to her about it, but she becomes enraged after discovering Aidan knows a secret of hers, which had been kept between her and Ethan. As revenge, Harley decides to reveal Ethan's embarrassing secrets around Chloe. Abuela gets to the bottom of all the feuding and makes it clear she does not play favorites—she loves all her grandchildren equally. She also clears the myth about the "curse", which was about more than just the fighting among her grandchildren. Later, Harley and Ethan overhear Aidan talking to his father on the phone and understand he is feeling alone, so they invite him to their family game night. Guest stars: Olga Merediz as Abuela, Joshua Bassett as Aidan, Alana Baer as Chloe, Brandon Black as Greg Absent: Nicolas Bechtel as Lewie Diaz, Malachi Barton as Beast Diaz, Cerina Vincent as Suzy Diaz, Joe Nieves as Tom Diaz
47	10	"Stuck in Spring Break"	Jon Rosenbaum	David Baldy	April 6, 2018	316	1.22
The Diaz children want to spend their spring break on vacation rather than cleaning their father's Bait and Bite store. Tom is upset that a boat he is supposed to deliver down the coast to Sandy Bluffs is without a captain, which becomes an opportunity for the family to travel there. Harley promises her father a pass for the yacht club in Sandy Bluffs, claiming she knows a member. While she actually has no connections with that yacht club, she is later shocked to see a familiar face in Sandy Bluffs—Mr. Pillman, who gave the Diaz family trouble during their waterpark vacation, but who also happens to own the yacht club. Despite their differences, Mr. Pillman grants Harley and the rest of the Diaz family access to the club. Later, Suzy and Tom reveal that they are selling the Bait and Bite to Mr. Pillman, and the children are on board. After Tom signs the papers transferring ownership, a serious mishap at the hands of Daphne, Lewie and Beast angers Mr. Pillman, who reveals his plan to build another yacht club where the Bait and Bite is standing. As the Diaz family is ready to give up the Bait and Bite, Harley discovers that Mr. Pillman stole her Dry-Through invention from the waterpark and plans to sue him for patent infringement, unless he returns the Bait and Bite to her family. Guest stars: Tom Parker as Mr. Pillman, Kate Tomlinson as Hannah
48	11	"Stuck with a New Squad"	Mike Mariano	Allan Rice	April 13, 2018	311	0.88
When Georgie becomes distraught over being cut from the basketball team at school, Harley tries to find a way to cheer her up. After talking with Georgie's basketball coach, Harley manages to get Georgie the role of the school's mascot, which ends up not being well-received by the students. The school's dance squad is impressed by Georgie's dance moves, however, and so is Harley, who encourages her to join the squad. Georgie's first practice with them for a pep rally, with other students watching, leads to stage fright and her wanting to be mascot again, but with that role now filled by someone else, Harley invents special glasses to help Georgie feel less nervous, as if she were performing in front of family. That backfires when the glasses fall off and break at the pep rally, so Harley is forced to go to desperate measures to take the focus off her sister. Her effort works in breaking Georgie's stage fright. Meanwhile, Suzy tries to be the fun parent for Lewie and Beast, who are depressed over not being able to go with their father to a monster truck rally. Guest stars: Audrey Moore as Coach Heller, Coryn Mabalot as Jo, Lance Lim as Kevin Casey Absent: Isaak Presley as Ethan Diaz, Ariana Greenblatt as Daphne Diaz, Joe Nieves as Tom Diaz
49	12	"Stuck with a Non-Diaz"	David Kendall	Erika Kaestle & Patrick McCarthy	June 26, 2018	312	0.78
Ethan hopes that Shane Coleman, the "zombie king", will view his horror film, and the Diaz family prepares a weekend premiere party for the occasion. As they begin planning, Harley and Ethan unexpectedly invite their neighbor Aidan to their house for the weekend, after his father bails on spending time with him. Harley sees it as an opportunity for Aidan to change his selfish ways by interacting with her family, but when they try to engage him in helping with the party preparation, it turns into a mess. The Diaz family scrambles to get everything set up in the backyard, but even after Shane shows up for the screening, Aidan's well-intentioned efforts cause havoc and the screening never takes place. Despite the disaster, Harley and Ethan are relieved when Shane later informs them that he liked the film, having received the DVD from Aidan, and that Ethan has potential as a director. The Diaz family, including Harley, has a change of heart about Aidan afterward, and they attend his final lacrosse game of the season, in place of his father. Guest stars: Joshua Bassett as Aidan, Curt Mega as Shane Coleman Absent: Ariana Greenblatt as Daphne Diaz
50	13	"Stuck in the Dark"	Jon Rosenbaum	David McHugh & Matt Flanagan	June 28, 2018	313	0.78
Harley is eager to see Neil deGrasse Tyson in Boston, but Daphne wants to have a sleepover. Despite Daphne being too young for such an occasion, Suzy leaves Harley in charge of the sleepover and will take her to Boston if there are no problems. The sleepover goes fine until Daphne tells Harley that she is afraid of the dark. To rid her sister of the phobia, Harley tries different techniques, including sleeping with her in her dollhouse. Nothing appears to work, and Harley is faced with missing the trip to Boston, until Daphne says it is okay for her to go. After checking on her sister one more time before leaving, Harley decides to stay home and spend more time with her, doing various activities in the dark. Meanwhile, Ethan starts a rock band with three young musical prodigies, but recruits his father and Bethany Peters as additional members. Guest stars: Lauren Pritchard as Bethany Peters, Callan Farris as Norman Absent: Kayla Maisonet as Georgie Diaz, Nicolas Bechtel as Lewie Diaz, Malachi Barton as Beast Diaz
51	14	"Stuck with No Escape"	Mike Mariano	Jessica Charles	July 3, 2018	315	0.84
Harley wonders why her siblings are out of sync, so she decides to get them back on track by simulating their most dreaded trip, Pilgrim Land, in the attic, locking them up there. Ethan, Daphne, Georgie, Lewie and Beast work to escape by solving various clues about their experiences as a family. When they finally make it out of the attic, they are faced with a similar escape game put together by Suzy and Tom, which confines the children to the bedroom floor of their house. To avoid a real trip to Pilgrim Land, Harley and her siblings solve more clues to gain access downstairs and find their parents before time runs out.
52	15	"Stuck Wrestling Feelings"	Aprill Winney	Bryan Larrivee	July 5, 2018	317	0.85
Harley accompanies Lewie and Beast to a wrestling convention, and their neighbor Aidan also comes along. The event winds up changing how Harley feels about Aidan, which Georgie is quick to point out to her. Harley starts to realize she is liking her obnoxious neighbor, and it drives her to avoid him, even at places of interest to her like the science museum. After Georgie informs Lewie and Beast about what is really going on, the twins get Harley and Aidan together, but it is short-lived. Eventually, after seeing why Lewie and Beast set them up, Harley decides to stop avoiding her neighbor and spend time with him. Meanwhile, Georgie and Suzy try to score some television time on a local morning news show, sporting dresses that Rachel designed in France. Guest stars: Joshua Bassett as Aidan, Geno Segers as The Businessman, Wayne T. Carr as Scott Wayne Absent: Isaak Presley as Ethan Diaz, Ariana Greenblatt as Daphne Diaz, Joe Nieves as Tom Diaz
53	16	"Stuck Without the Perfect Gift"	Mike Mariano	Erika Kaestle & Patrick McCarthy	July 10, 2018	318	0.70
Harley struggles to find the right gift for Aidan after he gives her one that turns out to be something she needed. To find out more about Aidan, she orchestrates a fake game show, with Ethan as host, and sees a common thread to Aidan's answers—his father, Charles Peters. With this in mind, Harley contacts Charles, who lives in Tokyo, and asks him to come to Marshport to see his son. The surprise visit distresses Aidan, because he has not seen his father in months and was reluctant to ask him to come himself. Still, Aidan tells Harley it is the best gift she could have given him. Later, after being with his father, Aidan tells Harley that he is going back with him to Tokyo, turning down an invitation to be her escort at her quinceañera. Though crushed about his leaving, Harley realizes she chose the perfect gift for Aidan in reuniting him with Charles. Meanwhile, Daphne, Lewie and Beast work to make some money so they can go to laser tag with Tom, but in the process, they accidentally give away an irreplaceable plate that Suzy made. Guest stars: Joshua Bassett as Aidan, Jeremy John Wells as Charles Absent: Kayla Maisonet as Georgie Diaz, Cerina Vincent as Suzy Diaz
54	17	"Stuck in Diaz Court"	Julian Petrillo	Linda Videtti Figueiredo	July 12, 2018	319	0.77
The Diaz family car is damaged, from being crashed into the garage, and Suzy and Tom call a family meeting to find out which of their children is the culprit. Four of them have an alibi, but Harley and Ethan, who risk being put on lockdown, cannot back up their stories with witnesses, so they are put on trial in Diaz court. Things start looking grim for Harley's case as the testimony unfolds, and she feels compelled to confess her guilt, until evidence surfaces about a recording Ethan made and then erased. Harley later finds out that the recording was backed up on Tom's laptop and discovers it to be a video invitation for her quinceañera. After viewing some of the video, she could not hold Ethan responsible for the car damage and decides to take the blame, but Suzy and Tom share news they got from their mechanic about the car. It turns out none of the children are responsible, since the damage was caused by a malfunctioning transmission. Guest star: Lauren Pritchard as Bethany Peters
55	18	"Stuck in Dad's Birthday"	Leslie Kolins Small	David McHugh & Matt Flanagan	July 17, 2018	320	0.64
For Tom's birthday, the rest of the Diaz family takes care of his responsibilities so he can enjoy his special day without worry. Suzy and Ethan handle things at the Bait and Bite, while everyone else tackles cleaning out the garage, determined by Harley's mañana wheel. As the children start on the garage, Tom shares messages from an old answering machine, dating back to Harley's birth. One of them, from a radio station, revealed he had won a Crimson Coupe car associated with his favorite television series, Crimson Justice. As Tom had not heard the message before, he could not claim the car. Deciding it would be a wonderful present for their father, Harley and Georgie go to the radio station which gave away the Coupe. They are unable to get information directly from the station, so they find a way to broadcast their inquiry about the car's winner. They get a call from a woman, whose son won the car but later abandoned it; she offers $300 for it and the girls buy it. Though the Coupe breaks down and Tom needs to rescue the girls, he appreciates the gift. Meanwhile, Suzy and Ethan were intending to have the Bait and Bite closed for the day, but still end up dealing with a lot of customers. Guest stars: Shane Hartline as Chaz, Brenda Ballard as Ruby, Paul Goetz as Customer, Nick Youssef as Crimson Coupe Absent: Nicolas Bechtel as Lewie Diaz, Malachi Barton as Beast Diaz
56	19	"Stuck in a Fake Out"	Erika Kaestle	Linda Videtti Figueiredo	July 19, 2018	321	0.73
To keep her best friend from missing her quinceañera, Harley helps Ellie with a school project. Ellie is shooting a video about Harley as an inventor, but in doing so, Harley notices her struggle with keeping the camera focused on her. Harley attempts to correct Ellie's problem and has Georgie fill in for her in the video. Ellie gains confidence and wants to be the videographer at Harley's quinceañera, but Harley feels uneasy letting her take on that responsibility, so she puts together a "fake-ceañera" to give her some more practice. Harley is actually trying to get Ellie out of doing the video for her big day altogether, knowing she will mess up, but Ellie eventually finds out and is hurt that her best friend has no faith in her. When Harley apologizes, she finds out Ellie wants to spend the special day with her in front of the camera instead of behind it. Meanwhile, Suzy and Tom try to decide what dessert to serve at Harley's quinceañera, while Ethan unfoils the identity of Daphne, Lewie and Beast's nemeses, who are bullying them to pay $10. Guest star: Lulu Lambros as Ellie Peters
57	20	"Stuck in Harley's Quinceañera"	David Kendall	Linda Videtti Figueiredo	July 23, 2018	314	0.92
Harley wakes up late the morning before her quinceañera, and discovers the rest of her family and Ellie are already planning for it without her. Ethan and Tom go to pick up Harley's dress, but after stopping at a new ice cream shop and noticing their car towed away afterward, they miss their appointment and end up getting the wrong dress. Georgie and Suzy set up at the venue for the quinceañera but struggle with putting the science-themed decorations together. Harley, meanwhile, spends the last day of her childhood completing her "Buck-Kid" list, and Daphne, Lewie and Beast help her through the list, except one of her goals leads to her getting stained, two hours before the event. The family gets a surprise, and some relief, when Rachel comes home; she helps Harley through her crisis and directs Ethan and Tom to the correct dress. Things start going more smoothly until Harley realizes the box containing her grand entrance plans fails to reach the venue. She surprises her family with her improvised acrobatic entrance, and despite the unexpected, Harley enjoys her quinceañera... and one more twist: Aidan's return. Special guest star: Ronni Hawk as Rachel Diaz Guest stars: Lulu Lambros as Ellie Peters, Joshua Bassett as Aidan, Kristin Dattilo as Sales Lady

== Stuck in the Store (2016) ==
- Stuck in the Store is a Stuck in the Middle special that aired on Disney Channel on December 16, 2016, consisting of six 2–4-minute shorts.

No.	Title	Original release date	Prod. code
1	"Operation: Mega Mart"	December 16, 2016	001
As the Diaz family prepares to shop at Mega Mart, its store manager Rodney is keeping an eye on them as they have two strikes against them for past mischief. With a third strike, he can ban the family from the store and highlight them on the store's wall of shame. If the children can avoid getting into trouble, Suzy and Tom are promising each of them a family-sized pizza. Harley develops a way to communicate with her siblings around the store, using Tom's old cell phones which also serve as a source for live-streaming.
2	"Operation: Discount"	December 16, 2016	002
Ethan disguises himself as a Mega Mart employee named Boris and helps an old lady carry a giant teddy bear for her grandniece's birthday party. Meanwhile, Lewie and Beast are sampling some barbecue chicken tenders and each decide to sample one for Ethan. The twins get busted by Rodney for oversampling. Absent: Ronni Hawk as Rachel Diaz, Ariana Greenblatt as Daphne Diaz, Kayla Maisonet as Georgie Diaz
3	"Operation: Cake"	December 16, 2016	003
Georgie tries an unsuccessful move to get lettuce for Harley which ends with her crashing into a box of pillows. Daphne sees a huge cake and decides to take ownership by sitting on it as part of her "You butt it, you buy it." Rodney gets hold of both Georgie and Daphne. Absent: Ronni Hawk as Rachel Diaz, Nicolas Bechtel as Lewie Diaz, Malachi Barton as Beast Diaz, Cerina Vincent as Suzy Diaz, Joe Nieves as Tom Diaz
4	"Operation: Fame"	December 16, 2016	004
Rachel uses a store camera to broadcast herself across Mega Mart and to The Squad. Rodney sees her and attempts to grab the camera from her, but the camera breaks and Rodney rips his pants. It is the third strike Rodney was looking for to ban the Diaz family from Mega Mart. Absent: Isaak Presley as Ethan Diaz, Ariana Greenblatt as Daphne Diaz, Kayla Maisonet as Georgie Diaz, Nicolas Bechtel as Lewie Diaz, Malachi Barton as Beast Diaz
5	"Operation: Break Out"	December 16, 2016	005
Harley and Ethan, as Boris, organize an attempt to get their siblings out of confinement. They distract Rodney briefly, but he spots the Diaz children trying to escape.
6	"Operation: Escape"	December 16, 2016	006
Harley makes one last effort to divert Rodney's attention so the entire family can leave the store unscathed. Rodney catches up to them though and bans them. When Suzy confronts him about his customer relations, pointing out she was watching the children's live streams as they were getting caught, Rodney retracts his ban. Harley and her siblings celebrate, only to realize they will not be getting any pizza because Suzy reminded them that she watched their live streams. This disappoints the children and Tom.
