= The Nana Project =

2023 film directed by Robin Givens

- Poster
- Directed by: Robin Givens
- Screenplay by: Eric Ulloa
- Produced by: Carl Moellenberg; Anthony Del Negro
- Starring: Mercedes Ruehl; Nolan Gould; Will Peltz
- Cinematography: Hilton Goring
- Edited by: Andrew Keenan-Bolger; Nick Everhart
- Music by: Caleb Damschroder
- Production companies: Dominion Pictures; Stargazer Films
- Distributed by: Gravitas Ventures
- Release dates: September 14, 2023 (SOHO International Film Festival); September 10, 2024
- Running time: 84 minutes
- Country: United States
- Language: English

The Nana Project is a 2023 American mockumentary comedy film directed by Robin Givens from a screenplay by Eric Ulloa (in his narrative feature writing debut), with additional writing by Carl Moellenberg and Anthony Del Negro, the film's producers. Set at the Timeless Acres Retirement Home, the film follows a documentary crew who develop an interest in one of its star residents—feisty chess master Helen “Nana” Lewis (Mercedes Ruehl). The film stars Ruehl with an ensemble cast that includes Nicky Whelan, Morgan Fairchild, Tony Todd, Charlene Tilton, Beth Broderick, Margaret Avery, Sierra McCormick, Katie Sarife, Gina Hiraizumi, Nolan Gould and Will Peltz.

It premiered as the opening night film of the SOHO International Film Festival on September 14, 2023, and was released on VOD, Blu-ray and DVD on September 10, 2024, by Gravitas Ventures.

== Cast ==
- Mercedes Ruehl as Helen “Nana” Lewis
- Nicky Whelan as Jennifer
- Morgan Fairchild as Francesca
- Tony Todd as Jack
- Charlene Tilton as Esther
- Carlos Sanz as Luis Amarillo
- Beth Broderick as Kitty
- Margaret Avery as Gladys
- Sierra McCormick as Sarah
- Katie Sarife as Linda Jenkins
- Gina Hiraizumi as Lisa Chen
- Christina Moore as Cindy Trublen
- Nolan Gould as Andrew
- Will Peltz as Cody
- Mike Manning as Todd Stevens

== Production ==
=== Development and casting ===
On December 21, 2021, it was reported that Mercedes Ruehl will star in the mockumentary-style comedy directed by Robin Givens. On May 12, 2022, Nicky Whelan, Morgan Fairchild, Tony Todd, Charlene Tilton, Beth Broderick, Margaret Avery, Sierra McCormick, Katie Sarife, Gina Hiraizumi, Nolan Gould, Will Peltz, Olivia d’Abo, Eddie Steeples, and Mike Manning have joined the cast.

=== Filming ===
Filming began in Louisville, Kentucky from May 18. A number of local background actors were hired to work on location: Julie Engelhardt, Lincoln Crum, Carlisle Baker, Mark Neff, Sally Johnson, Ed Hoben, Barbie Mueller, Kimberley Gant, Kathleen Ashcraft, Raydonna Guy, and Terri Weber.

== Release ==
The film premiered as the opening night film of the SOHO International Film Festival in New York City on September 14, 2023. Some of the cast was able to attend the screening due to the producers having signed an interim agreement that would allow them to promote the film during the 2023 SAG-AFTRA strike. On May 14, 2024, Gravitas Ventures acquired the US distribution rights to the film and set it for a VOD and physical home media release on September 10, 2024.
