= Youth & Consequences =

2018 American comedy drama streaming television series

- Genre: Comedy drama
- Created by: Jason Ubaldi
- Written by: Jason Ubaldi
- Starring: Anna Akana; Sean Grandillo; Katie Sarife; Sophie Reynolds; Kara Royster; Savannah Jayde; Piper Curda
- Composers: WAZ; Jamie Jackson; Al Sgro
- Country of origin: United States
- Original language: English
- No. of seasons: 1
- No. of episodes: 8

Production
- Executive producers: Jesse Hara; Tom Spriggs; Anna Akana; Jason Ubaldi; Nicholas Pepper; Mark Gordon; Blair Singer; Wendy Stanzler (ep. 1 & 2)
- Cinematography: John Wakayama Carey
- Camera setup: Single-camera
- Running time: 26–34 minutes
- Production company: The Mark Gordon Company

Original release
- Network: YouTube Red
- Release: March 7, 2018

Youth & Consequences is an American comedy-drama streaming television series created by Jason Ubaldi and starring Anna Akana, Sean Grandillo, and Piper Curda. It premiered on March 7, 2018, on YouTube Red. Executive producers included Ubaldi and Akana, alongside Mark Gordon, Nick Pepper, Blair Singer, Tom Spriggs, and Jesse Hara. On June 30, 2018, it was confirmed that the series would not return for a second season.

== Premise ==
Youth & Consequences follows "powerful teen trendsetter Farrah Cutney, who is the queen of Central Rochester High struggling to keep her place in the firmament of power as rivals rise all around her".

== Cast and characters ==
=== Main ===
- Anna Akana as Farrah Cutney
- Sean Grandillo as Colin Cowher
- Katie Sarife as Sara Hurley
- Sophie Reynolds as Plain Jane
- Kara Royster as Jayne
- Savannah Jayde as Stacey Moorehead
- Piper Curda as Grace Ho

=== Recurring ===
- Mike Gray as Ilo Hampton
- Moses Storm as Hook
- Marcia Cross as Principal Cowher
- Sumalee Montano as Kate Cutney
- Brando White as Will
- Ashley Parker as Hannah
- Karan Brar as Dipankar Gosh
- Abigail Snarr as Kendra
- Melanie Nelson as Superintendent Moorehead
- Allie Rae Treharne as Hope
- Jennifer Grzybowski as Lynn
- Austin Grant as Tripp
- Cary Elwes as Joel Cutney
- Gabriel Eckert as Gabe
- Tristan B. Johnson as Jack
- Darien Willardson as Brandon Swain

== Episodes ==
No.	Title	Directed by	Written by	Original release date
1	"The Hanging Chadwick: Part 1"	Wendey Stanzler	Jason Ubaldi	March 7, 2018
2	"The Hanging Chadwick: Part 2"	Wendey Stanzler	Jason Ubaldi	March 7, 2018
3	"Gender Fluidity"	Anya Adams	Jason Ubaldi	March 7, 2018
4	"Wednesday Night Lights"	Anya Adams	Jason Ubaldi	March 7, 2018
5	"Narc-ish"	Tessa Hoffe	Jason Ubaldi	March 7, 2018
6	"Tiger Strong"	Tessa Hoffe	Jason Ubaldi	March 7, 2018
7	"Crotch Riot"	Kimberly McCullough	Jason Ubaldi	March 7, 2018
8	"The Fall From Grace"	Kimberly McCullough	Jason Ubaldi	March 7, 2018

== Production ==
=== Development ===
On October 18, 2017, it was announced that YouTube had given the production a series order to consist of a first season of eight half hour episodes. Anna Akana and Jason Ubaldi began developing the series with YouTube in January 2017 through its partnership with the Sundance Institute. Ubaldi created and wrote the series, with Akana serving as an executive producer. The Mark Gordon Company is producing the show, with Gordon signed on to executive produce alongside Nick Pepper, Blair Singer, Tom Spriggs, and Jesse Hara. Singer will serve as the series' showrunner and Wendey Stanzler is set to direct the pilot episode. On June 30, 2018, series lead Anna Akana confirmed on her Twitter account that the series would not return for a second season.

=== Casting ===
Alongside the initial series announcement, it was reported that Akana would play the series' lead role of Farrah Cutney. Other actors set for the main cast include Sean Grandillo, Katie Sarife, Kara Royster, Sophie Reynolds, Piper Curda, and Savannah Jayde. It was also announced that Marcia Cross would join the cast in a recurring capacity and Cary Elwes would appear in a guest role. On December 19, 2017, it was announced that Moses Storm had joined the series in the recurring role of Hook.

=== Filming ===
Production for the first season took place in Ogden, Utah between August and September 2017. Scenes taking place at school were filmed at Ogden High School. It was reported that if further seasons of the show were produced then filming would occur at the school during summer months only.

The Ogden School District received $67,500 for letting the production film at Ogden High School. The payment was set to be split, with $37,500 going to the district and the rest going directly to the high school.

=== Music ===
The series' score was composed by husband-wife composing duo Waz and Jamie Jackson, known as WAZ-Jackson. The pair spent three months working on the show from October to December 2017. The composers have mentioned how showrunner Jason Ubaldi managed to create characters with multiple dimensions. Wanting to reflect that, Waz and Jackson decided to write the score in such a manner as to support all of those layers through an array of different musical genres. Given that much of the show takes place in a high school, they used the driving energy of a marching band drumline to keep the momentum going from scene to scene. They also used modern electronic percussion, vibes, and mellotron to keep the show's sound youthful and quirky. When heartfelt moments would occur in the storyline, they were supported by ethereal piano, synth, and electric guitar pieces. Unlike other series that WAZ-Jackson have scored, Youth & Consequences was ordered straight-to-series. This meant that while they were developing the overall musical sound for the show in the pilot episode, they were also sent episodes 102 and 103 as well. Given that the composing process for the show was moving at such a rapid pace the duo brought Al Sgro on board to help with the score.

== Release ==
=== Marketing ===
On January 13, 2018, the series' producers appeared at the annual Television Critics Association's winter press tour during a panel discussion of the show. Akana was reported as having said, "I think the thing that drew me to the script the most was that her motivations to the audience are never really clear. Jason did a beautiful job of using the Mean Girls construct for you to kind of wonder, 'Is she self-serving or is she actually serving an agenda that's for other people?' I think that's the beauty of the complexity in a high school story — is that people's motivations aren't necessarily purely selfish or purely for someone else."

On February 7, 2018, YouTube released the first clip from the series and a collection of still images. A few days later on February 12, the series' first teaser trailer was released and a few days after that YouTube released the full-length trailer and announced a premiere date of March 7, 2018.

=== Premiere ===
On February 28, 2018, the series held a screening event in Los Angeles, California.

== Reception ==
=== Critical response ===
In a positive review, Common Sense Media's Joyce Slaton praised the series saying, "Circling around a power-hungry school clique, this teen dramedy is intriguing, mean-spirited and entertaining all at once." She went on to say, "The unkindness and less-than-positive messages may convince parents to keep this one on the do-not-watch list. But as a sort of dark high school-set Dangerous Liaisons, Youth & Consequences hits the mark and may soon make converts of new viewers. "

=== Awards and nominations ===
Year	Award	Category	Nominee(s)	Result	Ref.
2018	Streamy Awards	Acting in a Drama	Anna Akana	Won	
2018	Streamy Awards	Drama Series	Youth & Consequences	Nominated	
2019	Daytime Emmy Awards	Outstanding Digital Drama Series	Youth & Consequences	Nominated	
