= Sophie Reynolds =

American actress (born 1999)

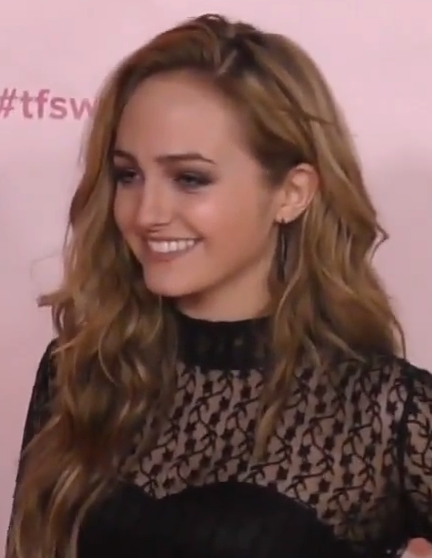
- Reynolds in 2016
- Born: Sophie Anne Reynoldson; April 2, 1999 (age 27); Portland, Oregon, U.S.
- Education: University of California, Los Angeles
- Occupation: Actress
- Years active: 2002–present
- Notable work: Gamer's Guide to Pretty Much Everything; L.A.'s Finest; Big Hero 6: The Series

Sophie Anne Reynoldson, known professionally as Sophie Reynolds (born April 2, 1999) is an American actress. She is best known for her roles as Ashley Parker in Gamer's Guide to Pretty Much Everything and Isabel McKenna on L.A.'s Finest.

== Life and career ==
Sophie Anne Reynoldson, professionally known as Sophie Reynolds, was born on April 2, 1999, in Portland, Oregon. She was raised in Vancouver, Washington, a suburb of Portland, Oregon. Reynoldson has an older brother named Owen. At the age of 15, her family relocated to Los Angeles, California.

Reynolds started dancing at the age of three. She trained in ballet, jazz, contemporary, hip hop and tap dance. At the suggestion of her dance teachers, Sophie tried acting to expand her palate, eventually falling in love with the craft.

She gained prominence through her role as Ashley Parker in the Disney XD series Gamer's Guide to Pretty Much Everything. In 2015, she starred in Mostly Ghostly: One Night in Doom House, an adaptation of a book by R.L. Stine. In 2017, she joined the cast of Anna Akana's YouTube Red series Youth & Consequences. In 2019, she played the character of Isabel McKenna in the show L.A.'s Finest.

Reynolds graduated from University of California, Los Angeles and joined Big Beach Films to pursue a career in filmmaking.

== Filmography ==
=== Film ===
Year	Title	Role	Notes
2014	9	Petra	Short film Credited as Sophie Reynoldson
2014	Finding Oblivion	Dancer	Credited as Sophie Reynoldson
2014	Mostly Ghostly: One Night in Doom House	Cammie Cahill	Direct-to-video

=== Television ===
Year	Title	Role	Notes
2015–2017	Gamer's Guide to Pretty Much Everything	Ashley Parker	Main role
2018–2021	Big Hero 6: The Series	Juniper	Voice role; 3 episodes
2018	Youth & Consequences	Plain Jane	Miniseries; Main role
2019	Prince of Peoria	Ryan Gibson	Episode: "Robot Wars"
2019	The Lion Guard	Tazama	Voice role Episode: "Return to the Pride Lands"
2019-2020	L.A.'s Finest	Isabel McKenna	Main role
2023	American Born Chinese	Ruby	4 episodes
