= Annabelle Comes Home =

2019 American supernatural horror film

- Theatrical release poster
- Directed by: Gary Dauberman
- Screenplay by: Gary Dauberman
- Story by: James Wan; Gary Dauberman
- Produced by: James Wan; Peter Safran
- Starring: Mckenna Grace; Madison Iseman; Katie Sarife; Vera Farmiga; Patrick Wilson
- Cinematography: Michael Burgess
- Edited by: Kirk M. Morri
- Music by: Joseph Bishara
- Production companies: New Line Cinema; Atomic Monster; The Safran Company
- Distributed by: Warner Bros. Pictures
- Release date: June 26, 2019
- Running time: 106 minutes
- Country: United States
- Language: English
- Budget: $27–32 million
- Box office: $231.3 million

Annabelle Comes Home is a 2019 American supernatural horror film written and directed by Gary Dauberman, in his directorial debut, from a story by Dauberman and James Wan, who also served as producer with Peter Safran. It serves as a sequel to Annabelle (2014) and Annabelle: Creation (2017), the third installment in the Annabelle film series, and the sixth installment in The Conjuring Universe franchise. The film stars Mckenna Grace, Madison Iseman, and Katie Sarife, along with Vera Farmiga and Patrick Wilson, who reprise their roles as Ed and Lorraine Warren.

In early April 2018, Warner Bros. Pictures announced that a then-untitled film in The Conjuring Universe franchise would be released on July 3, 2019. Later that month, it was announced that the film would be another installment in the Annabelle series, with Dauberman signed on to write and direct the film in his directorial debut, based on a story treatment written by Dauberman and Wan. Principal photography had begun by mid-October and was finished in December 2018 in Los Angeles.

Annabelle Comes Home was theatrically released in the United States on June 26, 2019, by Warner Bros. Pictures and New Line Cinema. It grossed $231.3 million worldwide and received mixed reviews from critics.

== Plot ==
Demonologists Ed and Lorraine Warren confiscate the demonic Annabelle doll from nurses Debbie and Camilla. During the drive home, the doll summons spirits that attack Ed. To contain its evil influence, the Warrens place Annabelle inside a sacred glass case in their artifacts room, with the assistance of Father Gordon.

One year later, the Warrens arrange for Mary Ellen to babysit their daughter, Judy, while they leave overnight to investigate a case. At school, Judy notices the ghostly figure of a priest following her. With her birthday approaching, she attempts to invite her classmates to the celebration, but they reject her because they consider her a freak due to her parents' work as paranormal investigators. Feeling sorry for Judy, Mary Ellen decides to organize an early birthday celebration for her. Meanwhile, Mary Ellen's friend Daniela arrives at the Warrens' home uninvited. She has secretly come to contact the spirit of her deceased father and apologize for the car accident that killed him, an incident for which she blames herself despite not actually being at fault. Daniela sneaks into the artifacts room, touches several of the haunted objects, and eventually opens Annabelle's glass case and picks up the doll, releasing the demon trapped inside. The demon subsequently awakens other malevolent spirits, including the Ferryman, the Bride, the haunted Feeley Meeley board game, and the Black Shuck, unleashing chaos throughout the house.

Meanwhile, Mary Ellen's romantic interest, Bob Palmeri, arrives at the house but is attacked by the Black Shuck. Judy and Mary Ellen encounter other supernatural entities as the haunting intensifies. Daniela sneaks back inside to return the artifacts room keys but becomes trapped and is tormented by the haunted objects. Upstairs, Mary Ellen is pursued by the Ferryman, whose previous victim bears a striking resemblance to her. She manages to escape and rushes to Judy's bedroom, where the young girl is being attacked by Annabelle and the demon. The girls answer the telephone, believing Lorraine is calling, but the voice on the other end instructs them to offer Annabelle a soul. Judy and Mary Ellen subsequently enter the artifacts room, where they find Daniela and rescue her.

Judy explains that they must return Annabelle to her glass case to allow the other spirits to rest. Meanwhile, Bob attempts to protect Judy from the Black Shuck while she retrieves Mary Ellen's asthma inhaler. Daniela becomes possessed by the Bride. Judy and Mary Ellen search for Annabelle, aided by the ghostly priest who has been following Judy and appears to be protecting her. Their search leads them to the Ferryman, who has taken the doll and hidden it inside a locked closet. Judy discovers that the key to the closet is inside the Feeley Meeley board game, allowing Mary Ellen to enter and retrieve Annabelle. However, returning the doll to the artifacts room proves difficult, as hands emerge from the Feeley Meeley board game and grab at them while the possessed Daniela attacks. Judy manages to immobilize Daniela by projecting Ed's recorded footage of the Bride's exorcism onto her, temporarily freeing her from the Bride's influence. Judy and Mary Ellen then carry Annabelle back to the artifacts room and place her inside the glass case. However, the demon uses telekinetic force to prevent them from closing the door. Daniela arrives to help them, and with her assistance, they finally manage to shut the case. Daniela also has the key needed to lock it securely. Once the door is locked, the supernatural disturbances cease.

The following morning, Ed and Lorraine return home. At Judy's birthday party, all her classmates arrive, finally allowing her to celebrate with the friends she had hoped to invite. Later, Lorraine accompanies Daniela to the artifacts room, where Daniela apologizes for her actions. Lorraine then comforts her by conveying a reassuring message from her deceased father, helping Daniela find peace and forgive herself.

== Cast ==
- Mckenna Grace as Judy Warren
- Madison Iseman as Mary Ellen
- Katie Sarife as Daniela Rios
- Vera Farmiga as Lorraine Warren
- Patrick Wilson as Ed Warren
- Michael Cimino as Bob Palmeri
- Samara Lee as Bee
- Steve Coulter as Father Gordon
- Luca Luhan as Anthony Rios
- Douglas Tait as werewolf
- Alexander Ward as demon
- Gary-7 as ghostly priest

== Production ==
In early April 2018, Warner Bros. announced that a then-untitled film in the Conjuring Universe franchise would be released on July 3, 2019. Later that month, it was announced that the film would be another installment in the Annabelle series, with Gary Dauberman signed on to write and direct the film in his directorial debut, based on a story treatment written by Dauberman and James Wan. Wan and Peter Safran co-produced the project. During the 2018 San Diego Comic-Con, Wan and Safran revealed the film's events would take place after Annabelle and would focus on the doll after she had been placed in a glass case in the Warrens' museum. Dauberman later confirmed this, stating that the film would take place shortly after the beginning of The Conjuring where the titular character is introduced but also before many of the events of the first installment.

In September 2018, Mckenna Grace was cast in the film as Judy Warren, the Warrens' 10-year-old daughter (replacing Sterling Jerins, who played Judy Warren in The Conjuring and The Conjuring 2), and Madison Iseman as one of Judy's teenage babysitters. By October, Katie Sarife had joined the cast. That same month, it was announced Patrick Wilson and Vera Farmiga would reprise their roles as Ed and Lorraine Warren.

Principal photography had begun by mid-October in Los Angeles, with Michael Burgess serving as cinematographer. On December 7, Wilson announced that he had finished filming his scenes. A week later, filming officially concluded. In February 2019, Joseph Bishara—who composed the scores for The Conjuring, Annabelle, The Conjuring 2, and The Curse of La Llorona—was revealed to be scoring Annabelle Comes Home. On March 30, 2019, Kirk M. Morri was announced as the film's editor.

== Release ==
Annabelle Comes Home was theatrically released in the United States on June 26, 2019, by Warner Bros. Pictures and New Line Cinema. It was originally scheduled for release on July 3, 2019, but was later moved up to June 28 and then to June 26. The studio spent a total of $77 million promoting the film. The film is dedicated to Lorraine Warren, who died on April 18, 2019. Annabelle Comes Home was released on Digital HD on September 17, 2019, and on Blu-ray and DVD on October 8, 2019. It was released in a May 2022 Blu-ray collection with the other The Conjuring Universe movies.

== Reception ==
=== Box office ===
Annabelle Comes Home grossed $74.2 million in the United States and Canada, and $157.1 million in other territories, for a worldwide total of $231.3 million. Deadline Hollywood calculated the net profit of the film to be $64 million, when factoring together all expenses and revenues.

In the United States and Canada, the film was projected to gross $30–35 million from 3,587 theaters over its first five days. It made $7.2 million on its first day, a Wednesday, including $3.5 million from Tuesday night previews, the third-best total of any Conjuring installment. It then made $3.6 million on its second day of release for a two-day total of $10.8 million. It went on to debut to $20.3 million (a five-day total of $31.2 million), finishing second at the box office, behind holdover Toy Story 4, and marking the lowest start of any Conjuring film. In its second weekend, the film dropped 52% and grossed $9.8 million, finishing in fifth.

=== Critical response ===
On the review aggregator website Rotten Tomatoes, 64% of 209 critics' reviews are positive, with an average rating of 5.8/10. The website's consensus reads: "Fun for fans even if it isn't as frightening as some of its predecessors, Annabelle Comes Home suggests there's still some life left in the Conjuring franchise." Metacritic, which uses a weighted average, assigned the film a score of 53 out of 100, based on 35 critics, indicating "mixed or average" reviews. Audiences polled by CinemaScore gave the film an average grade of B− on an A+ to F scale, while those at PostTrak gave it an average 2.5 out of 5 stars, and a 42% "definite recommend".

=== Accolades ===
Two crew members were nominated for their work on the film. Leah Butler was nominated in the Best Costume Design category at the 2019 Fright Meter Awards. Gary Dauberman was nominated as Legion M Breakthrough Director at the 2019 Saturn Awards.

== Future ==
Prior to the release of the film in June 2019, Dauberman commented on the possibility of another film in the Annabelle series: "I didn't look at this process ... going, 'What other stuff can we absolutely spin-off into other movies?' [It's about] what works for this movie, and then if people seem to dig it, then we'll go from there." Safran also commented on the possibility, stating that they will continue to develop and create films "as long as [they] keep having original stories to tell. The moment that you start repeating yourself and really diluting the good will that exists out there, then it's the beginning of the end."
