= Katie Sarife =

American actress

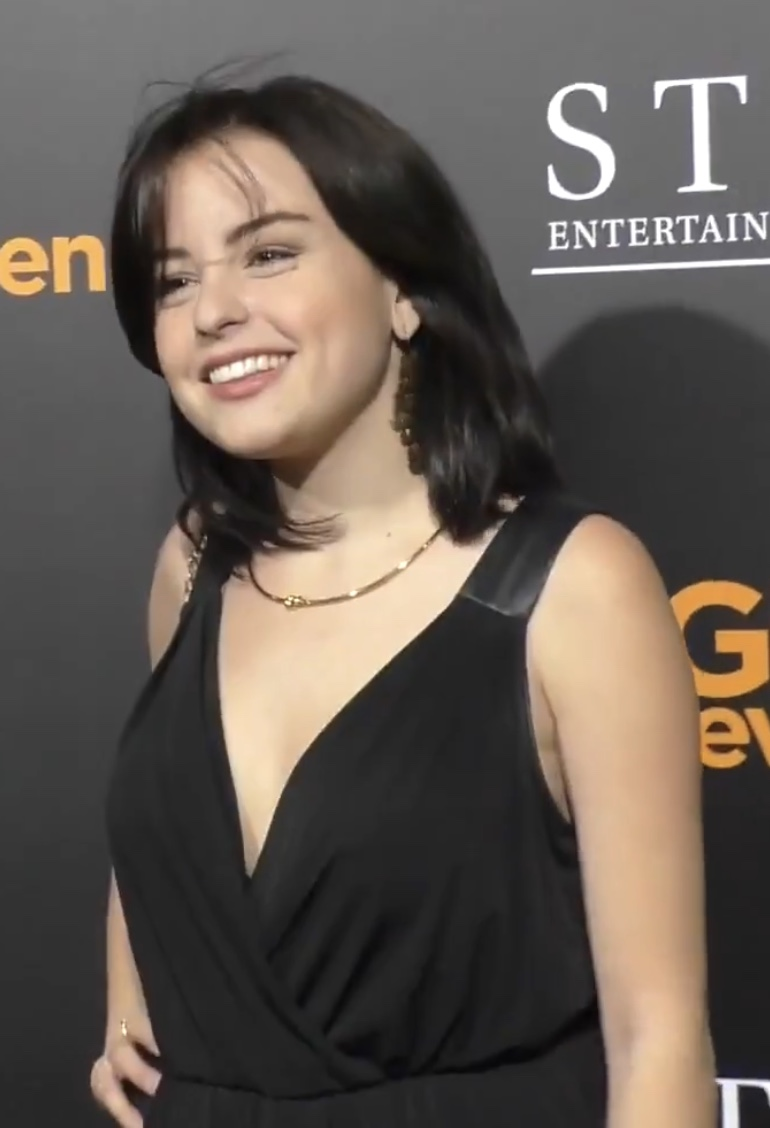
- Sarife in 2016
- Occupation: Actress
- Years active: 2011–present

Katie Sarife is an American actress. She is best known for playing Daniela Rios in the 2019 supernatural horror film Annabelle Comes Home.

== Career ==
She appeared in the episode Fan Fiction of the television series Supernatural and in Youth & Consequences. She played Soledad Fuentes in the 2015 NBC drama film The Curse of the Fuentes Women, starring Adan Canto and Christina Vidal. In 2019, she appeared as Daniela Rios in the supernatural horror film Annabelle Comes Home, directed by Gary Dauberman.

== Filmography ==
Year	Title	Role	Notes
2011	Teen Spirit	Selena	TV movie
2012	Abel's Field	Courtney	Film
2012	Sketchy		Episode: "MTV Presents: Weekend at Bernie's"
2012	Zombies and Cheerleaders	Eliza	TV pilot, unaired
2014	Supernatural	Marie	Episode: "Fan Fiction"
2015	Cleveland Abduction	Gina DeJesus	TV movie
2016	Girl Meets World	Marly Evans	Episodes: "Girl Meets High School: Part 1 ", "Girl Meets High School: Part 2 "
2016	Twisted Sisters	Maria	TV movie
2018	Youth & Consequences	Sara Hurley	8 episodes
2019	Annabelle Comes Home	Daniela Rios	
2022	So Cold the River	Kellyn Cage	
TBA	The Nana Project	Linda Jenkins	Post-production
