= Stuck in the Middle (TV series) =

American family comedy television series

- Genre: Family comedy
- Created by: Alison Brown
- Developed by: Alison Brown & Linda Videtti Figueiredo
- Starring: Jenna Ortega; Ronni Hawk; Isaak Presley; Ariana Greenblatt; Kayla Maisonet; Nicolas Bechtel; Malachi Barton; Cerina Vincent; Joe Nieves
- Theme music composer: Shridhar Solanki; Sidh Solanki; Maria Christensen
- Opening theme: "Stuck with You" by Sonus
- Composer: Kenneth Burgomaster
- Country of origin: United States
- Original language: English
- No. of seasons: 3
- No. of episodes: 57 (list of episodes)

Production
- Executive producer: Linda Videtti Figueiredo
- Producers: Cathy A. Cambria; David McHugh; Matt Flanagan
- Camera setup: Single-camera
- Running time: 21–24 minutes
- Production companies: International Donut Fund Productions; Horizon Productions

Original release
- Network: Disney Channel
- Release: February 14, 2016 – July 23, 2018

Stuck in the Middle is an American family comedy television series developed by Alison Brown and Linda Videtti Figueiredo and created by Brown that premiered on Disney Channel on February 14, 2016. The series focuses on Jenna Ortega as Harley Diaz, who invents many gadgets to deal with living in a large family. In addition to the regular episodes, the series also aired six shorts on December 16, 2016. After three seasons and 57 episodes, the series concluded with the episode "Stuck in Harley's Quinceañera" on July 23, 2018.

== Premise ==
Set in Massachusetts, in the fictional town of Marshport, the series tells the story of the Diaz family, specifically focusing on Harley, the middle of the seven children. Harley makes her way using her creativity to deal with living in a large family.

== Episodes ==
Season	Episodes	Originally released	
Season	Episodes	First released	Last released
1	17	February 14, 2016	July 22, 2016
2	20	February 3, 2017	October 27, 2017
3	20	December 8, 2017	July 23, 2018

== Cast and characters ==
=== Main ===
- Jenna Ortega as Harley Diaz, the middle of seven children and a young engineering prodigy. She is the central character in the series and views herself as an inventor. Some of her known inventions are the Conveyor Belt Table, the Slushinator, the Skate Kite, the Pick-Me-Up, and a snow machine. In "Stuck in the Sweet Seat", it is revealed it is her 13th birthday. A significant feature is that she tends to break the fourth wall to tell the viewers something about the situation.
- Ronni Hawk as Rachel Diaz (seasons 1–2; special guest, season 3), the oldest of the seven children and Harley's vain older sister. In "Stuck with No Rules", it is revealed that she is 16. In the third-season episode "Stuck with Rachel's Secret", Rachel leaves the family to attend an international college abroad program in Paris, France, while interning at a fashion company there. She returns in the series finale to help the family celebrate Harley's quinceañera.
- Isaak Presley as Ethan Diaz, Harley's oldest brother and her partner-in-crime; she refers to him as her best friend in the family. He is an aspiring musician and filmmaker. In "Stuck in the Sweet Seat", it is revealed that he is the third oldest of the seven, behind Rachel and Georgie.
- Ariana Greenblatt as Daphne Diaz, the youngest of the seven children and Harley's younger sister. She enjoys having tea time with her dolls and sleeps in her indoor dollhouse. In "Stuck with No Rules", it is revealed that Daphne can easily retaliate against anyone who takes things from her without getting her approval first.
- Kayla Maisonet as Georgie Diaz, one of Harley's older sisters and the second oldest of the seven as revealed in "Stuck in the Sweet Seat". She is a basketball player at her school and does an assortment of other sports.
- Nicolas Bechtel as Lewie Diaz, (Note: Malachi Barton is credited before Nicolas Bechtel in the Stuck in the Middle pilot episode, but Bechtel is later credited before Barton in all subsequent episodes starting with "Stuck in the Sweet Seat".) one of Harley's two younger brothers and Beast's twin. It is revealed in "Stuck in the Beast-Day Party" that Lewie is older than Beast by five minutes.
- Malachi Barton as Beast Diaz, one of Harley's two younger brothers and Lewie's twin.
- Cerina Vincent as Suzy Diaz, Harley's quirky mother who rarely has any alone time from her children and tends to spend it in the most unlikely places. Suzy is the one who usually punishes the kids from grounding them to even putting them on lockdown for higher violations.
- Joe Nieves as Tom Diaz, Harley's father who is the proprietor of a marina store called "Tom's Bait and Bite" which sells camping and fishing equipment. While he is a loving and caring father, he does tend to get upset when his kids let him down in any way.

=== Recurring ===
- Lauren Pritchard as Bethany Peters, a neighbor of the Diaz family who regularly criticizes Suzy and Tom's parenting of their children and is often annoyed with the antics of Lewie and Beast. She is a protective mother to her daughter Ellie whom she never lets have any fun as seen in "Stuck in the Block Party".
- Lulu Lambros as Ellie Peters, Bethany's daughter and Harley's best friend who is on the same basketball team as Georgie. In "Stuck in Harley's Comet", it is revealed that Ellie is afraid of heights, darkness, and birds. In "Stuck with a Bad Influence", Ellie is sent to a boarding school called Radistone Academy by her mother.
- Brett Pierce as Cuff (season 1), an irresponsible teenager who is Rachel's boyfriend and is disliked by Tom. When Cuff works briefly at "Tom's Bait and Bite" in "Stuck with My Sister's Boyfriend", his real first name is revealed to be Warren. While mainly in the first season, he also appears in the third-season episode "Stuck in a Mysterious Robbery", where it confirms that he and Rachel broke up.
- Joshua Bassett as Aidan (season 3), Bethany Peters' nephew and Ellie's cousin. He is an accomplished lacrosse player and has a tendency to annoy Harley. Aidan is staying with Bethany while his father is away. He becomes Harley's boyfriend in the episode "Stuck Wrestling Feelings" and they are still together when the series ends.

== Production ==
Production on the series began in November 2015. Disney Channel renewed Stuck in the Middle for a second season on June 15, 2016. The series was renewed for a third season by Disney Channel on August 31, 2017. On March 30, 2018, Disney Channel announced that the series would end after three seasons.

== Broadcast ==
A preview of Stuck in the Middle aired on Disney Channel on February 14, 2016. The series was later released on Watch Disney Channel and Disney Channel on Demand on February 15, 2016. The series began airing regularly on March 11, 2016. The first season concluded on July 22, 2016. The second season premiered on February 3, 2017, and concluded on October 27, 2017. The third season premiered on December 8, 2017, and concluded on July 23, 2018.

== Reception ==
=== Ratings ===
Viewership and ratings per season of Stuck in the Middle
Season	Episodes	First aired		Last aired		Avg. viewers (millions)
Season	Episodes	Date	Viewers (millions)	Date	Viewers (millions)	Avg. viewers (millions)
1	17	February 14, 2016	2.81	July 22, 2016	2.06	1.60
2	20	February 3, 2017	2.13	October 27, 2017	1.31	1.19
3	20	December 8, 2017	1.36	July 23, 2018	0.92	0.95

=== Awards and nominations ===
Year	Award	Category	Recipient	Result	Ref.
2016	Imagen Awards	Best Young Actor - Television	Jenna Ortega	Nominated	
2017	Young Artist Awards	Best Performance in a TV Series - Recurring Teen Actress	Lulu Lambros	Won	
2017	Kids' Choice Awards Mexico	Favorite International Program	Stuck in the Middle	Nominated	
2017	Kids' Choice Awards Colombia	Favorite International Program	Stuck in the Middle	Nominated	
2017	Kids' Choice Awards Argentina	Favorite International Program	Stuck in the Middle	Nominated	
2018	Imagen Awards	Best Young Actor - Television	Jenna Ortega	Won	
2018	Young Artist Awards	Best Performance in a TV Series - Recurring Teen Actress	Lulu Lambros	Nominated	
2019	Imagen Awards	Best Young Actor - Television	Jenna Ortega	Nominated	
