= Gamer's Guide to Pretty Much Everything =

American comedy television series

- Genre: Comedy
- Created by: Devin Bunje & Nick Stanton
- Starring: Cameron Boyce; Murray Wyatt Rundus; Felix Avitia; Sophie Reynolds
- Theme music composer: Joacim Persson; Johan Alkenäs
- Composer: Alan Ett
- Country of origin: United States
- Original language: English
- No. of seasons: 2
- No. of episodes: 37

Production
- Executive producers: Jim O'Doherty; Devin Bunje & Nick Stanton
- Cinematography: Thomas T. Eckelberry
- Camera setup: Multi-camera
- Running time: 21–23 minutes
- Production company: It's a Laugh Productions

Original release
- Network: Disney XD
- Release: July 22, 2015 – January 2, 2017

Gamer's Guide to Pretty Much Everything is an American comedy television series created by Devin Bunje and Nick Stanton that aired on Disney XD from July 22, 2015 to January 2, 2017. The series stars Cameron Boyce, Murray Wyatt Rundus, Felix Avitia, and Sophie Reynolds.

== Premise ==
Conor is a professional video game player who goes by the name of Kid Fury. When he breaks his thumb during the singles final round of the World Gaming Pro Championship, his sponsors withdraw every free item that he was given upon cutting all ties with him, and he starts school again. Upon befriending Wendell, Franklin, and Ashley, Conor plans to enlist their help for the teams part of the upcoming World Gaming Pro Championship.

== Cast ==
=== Main ===
- Cameron Boyce as Conor
- Murray Wyatt Rundus as Wendell
- Felix Avitia as Franklin
- Sophie Reynolds as Ashley

=== Recurring ===
- Joe Hursley as Mr. Spanks
- Paula Sorge as Principal Nordahl (season 1)
- Lauren Pritchard as Janice
- BooG!e as Billy (season 1)

== Production ==
On October 14, 2015, it was announced that production on the first season had been finished. On November 20, 2015, Disney XD renewed the series for a second season. On January 5, 2017, series co-creator and executive producer Devin Bunje and various members of the cast announced on social media that the series had been canceled.

== Episodes ==
=== Series overview ===
Season	Episodes	Originally released	
Season	Episodes	First released	Last released
1	21	July 22, 2015	March 23, 2016
2	16	July 18, 2016	January 2, 2017

=== Season 1 (2015–16) ===
No. overall	No. in season	Title	Directed by	Written by	Original release date	Prod. code	U.S. viewers (millions)
1	1	"Gamer's Guide to Pretty Much Everything"	Jon Rosenbaum	Devin Bunje & Nick Stanton	July 22, 2015	101	0.90
Guest stars: Joe Hursley as Mr. Spanks, Joseph Garrett as Stampy Cat
2	2	"The Gaming Club"	Jon Rosenbaum	Jim O'Doherty	July 29, 2015	103	0.54
Guest stars: Paula Sorge as Principal Nordahl, Lauren Pritchard as Janice, Matt Rife as Doyle O'Doyle
3	3	"The Puddin' Party"	Sean Lambert	Frank O. Wolff	August 5, 2015	104	0.63
Guest star: Alyvia Alyn Lind as Tina
4	4	"The Chair"	Jon Rosenbaum	Byron Kavanagh	August 12, 2015	102	0.48
The team receive a new chair. They do not know how to share it so they have a contest to determine who will get the new chair. The contest rule is nobody can play any video games. The last person standing wins. Ashley gets eliminated first after a video game event shows up at their school. Wendell gets eliminated when he has to choose between not playing video games and getting a kiss from a girl. Finally, Conor is eliminated after finding out about a glitch in a game he likes. It is later discovered that they were tricked by Franklin and all of those temptations that were impossible to ignore were him. Guest star: Paula Sorge as Principal Nordahl
5	5	"The Spirit Egg"	Sean Lambert	Devin Bunje & Nick Stanton	August 19, 2015	106	0.47
Guest stars: Paula Sorge as Principal Nordahl, Troy Romzek as Rodney, Hope Hite as Leslie
6	6	"The Rival's Arrival"	Sean Lambert	Devin Bunje & Nick Stanton	September 30, 2015	105	0.28
Guest stars: Boogie as Billy, Leah Lewis as Lika
7	7	"The Sponsor"	Sean Lambert	Joel McCrary	October 7, 2015	107	0.41
Guest stars: Boogie as Billy, Mark Gagliardi as Larry Stone
8	8	"The Driving Test"	Sean Lambert	Byron Kavanagh	October 14, 2015	110	0.43
Guest stars: Joe Hursley as Mr. Spanks, Lauren Pritchard as Janice, Julie Ouellette as Elsie
9	9	"The Psycho Zombie Bloodbath"	Jean Sagal	Jason Jordan	October 21, 2015	109	0.44
Guest stars: Joe Hursley as Mr. Spanks, Brian Michael Jones as Chad, Amanda Leighton as Emma
10	10	"The Incident"	Jason Earles	Lindsey Reckis	October 28, 2015	111	0.34
Guest stars: Boogie as Billy, Laura Coover as Miss Dumpler, Greg Perrow as Teddy "Bulldog" Thorton, Cory Smoot as Danny, Kimberly Dooley as Marla
11	11	"The Prank of the Century"	Jason Earles	Jim O'Doherty	November 4, 2015	108	0.46
Guest stars: Lauren Pritchard as Janice, Jordan Maron as Captainsparklez
12	12	"The Odd Couple"	Sean Lambert	Jim O'Doherty	November 25, 2015	113	0.30
When Wendell saves Conor's life, Wendell takes advantage of it by having Conor perform various crazy tasks for him. Then Wendell moves in with Conor after termites were found to be in his house. Meanwhile, Franklin costs Ashley her job when he demands that Billy gives her a 100 percent raise. Franklin and Ashley come up with a plan to get her job back by having Billy hire someone worse than her. Unfortunately for them, Stu, the new employee, is excellent at the job, but that also becomes terrible when it causes Billy's restaurant to be packed. After Stu overhears Franklin, Ashley, and Billy talking about having Ashley fire him, he quits and Ashley gets her job back with a 10 percent raise, which Billy had originally offered. Elsewhere, Conor loses it and asks Franklin to act like termites also attacked his house in order to get Wendell to leave. It works, but then a ceiling fan almost falls on Conor and Franklin saves his life, causing the cycle to repeat itself. Guest star: Boogie as Billy
13	13	"The Longest Yard"	Sean Lambert	Lindsey Reckis	December 2, 2015	116	0.38
Due to an incident at a football state championship game, once a year it is Freak Week and Mr. Spanks gives students and faculty alike detention for no reason whatsoever, such as a student simply smiling. Conor goes to see Coach Wilson and asks about letting Mr. Spanks play the upcoming game because he sat out his freshman year, which meant he still had eligibility left. Conor and Ashley later make a plan to help Mr. Spanks gain his confidence back in return for canceling all of the detention he dished out. Meanwhile, Wendell is jealous that Franklin will be the school mascot. Franklin later performs a long cheer for Janice, but Wendell comes and crashes it with a better cheer and Janice makes him the mascot. However, Wendell ends up in a dirty costume when Franklin reveals that the awesome costume he was in was made by him and his mother. Meanwhile, while Conor and Ashley are helping Mr. Spanks, he continues to come up with lame excuses as to why he can't participate in the game, such as not being able to kick the football properly, but Ashley trash talks him and he gains his confidence back. Later at the game, Janice reveals she let Wendell be the mascot so he would get booed. Mr. Spanks is then put into the game, but double-crosses Conor when he refuses to cancel the detentions he dished out. Unfortunately for Mr. Spanks, he is tackled by everyone on the field, causing Mr. Spanks to break his legs and the cycle to repeat itself. Conor and Ashley then ask Mr. Spanks if it's okay to go to a yacht party and bring everyone; when he says no, they intentionally misunderstand him and tell everyone that detention's over. Guest stars: Joe Hursley as Mr. Spanks, Lauren Pritchard as Janice, Randy McPherson as Coach Wilson
14	14	"The Penpal"	Sean Lambert	Devin Bunje & Nick Stanton	January 27, 2016	114	0.30
Guest stars: Boogie as Billy, Brian Michael Jones as Chad, David Neher as The Rainmaker, Coleton Ray as Donny
15	15	"The Asteroid Blasters"	Phill Lewis	Jason Jordan	February 10, 2016	115	0.32
Guest stars: Lauren Pritchard as Janice, Shulie Cowen as Dottie
16	16	"The Chillerz"	Bill Shea	Jim O'Doherty	February 17, 2016	117	0.43
Conor and his friends are going to appear on the front cover of a gaming magazine. They have to promote a product called the Gamer Grips. However, soon they discover that the gloves make everything fall out of their hands, so they decide not to promote it. Their rival, Lika, decides to promote the product and steals their place on the magazine cover. In response, Conor's team decides to promote another product, the Chillerz, which are making an even bigger advertising campaign. But the shorts start malfunctioning, causing them to get very cold, so in the live interview they decide to tell people about its dangers. Meanwhile, Lika is questioned about the Gamer Grips which have been discovered to cause temporary hand shrinkage, but she keeps denying it despite the evidence. Special guest star: Mark Edward Fischbach as Markiplier Guest stars: Leah Lewis as Lika, Kerri Medders as Zoe
17	17	"The Cabin"	Joel McCrary	Byron Kavanagh	February 24, 2016	118	0.40
Guest stars: Boogie as Billy, Daran Norris as Jefferson Landry, Matt Shea as Ziggy Monroe
18	18	"The Super Kart"	Robbie Countryman	Joel McCrary	March 2, 2016	119	0.39
Guest stars: Lauren Pritchard as Janice, Kyle More as Dwayne Ruckus, Troy Romzek as Rodney, Hope Hite as Leslie
19	19	"The Rock Band"	Leo Howard	Conor Hanney	March 9, 2016	120	0.39
Guest stars: Joe Hursley as Mr. Spanks, David Neher as The Rainmaker, Jeremiah Birkett Bryan Colgate
20	20	"The Goat"	Robbie Countryman	Joel McCrary	March 16, 2016	112	0.29
Guest stars: Joe Hursley as Mr. Spanks, Kyle More as Dwayne Ruckus
21	21	"The Escape Room"	Jim O'Doherty	Jason Jordan	March 23, 2016	121	0.23
Guest stars: Brian Michael Jones as Chad, Lou George as Winthrop, Michael Wayne Foster as Viktor, Bruno Gunn as Karl

=== Season 2 (2016–17) ===
No. overall	No. in season	Title	Directed by	Written by	Original release date	Prod. code	U.S. viewers (millions)
22	1	"The Ringer"	Bill Shea	Jim O'Doherty	July 18, 2016	209	0.24
Special guest star: Karl-Anthony Towns as himself Guest stars: Bernie Kopell as Morty, Kimberly Dooley as Marla Montgomery, Sam Towers as Vlad, Zachary Conneen as Braxton
23	2	"The Olym-pig Torch"	Robbie Countryman	Joel McCrary	July 25, 2016	204	0.37
The Olympic touch is passing through Red Hood. Conor finds it an opportunity to boost Thumbs of Fury's popularity. Conor unveils that Janice stole her bronze Olympic medal; therefore stripping her from carrying it through the town. Meanwhile, Franklin gets to look after the touch and mistakenly takes out the fire. Conor and Franklin attempt to light the touch (stored at the library) but Janice catches them and blackmails them into her carrying the touch. Meanwhile, Wendell and his cousin Dwayne get a job to get rid of sewer pigs. Guest stars: Lauren Pritchard as Janice, Daran Norris as Jefferson Landry, Kyle More as Dwayne Ruckus
24	3	"The Luchador"	Sean Lambert	Devin Bunje & Nick Stanton	August 1, 2016	201	0.31
Guest stars: David Barrera as Sheriff, Shaun Taylor-Corbett as Promoter
25	4	"The Rankening"	Sean Lambert	Jim O'Doherty	August 8, 2016	202	0.30
Guest stars: Faruq Tauheed as himself, Bianca Grava as Alice
26	5	"The Protégé"	Jason Earles	Jason Jordan	August 15, 2016	205	N/A
A new student Spencer tempers with the gang's gaming machine, in result Janice gains electricity powers. Janice forces Conor to insert Spencer into the school's gaming club (only composed of Thumbs of Fury). Spencer wants the team's strategy book. Eventually, Ashley gives him the book. At a team gaming match, it is revealed that Spencer is leader of a highly rated team Total Mayhem. However, Spencer had the wrong book as Thumbs of Fury win. Conor reveals he swapped the books knowing that Ashley would give the book to Spencer. Guest stars: Lauren Pritchard as Janice, Steele Stebbins as Spencer
27	6	"The Battle for Stump Hill" "The Stump War"	Sean Lambert	Byron Kavanagh	August 27, 2016	203	0.28
Red Hood and its rival town are in argument over who won at the battle of the stump. The gang get into a fight with rival school students and the matter reaches to the mayors of the two towns who also fight. War is declared between them. Red Hood mayor Jennifer appoints Conor as leader over an actual army leader. While on a mission to get information, Ashley learns that Wendell is not from Red Hood. This promotes Wendell to doublecross Red Hood and led the rival town. They agree onto a paintball fight. At the battle, Wendell double-crossed the rival town in order for Conor to win it for Red Hood. Guest stars: Daran Norris as Jefferson Landry, Dana Snyder as Mr. Funkus, Conrad Bluth as Chet
28	7	"The Prison Escape Movie"	Jean Sagal	Lindsey Reckis	September 3, 2016	206	0.36
The team fail to watch a PG movie based on a video game due to Ronald constantly cutting them off. Conor and Ashley bring Chad (who is having woman problems) and Janice (who is having man problems) together but first have to go to a double date. Conor and Ashley fake a romantic relationship in which they almost kiss due to a jealous Wendell. They do watch the film and the two hug at the end; in which they were shy; indicating they might love each other. Meanwhile, Chad employees Franklin to work at his comic store. Guest stars: Lauren Pritchard as Janice, Brian Michael Jones as Chad, David Neher as Ronald
29	8	"The Long Weekend"	Jean Sagal	Byron Kavanagh	September 17, 2016	210	0.44
Guest stars: Lauren Pritchard as Janice, Dana Snyder as Mr. Funkus, Laura Coover as Miss Dumpler
30	9	"The Ghost"	Sean Lambert	Devin Bunje & Nick Stanton	October 1, 2016	208	0.22
Ashley's late grandma leaves her fortune telling equipment to Ashley but Conor and Wendell end up using it to make money. They end up helping Janice get rid of a ghost and by mistake release an actual clown ghost named Jasper. Ashley finds out and summons the spirit of her late grandma who lands into Conor. She tells them all they need to know. Ashley, Conor and Wendell trace Jasper to a graveyard but capture him at the mall at the expense of Conor. Ashley goes after Conor to the after life void and rescues him. Conor tricks Ashley into kissing him. Meanwhile, Franklin devises a plan to stop Doyle from stealing candy from children at Halloween. However, he learns that Doyle steals candy because of his concern about children's teeth. Guest stars: Lauren Pritchard as Janice, Matt Rife as Doyle O'Doyle, Skyler Stone as Jasper, Susan Berger as Gerly, Emma Shannon as Eva
31	10	"The Has-Been's Back"	Phill Lewis	Marty Donovan	October 8, 2016	207	0.28
Ashley gets invited into a girls tournament and wants Conor to be her mentor. Conor tries to keep a low profile at the tournament but eventually gets the spot light when he rescues C1-10P "Chopper" from Star Wars Rebels from falling off a building. Conor abandons Ashley in order to feature on Faruq's show for his heroic act. However, last minute, Conor goes back for Ashley who wins the tournament. The two embrace yet again. Meanwhile, Franklin wants to impress Chopper while Wendell wants to compete in the girl's tournament. Guest stars: Faruq Tauheed as Faruq, Savannah Lathem as Chelsea
32	11	"The DJs"	Sean Lambert	Devin Bunje & Nick Stanton	October 15, 2016	211	0.18
Guest stars: Daran Norris as Jefferson Landry, Dana Snyder as Mr. Funkus, Johnnie Ladd as Olivia
33	12	"The Detective"	Sean Lambert	Jim O'Doherty	November 5, 2016	212	0.43
Franklin's project is destroyed, Wendell is presumed to be the culprit, and is expelled and send to some sort of juvenile. The school celebrates the departure of Wendell. Conor sets out to prove Wendell's innocence and finds out that the library lady who hates Wendel, Janice premeditated Wendell's expelling. Thus in result, Wendell's name is cleared and Janice is taken away by police, making her last appearance in the season and series. Meanwhile, Ashley is left alone with a new recruit to the school's gaming club and tends to impresses him but soon learns of his true nature. Guest stars: Lauren Pritchard as Janice, Evan Hofer as Tyler, Kevin Jackson as Joe
34	13	"The Arcade Hero"	Joel McCrary	Jason Jordan	January 2, 2017	213	0.36
Guest stars: Dana Lee as Hiroki Kushiyu, Faruq Tauheed as Faruq, Eduardo Franco as Stu
35	14	"The Stings"	Walter Pridgen	Lindsey Reckis	January 2, 2017	214	0.35
Guest stars: Kyle More as Dwayne Ruckus, Steele Stebbins as Spencer, Faruq Tauheed as Faruq, Samantha Klein as Spencer's Mom
36	15	"The Rodeo"	Leo Howard	Joel McCrary & Marty Donovan	January 2, 2017	215	0.33
Guest stars: Amanda Leighton as Emma, Adam Huber as Cowboy Cody, Paul Cuneo as Rodeo Announcer
37	16	"The Big City"	Jim O'Doherty	Meagan Fulps	January 2, 2017	216	0.37
Guest stars: Kyle More as Dwayne Ruckus, Steele Stebbins as Spencer, Scott Beehner as Coach Brock, Joshua Ovenshire as Jovenshire

== Broadcast ==
In Canada, the series premiered on Disney Channel September 5, 2015, and moved to Disney XD on December 1, 2015.

== Ratings ==
Viewership and ratings per season of Gamer's Guide to Pretty Much Everything
Season	Episodes	First aired		Last aired		Avg. viewers (millions)
Season	Episodes	Date	Viewers (millions)	Date	Viewers (millions)	Avg. viewers (millions)
1	21	July 22, 2015	0.90	March 23, 2016	0.23	0.42
2	15	July 18, 2016	0.24	January 2, 2017	0.37	0.32
