= Ronni Hawk =

American actress

- Occupation: Actress
- Years active: 2014–present
- Known for: Rachel Diaz in Stuck in the Middle; Olivia in On My Block

Ronni Hawk is an American actress. She is known for playing Rachel Diaz in the Disney Channel comedy series Stuck in the Middle, and for playing Olivia in the series On My Block.

== Early life ==
Hawk began dancing at the age of five. When she turned twelve, she began to appear in various commercials. She soon began modeling in Florida until her coach suggested she expand into acting, so she and her family moved to Los Angeles to pursue roles.

== Career ==
After starring in a series of short films, in 2016, Hawk landed the role of Rachel Diaz in the Disney Channel series Stuck in the Middle, a role she found relatable as she herself came from a large family. She was part of the main cast for the first two seasons, then part of the way through the series' third season, she left the show with her character having left to attend college in Paris while doing a fashion internship.

In 2018, Hawk was cast as Olivia in the Netflix series On My Block, which she played during its first season. In the same year, she appeared as Tiffany in an episode of the crime-drama series S.W.A.T.

In 2020, she played Wendy on the supernatural-drama series Legacies for two episodes. She later starred in the 2025 Lifetime movie Murder at the Derby.

== Personal life ==
=== Legal issues ===
In 2020, Ronni Hawk was arrested for domestic abuse on her boyfriend.

== Filmography ==
=== Television ===
Year	Title	Role	Notes
2014	Playing Hooky	Leah	Episode: "Playing Balls"
2016–2018	Stuck in the Middle	Rachel Diaz	Main role (seasons 1–2); special guest star (season 3)
2018	On My Block	Olivia	Recurring role (season 1)
2018	S.W.A.T.	Tiffany	Episode: "The Tiffany Experience"
2020	Legacies	Wendy	2 episodes
2025	Murder at the Derby	Kara Miller	Television film

=== Film ===
Year	Title	Role	Notes
2022	Girl with a Gun	Tomi Shaw	Main role
