= Lauren Pritchard (actress) =

American comic actress

- Occupations: Actress, comedian
- Years active: 2004–present

Lauren Pritchard is an American comedy actress. Pritchard is most notable for her membership in the recurring cast of comedians on sketch comedy series MADtv during its fourteenth season.

Pritchard is part of the two women comedy team Laurelly along with comedian Kelly Vrooman.

== Early life ==
In 2002, Pritchard joined the main company of ComedySportz Los Angeles. In addition to improvising, she also directed the organization's Sunday Team.

== Career ==
=== MADtv ===
Pritchard joined the cast of MADtv in 2008 as a featured player for the show's final season (season 14; 2008–2009). Pritchard had no recurring characters, but she was known for her impressions of Candy Crowley, Jo Frost, and Elizabeth II of the United Kingdom.

=== Madtv musical ===
In 2017, Pritchard was involved with the development of a Madtv musical called The Mad Show.

The Mad Show received a developmental production from Colorado's Theatre Aspen and was featured in presentations at the Wheeler Opera House from September 12 to 16, 2017. The show starred Madtv alumni like Pritchard and Nicole Parker.

==== Impressions ====
Celebrity	Sketch	Season of First Appearance	Notes
René Angélil	Various	14	Husband/manager to Celine Dion
Frances Bavier	Various	14	As her character Aunt Bee from The Andy Griffith Show
Robin Coleman	Various	14	Actress
Candy Crowley	Various	14	CNN Reporter
Jo Frost	Various	14	British nanny and television personality
Michael Kors	Various	14	Fashion designer
Elizabeth II	Various	14	Queen of the United Kingdom and 14 other Commonwealth Realms
Mia Michaels	Various	14	Choreographer on So You Think You Can Dance?

== Filmography ==
Film and television roles
Year	Title	Role	Notes
2004–05	World Cup Comedy	Herself	6 episodes
2004	The Sarah Silverman Program	Abortion Clinic Receptionist	2 episodes
2005	Girlfriends	Veronica	1 episode
2005	Strong Medicine	Tori	1 episode
2005	Taco!	Natalie	Film
2008–09	MADtv	Various Characters	11 episodes
2009	True Blood	Coralee	2 episodes
2010	Imagination Movers	Dr. Felicia Flutter	1 episode
2012	How I Met Your Mother	Waitress	1 episode
2013–14	Jessie	Coach Penny	3 episodes
2015–17	Gamer's Guide to Pretty Much Everything	Janice McManiss	Recurring role, 9 episodes
2016–18	Stuck in the Middle	Bethany Peters	Recurring role, 7 episodes
2020	Apocalypse Goals	Jill Stein	1 episode
2021	Sydney to the Max	Donna	1 episode
2023–24	Make Some Noise	Herself	2 episodes

== See also ==
- ComedySportz
