= Cuck =

Cuck may refer to:

- Commercial Utility Cargo Vehicle (CUCV)
- Cuck (film), a 2019 American film
- Cucking stool, a chair that was used as punishment in Great Britain
- Cuckold, the husband of an adulterous wife
- Cuckoo, a family of birds
- Cuckquean, the feminine version of a cuckold
- Cucq, a community in far northern France
- Cuck (album), the title of an unreleased 2025 studio album by Kanye West

== See also ==
- CUCC (disambiguation)
