= Smurl haunting =

Alleged haunting in Pennsylvania, U.S.

The Smurl haunting refers to claims made by Jack and Janet Smurl of West Pittston, Pennsylvania, U.S., who alleged that a demon inhabited their home between 1974 and 1989. The Smurls' claims gained wide press attention and were investigated by demonologists who encouraged the family to believe that demons were to blame, and clergy, psychologists, and scientific skeptics who offered more parsimonious explanations. The Smurls' version of their story was the subject of a 1986 paperback titled The Haunted and a 1991 made-for-TV movie of the same name released by 20th Century Fox. The 2025 horror film, The Conjuring: Last Rites, offers a loosely adapted portrayal of the Smurl haunting.

== History ==
The Smurls moved into a double-block house on Chase Street in West Pittston, Pennsylvania in August 1973. They claimed that the premises were disturbed by a demon that caused loud noises and bad odors, threw their dog into a wall, shook their mattress, pushed one of their daughters down a flight of stairs, and physically and sexually assaulted family members on several occasions.

In 1986, Ed and Lorraine Warren were called to investigate. According to Ed Warren, the demon that inhabited the Smurls home was "very powerful" and it shook mirrors and furniture after they tried to persuade it to leave by playing religious music and praying. Warren claimed he felt a drop in temperature and saw a "dark mass" form in the home, and the demon once left a message on a mirror telling him to "get out". After months of investigation, Warren alleged that he had a number of audiotapes containing knocking and rapping caused by the demon.

Professor Paul Kurtz of the State University of New York at Buffalo, then-chairman of the Committee for the Scientific Investigation of Claims of the Paranormal, said the Warrens weren't objective, independent, or impartial investigators and characterized the Smurls' claims as "a hoax, a charade, a ghost story." Kurtz said that the family's claims were possibly due to delusions, hallucinations or brain impairment, and advised that they submit themselves to psychiatric and psychological examinations. Jack Smurl told a newspaper reporter he had "surgery to remove water from his brain in 1983 because he had been experiencing short-term memory loss due to a case of meningitis in his youth." Allentown psychologist Robert Gordon commented that "people often look at demonology to explain many tensions that they experience as individuals and within their families".

Spokespeople for the Roman Catholic Church, Diocese of Scranton said they were unsure what might be causing the disturbances. St. Bonaventure University theology professor Alphonsus Trabold, OFM, said there might be other "less demonic" explanations. The home was blessed by several priests who said they saw "no harmful activity while on the property." Janet Smurl claimed an unidentified priest performed three "unsuccessful" exorcisms, and that the demon avoided the rites by "moving between the double-block home" and following the family to other locations. In 1986, a priest from the local diocese spent two nights at the Smurl home and said "nothing unusual happened" during his stay there.

In 1986, the Smurls told the press they were tired of the constant media bombardment; however within a few months, they had authored (along with Ed and Lorraine Warren and Scranton newspaper writer Robert Curran) a paperback book version of their story called The Haunted published by St. Martin's Press. The book was criticized by reviewers such as Wilkes-Barre Times Leader staff writer Joseph Marusfak who wrote, "Robert Curran forsakes the principles of his trade to give readers a one-sided account of what did or didn't occur over several years in Jack and Janet Smurl's former home". Reviewer Mary Beth Gehrman wrote that the book was poorly written, adding that "it is hard to conceive of a supposedly sophisticated objective and (as far as I know, at least until now) credible reporter like Curran taking their story seriously given the complete lack of any empirical or physical evidence to support it."

That same year, the pastor of Immaculate Conception Parish in West Pittston, Rev. Joseph Adonizio, said the Smurls felt that after intense prayers, "things are back to normal." In 1987, Janet Smurl told reporters that they still heard knocking and saw shadows. After the Smurl family moved to Wilkes-Barre, Debra Owens moved into the former Smurl home in 1988 and told reporters she "never encountered anything supernatural while living there."

In 1991, a two-hour made-for-TV movie titled The Haunted was released by 20th Century Fox, written by Curran, the Warrens, and the Smurls, and starring Jeffrey DeMunn as Jack Smurl and Sally Kirkland as Janet Smurl. The 2025 horror film, The Conjuring: Last Rites, offers a loosely adapted portrayal of the Smurl haunting.

Jack Smurl died in 2017 and Janet Smurl died in 2026.
