= Hope Garber =

Canadian actress and singer

- Born: Bessie Hope Wolf; February 18, 1924; London, Ontario, Canada
- Died: September 7, 2005 (aged 81); Los Angeles, California, U.S.
- Spouse: Joseph Garber
- Children: 3, including Victor Garber

Bessie Hope Wolf (February 18, 1924 – September 7, 2005), known professionally as Hope Garber, was a Canadian actress and singer, latterly based in the United States.

== Early life ==
Garber was born in London, Ontario, to Louis and Fruma Wolf.

== Career ==
Garber was a popular singer with several dance bands during the 1940s. She later performed on many television programs and commercials in Toronto and Los Angeles, and also hosted a television show on CFPL-TV in London, Ontario called At Home with Hope Garber.

== Personal life ==
After her retirement, she developed Alzheimer's disease of which she died on September 7th, 2005, at age 81. She was survived by three children from her marriage to Joseph Garber, including the stage, film, and television actor Victor Garber. She was Jewish.

== Filmography ==
=== Film ===
Year	Title	Role	Notes
1997	Wag the Dog	Albanian Grandmother	
1998	The Politics of Desire	Townsfolk	

=== Television ===
Year	Title	Role	Notes
1973	She Cried Murder	Mrs. Brody	Television film
1991	The Haunted	Aunt Lily	Television film
1991	Who's the Boss?	Woman #1	Episode: "The Road to Washington: Part 2"
