= Michael O'Leary (actor) =

American actor

- Born: March 27, 1958 (age 67); Saint Paul, Minnesota, U.S.
- Education: California State University, Fullerton
- Occupation: Actor
- Years active: 1980–present
- Spouse: Joni Parker (m. 1988; div. 2016)
- Children: 2

Michael O'Leary (born March 27, 1958) is an American actor. He is known for playing Rick Bauer in the soap opera Guiding Light, for which he was nominated for a Daytime Emmy Award in 1985.

== Early life and education ==
O'Leary was born in Saint Paul, Minnesota, and raised in Diamond Bar, California. He majored in television at California State University, Fullerton.

== Career ==
O'Leary played the character of Dr. Fredrick "Rick" Bauer on Guiding Light from 1983 to 1986, 1987 to 1991, and again from 1995 to 2009, when the series ended. In January 2022, it was announced that O'Leary would appear in Halloween Ends.

== Filmography ==
=== Film ===
Year	Title	Role	Notes
1981	Lovely But Deadly	Steve Berringer	
1984	Fatal Games	Frank Agee	
2022	Halloween Ends	Dr. Mathis	

=== Television ===
Year	Title	Role	Notes
1980	CHiPs	Bernie	2 episodes
1981	The Greatest American Hero	Student #1	Episode: "The Lost Diablo"
1982	Gimme a Break!	Todd	Episode: "Sam's Imaginary Friend"
1983	T. J. Hooker	Gordie Hobbs	Episode: "Sweet Sixteen and Dead"
1983–2009	Guiding Light	Dr. Rick Bauer	Role from: May 13, 1983 – December 26, 1986, July 3, 1987 – February 20, 1991, March 31, 1995 – September 18, 2009
1992	Doogie Howser, M.D.	Stuart Fenmore	Episode: "My Father, My Self"
1999	Law & Order	Eric Hagen	Episode: "Justice"
2011	The Bay	Michael Donovan	Episode: "Far from the Bay Part 2: Steamboat"
2018	New Amsterdam	Donor	Episode: "Anthropocene"
2019	Venice: The Series	Bob	Episode: "One"
2021	FBI	Howard Kirkland	Episode: "Checks and Balances"
2021	Law & Order: Organized Crime	Father Brendan Hogan	2 episodes
