= Victor Garber =

Canadian actor (born 1949)

Victor Garber OC
- Garber in 2026
- Born: Victor Jay Garber; March 16, 1949 (age 77); London, Ontario, Canada
- Occupations: Actor; singer
- Years active: 1972–present
- Spouse: Rainer Andreesen (m. 2015)
- Mother: Bessie Hope Wolf

Victor Garber, OC (born March 16, 1949) is a Canadian stage and film actor, and a singer. Known for his work on stage and screen, he has been nominated for three Gemini Awards, four Tony Awards and six Primetime Emmy Awards. In 2022 he was made an Officer of the Order of Canada.

Garber originated roles in the Broadway productions of Sweeney Todd: The Demon Barber of Fleet Street in 1979 (as Anthony Hope), Noises Off in 1983 (as Garry LeJeune), Lend Me a Tenor in 1989 (as Max), Arcadia in 1995 (as Bernard Nightingale), and Art in 1998 (as Serge). He has received four Tony Award nominations for his performances in the play Deathtrap in 1978 (as Clifford Anderson), the Neil Simon musical Little Me in 1982 (as The Men in Belle's Life), Lend Me a Tenor in 1989, and the musical comedy revival of Damn Yankees in 1994 (as Applegate). He created the role of John Wilkes Booth in the original cast of the 1990 Off-Broadway run of Assassins. In 2018, he returned to Broadway in the revival of Hello, Dolly! as Horace Vandergelder opposite Bernadette Peters and Gavin Creel.

He made his film debut as Jesus Christ in the musical Godspell (1973). He has also been nominated for three Screen Actors Guild Awards along with the casts of the critically acclaimed films Titanic (1997), Milk (2008), and Argo (2012), winning for Argo. Other notable films include Sleepless in Seattle (1993), The First Wives Club (1996), Cinderella (1997), Annie (1999), Legally Blonde (2001), Sicario (2015), Dark Waters (2019), and Happiest Season (2020).

On television, Garber is best known as Jack Bristow in the ABC series Alias (2001 to 2006) for which he received three consecutive Primetime Emmy Award for Outstanding Supporting Actor in a Drama Series nominations. He received further Emmy nominations for his portrayal of Sidney Luft in Life with Judy Garland: Me and My Shadows (2001) and for his guest roles in the sitcoms Frasier in 2001 and Will & Grace in 2005. Garber portrayed Martin Stein / Firestorm in the superhero series The Flash (2015–2017) and Legends of Tomorrow (2016–2017, 2021), which are part of the Arrowverse. He also starred in Canadian television series, Family Law (2021–2026).

== Early life ==
Victor Garber was born in London, Ontario, Canada, and is of Russian-Jewish descent. His father was Joseph Garber (1914-2005), and his mother, Bessie Hope Wolf (1924-2005), was an actress and singer and the host of At Home with Hope Garber. He has a brother, Nathan, and a sister, Alisa.

Garber attended Ryerson Elementary School and London Central Secondary School. He began acting at the age of nine in 1958. Garber enrolled in the children's program of the Grand Theatre, and, at age 16, he was accepted at a six-week summer theatre training program at the University of Toronto taught by Robert Gill. In New York, he studied acting at HB Studio.

== Career ==
=== Music ===
In 1967, after a period working as a solo folk singer, Garber formed a folk group called The Sugar Shoppe with Peter Mann, Laurie Hood and Lee Harris. The group enjoyed moderate success, breaking into the Canadian Top 40 with a version of Bobby Gimby's song "Canada" (1967). Three other Sugar Shoppe songs made the lower reaches of the Canadian Top 100 in 1967 and 1968. The band had performed on The Ed Sullivan Show and The Tonight Show Starring Johnny Carson before breaking up.

=== Theatre ===
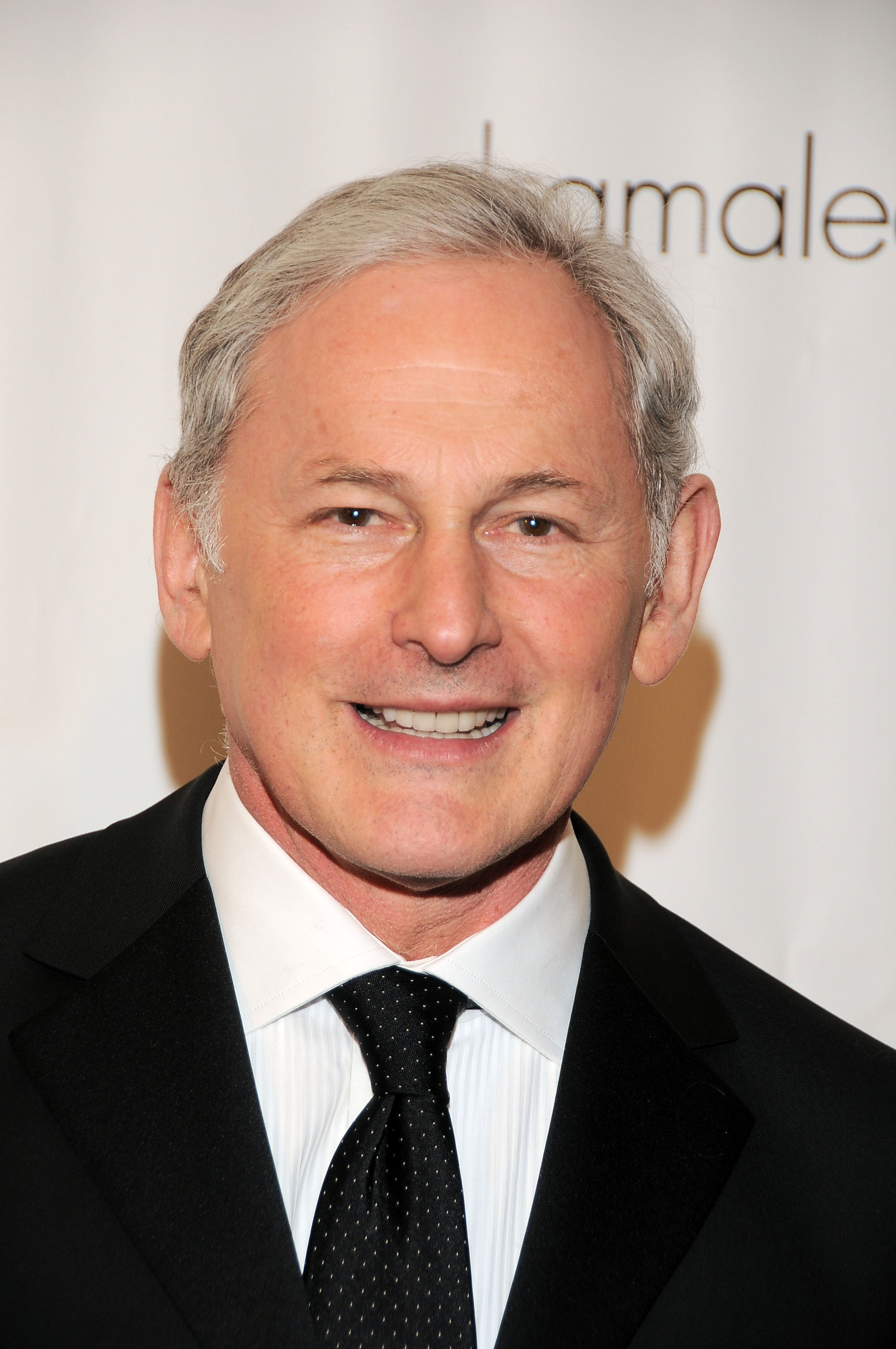
Garber in February 2010

Garber played Jesus in Toronto's 1972 production of Godspell, alongside Eugene Levy, Andrea Martin, Gilda Radner, Dave Thomas, Paul Shaffer and Martin Short. In 1985, he appeared in Noises Off at the Ahmanson Theatre in Los Angeles.

He appeared on Broadway in the original productions of Deathtrap, Sweeney Todd and Noises Off (1983), and in the original Off-Broadway cast of Assassins, as well as the 1990s revival of Damn Yankees. In 1986, Garber appeared at Circle in the Square opposite Uta Hagen in You Never Can Tell. He was nominated for four Tony Awards and opened the 48th Tony Awards program in 1994 (the year he was nominated for the Tony Award for Best Actor in a Musical for Damn Yankees). In 1998, he co-starred on Broadway in the Tony Award-winning play Art with Alan Alda and Alfred Molina. In 2005, he played the role of Fredrik Egerman in the Los Angeles Opera production of A Little Night Music. He played Ben Stone in a critically praised Encores! staged concert production of Follies (2007) opposite Donna Murphy. In mid-2007, he played Garry Essendine in a production of Noël Coward's Present Laughter at Boston's Huntington Theatre. He reprised the role on Broadway in the Roundabout Theatre production, which opened in January 2010.

In January 2018, Garber replaced David Hyde Pierce as Horace Vandergelder in the Tony-winning Broadway revival of Hello, Dolly! at the Shubert Theatre opposite Bernadette Peters. Garber began performances on January 20, prior to the press opening on February 22.

Garber received the 2018 Theatre World John Willis Award for Lifetime Achievement.

=== Film ===
His earlier film work includes Godspell (1973) as Jesus Christ (the part he played originally in the 1972 Canadian stage production) and Sleepless in Seattle (1993). He starred opposite Goldie Hawn, Diane Keaton, and Bette Midler in The First Wives Club as film producer Bill Atchison, husband of Hawn's character Elise Eliot, in 1996. In James Cameron's Titanic (1997), he essayed a Mid-Ulster accent to play the shipbuilder Thomas Andrews.

In 2009, Garber voiced DC Comics supervillain Sinestro in the direct-to-video animated film Green Lantern: First Flight. That same year, Garber played a Klingon interrogator in J. J. Abrams' Star Trek film; however, his scenes were deleted from the finished film.

In 2010, Garber had an uncredited cameo in The Town, directed by Ben Affleck, as David, a bank manager. Garber also appeared in the film Ice Quake. In late 2012, he appeared in Affleck's film Argo, about the Iran hostage crisis; Garber portrayed Canadian Ambassador to Iran Kenneth D. Taylor. He also co-starred in 2014 thriller Big Game.

Garber narrated the 2017 film They Shall Not Perish. Other film appearances include Annie (1999), Legally Blonde (2001), and Tuck Everlasting (2002).

=== Television ===
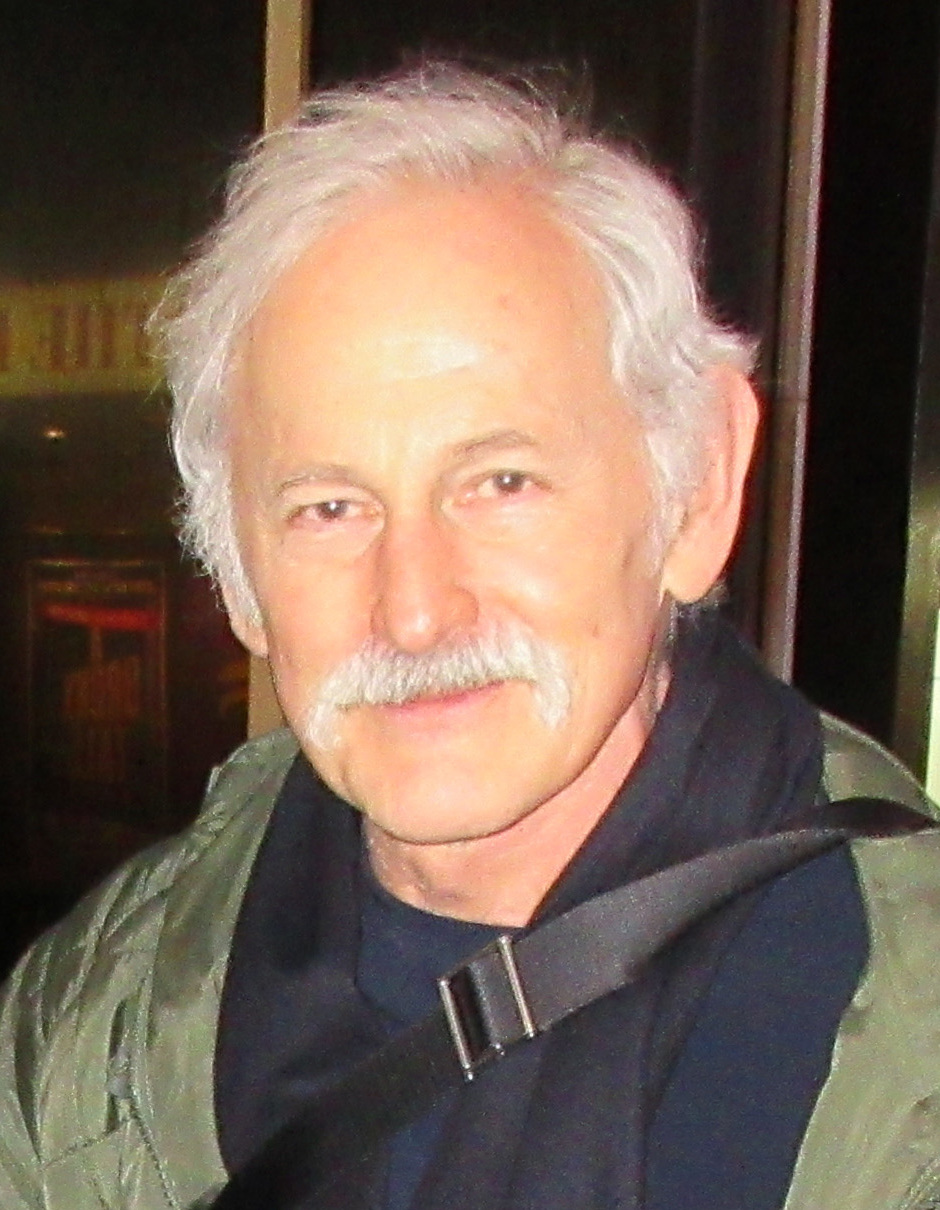
Garber in March 2018

On television, he has had roles on American and Canadian shows. Garber's first leading role on television show was in CBS's 1985 summer series I Had Three Wives. He had a recurring guest role on CTV's E.N.G. (1991–93). He portrayed Jack Bristow, the father of main character Sydney Bristow on ABC's Alias, earning three Emmy nominations. He next starred on the television series Justice (2006) on Fox and ABC's Eli Stone. He appeared as Olivier Roth in four episodes of the Canadian science drama ReGenesis. He appeared in the Fox series Glee in the third episode titled "Acafellas", as Will Schuester (Matthew Morrison)'s father Mr. Schuester. He played Martin Stein / Firestorm on The Flash starting with the episode "Crazy for You" (2015), before being spun off onto Legends of Tomorrow, where he was a series regular for its first and second seasons (2016–2017) and half of the third season (2017). Garber made his final appearance as a regular in the crossover event "Crisis on Earth-X" (2017), where Stein was killed off. However, he reprised his role in the series' 100th episode, "Wvrdr_error_100<oest-of-th3-gs.gid30n> not found" (2021), where Stein appears as part of Gideon's memories. Additionally, Garber made an independent return to The Flash in the season three episode "Duet" (2017) as the unnamed husband of gangster Digsy Foss (Jesse L. Martin) in a dream world. Garber reprised his role as Stein for a final time in a vocal cameo in "A New World" (2023), the series finale of The Flash. He also played the recurring character Admiral Halsey on The Orville.

== Personal life ==
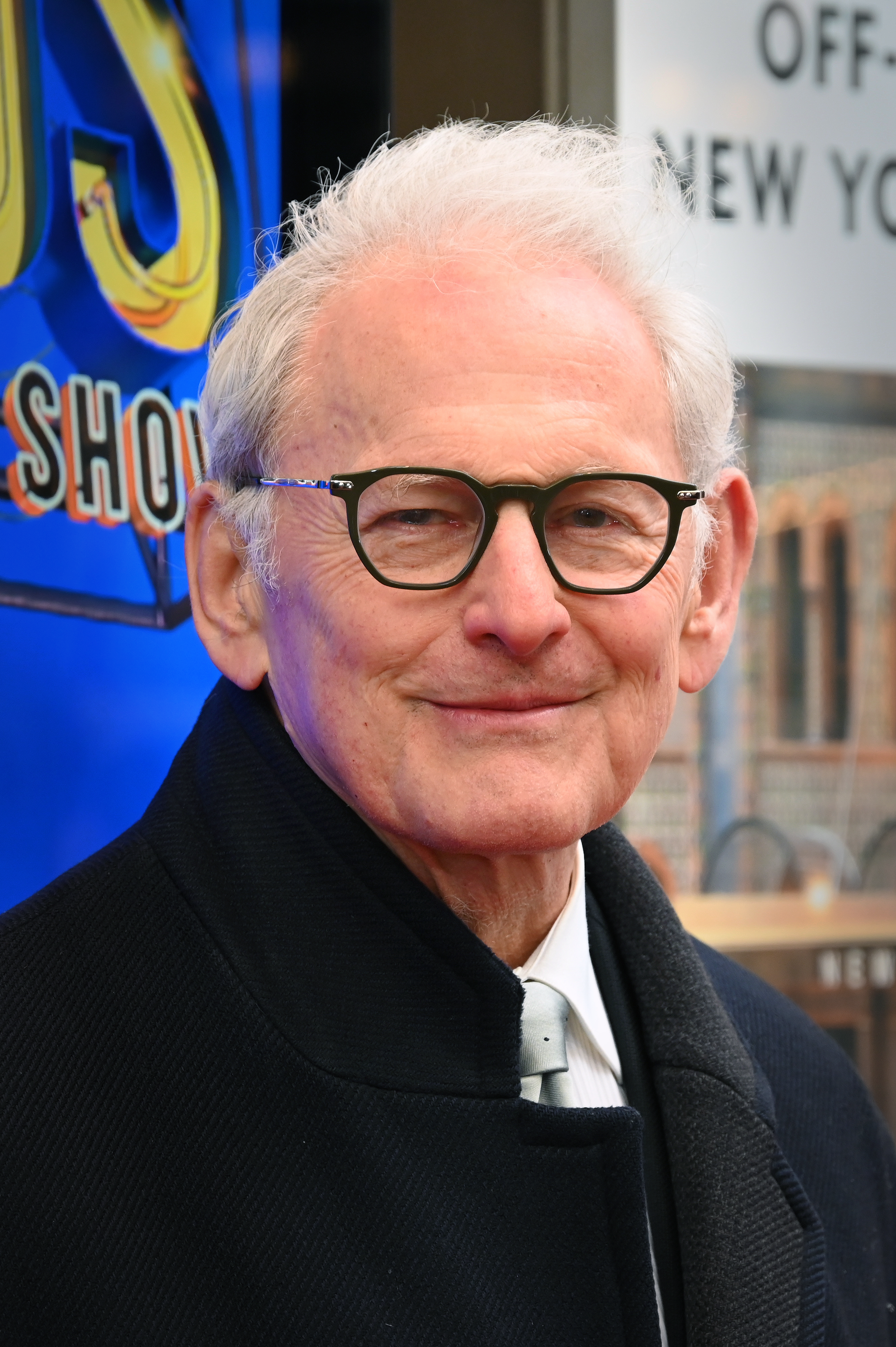
Garber in April 2025

Garber prefers to keep his personal life private and has largely stayed out of the tabloids. In 2012, he referred publicly to being gay. In 2013, he said, "I don't really talk about it but everybody knows." Garber has been in a relationship with Canadian artist and model Rainer Andreesen since 2000. On October 10, 2015, Andreesen announced on his Instagram page that he and Garber had married in Canada.

Garber has type 1 diabetes. He was diagnosed in 1962 at the age of 12. He has managed his condition throughout his prolific stage and screen career while becoming a prominent advocate for diabetes awareness. During early stage performances like Godspell, he kept honey, orange juice, or sugar packets on or near the stage to manage the unexpected blood sugar drops of diabetes.

Garber is good friends with his Alias co-star Jennifer Garner, and officiated her 2005 wedding to Ben Affleck. Garber and Andreesen were the only guests at the private wedding. He is also the godfather of their first child, Violet.

== Filmography ==
Key
| † | Denotes films that have not yet been released |

=== Film ===
| Year | Title | Role | Notes |
|---|---|---|---|
| 1973 | Godspell | Jesus Christ | |
| 1974 | Monkeys in the Attic | Eric | |
| 1981 | In the Research of Path of Life | Benjamin Lonergan | |
| 1988 | The Legendary Life of Ernest Hemingway | Ernest Hemingway | |
| 1992 | Singles | Child's Father | Uncredited cameo |
| 1992 | Light Sleeper | Tis Brooke | |
| 1993 | Sleepless in Seattle | Greg | |
| 1993 | Life with Mikey | Brian Spiro | |
| 1993 | I'll Never Get to Heaven | Eric Hoskins | |
| 1994 | Exotica | Harold Brown | |
| 1994 | Mixed Nuts | Irate Neighbour | Voice |
| 1995 | Jeffrey | Tim | |
| 1995 | Kleptomania | Morgan Allen | |
| 1996 | The First Wives Club | Bill Atchison | |
| 1997 | Titanic | Thomas Andrews | |
| 1997 | The Absolution of Anthony | Father Carson | Short |
| 1998 | How Stella Got Her Groove Back | Isaac | Uncredited cameo |
| 2001 | Legally Blonde | Professor Aaron Callahan | |
| 2002 | Tuck Everlasting | Robert Foster | |
| 2002 | Home Room | Det. Martin Van Zandt | |
| 2008 | Milk | Mayor George Moscone | |
| 2009 | Green Lantern: First Flight | Sinestro | Voice |
| 2009 | Star Trek | Klingon Interrogator | Deleted scene |
| 2010 | You Again | Mark Olsen | |
| 2010 | The Town | David | Uncredited cameo |
| 2011 | Kung Fu Panda 2 | Master Thundering Rhino | Voice |
| 2011 | The Entitled | Bob Vincent | |
| 2011 | Take Me Home | Arnold Colvin | |
| 2012 | Argo | Ken Taylor | |
| 2012 | Moving Day | Wilf Redmond | |
| 2013 | I'll Follow You Down | Sal | |
| 2014 | Big Game | Vice President | |
| 2015 | Self/less | Martin O'Neill | |
| 2015 | Consumed | Dan Conway | |
| 2015 | Sicario | Dave Jennings | |
| 2017 | Rebel in the Rye | Sol Salinger | |
| 2019 | Dark Waters | Phil Donnelly | |
| 2020 | Funny Face | Developer's Father | |
| 2020 | Happiest Season | Ted Caldwell | |
| 2023 | Wish | Sabino | Voice |
| 2024 | Fly Me to the Moon | Senator Hedges | |
| 2024 | Relay | McVie | |
| 2027 | Return to You † | Frank Kessler | Post-production |
| TBA | Eloise † | TBA | Post-production |
| TBA | Trust the Man † | TBA | Post-production |

=== Television ===
| Year | Title | Role | Notes |
|---|---|---|---|
| 1974 | Jack: A Flash Fantasy | Jack of Hearts | Television film |
| 1974 | ABC Afterschool Special | Christian de Neuvillette | Voice, episode: "Cyrano" |
| 1975 | Hallmark Hall of Fame | Marquis de Lafayette | Episode: "Valley Forge" |
| 1976 | Great Performances | Arthur Miller | Episode: "Ah, Wilderness" |
| 1977 | The Best of Families | Teddy Wheeler | Miniseries |
| 1978 | Tartuffe | Valère | Television film |
| 1983 | Charley's Aunt | Jack Chesney | Television film |
| 1985 | I Had Three Wives | Jackson Beaudine | Main role (5 episodes) |
| 1985 | Tales from the Darkside | Ambrose Cavender | Episode: "The Tear Collector" |
| 1985 | Private Sessions | Jerry Sharma | Television film |
| 1986 | The Twilight Zone | Dr. Kevin Carlson | Episode: "A Day in Beaumont" |
| 1986 | Roanoak | John White | Television film |
| 1986 | Guiding Light | Det. Frank Minnelli | Unknown episodes |
| 1987–1991 | The Days and Nights of Molly Dodd | Dennis Widmer | 10 episodes |
| 1988 | Liberace: Behind the Music | Liberace | Television film |
| 1991 | Grand Larceny | Judge Keeler | Television film |
| 1991–1993 | E.N.G. | Adam Hirsch | 10 episodes |
| 1992 | The First Circle | Lew Rubin | Television film |
| 1992 | I'll Fly Away | Warren | Episode: "Fragile Truths" |
| 1992 | The Powers That Be | Mack Novitz | Episode: "Oh, Mack" |
| 1993 | Alex Haley's Queen | Digby | Miniseries |
| 1993 | Dieppe | Lord Louis Mountbatten | Television film |
| 1993 | Woman on the Run: The Lawrencia Bembenek Story | Frank Marrocco | Television film |
| 1993 | Sesame Street | Charles | Episode: "Barkley Wants to Play" |
| 1994 | Kung Fu: The Legend Continues | Blackwell | Episode: "The Innocent" |
| 1995 | Law & Order | Paul Sandig | Episode: "Savages" |
| 1995 | Almost Perfect | Howard Guthrie | Episode: "You Like Me, You Really Like Me" |
| 1996 | Hostile Advances | Jack Gilcrest | Television film |
| 1996 | F/X: The Series | Andrew Price | Episode: "The Brotherhood" |
| 1996 | The Outer Limits | Dr. Ben McCormick | Episode: "Out of Body" |
| 1997 | Cinderella | King Maximilian | Television film |
| 1997 | Let Me Call You Sweetheart | Geoff Dorso | Television film |
| 1997 | Liberty! The American Revolution | John Dickinson | 6 episodes |
| 1999 | Summer's End | Narrator | Voice, television film |
| 1999 | Invisible Child | Tim Beeman | Television film |
| 1999 | Annie | Oliver "Daddy" Warbucks | Television film |
| 1999 | External Affairs | Harry Raymond | Television film |
| 2000 | Love and Murder | Inspector Philip Millard | Television film |
| 2000 | Frasier | Ferguson | Episode: "Taking Liberties" |
| 2000 | The Outer Limits | Dr. Edward Normandy | Episode: "Glitch" |
| 2001 | Life with Judy Garland: Me and My Shadows | Sidney Luft | Miniseries |
| 2001 | The Wandering Soul Murders | Inspector Philip Millard | Television film |
| 2001 | A Colder Kind of Death | Inspector Philip Millard | Television film |
| 2001 | Laughter on the 23rd Floor | Kenny Franks | Television film |
| 2001 | Call Me Claus | Taylor | Television film |
| 2001–2006 | Alias | Jack Bristow | Main cast (105 episodes) |
| 2002 | Torso: The Evelyn Dick Story | J.J. Robinette | Television film |
| 2003 | The Music Man | Mayor George Shinn | Television film |
| 2003 | It's All Relative | Jerry / Joffrey | Episode: "The Doctor Is Out" |
| 2004 | Will & Grace | Peter Bovington | Episode: "Saving Grace, Again: Part 2" |
| 2006 | Justice | Ron Trott | 13 episodes |
| 2007 | American Masters | Narrator | Episode: "Novel Reflections: The American Dream" |
| 2007 | Ugly Betty | Professor Barrett | Episode: "Grin and Bear It" |
| 2007–2008 | ReGenesis | Oliver Roth | 5 episodes |
| 2008–2009 | Eli Stone | Jordan Wethersby | 26 episodes |
| 2009 | The Last Templar | Monsignor De Angelis | Miniseries |
| 2009 | Everything She Ever Wanted | Walter Allanson | Miniseries |
| 2009 | Glee | Mr. Schuester | Episode: "Acafellas" |
| 2009 | Nurse Jackie | Neil Nutterman | 2 episodes |
| 2009 | Rex | Paul | Television film |
| 2009 | America Before Columbus | Narrator | Documentary |
| 2009–2014 | Web Therapy | Kip Wallice | Web series, 8 episodes |
| 2010 | Ice Quake | Colonel Bill Hughes | Television film |
| 2010–2013 | Republic of Doyle | Garrison Steel | 4 episodes |
| 2011 | Stargate Universe | Ambassador Ovirda | Episode: "Seizure" |
| 2011 | Suits | Phillip Hardman | Pilot (scenes cut in US release) |
| 2011 | Murdoch Mysteries | Detective Malcolm Lamb | Episode: "Tattered and Torn" |
| 2011 | Flashpoint | Dr. Larry Toth | 3 episodes |
| 2011 | 30 Rock | Eugene Gremby | Episode: "Respawn" |
| 2011 | Law & Order: LA | Walter Calvin | Episode: "Angel's Knoll" |
| 2011 | William & Catherine: A Royal Romance | Charles, Prince of Wales | Television film |
| 2011 | Charlie's Angels | Charles "Charlie" Townsend | Voice, 8 episodes |
| 2011–2015 | Web Therapy | Kip Wallice | Main role (19 episodes) |
| 2012 | The Big C | Willie Wanker | Episode: "Family Matters" |
| 2012 | Damages | Bennett Herreshoff | 3 episodes |
| 2012 | The Firm | Judge Walter A. Dominic | Episode: "Chapter 6" |
| 2013 | Deception | Robert Bowers | Main role (11 episodes) |
| 2013 | The Hunters | Mason Fuller | Television film |
| 2014 | The Good Wife | Judge Loudon Spencer | Episode: "We, the Juries" |
| 2014 | Sleepy Hollow | Mr. Crane | Episode: "Bad Blood" |
| 2014 | Louie | Louie's Lawyer | Episode: "Model" |
| 2014 | Working the Engels | Dr. Colin Shandy | Episode: "Family Therapy" |
| 2014 | Blue Bloods | Donald Stein | Episode: "Under the Gun" |
| 2014–2020 | Power | Simon Stern | 16 episodes |
| 2015 | Motive | Neville Montgomery | 4 episodes |
| 2015 | The Slap | Narrator | Miniseries |
| 2015 | Bob's Broken Sleigh | Fluffy | Voice; TV special |
| 2015–2017, 2023 | The Flash | Martin Stein / Firestorm | 12 episodes |
| 2015–2017, 2023 | The Flash | Digsy Foss's husband | Episode: "Duet" |
| 2016 | Vixen | Martin Stein / Firestorm | Voice, episode: "Episode #2.1" |
| 2016–2017, 2021 | Legends of Tomorrow | Martin Stein / Firestorm | Main role (42 episodes) |
| 2016–2017, 2021 | Legends of Tomorrow | Eobard Thawne | Episode: "The Chicago Way" |
| 2016–2017, 2021 | Legends of Tomorrow | Sir Henry Stein | Episode: "Return of the Mack" |
| 2017 | Modern Family | Charles Dumont | Episode: "Do It Yourself" |
| 2017 | Difficult People | John Passias | Episode: "Cindarestylox" |
| 2017 | Supergirl | Martin Stein / Firestorm | Episode: "Crisis on Earth-X, Part 1" |
| 2017 | Arrow | Martin Stein / Firestorm | Episode: "Crisis on Earth-X, Part 2" |
| 2017–2022 | The Orville | Admiral Halsey | 13 episodes |
| 2018–2020 | Spirit Riding Free | James Prescott Sr. | Voice, 2 episodes |
| 2019 | Tales of the City | Sam Garland | 7 episodes |
| 2020 | Schitt's Creek | Clifton Sparks | Episode: "Sunrise, Sunset" |
| 2020–2021 | Power Book II: Ghost | Simon Stern | 4 episodes |
| 2021 | The Simpsons | Michael de Graff | Voice, episode: "Portrait of a Lackey on Fire" |
| 2021 | Beebo Saves Christmas | Narrator | TV special |
| 2021–2026 | Family Law | Harry Svensson | Main role (40 episodes) |
| 2023 | The Last Thing He Told Me | Professor Tobias Cookman | Episode: "Witness to Your Life" |
| 2023–2025 | And Just Like That... | Mark Kasabian | 5 episodes |
| 2024 | American Horror Stories | David Woodrow Randolph | Episode: "Clone" |
| 2026 | Not Suitable for Work | Wes Dryden | 5 episodes |
| 2026 | Last Week Tonight with John Oliver | Pit conductor | Episode: "Structured Settlements" |

=== Theatre ===
Source: Playbill

| Year | Production | Role | Venue |
|---|---|---|---|
| 1972–1975 | Godspell | Jesus Christ | Royal Alexandra Theatre Westbury Music Fair Paper Mill Playhouse |
| 1973 | Ghosts | Performer | Roundabout Theatre Company |
| 1975 | Joe's Opera | Performer | |
| 1976 | Cracks | Performer | |
| 1977 | The Shadow Box | Mark | Morosco Theatre, Broadway |
| 1977 | Tartuffe | Valère | Circle in the Square Theatre, Broadway |
| 1978 | Deathtrap | Cliff Anderson | Biltmore Theatre, Broadway |
| 1979 | Sweeney Todd: The Demon Barber of Fleet Street | Anthony Hope | Uris Theatre, Broadway |
| 1979–1981 | They're Playing Our Song | Vernon Gersch | Imperial Theatre, Broadway |
| 1982 | Little Me | Various roles | Eugene O'Neill Theatre, Broadway |
| 1983 | Noises Off | Garry Lejeune | Brooks Atkinson Theatre, Broadway |
| 1986–1987 | You Never Can Tell | Valentine | Circle in the Square Theatre, Broadway |
| 1988 | The Devil's Disciple | Richard Dudgeon | Circle in the Square Theatre, Broadway |
| 1988 | Wenceslas Square | Performer | |
| 1989 | Love Letters | Andrew Makepeace Ladd III | Promenade Theatre |
| 1989 | Lend Me a Tenor | Max | Royale Theatre, Broadway |
| 1990 | Merrily We Roll Along | Franklin Shepard | Arena Stage |
| 1990–1991 | Assassins | John Wilkes Booth | Playwrights Horizons, Off-Broadway |
| 1992 | Two Shakespearean Actors | Edwin Forrest | Cort Theatre, Broadway |
| 1994–1995 | Damn Yankees | Mr. Applegate | Marquis Theatre, Broadway |
| 1995 | Arcadia | Bernard Nightingale | Vivian Beaumont Theater, Broadway |
| 1998 | 'Art' | Serge | Royale Theatre, Broadway |
| 2004 | A Little Night Music | Fredrik Egerman | Los Angeles Opera |
| 2007 | Follies | Benjamin Stone | New York City Center, Off-Broadway |
| 2009 | A Little Night Music | Fredrik Egerman | Walter Kerr Theatre, Broadway |
| 2010 | Present Laughter | Garry Essendine | American Airlines Theatre, Broadway |
| 2011 | She Loves Me | Zoltan Maraczek | Stephen Sondheim Theatre, Broadway |
| 2018 | Hello, Dolly! | Horace Vandergelder | Shubert Theatre, Broadway |
| 2023 | Love Letters | Andrew Makepeace Ladd III | Irish Repertory Theatre, Off-Broadway |
| 2023 | Gutenberg! The Musical! | The Producer (One night cameo) | James Earl Jones Theatre, Broadway |

== Awards and nominations ==
In addition to industry awards, Garber was appointed to the Order of Canada in 2022, with the rank of Officer.

| Organizations | Year | Category | Nominated work | Result | Ref. |
|---|---|---|---|---|---|
| Drama Desk Awards | 1984 | Outstanding Ensemble | Noises Off | Won | |
| Drama Desk Awards | 1987 | Outstanding Actor in a Play | You Never Can Tell | Nominated | |
| Primetime Emmy Awards | 2001 | Outstanding Supporting Actor in a Limited Series | Life with Judy Garland: Me and My Shadows | Nominated | |
| Primetime Emmy Awards | 2001 | Outstanding Guest Actor in a Comedy Series | Frasier (episode: "Taking Liberties") | Nominated | |
| Primetime Emmy Awards | 2002 | Outstanding Supporting Actor in a Drama Series | Alias (episode: "Color Blind" + "Almost Thirty Years") | Nominated | |
| Primetime Emmy Awards | 2003 | Outstanding Supporting Actor in a Drama Series | Alias (episode: "Passage Part 2" + "Endgame") | Nominated | |
| Primetime Emmy Awards | 2004 | Outstanding Supporting Actor in a Drama Series | Alias (episode: "Breaking Point" + "Hourglass") | Nominated | |
| Primetime Emmy Awards | 2005 | Outstanding Guest Actor in a Comedy Series | Will & Grace (episode: "Saving Grace, Again") | Nominated | |
| Screen Actors Guild Awards | 1997 | Outstanding Cast in a Motion Picture | Titanic | Nominated | |
| Screen Actors Guild Awards | 2008 | Outstanding Cast in a Motion Picture | Milk | Nominated | |
| Screen Actors Guild Awards | 2012 | Outstanding Cast in a Motion Picture | Argo | Won | |
| Tony Awards | 1978 | Best Featured Actor in a Play | Deathtrap | Nominated | |
| Tony Awards | 1982 | Best Actor in a Musical | Little Me | Nominated | |
| Tony Awards | 1989 | Best Actor in a Play | Lend Me a Tenor | Nominated | |
| Tony Awards | 1994 | Best Actor in a Musical | Damn Yankees | Nominated | |
