= Fatal Games =

- Theatrical poster
- Directed by: Michael Elliot
- Written by: Rafael Buñuel; Michael Elliot; Christopher Mankiewicz
- Produced by: William Kroes
- Starring: Sally Kirkland; Lynn Banashek; Sean Masterson; Michael O'Leary; Teal Roberts; Spice Williams-Crosby
- Cinematography: Alfred Taylor
- Edited by: Jonathon Braun
- Music by: Shuki Levy
- Production company: Impact Films
- Distributed by: Media Home Entertainment
- Release date: 1984
- Running time: 88 minutes
- Country: United States
- Language: English

Fatal Games (also known as Olympic Nightmare) is a 1984 American slasher film written and directed by Michael Elliott and starring Sally Kirkland, Lynn Banashek, Sean Masterson, Michael O'Leary, Teal Roberts, and Spice Williams-Crosby. The film follows a masked slasher, wielding a javelin, killing off members of a high school gymnastics team.

Fatal Games was released in 1984 and received mostly mixed-to-negative reviews. The film shares many of its plot points with an earlier slasher film, Graduation Day (1981).

== Plot ==
A seven member gymnastics team—Annie Rivers, Sue Allen Baines, Nancy Wilson and Frank Agee, gymnastics; Joe Ward and Phil Dandridge, track and field; and Lynn Fox, swimming—at the Falcon Academy of Athletics in Brookfall, Massachusetts is up for a Nationals competition. Dr. Jordine and his assistant, Diane, oversee the athletes' progress and administer them a number of performance-enhancing experimental steroids. Diane expresses to Dr. Jordine that she feels their medicalization to be unethical, but wavers as he tells her this is the culmination of his life's work.

In the days leading up to the Nationals competition, the athletes at Brookfall begin to disappear, first with Nancy, who is impaled with a javelin by an assailant in a black tracksuit with an obscured face. Meanwhile, Annie is struggling to balance her studies and school as well as her commitment to her athletic pursuits. Phil, her boyfriend, is a source of emotional support.

As the members of Falcon Academy continue to be murdered by the javelin-armed killer and disappear, Annie and Phil attempt to uncover the source for their teammates' disappearances. Frank is subsequently injured in a training accident that leaves him with a broken leg and requires him to use crutches. While investigating the academy one night, Frank finds the corpses of the murdered students in unused lockers in the basement before being confronted by the killer, who murders him with the javelin on a staircase.

Simultaneously, Annie has also entered the academy, and hears Frank's screams before being chased by the killer herself. She narrowly manages to escape the assailant, who stabs her before she is saved by Phil. Phil brings an injured Annie to Diane's training office to locate medical supplies. Unbeknownst to them, Diane is revealed to be the killer, and she quickly removes her disguise before the two see her in the office. Phil leaves to get help, assuming Diane will treat Annie's wound. Annie notices a newspaper clipping in the office detailing how the once Olympic hopeful Diane underwent a botched gender reassignment surgery and was disqualified from the Olympics due to her testing positive for a significant amount of male sex hormones. Realizing Annie has discovered her ruse, Diane—now speaking in a lower register—attacks her, revealing her motive to disqualify the competitors out of jealousy. Diane chases Annie into the gymnasium and climbs onto a painter's scaffold in the rafters, from which Annie manages to push her off. Diane falls onto a table in the gymnasium, where she is impaled to death by a competitor trophy.

== Cast ==
- Sally Kirkland as Diane Paine
- Lynn Banashek as Annie Rivers
- Sean Masterson as Phil Dandridge
- Michael O'Leary as Frank Agee
- Teal Roberts as Lynn Fox
- Spice Williams-Crosby as Coach Drew
- Melissa Prophet as Nancy Wilson
- Angela Bennett as Sue Allen Baines
- Nicholas Love as Joe Ward
- Lauretta Murphy as Shelly
- Michael Elliot as Dr. Jordine
- Christopher Mankiewicz as Coach Jack Webber
- Ed Call as Mr. Burger
- Mel Klein as Annie's Father
- Linnea Quigley as Athlete

== Soundtrack ==
The song "Take it All the Way" was composed for the film by Shuki Levy. The song was written by Levy and his then-wife, Dallas writer Deborah Shelton.

== Production ==
The film was shot in Los Angeles under the working title The Killing Touch.

== Release ==
The film was released in the United States in the first quarter of 1984 by Impact Films, and was subsequently released on VHS by Media Home Entertainment as both Fatal Games and, an alternate title, Olympic Nightmare. On September 22, 2023, it was announced Vinegar Syndrome would release the film to Blu-ray on Black Friday of that year.

=== Critical response ===
British review site Hysteria Lives! wrote a mixed review, stating that "Fatal Games is a real cheap production- but still not as cheap as the video extravaganzas of later years. For much of its running time it has the production values, editing and acting of bad porno- complete with a farting synth score", while praising the kills and climax, saying it was "fun" in a strictly campy way. BleedingSkull.com wrote a mixed review, criticizing the film as "unconcerned with the concepts of reality and filmmaking aptitude" but still "anything but" average. On a more positive note, Starburst editor Alan Jones opined that "it shows a level of competence and professionalism unusual for this lower end of a now overpopulated genre. The basic promise is a good one and reveals yet another way of how an aware filmmaker can get acres of flesh on screen without it seeming all a tired cliche."

=== Home media ===
Vinegar Syndrome released the film for the first time on Blu-ray as part of their Black Friday online flash sale on November 24, 2023.
