= High Stakes (1989 film) =

- Directed by: Amos Kollek
- Written by: Amos Kollek
- Cinematography: Marc Hirschfeld
- Music by: Mira J. Spektor
- Release date: October 9, 1989
- Running time: 102 minutes

High Stakes (also known as Melanie Rose) is a 1989 thriller-drama film starring Sally Kirkland and features Sarah Michelle Gellar in a supporting role. Kathy Bates also has a minor role.

== Plot ==
A lonely stockbroker looking for intimacy on Wall Street ends up helping a prostitute and her daughter in trouble with a crime boss.

== Cast ==
- Sally Kirkland as Bambi/Melanie Rose
- Sarah Michelle Gellar as Karen Rose
- Richard Lynch as Slim
- Kathy Bates as Jill
- Robert LuPone as John Stratton
