= The Georgia Peaches =

- Also known as: Follow That Car
- Genre: Comedy
- Written by: Mick Benderoth; Monte Stettin; William Hjortsberg
- Directed by: Daniel Haller
- Starring: Dirk Benedict; Tanya Tucker; Terri Nunn; Lane Smith
- Music by: R. Donovan Fox
- Country of origin: United States
- Original language: English

Production
- Executive producer: Roger Corman
- Producers: James Sbardellati; Thomas M. Hammel
- Production locations: Charleston, South Carolina; Johns Island, South Carolina; Walterboro, South Carolina
- Cinematography: David Sanderson
- Editor: Sandy Nervig
- Running time: 100 minutes
- Production company: New World Pictures

Original release
- Network: CBS
- Release: November 8, 1980

The Georgia Peaches (also known as Follow That Car) is a 1980 American made-for-television action-adventure comedy film produced by Roger Corman as a pilot for a proposed television series. It starred Tanya Tucker, Terri Nunn and Dirk Benedict as three friends extorted into becoming undercover FBI agents. The film was broadcast on CBS on November 8, 1980.

== Plot ==
The exploits of two sisters – Lorette Peach (Tucker), a country-western singer and Sue Lynn Peach (Nunn), owner of the Georgia Peaches Garage, and Dusty Tyree (Benedict), a stock car racer – as three friends recruited as undercover agents by the U.S. Treasury Department. In the pilot, they attempt to break up a ring of cigarette bootleggers operating out of their home state of Georgia.

== Cast ==
- Tanya Tucker as Lorette Peach
- Terri Nunn as Sue Lynn Peach
- Dirk Benedict as "Dusty" Tyree
- Lane Smith as Randolph Dukane
- Sally Kirkland as Vivian Stark
- Dennis Patrick as Wade Holt
- David Hayward as Joe Don Carter
- Burton Gilliam as Delbert Huggins
- Noble Willingham as Jarvis Wheeler

== Home media ==
The Georgia Peaches was released on DVD by Shout! Factory as part of "Roger Corman's Cult Classics" Triple Feature Action-Packed Collection series on April 5, 2011.
