= Spice Williams-Crosby =

American actress

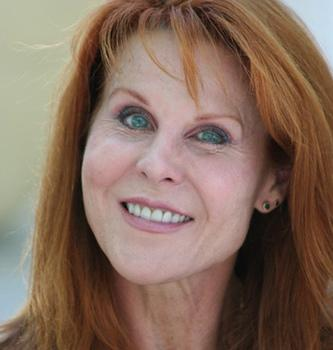
- Born: North Hollywood, Los Angeles, California, U.S.
- Occupations: Actress, stunt performer
- Years active: 1974–present
- Spouse(s): Gregory Crosby (m. 1989); Charles Fassert (m. 1982 div. 1989)
- Children: 1

Spice Williams-Crosby is an American actress, with a career in film and television which spans more than 40 years.

== Biography ==
Williams-Crosby was born in North Hollywood, Los Angeles, California. Her more notable roles include the Klingon officer Vixis in Star Trek V: The Final Frontier, and the assassin Patrice in Buffy the Vampire Slayer story "What's My Line". Originally involved in music and dance, she switched to acting, focusing on action roles which often featured stuntwork, making use of her martial arts and athletic skills. She has also worked as a stunt coordinator, choreographing fight scenes for television and film, including Miller Lite's controversial 2002 commercial "Catfight".

Williams-Crosby took up personal fitness at the age of 26, including bodybuilding and nutrition. She has written a book and several articles on fitness and veganism.

She is married to screenwriter/film producer Gregory Crosby (Hacksaw Ridge); the couple have one son, Luke Gregory.

== Selected filmography ==
=== Film ===
- 1984 Fatal Games
- 1987 Stranded
- 1989 Star Trek V: The Final Frontier
- 1991 The Guyver (stunts)
- 1992 Sleepwalkers (stunts)
- 1994 T-Force
- 1996 From Dusk till Dawn (stunts)
- 1996 The Cherokee Kid
- 1997 Liar Liar (stunts)
- 1999 Galaxy Quest
- 2002 Spider-Man (stunts)
- 2003 The Singing Detective
- 2004 Million Dollar Baby
- 2007 Mission: Impossible III (stunts)
- 2008 Room and Board
- 2010 The Dead Undead
- 2016 Reach Me
- 2024 Boneyard

=== Television ===
- 1984 Getting Physical
- 1987 Mama's Family
- 1988 Out of This World
- 1993 Star Trek: Deep Space Nine
- 1996 7th Heaven
- 1997 Buffy the Vampire Slayer
- 1997 Seinfeld
- 1999 Diagnosis: Murder
- 2003 Angel
- 2004 Days of Our Lives
- 2007 Scrubs
- 2005 Charmed
- 2008 Terminator: The Sarah Connor Chronicles
- 2016 Comedy Get Down
