= She Cried Murder =

- Genre: Thriller
- Teleplay by: Merwin Gerard
- Story by: A. Roy Moore; Peter Jobin
- Directed by: Herschel Daugherty
- Starring: Telly Savalas; Lynda Day George; Mike Farrell; Kate Reid
- Music by: John Cacavas
- Country of origin: United States
- Original language: English

Production
- Producer: William Frye
- Production location: Toronto, Ontario
- Cinematography: Harry Makin
- Editors: Bud Hoffman; John Kaufman
- Running time: 74 minutes
- Production company: Universal Television

Original release
- Network: CBS
- Release: September 25, 1973

She Cried Murder is a 1973 American TV film starring Telly Savalas and Lynda Day George.

== Plot ==
A model witnesses a murder on the subway, and one of the cops investigating is the one who did it. And he knows she knows, and she knows he knows she knows. It becomes a cat-and-mouse game of one trying to stay ahead of the other, who eventually becomes willing to use any means to keep her quiet.

== Cast ==
- Telly Savalas as Inspector Joe Brody
- Lynda Day George as Sarah Cornell
- Mike Farrell as Detective Walter Stepanic
- Kate Reid as Maggie Knowlton
- Len Birman as Marvin
- Jeff Toner as Chris Cornell
- Murray Westgate as Sergeant Withers
- Robert Goodier as Chief McKenzie
- Richard Alden as 2nd Policeman
- Aileen Seaton as Sister Maria Theresa
- B. Hope Garber as Mrs. Brody
- Stu Gillard as TV Director

== Location ==
The movie was filmed in Toronto, and features many downtown locations including scenes shot at the University of Toronto Victoria College, the Winter Garden Theatre, Ontario Place, on the Toronto Transit Commission subway system (including at Osgoode Station with its original appearance), and at the TTC's Davisville Yard.
