= The Haunted (1991 film) =

- Print ad
- Genre: Horror film
- Based on: The Haunted: One Family's Nightmare by Robert Curran, Jack Smurl, Janet Smurl, Ed Warren, and Lorraine Warren
- Written by: Darrah Cloud
- Directed by: Robert Mandel
- Starring: Sally Kirkland; Jeffrey DeMunn
- Composer: Richard Bellis
- Country of origin: United States
- Original language: English

Production
- Executive producer: Bohdan Zachary
- Producer: Daniel Schneider
- Production location: Los Angeles
- Cinematography: Michael D. Margulies
- Editor: Farrel Levy
- Running time: 100 minutes
- Production company: FNM Films

Original release
- Network: Fox Network
- Release: May 6, 1991

The Haunted is a 1991 American made-for-television haunted house film directed by Robert Mandel and starring Sally Kirkland, who received a Golden Globe nomination for her performance. The film depicts the events surrounding the Smurl haunting.

== Plot ==
Janet Smurl and her family move into an old duplex in the town of West Pittston, Pennsylvania, which is rumored to be haunted. Indeed, soon family members begin to experience a variety of threatening phenomena. Strange human shadows wandering around the house, ominous sounds coming through the night, a stench spreading through the house, stains appearing on their own on the walls. But Janet cannot come to terms with the fact that something is persistently forcing the family to leave the house. Eventually, Janet turns to paranormal investigators, the Warren's for help, who know a lot more about the supernatural.

== Cast ==
- Sally Kirkland as Janet Smurl
- Jeffrey DeMunn as Jack Smurl
- Louise Latham as Mary Smurl
- George D. Wallace as John Smurl
- Joyce Van Patten as Cora Miller
- Stephen Markle as Ed Warren
- Diane Baker as Lorraine Warren
- Cassie Yates as Dorie Hayden
- John O'Leary as Father Larson
- Hope Garber as Aunt Lily
- Benj Thall as Kid
- Claudette Roche as Reporter #2
- John Asher as Joe
- Allison Barron as Katie
- Krista Murphy as Colleen
- Ashley Bank as Shawn
- Michelle Collins as Erin

== Reception ==
The film received a 61% Popcornmeter rating on Rotten Tomatoes

== Awards and nominations ==
Award	Category	Subject	Result
Golden Globe Award	Best Actress – Miniseries or Television Film	Sally Kirkland	Nominated
Primetime Emmy Award	Outstanding Cinematography for a Limited Series or Movie	Michael D. Margulies	Nominated
