= Altered Perceptions =

- Directed by: Jorge Ameer
- Written by: Wayne Dees
- Produced by: Jorge Ameer; Wayne Dees; Mauricio Arrioja
- Starring: Oran Stainbrook
- Cinematography: Zack Yan
- Edited by: Jorge Ameer
- Release date: May 21, 2023 (Cannes)
- Running time: 120 minutes
- Country: United States
- Language: English

Altered Perceptions is a 2023 American science fiction psychological horror thriller film written by Wayne Dees, directed by Jorge Ameer and starring Oran Stainbrook.

== Cast ==
- Oran Stainbrook as Alex Feretti
- Matt Fling as Dr. Joseph Feretti
- Vincent Giovanni as Peter Cardenas
- Joseph DeMatteo as Gary Becker
- Danny Fehsenfeld as Senator Ted DeMarcos
- Eric Roberts as John Cooper
- Sally Kirkland as Theresa Morgan

== Release ==
The film premiered at the Cannes Film Festival on May 21, 2023.

== Reception ==
The film has a 44% rating on Rotten Tomatoes based on nine reviews. Bobby LePire of Film Threat scored the film a 9.5 out of 10.

Siddhant Adlakha of Variety gave the film a negative review and wrote, “With its points about extremism and misinformation made early on, it all but trudges through its plot with outstretched, repetitive exchanges likely to force even its most forgiving viewers to mentally check out.”
