= Cold Feet (1989 film) =

1989 film by Robert Dornhelm

- Directed by: Robert Dornhelm
- Written by: Thomas McGuane; Jim Harrison
- Produced by: Cassian Elwes
- Starring: Keith Carradine; Sally Kirkland; Tom Waits
- Music by: Tom Bahler
- Distributed by: Avenue Pictures
- Release date: May 19, 1989
- Running time: 94 minutes
- Country: United States
- Language: English
- Budget: $3-4 million
- Box office: $289,975

Cold Feet is a 1989 comedy film directed by Robert Dornhelm. It stars Keith Carradine, Tom Waits, Bill Pullman, Sally Kirkland and Rip Torn.

== Plot ==
Kenny, a psychotic killer with mommy issues, Monte, a charming crooked cowboy, and Maureen, Monte's beautiful oversexed wife-to-be, steal some jewels and smuggle them across the border surgically implanted inside a horse. Monte turns out to be not a sharing or marrying type of person. He saddles up, steals the horse and the jewels, and heads for his brother's ranch in Montana, where his brother and sister-in-law do not fully trust him. When Kenny and Maureen realize what Monte has done with the horse and jewels they set off in hot pursuit of him.

== Cast ==
- Keith Carradine as Monte Latham
- Sally Kirkland as Maureen
- Tom Waits as Kenny
- Bill Pullman as Buck Latham
- Kathleen York as Laura
- Rip Torn as Sheriff
- Jeff Bridges as bartender
- Macon McCalman as store owner

== Release ==
Cold Feet was released in theatres on May 19, 1989.

== Reception ==
The New York Times praised the film calling it "wonderfully refreshing." Time Out called the film "Utterly crazed, utterly charming."

More negatively, Deseret News said the film tried to have "quirky charm" but instead was "forced and annoying."
