= In the Heat of Passion =

1992 film

- Directed by: Rodman Flender
- Written by: Rodman Flender
- Produced by: Rodman Flender executive Roger Corman
- Starring: Sally Kirkland; Nick Corri
- Distributed by: Concorde Pictures
- Release date: January 24, 1992
- Running time: 102 mins
- Country: USA
- Language: English

In the Heat of Passion is a 1992 American erotic thriller film written and directed by Rodman Flender and starring Sally Kirkland, Nick Corri and Michael Greene. It features early appearances of comedians Lisa Kudrow and Michael McDonald. The film was released on January 24, 1992 by Concorde Pictures.

== Cast ==
- Sally Kirkland as Lee Adams
- Nick Corri as Charlie Bronson
- Michael Greene as Sanford Adams
- Carl Franklin as Police Det. Rooker

== Sequel ==
A sequel, called In the Heat of Passion II: Unfaithful was directed by Catherine Cyran and was released in 1994 by New Concorde. It starred Barry Bostwick, Lesley-Anne Down, Teresa Hill, Michael Gross and Robin Riker.
