= CUCC =

CUCC may refer to:

- CUCC, a common abbreviation used by the following Cambridge University clubs:
  - Cambridge University Caving Club
  - Cambridge University Chamber Choir
  - Cambridge University Cricket Club
- .cu.cc, a second level domain under the .cc ccTLD hierarchy
