= Cuck (film) =

2019 film

- Promotional release poster
- Directed by: Rob Lambert
- Written by: Rob Lambert; Joe Varkle
- Produced by: Rob Lambert; Joe Varkle
- Starring: Zachary Ray Sherman; Sally Kirkland; Timothy V. Murphy; Monique Parent
- Cinematography: Nick Matthews
- Edited by: Mac Nelsen
- Music by: ROOM8
- Production company: Rimrock Pictures
- Distributed by: Gravitas Ventures
- Release dates: March 28, 2019 (CIFF); October 4, 2019 (United States)
- Running time: 115 minutes
- Country: United States
- Language: English
- Box office: N/A

Cuck is a 2019 American thriller film directed by Rob Lambert from a screenplay by Lambert and Joe Varkle. It stars Zachary Ray Sherman, Timothy V. Murphy, Sally Kirkland and Monique Parent.

The film had its world premiere at the Cleveland International Film Festival on March 28, 2019, and it was released on October 4, 2019.

== Plot ==
Ronnie, a loner who lives with his possessive mother, is deemed unfit for military service due to his history of mental instability and petty crime. Retreating into the world of extremist internet groups, he creates a vlog channel, from which he decries what he describes as the downfall of "real America". Meanwhile, prompted by sexual frustration, he agrees to play the role of cuckold in a couple's homemade amateur pornography, for which he is financially compensated. He buys an unregistered handgun and begins to spend time at firing ranges. He meets his online idol, a charismatic leader of the alt-right. However, when his identity as a "cuck" emerges, his macho persona is destroyed. Facing online shaming, Ronnie takes solace in his gun, which he regards as the only symbol of masculinity he has left.

== Cast ==
- Zachary Ray Sherman as Ronnie Palicki
- Sally Kirkland as Mother
- Monique Parent as Candy
- Timothy V. Murphy as Bill
- David Diaan as Abbas

== Production ==
=== Development ===
Following several collaborative screenwriting projects, Lambert and Varkle set out to produce a feature film. Beginning in 2016, they outlined several projects that would support a close character study of an isolated individual. Inspired by headlines of mass shooters brainwashed by online hate groups, they opted to tell an "angry young man" story. The filmmakers researched online communities of self-described "red pillers" and "incels" in order to make their character realistic and relatable.

Lambert and Varkle began writing the screenplay in May 2017. The first draft was completed in July 2017; the script was submitted to the Black List in September 2017. The script received polarized reviews, with many critics divided over its frank portrayal of hate and sexuality. Lambert and Varkle were later interviewed by the Black List after the film began production.

=== Casting ===
Lambert and Varkle screened actors who could balance vulnerability with volatility, ultimately settling on Zachary Ray Sherman, who gained 45 lb (20 kg) for the role.

== Release ==
On June 19, 2019, it was announced that Gravitas Ventures had acquired the North American distribution rights for the film. The film was officially released in select theaters and through video on demand services on October 4, 2019.

== Reception ==
=== Critical response ===
On Rotten Tomatoes, the film holds an approval rating of 44% based on 16 reviews, with an average of 4.8/10. On Metacritic, the film has a weighted average score of 40 out of 100, based on five critics, indicating "mixed or average" reviews.

Variety praised the "strong performances and atmosphere" of the film but described Cuck as an "overlong" and "downbeat drama" with a "contrived" plot. The Guardian writer Charles Bramesco favored Cuck to Todd Phillips' 2019 film Joker, calling it "more repellent, honest and astute than this week's odds-on box office champion." The New York Times panned the film as "an ugly . . . and self-congratulatory wallow."

=== Commercial response ===
The box office figures for Cuck have not been reported.
