= Sally Kirkland =

American actress and producer (1941–2025)

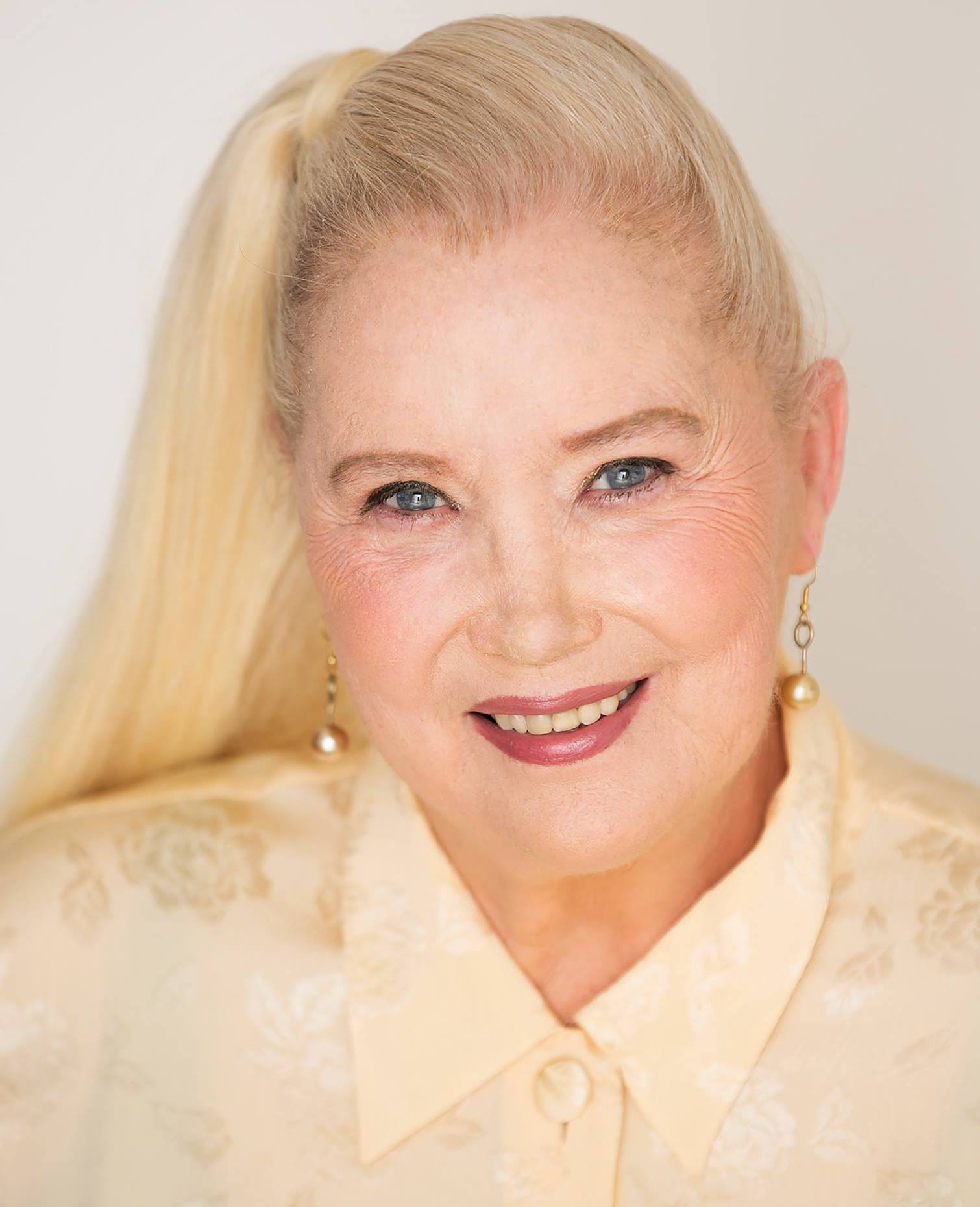
- Kirkland in 2014
- Born: October 31, 1941; New York City, U.S.
- Died: November 11, 2025 (aged 84); Palm Springs, California, U.S.
- Education: Actors Studio; American Academy of Dramatic Arts
- Occupations: Actress; producer
- Years active: 1962–2025
- Spouses: Michael R. Jarrett (m. 1974; div. 1975) Mark Hebert (m. 1985, divorced)
- Mother: Sally Kirkland
- Awards: Awards

Sally Kirkland Jr. (October 31, 1941 – November 11, 2025) was an American actress and producer. A one-time member of Andy Warhol's The Factory, she was a part of 1960s New York avant-garde theater. She appeared in more than 250 film and television productions during a 60-year career. Kirkland was the daughter of Sally Kirkland, fashion editor of Life and Vogue.

Kirkland garnered widespread critical acclaim for her eponymous performance as a former popular actress in the independent comedy-drama Anna (1987), which earned her the Golden Globe Award for Best Actress in a Motion Picture – Drama and a nomination for the Academy Award for Best Actress. She also won the Independent Spirit Award for Best Female Lead and the Los Angeles Film Critics Association Award for Best Actress for her performance in the film.

Kirkland was nominated for a Golden Globe Award for Best Actress – Miniseries or Television Film for her performance in the horror film The Haunted (1991). She was also known for her roles in Best of the Best (1989), JFK (1991), and Bruce Almighty (2003).

== Early life ==
Kirkland was born in New York City on October 31, 1941, to Sally (née Phinney), an Oklahoma-born fashion editor for Vogue and Life magazines, and Frederic McMichael Kirkland, a scrap metals merchant from Philadelphia.

Standing at 5 feet 10 inches (1.78 m) tall, Kirkland began her career as a model. She also worked as a go-go dancer at the Peppermint Lounge in Los Angeles before studying acting at the Actors Studio with Lee Strasberg and Uta Hagen. Notably, Robert De Niro dated one of her roommates. Kirkland graduated from the American Academy of Dramatic Arts in Los Angeles in 1961.

== Career ==
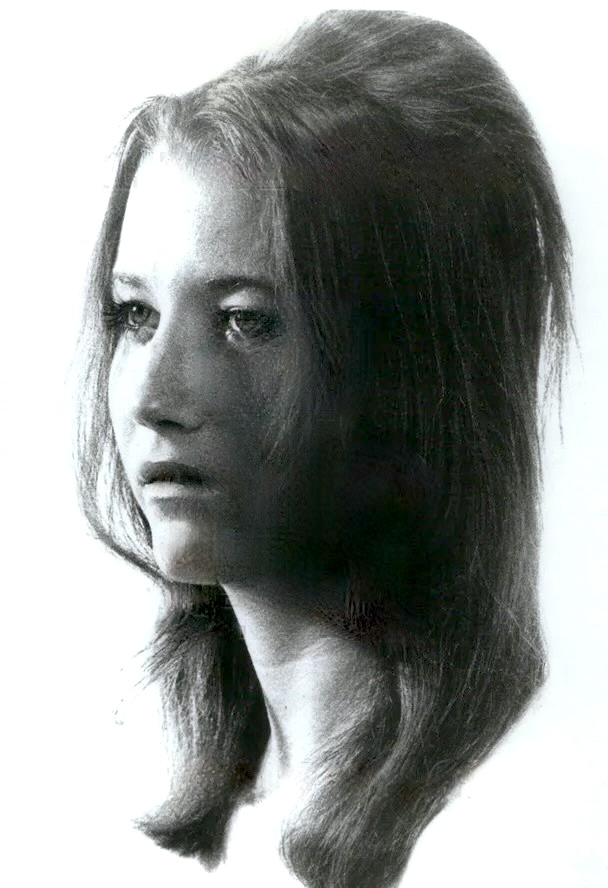
Kirkland in a 1970 publicity headshot

=== 1962–1986: Initial work ===
Kirkland began acting Off-Broadway in 1963. She joined Andy Warhol's The Factory and appeared nude while tied to a chair for 45 minutes in The 13 Most Beautiful Women., a 1964 drama film. By 1964, she was deeply involved in New York City's avant-garde movement. During that time, she was an active drug user until an attempted suicide frightened her into improving her life via yoga and painting. She returned to film in 1968, appearing in the western Blue and starred in the underground film Coming Apart (1969).

For the 1970s and most of the 1980s Kirkland had secondary roles in such films as Going Home (1971), The Young Nurses (1973), The Way We Were (1973), The Sting (1973), Big Bad Mama (1974), Crazy Mama (1975), Breakheart Pass (1975), Griffin and Phoenix: A Love Story (1976; U.S. made-for-television movie which was also released theatrically overseas), A Star Is Born (1976), and Private Benjamin (1980). She played a leading role in the 1984 horror film Fatal Games. Her television credits include guest-starring roles on Hawaii Five-O (as Betty Rowan, S6, Ep: Murder is a Taxing Affair), Police Story, The Rookies, Three's Company, Kojak, Starsky & Hutch, Charlie's Angels, and Falcon Crest.

=== 1987–1999: Critical acclaim and awards success ===
In 1987, Kirkland received widespread critical acclaim for her eponymous performance as a former popular actress in the independent comedy-drama Anna. The Washington Post deemed her performance "superb" and the Los Angeles Times rated her as one of the best actresses of the decade. She won the Golden Globe Award for Best Actress in a Motion Picture – Drama and the Independent Spirit Award for Best Female Lead, and was nominated for the Academy Award for Best Actress. In 1989, she appeared in the sports drama Best of the Best.

In 1990s, Kirkland starred in the action-comedy Bullseye! (1990) opposite Michael Caine, and played supporting roles in Revenge (1990), JFK (1991), Gunmen (1994), Excess Baggage (1997), and EDtv (1999). Kirkland also co-starred in the 1989/1990 genre films including Paint It Black, Cold Feet, High Stakes, and Two Evil Eyes, as well as starred in the 1992 erotic thrillers In the Heat of Passion and Double Threat, which were successful as home video releases. Her career shifted to the small screen during this time, appearing in lead roles in several made-for-television movies, and starring in the syndicated soap opera Valley of the Dolls in 1994. In 1990, she also played Truvy Jones in the television adaptation of Steel Magnolias. For her performance in the television film The Haunted (1991), Kirkland received a nomination for the Golden Globe Award for Best Actress – Miniseries or Television Film. She was a guest star on Roseanne, Murder, She Wrote, and The Nanny. In 1999, she had recurring roles in Felicity and Days of Our Lives.

=== 2000–2025: Later career ===
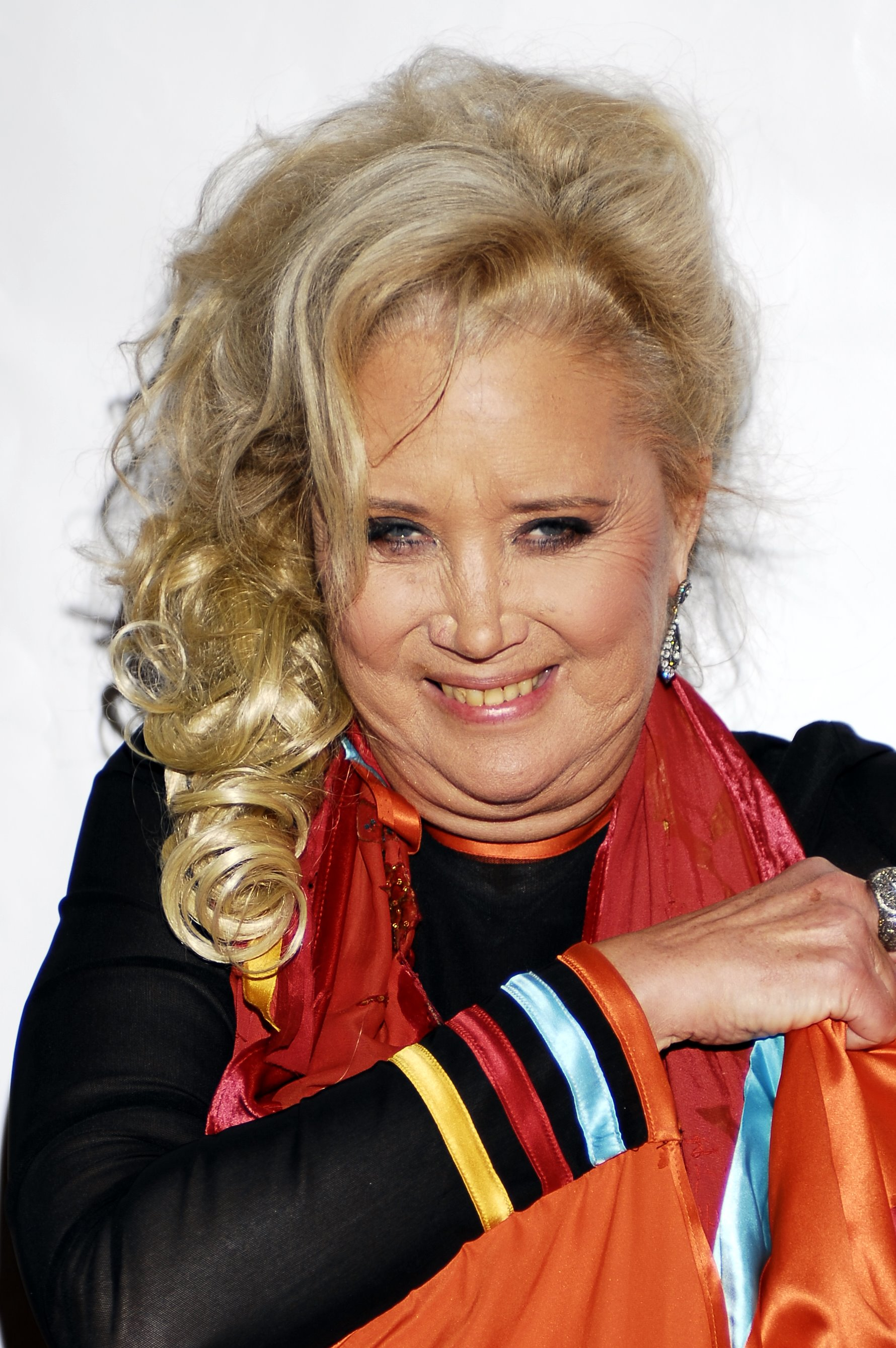
Sally Kirkland in 2007

In 2000s, she played supporting roles in films including Bruce Almighty (2003), Adam & Steve (2005), and Big Stan (2007). She hosted a weekly program on the syndicated HealthyLife Radio Network. In 2019, she starred in the film Cuck. In 2020, she had a leading role in Hope For The Holidays on Amazon Prime Video with Robert Lasardo, Doug Hutchison, Alex Cubis, and George Stults.

In 2024, Kirkland starred as herself in the independent comedy film, Sallywood, a parody about a longtime fan of the actress who becomes her assistant and helps her in her quest to return to red-carpet glory.

== Other work and activism ==
Kirkland was a health activist whose work included advocacy for women harmed by breast implants. She founded the Kirkland Institute for Implant Survival Syndrome in August 1998. She was an ordained minister in the church of Movement of Spiritual Inner Awareness.

She was a painter and a noted acting teacher whose students included Sandra Bullock, Barbra Streisand, Liza Minnelli, Dwight Yoakam, and Roseanne Barr, among others.

== Illness and death ==
Kirkland later suffered from dementia. According to a fund raiser for her medical care, she had suffered a fall in October 2025 which resulted in injuries to her ribs and foot. She died in hospice care in Palm Springs, California, the following month, on November 11, 2025, aged 84.

== Filmography ==
=== Film ===
Year	Title	Role	Notes	Ref.
1964	The 13 Most Beautiful Women	Beautiful Woman		
1968	Blue	Sara Lambert		
1969	Coming Apart	Joann		
1969	Futz	Merry Lee		
1970	Brand X	Patient/President's Wife		
1971	Jump	Lou	uncredited	
1971	Going Home	Ann Graham		
1973	Cinderella Liberty	Fleet Chick		
1973	The Sting	Crystal		
1973	The Way We Were	Pony Dunbar		
1973	The Young Nurses	Woman at clinic		
1974	Big Bad Mama	Barney's woman		
1974	Blazing Saddles	Cashier	uncredited	
1974	Candy Stripe Nurses	Wife in clinic		
1975	Bite the Bullet	Honey		
1975	Crazy Mama	Ella Mae		
1975	Breakheart Pass	Jane Marie		
1975	The Noah	Friday Anne	Voice role	
1976	Pipe Dreams	Two Street Betty		
1976	A Star Is Born	Photographer		
1977	Flush	Janet		
1979	Hometown U.S.A.	Gwen		
1980	Private Benjamin	Helga		
1980	The Georgia Peaches	Vivian Stark		
1981	The Incredible Shrinking Woman	Store cashier		
1982	Human Highway	Kathryn		
1984	Love Letters	Sally		
1984	Fatal Games	Diane Paine		
1987	Anna	Anna		
1989	White Hot	Harriet		
1989	Paint It Black	Maria Easton		
1989	Cold Feet	Maureen		
1989	Best of the Best	Kathryn Wade		
1989	High Stakes	Bambi / Melanie Rose		
1990	Two Evil Eyes	Eleonora	Segment: "The Black Cat"	
1990	Revenge	The Rock Star		
1990	Bullseye!	Willie		
1991	JFK	Rose Cheramie		
1992	In the Heat of Passion	Lee Adams		
1992	The Player	Herself		
1992	Forever	Angelica		
1992	Hit the Dutchman	Emma Flegenheimer		
1992	Primary Motive	Helen Poulas		
1992	Double Threat	Monica Martel		
1993	Paper Hearts	Jenny Stevenson	Alternate title: Cheatin' Hearts	
1993	Eye of the Stranger	Lori		
1993	Stringer	Joan		
1994	Gunmen	Bennett		
1995	Guns and Lipstick	Danielle Roberts		
1997	Amnesia	Charlene Hunt		
1997	Excess Baggage	Louise Doucette		
1997	Get a Clue	Sydelle Pulaski		
1998	Wilbur Falls	Roberta Devereaux		
1998	Paranoia	Dr. Kurtzwell		
1998	The Island	Marilyn Monroe		
1999	EDtv	Jeanette		
1999	Starry Night	Det. Brook Murphy		
2000	Norma Jean, Jack, and Me	Norma Jean		
2001	Thank You, Good Night	Doreen		
2001	Out of the Black	Elizabeth Malby		
2001	A Month of Sundays	Katherine St. Croix		
2001	Wish You Were Dead	Penelope Wilson		
2002	The Rose Technique	Helen		
2003	Bruce Almighty	Anita Mann		
2004	Mango Kiss	Emilia		
2004	Bloodlines	Joyce		
2005	Neo Ned	Shelly Nelson		
2005	Adam & Steve	Mary		
2005	What's Up, Scarlet?	Ruth Zabrinski		
2005	Chandler Hall	Sally		
2006	Off the Black	Marianne Reynolds		
2006	A-List	Olga		
2006	Fingerprints	Mary		
2006	Coffee Date	Mrs. Muller		
2007	Big Stan	Jury Madam Foreman		
2007	Resurrection Mary	Lois		
2007	Blind Spot	Penelope Denmore	Short	
2008	Richard III	Queen Margaret		
2008	Mollie & Friends (aka Oak Hill)	Elizabeth St. James		
2008	Bald	Mrs. Elise Stern		
2010	House Under Siege	Pat Mazur		
2010	Lights Out	Rose		
2011	The Last Gamble	Sally		
2011	The Wayshower	Jeena		
2011	The Wishmakers	Mary		
2011	Division III: Football's Finest	Crystal Vice		
2012	Archaeology of a Woman	Margaret		
2012	Broken Roads	Mrs. Wallace		
2012	Posey	Posey	Short film	
2013	Awakened	Harriet Bendi		
2013	The Visitor from Planet Omicron	Jen		
2014	Ron and Laura Take Back America	Sally		
2014	The Bride From Vegas	Suzy 'The Salt Shaker'		
2014	Suburban Gothic	Virginia		
2014	Tom in America	Betty	Short film	
2015	Buddy Hutchins	Bertha		
2016	The Code of Cain	Elisabeth		
2016	Courting Des Moines	Maxine Jackson		
2016	Trash Fire	Florence		
2016	Buddy Solitaire	Hanna		
2017	Making a Killing	Dolores		
2017	The Most Hated Woman in America	Lena Christina		
2017	Price for Freedom	Francine Wayne		
2017	Gnaw (Apartment 212)	Claudette		
2018	Get Married or Die	Margaret		
2018	The Second Coming of Christ	Stella		
2018	Los Angeles Overnight	Mrs. Chantilly		
2018	Sarah Q	Helena		
2018	Wally Got Wasted	Marilyn Tuttlebaum		
2019	Cuck	Mother		
2019	Paint It Red	Adele		
2020	Hell Hole	Dr. Parker		
2020	Hope for the Holidays	Georgia		
2020	Invincible	Dr. Quade		
2021	The Trouble	Ms. Greyson		
2021	The Legend of Resurrection Mary	Lois		
2022	Bobcat Moretti	Helene Moretti		
2023	When It Rings	Lesley Judd		
2023	Altered Perceptions	Theresa Morgan		
2023	80 for Brady	Ida		
2024	Skeltons in the Closet	Madam Futura		
2024	Aftermath	Dr. Jane Dunning		
2024	Sallywood	Sally Kirkland		

=== Television ===
Year	Title	Role	Notes
1965	New York Television Theatre	Barbara Fiers	Episode: "The Drapes Come"
1973	Hawaii Five-O	Betty Rowan	Episode: "Murder Is a Taxing Affair"
1974	Toma	Rita	Episode: "The Big Dealers"
1974‍–‍78	Kojak	Gloria/Shirley	2 episodes
1975	The Kansas City Massacre	Wilma Floyd	TV film
1975	Death Scream	Mary	TV film
1975	Bronk	Policewoman Haley / Billie	2 episodes
1975	Petrocelli	Joan Arnold	Episode: "Too Many Alibis"
1976	Baretta	Rita	Episode: "The Left Hand of the Devil"
1976	The Rookies	Carol Brenner	Episode: "From Out of the Darkness"
1976	Griffin and Phoenix	Jody	TV film
1976	Captains and the Kings	Aggie	Episode: "Chapter VIII"
1977	Stonestreet: Who Killed the Centerfold Model?	Della Bianco	TV film
1977	Three's Company	Sally	Episode: "Jack Looks for a Job"
1978	Starsky & Hutch	Greta Wren / Dora Pruitt	Episode: "Photo Finish"
1978	The Incredible Hulk	Margaret Hollinger	Episode: "A Child in Need"
1978	Lou Grant	Dr. Eilene Peterson	Episode: "Slaughter"
1979	Visions	Yvette	"Ladies in Waiting"
1979	Supertrain	Katherine Sully	"A Very Formal Heist"
1979‍–‍1981	Charlie's Angels	Lonnie/Laurie Archer	2 episodes
1980	Willow B: Women in Prison	Kate Stewart	TV film
1980	The Georgia Peaches	Vivian Stark	TV film
1982	Lou Grant	Vicky Doppler	Episode: "Law"
1982	Insight	Ruth	Episode: "So Little Time"
1983	Falcon Crest	Ella	2 episodes
1989	Trying Times	Agripina Gravanescu-Smith	Episode: "Death and Taxes"
1990	Heat Wave	Mrs. Canfield	TV film
1990	Steel Magnolias	Truvy Jones	TV film
1990	Largo Desolato	Suzana	TV film
1991	The Haunted	Janet Smurl	TV film
1992	The Ray Bradbury Theater	Mary Morris	Episode: "Zero Hour"
1992	Raven	Flori	Episode: "Flori and Dori"
1992	Double Jeopardy	Det. Phyllis Camden	TV film
1992‍–‍93	Roseanne	Barbara Healy	2 episodes
1993	The Woman Who Loved Elvis	Sandee Sloop	TV film
1993	Jack's Place	Peg	Episode: "Play It Again, Jack"
1993	Double Deception	Anita Cortez	TV film
1994	Valley of the Dolls	Helen Lawson	Main role
1995	Picture Windows	Blossom	Episode: "Song of Songs"
1995	Murder, She Wrote	Evelyn Colby	Episode: "The Scent of Murder"
1996	High Tide	Matilda	Episode: "The Curse of the High Tide"
1996	Goode Behavior	Molly	Episode: "Goode Golly, Miss Molly"
1996	The Nanny	Tattoo Lady	Episode: "Tattoo"
1997	Women: Stories of Passion	Annie	Episode: "Hotel Magic"
1997	The Hunger	Mrs. Garington	Episode: "Bridal Suite"
1997	Get a Clue	Sydelle Pulaski	TV film
1998	Brave New World	Linda	TV film
1999	Days of Our Lives	Tracey Simpson	Supporting role (22 episodes)
1999	Chicken Soup for the Soul	Wanda	Episode: "Simple Wooden Boxes"
1999	Felicity	Prof. Annie Sherman	Guest role (season 2)
2000	Another Woman's Husband	Roxie	TV film
2001	Strong Medicine	Stella Riggs	Episode: "Donors"
2001	Resurrection Blvd.	Mrs. De La Vega	Episode: "El Que Necesita"
2002	Night of the Wolf	Rose Handy	TV film
2002	Another Pretty Face	Sylvie Tucker	TV film
2005	Wanted	Sheila Beckwith	Episode: "The Promise of Darkness"
2007	The Simple Life: Goes to Camp	Herself	
2010	The Agency	Max	TV series
2010	Criminal Minds	May Walden	Episode: "Reflection of Desire"
2011	Paul Cruz: Latin Actor (A Mockuseries)	Sally Kirkland	3 episodes
2013	Bennington Gothique	Grand Wentworth (voice)	TV series
2014	Theatre Fantastique	Louisa Mae	Episode: "The Happy Home of the Murderous Mahones"
2014	All I Want for Christmas	Gwen	TV film
2015	40's and Failing	Flora	TV series
2017	Conversations in L.A.	Evelyn James	Episode: "First Step"
2017	Good Samaritans	Olivia De Mills	Episode: "What Do You Say We Get You a Puppy?"

== Awards and nominations ==
Award/association	Year	Category	Nominated work	Result	Ref.
Academy Awards	1988	Best Actress	Anna	Nominated	
California Independent Film Festival	1997	Best Actress	Blind Spot	Won	
DVD Exclusive Awards	2003	Best Supporting Actress	Wish You Were Dead	Nominated	
Fort Myers Beach Film Festival	2013	Best Actress	Posey	Won	
Golden Globe Awards	1988	Best Actress in a Motion Picture – Drama	Anna	Won	
Golden Globe Awards	1992	Best Actress – Miniseries or Television Film	The Haunted	Nominated	
Independent Spirit Awards	1988	Best Female Lead	Anna	Won	
La Femme International Film Festival	2005	Lifetime Achievement Award		Honored	
Long Island International Film Expo	2015	Best Actress	Tom in America	Won	
Los Angeles Film Critics Association	1988	Best Actress (shared with Holly Hunter for Broadcast News)	Anna	Won	
Madrid International LGBT Film Festival	2015	Special Mention (shared with Burt Young)	Tom in America	Won	
Maverick Movie Awards	2015	Best Actress: Short	Tom in America	Nominated	
Online Film & Television Association	1999	Best Supporting Actress in a Daytime Serial	Days of Our Lives	Won	
Queens World Film Festival	2016	Best Actress in a Short	Tom in America	Nominated	
Studio City Film Festival	2013	Best Actress: Short Film	Posey	Won	
Wild Rose Independent Film Festival	2013	Best Actress – Short Film	Posey	Won	

== See also ==
- List of American film actresses
- List of American television actresses
- List of actors with Academy Award nominations
- List of Golden Globe winners
