= So B. It =

2004 novel by Sarah Weeks

- Author: Sarah Weeks
- Language: English
- Series: None
- Genre: Realistic fiction
- Publisher: HarperCollins
- Publication date: 2004
- Publication place: America
- Pages: 245

So B. It is a 2004 children's novel written by Sarah Weeks. The story follows a young girl named Heidi as she embarks on a journey to uncover the mysteries of her family and her past, centered around her relationship with her mentally disabled mother. The novel has been recognized with several awards, including the Rebecca Caudill Young Reader's Book Award in Illinois and the William Allen White Children's Book Award in Kansas.

== Settings ==
- Reno, Nevada — Heidi's hometown
- Liberty, New York
- Fernley, Nevada
- Salt Lake City, Utah
- Lovelock, Nevada
- Rock Springs, Wyoming
- Cheyenne, Wyoming
- Des Moines, Iowa
- New York City, New York
- Monticello, New York

== Premise ==
Heidi is a twelve-year-old girl with a mentally disabled mother, but who is otherwise extremely lucky. She and her mother are taken care of by their next-door neighbour, Bernadette, after the two appeared at her door when Heidi was a newborn. Heidi has no information about her family, other than what her mother says through her 23-word vocabulary, including the word soof. Heidi sets out to discover her family's history and origins and travels on her own from Reno, Nevada, to Liberty, New York, to visit the group home in the photographs she discovered in her house.

== Characters ==
- Heidi DeMuth (originally known as Heidi It): The main character in the story. A twelve-year-old girl, she is kind, courageous, extremely lucky and determined.
- Sophia Lynne DeMuth (called Mama by Heidi; Soof by Elliot; Precious Bouquet or just Precious by Bernadette; and So Be It by herself): Heidi's mentally disabled mother. She is kind and loving, even though she has a very limited vocabulary and little ability to learn. She likes Jujyfruit candies but dislikes buses (see Diane DeMuth).
- Bernadette "Bernie" (called Dette by Sophia): Heidi's next-door neighbour who acts as mother or guardian to Heidi. She has agoraphobia.
- Alexander "Zander": An older boy who lives in Heidi's apartment building. Though gruff, Heidi enjoys his company because he tells outlandish stories that she likes to analyze for their truthfulness.
- Elliot Hill: Heidi's father and Sophia's best friend. He is also mentally disabled. Calls Sophia "soof" because he cannot pronounce "Sophia".
- Thurman Hill: Heidi's grandfather. He works at Hilltop Home, a place for the mentally disabled, where Heidi's mother lived for a year.
- Ruby Franklin: A Hilltop Home employee who helps Heidi with her quest and takes care of her for part of her journey. Her husband is Roy Franklin (see below).
- Roy Franklin: Ruby's husband, a local sheriff, helps Heidi find the truth about herself, as well as the meaning behind the word "soof".
- Diane DeMuth: Heidi's grandmother. She died when Heidi was born, in a bus accident, the reason Sophia is afraid of buses.
- Alice Wilinsky: The first person Heidi rides with on her way to Liberty. In response to Alice's prolonged discussion of her own extended family, Heidi invents a fantasy family life that includes answers to questions she is seeking to solve, but Alice knows that Heidi is lying and becomes disinterested in a continuing conversation.
- Georgia Sweet: An 18-year-old bound for college who joins Heidi for the next part of her bus trip. Unlike Alice Wilinsky, Georgia is more interested in Heidi than herself, and Heidi finds herself sharing her true story in detail.

== Film adaptation ==
The book was adapted into a film of the same name released in 2016, directed by Stephen Gyllenhaal, starring Talitha Bateman, Jessie Collins, Alfre Woodard, John Heard, Jacinda Barrett, Dash Mihok, and Cloris Leachman.

Awards
Preceded by The City of Ember	Winner of the William Allen White Children's Book Award; Grades 6–8; 2007	Succeeded by Airball: My Life in Briefs
