= So B. It (film) =

- Directed by: Stephen Gyllenhaal
- Written by: Garry Williams
- Based on: So B. It by Sarah Weeks
- Produced by: J. Todd Harris; Orien Richman
- Starring: Alfre Woodard; John Heard; Jessie Collins; Jacinda Barrett; Dash Mihok; Cloris Leachman; Talitha Bateman
- Cinematography: Patrick Murguia
- Edited by: Suzanne Spangler
- Music by: Nick Urata
- Production companies: Outside The Box Productions; Branded Pictures Entertainment
- Distributed by: Good Deed Entertainment
- Release dates: June 7, 2016 (Los Angeles Film Festival); April 2017 (United States)
- Running time: 98 minutes
- Country: United States
- Language: English

So B. It is a 2016 American drama film directed by Stephen Gyllenhaal and written by Garry Williams, based on the 2004 novel of the same name by Sarah Weeks. The film stars Talitha Bateman, Jessie Collins, Alfre Woodard, John Heard, Jacinda Barrett, Dash Mihok, and Cloris Leachman. It was released in April 2017 by Good Deed Entertainment.

== Plot ==
Heidi DeMuth is a 12-year-old girl who embarks on a journey to uncover the truth about her family. Heidi lives in Reno, Nevada, with her mentally disabled mother, Sophia, and their agoraphobic caretaker, Bernadette. Heidi discovers a roll of undeveloped film containing photographs of Sophia at a place called Hilltop Home in Liberty, New York. This discovery prompts Heidi to travel alone to New York to learn about her mother's past and the meaning of the word "soof," which is one of the few words Sophia can say.

During her journey, Heidi encounters several people who assist her along the way. On the bus to New York, Heidi meets Alice Wilinsky, an elderly woman who strikes up a conversation with her. Alice offers Heidi snacks and talks about her own family, but Heidi lies, saying she has family nearby. The brief encounter provides Heidi with some comfort and companionship, though she remains guarded about her past.

Later on, Heidi meets Georgia Sweet, a psychology student traveling to college. Georgia listens to Heidi’s story without judgment and offers support, though Heidi is reluctant to share too much. Georgia's kindness helps reassure Heidi as she continues her journey, and the brief encounter provides Heidi with emotional relief during the otherwise lonely trip.

Upon reaching Liberty, Heidi tries to gain access to Hilltop Home, where she is turned away. However, Roy Franklin, a local police officer, intervenes and offers to help. Roy takes Heidi into his home for the night and treats her with kindness, ensuring her safety and well-being. The next day, Roy helps Heidi meet Thurman Hill, the director of Hilltop Home, and facilitates her quest for answers about her family.

Ruby Franklin, Roy’s wife, also plays an important role in helping Heidi. Ruby, a former employee at Hilltop Home, recognizes Sophia in the photographs Heidi carries. She explains that Sophia had lived at Hilltop Home because of her mental disability and had a relationship with Elliot Hill, the mentally disabled son of Thurman Hill. Ruby reveals that Elliot is Heidi’s biological father, and this revelation helps Heidi understand her origins.

When Heidi meets Thurman Hill, he initially denies any connection to Sophia, but after Heidi insists, Thurman opens up. He reveals that Elliot is his son, making him Heidi’s grandfather. Thurman also explains that the word “soof” was Elliot’s way of pronouncing Sophia’s name, which she later adopted as part of her limited vocabulary. Thurman’s revelation helps Heidi understand the family connection and the significance of “soof.”

Finally, Heidi meets Elliot Hill, Thurman’s son. Elliot recognizes Heidi immediately and calls her “soof,” confirming their familial bond. Though Elliot’s speech is limited, his recognition provides Heidi with the final piece of the puzzle. She learns that Elliot is her biological father and that her journey has led her to understand her true lineage.

After uncovering the truth about her family, Heidi returns to Reno, where she reunites with Bernadette. The film concludes with Heidi having a deeper understanding of her background and the meaning behind the word “soof,” marking the end of her emotional and self-discovery journey.

== Cast ==
- Talitha Bateman as Heidi DeMuth
- Jessie Collins as Sophia Lynne DeMuth
- Alfre Woodard as Bernadette
- John Heard as Thurman Hill
- Michael Arden as Elliot Hill
- Jacinda Barrett as Ruby Franklin
- Dash Mihok as Roy Franklin
- Cloris Leachman as Alice Wilinsky
- Mataeo Mingo as Zander
- Luis Moncada as Zander's Dad

== Production ==
Principal photography on the film began on July 13, 2015 in Los Angeles.
