= The Nurse (2017 film) =

2017 American supernatural horror short film

- Directed by: Julian Terry
- Written by: Alexander Anderson; Julian Terry
- Produced by: Alexander Anderson; Julian Terry
- Starring: Aria Walters; Hannah Palazzi
- Cinematography: Will Weprin
- Music by: Alex Winkler
- Release date: August 16, 2017
- Running time: 2 minutes
- Country: United States
- Language: English

The Nurse is a 2017 American horror short film directed by Julian Terry. The film was written and produced by Alexander Anderson and Terry. The short film is made in the style of an entry in the Conjuring Universe and introduces a new demonic entity in the form of a nurse. The film stars Aria Walters and Hannah Palazzi and was released on YouTube on August 16, 2017. The short film was made in four days for a contest titled "My Annabelle Creation", in which it was one among five international winners.

== Plot ==
Emily, a young girl with bandages wrapped around her eyes, suddenly hears the door to her ward opening and the scraping sound of a gurney moving. As she goes outside to investigate, holding on to her drip for balance, a strange nurse approaches, whom Emily cannot see. Panicking, she gets back to her ward and hits the call button for help. The nurse appears and tells Emily in a normal voice that she can remove the bandaging. After the nurse does so, Emily turns around to see the nurse's disfigured, demonic face smiling back at her. Emily screams in horror, leaving her fate unknown.

== Cast ==
- Aria Walters as Emily
- Hannah Palazzi as The Nurse

== Release ==
The short film was submitted for a contest called "My Annabelle Creation". On August 17, 2017, David F. Sandberg announced the winner for the contest, which ended up being The Nurse.
