= Annabelle: Creation =

2017 American supernatural horror film

- Theatrical release poster
- Directed by: David F. Sandberg
- Written by: Gary Dauberman
- Produced by: Peter Safran; James Wan
- Starring: Stephanie Sigman; Talitha Bateman; Lulu Wilson; Anthony LaPaglia; Miranda Otto
- Cinematography: Maxime Alexandre
- Edited by: Michel Aller
- Music by: Benjamin Wallfisch
- Production companies: New Line Cinema; RatPac-Dune Entertainment; Atomic Monster; The Safran Company
- Distributed by: Warner Bros. Pictures
- Release dates: June 19, 2017 (LAFF); August 11, 2017 (United States)
- Running time: 110 minutes
- Country: United States
- Language: English
- Budget: $15 million
- Box office: $307 million

Annabelle: Creation is a 2017 American supernatural horror film directed by David F. Sandberg, written by Gary Dauberman and produced by Peter Safran and James Wan. It serves as a prequel to Annabelle (2014), the second installment in the Annabelle film series, and the fourth installment in The Conjuring Universe franchise. The film stars Stephanie Sigman, Talitha Bateman, Lulu Wilson, Anthony LaPaglia, and Miranda Otto, and depicts the possessed Annabelle doll's origin.

In October 2015, it was confirmed that an Annabelle sequel was in development; it was later revealed that the film would be a prequel rather than a sequel. Lights Out director David F. Sandberg replaced John R. Leonetti as director, with Dauberman returning to write the script and Safran and Wan returning to produce. Principal photography began on June 27, 2016, in Los Angeles, California, and concluded on August 15, 2016.

Annabelle: Creation premiered at the LA Film Festival on June 19, 2017, and was theatrically released in the United States on August 11, 2017. The film grossed $307 million worldwide and received generally positive reviews from critics. A sequel, Annabelle Comes Home, was released on June 26, 2019.

== Plot ==
A dollmaker named Samuel Mullins and his wife, Esther, grieve the loss of their seven-year-old daughter, Annabelle, nicknamed "Bee", who dies after accidentally stepping in front of a moving car.

Twelve years later, the Mullins open their home to provide shelter for Sister Charlotte and six girls who have been left homeless following the closure of their orphanage. Despite being warned to stay away from Bee's locked bedroom, Janice, a young orphan who is disabled by polio, discovers a note that reads "Find me" and sneaks into the room, which has mysteriously become unlocked. Inside, she finds a key to Bee's closet and uses it to open the door, discovering an eerie porcelain doll. Unwittingly, she releases a powerful demon that begins terrorizing the girls.

One night, the demon, taking on Bee's appearance, visits Janice and tells her that it wants her soul. Janice attempts to escape using a stairlift, but the demon reverses its direction and violently hurls her down to the ground floor, leaving her severely injured and dependent on a wheelchair. With Janice now confined to the first floor, her best friend, Linda, who must sleep alone, becomes the demon's next target.

One morning, the demon disguises itself as Sister Charlotte and wheels Janice into the old barn. There, it takes Bee's form, attacks Janice, and possesses her. Linda notices changes in Janice's behavior and tells Samuel that Janice had sneaked into Bee's bedroom and discovered the doll. Samuel immediately believes Linda and heads inside to investigate. He encounters a possessed Janice, who is now able to walk despite her injuries. Janice transforms and brutally attacks Samuel. He attempts to defend himself with a crucifix, but she breaks his fingers, forcing him to drop it. Outside, Sister Charlotte hears his screams and is horrified to discover his dead body.

That night, Linda sneaks outside and throws Janice's doll into the nearby well. A strange noise comes from the well, and Linda is almost dragged into it before Sister Charlotte manages to save her. When they return inside and discover that Janice is missing, Sister Charlotte wakes the other girls and sends them to search for her while she speaks with Esther, whose face has been disfigured and who remains confined to her bedroom.

Esther reveals that after Bee's death, she and Samuel prayed to any entity that could grant their wish to see their daughter again. An unknown entity answered their prayers, and although they briefly saw Bee's spirit, it eventually persuaded them to transfer its essence into one of Samuel's dolls. They agreed, only to realize that they had attracted a demon seeking a human host. One night, Esther witnessed Bee's spirit transforming into a demon, which then gouged out her eye. The couple subsequently enlisted the help of priests to bless their home and locked the doll inside Bee's closet. Eventually, they opened their house as a shelter for orphaned children in an attempt to repent for their actions. However, they unknowingly gave the demon another opportunity to find a human host. The demon then murders Esther and attacks Sister Charlotte. As the orphans attempt to escape the house, Linda becomes trapped and hides in Bee's bedroom. However, the possessed Janice finds her and tries to kill her. Sister Charlotte arrives in time to save Linda, locking Janice and the doll inside the closet before escaping the house.

The following day, the police arrive to search the property and discover only the doll, which they take away as evidence. Officers escort Sister Charlotte, Linda, and the other orphans as they leave to find a new home. However, Janice manages to escape through a hole in the closet wall and eventually relocates to an orphanage in Santa Monica. Still possessed by the demon, she becomes withdrawn and renames herself "Annabelle". A couple named Pete and Sharon Higgins eventually adopt her.

Twelve years later, after becoming involved in devil worship, a grown-up Annabelle returns home and murders her adoptive parents during the night. Their screams awaken their neighbor, Mia Form, who alerts her husband, John, after hearing the Higginses being attacked.

== Cast ==
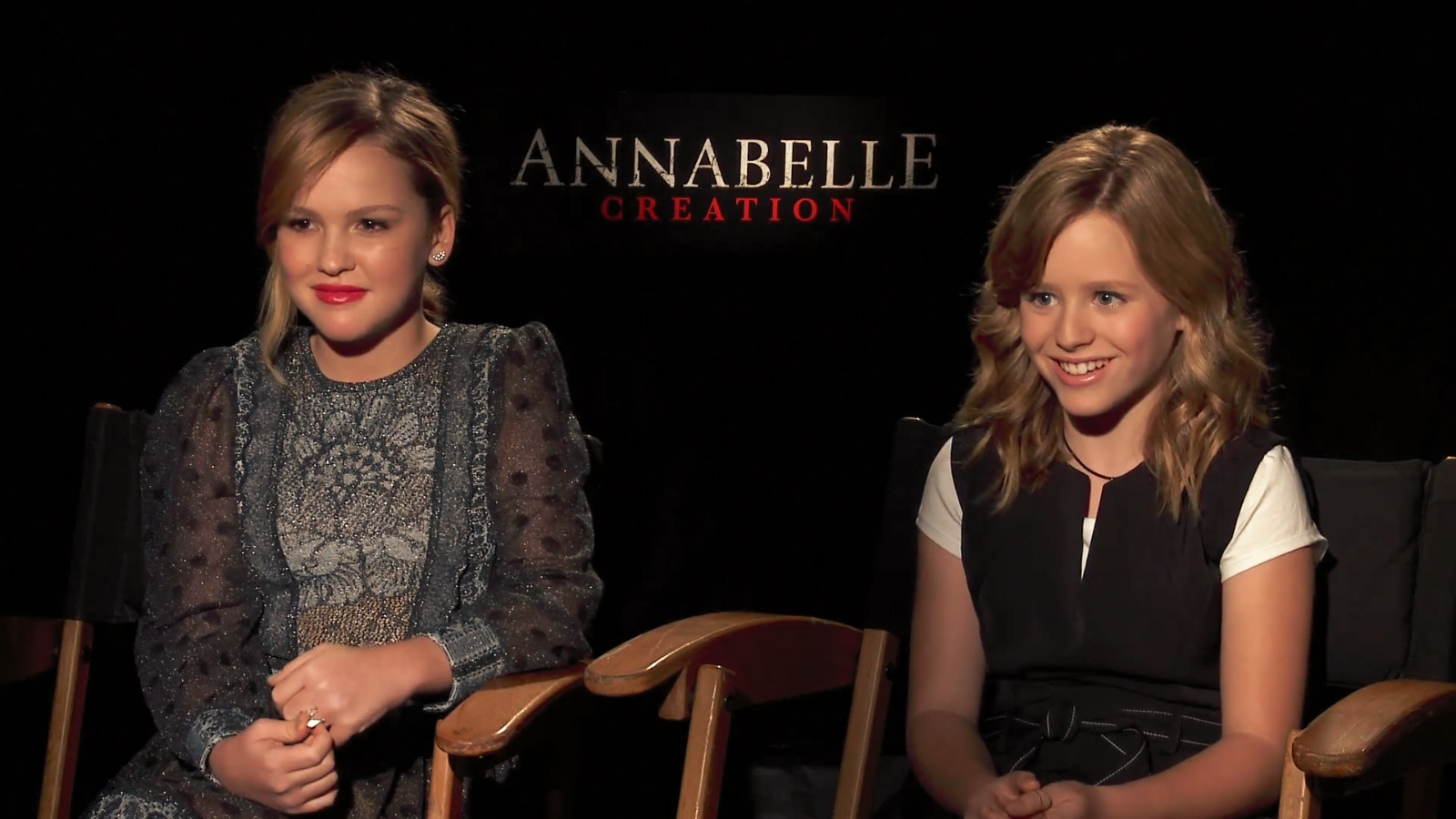
Talitha Bateman (left) and Lulu Wilson (right) discuss Annabelle: Creation in 2017

- Stephanie Sigman as Sister Charlotte
- Talitha Bateman as Janice
  - Tree O'Toole as grown-up Janice / Annabelle Higgins
- Anthony LaPaglia as Samuel Mullins
- Miranda Otto as Esther Mullins
- Lulu Wilson as Linda
- Grace Fulton as Carol
- Philippa Coulthard as Nancy
- Samara Lee as Annabelle "Bee" Mullins
- Tayler Buck as Kate
- Lou Lou Safran as Tierney
- Mark Bramhall as Father Massey
- Adam Bartley as Officer Fuller
- Lotta Losten as the adoption agent
- Joseph Bishara as the Annabelle Demon
  - Fred Tatasciore as the voice of the Annabelle Demon
- Brian Howe as Pete Higgins
- Kerry O'Malley as Sharon Higgins

Additionally, Annabelle Wallis and Ward Horton appear in archive footage from Annabelle as Mia and John Form, respectively, and Bonnie Aarons reprises her role from The Conjuring 2 as the demon nun Valak in an uncredited appearance.

== Production ==
=== Development ===
In October 2015, it was confirmed that an Annabelle sequel was in development. David F. Sandberg replaced Annabelle's John R. Leonetti as the sequel's director in March 2016. He has described himself as a fan of the franchise, especially the first one, since they were "more of a classic, old-school horror movie in many ways". James Wan and New Line Cinema approached Sandberg to helm the sequel during the post-production on Lights Out, after they were impressed by the early cuts of the film. Sandberg and Wan had met each other during production of Lights Out, as the movie was produced by Wan's Atomic Monster. Sandberg did not want to direct another formulaic horror sequel but, after reading the script and realizing how it deviated from the first film, he agreed to direct it. He was attracted to it as it was a standalone film, which granted him more creative freedom. The fact that it was a period piece made it more appealing to him. The first film's screenwriter, Gary Dauberman, returned to write the script, with Peter Safran and James Wan returning to produce. In March 2017, Sandberg revealed the film would be a prequel to the original Annabelle film, titled Annabelle: Creation.

Sandberg drew references from the look of the 1963 psychological horror film The Haunting, due to its use of CinemaScope cinematography, and cited the score of The Shining as the biggest inspiration for the film's chilling music. He also borrowed inspiration from the "old school" feel of The Conjuring. He decided he would rely upon tension and suspense as opposed to jump scares. Unlike his debut film Lights Out, in which he meticulously crafted each scene beforehand, Sandberg took a different approach to Annabelle: Creation. With Annabelle, he "was inspired by the set and moment" and so did not prepare with extensive storyboards or diagrams, instead relying on the mantra, "We'll figure it out on set together. We'll make it work."

Sandberg softened some of Annabelle's features to make her more believable as a child's toy, having the cheeks filled-out and fixing her overbite. He found shooting with the doll challenging since the object was immobile, and he needed to use other objects—such as a sheet—to make her move around. An exorcism expert, Father Robert, was a consultant on the film.

=== Casting ===
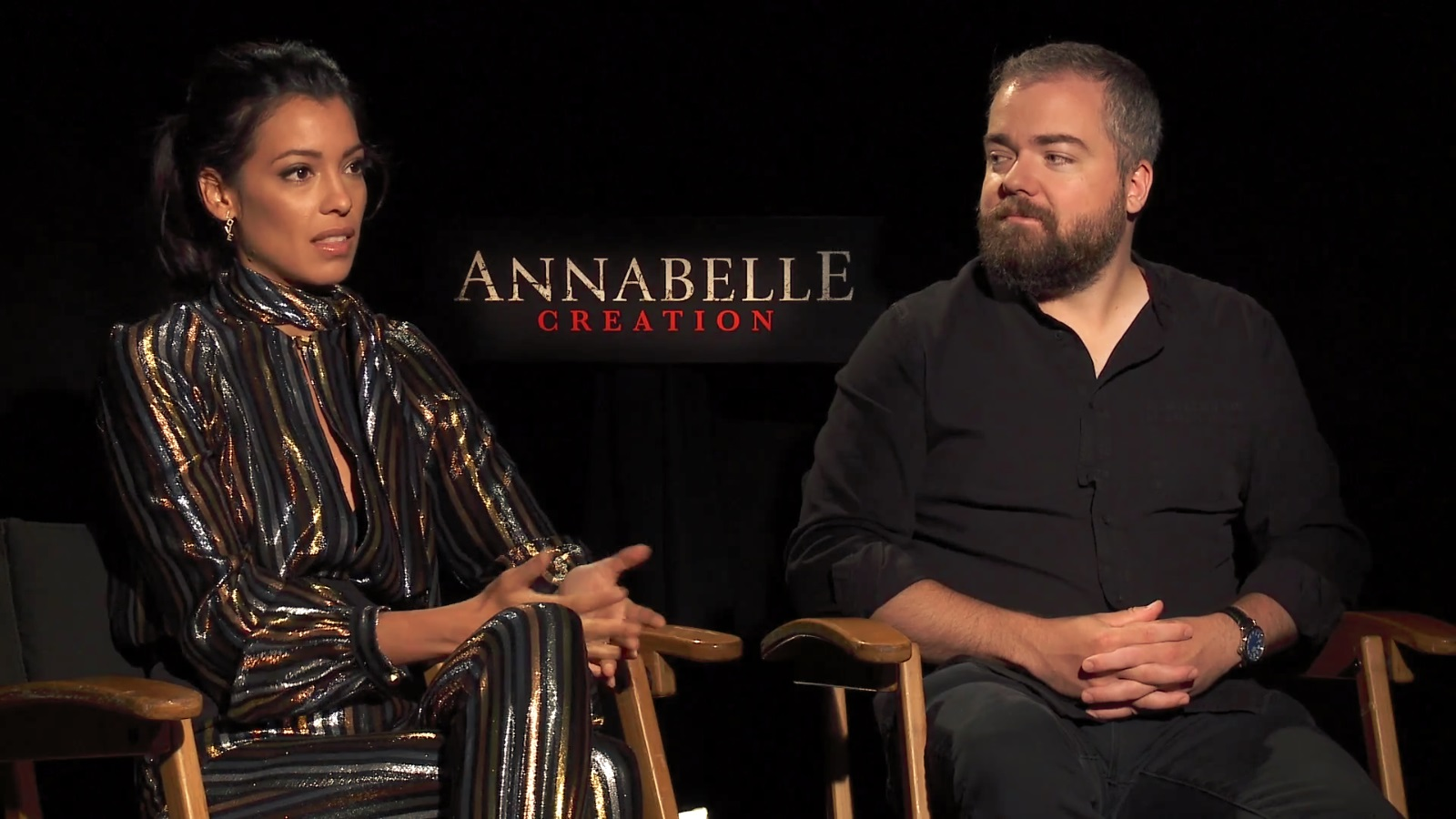
Stephanie Sigman and David F. Sandberg discuss Annabelle: Creation in 2017

In June 2016, Talitha Bateman, Miranda Otto, and Stephanie Sigman were cast to star in the film. Bateman and fellow child actresses Lulu Wilson and Samara Lee had all seen The Exorcist, and Samara was named after Samara Morgan from The Ring, so despite working on a horror movie, none of the young actresses were disturbed by the film's subject, although some of them did state that they were unsettled by the doll. They said that they did not feel tension or fear throughout production, and Sandberg remarked that the only challenge in working with them was restrictions in terms of hours on the set—such as they could not work after midnight or work overtime—since they were under age. Bateman was one of the actresses that James Wan had considered for the role of Janet in The Conjuring 2. However, the part eventually went to Madison Wolfe. Since the script demanded a group of children, they brought Bateman in to audition, having been impressed by her screen tests previously. Her brother, Gabriel Bateman, starred in Sandberg's Lights Out. Wilson auditioned for the role of Linda because she wanted to play a horror protagonist, having played an antagonist in Ouija: Origin of Evil. Creation marked her third time starring in a horror film, following Deliver Us from Evil and Ouija.

Anthony LaPaglia agreed to star in the film after his 14-year-old daughter overheard him talking on the phone about the movie and responded enthusiastically to her father taking the role. He has described his character as "a mysterious, quiet-yet-gruff man who is mourning both the loss of his daughter and the medical degeneration of his wife. The young orphans who move into the now-dilapidated house fear him." To get into character, he did not mingle with the young actresses very much on set. He would intentionally distance himself from them so that during filming they would naturally not like him very much.

=== Filming ===
Principal photography began on June 27, 2016, in Los Angeles, California, at the Warner Bros. Studios, Burbank lot, and concluded on August 15, 2016. The film received California film and television tax credits in the amount of $2.4 million after spending $17.4 million in the state. Sandberg decided to use Steadicam and tracking shots, because of the film's period setting, and he wanted to maintain the "old school" feel of the first two The Conjuring films. According to Sandberg, he does not believe in ghosts or demonic entities, saying, "I haven't experienced anything in life that would lead me to believe they exist". Sandberg reported that actress Stephanie Sigman, who played Sister Charlotte, was "a little bit freaked out by that doll" and, after hearing that a priest had blessed the set of The Conjuring 2, requested the same ritual be performed for this film.

=== Music ===
On November 23, 2016, Benjamin Wallfisch was hired to compose the music for the film.

== Marketing ==
=== My Annabelle Creation contest ===
In July 2017, Warner Bros. Pictures, in conjunction with James Wan, announced the "My Annabelle Creation" competition as promotion for the then-upcoming film Annabelle: Creation. Participants of the competition were to shoot a short film which would "feel like (it) could exist within the established Conjuring world", with the winning films' directors winning a trip to Los Angeles to meet with David F. Sandberg, the director of Annabelle: Creation, and a New Line Cinema's executive. The entry deadline was July 27, 2017, with five separate competition winners being selected from the United States (The Nurse), the United Kingdom (The Confession), Mexico (What's Wrong With Mom?), Sweden (Blund's Lullaby) and Colombia (Innocent Souls).

== Release ==
The film was originally set for release on May 19, 2017, but was pushed back to August 11, 2017, to avoid competition with Alien: Covenant. The film premiered at the Los Angeles Film Festival on June 19, 2017.

=== Home media ===
The film was released on Digital HD on October 17, 2017, and on Blu-ray and DVD on October 24, 2017. It was included in a May 2022 Blu-ray collection along with other The Conjuring Universe movies. WaterTower Music released the soundtrack album on August 4, 2017.

== Reception ==
=== Box office ===
Annabelle: Creation grossed $102 million in the United States and Canada and $205 million in other territories, for a worldwide total of $307 million, against a production budget of $15 million. With its release, it pushed The Conjuring franchise past the $1 billion threshold, making it only the third horror series to cross that mark, after the Alien franchise and Resident Evil series. Deadline Hollywood calculated the film made a net profit of $108.7 million, when factoring together all expenses and revenues.

In North America, the film was released alongside The Nut Job 2: Nutty by Nature and The Glass Castle, and was projected to gross around $30 million from 3,502 theaters in its opening weekend. The film grossed $4 million from its Thursday night previews, the highest of The Conjuring series and double the original Annabelle's $2.1 million. It went on to open to $35 million. In its second weekend, the film dropped 55.7% to earn another $15.5 million, which was a smaller second-weekend drop than Annabelle (57%) and The Conjuring 2 (63%), and the best second-weekend hold of the franchise since the initial Conjuring film (46%).

Outside North America, the film was released to positive reception from international audiences, which is reflected in its box office performance. It broke several opening records for the horror genre as well as for the studio and came in ahead of The Conjuring and Annabelle in many markets. The week prior to its domestic release, the film debuted in Italy at number one, with $1.1 million. It earned $35.4 million on its opening weekend from 39 markets, almost on par with its domestic debut and marking the second-biggest international opening in the franchise, behind only The Conjuring 2. Overall, the film was number two at the international box office after Wolf Warrior 2. The film expanded to 56 markets in its sophomore weekend, adding a handful of major markets and thereby topping the worldwide chart for the first time with an estimated $42 million.

It recorded the highest opening weekend in the franchise in 26 markets and the biggest launch for a horror film of all time in Sweden, Poland, Portugal, India, Malaysia ($2.2 million), the UAE ($1.1 million) and Vietnam. The top openings came from Mexico ($8 million), Korea ($6.7 million), and India ($9.8 million). In South Korea, the film grossed $1.2 million from Thursday previews. Despite its South Korean release falling during diplomatic tensions, it ultimately opened there with $6.7 million, as the number-one foreign release and the third-highest-grossing movie overall behind local films A Taxi Driver and Midnight Runners.

=== Critical response ===
The film received generally positive reviews from critics, who noted it as an improvement over its predecessor. On the review aggregator website Rotten Tomatoes, 71% of 190 critics' reviews are positive, with an average rating of 6.2/10. The website's consensus reads: "Annabelle: Creation adds another strong chapter to the Conjuring franchise - and offers further proof that freaky-looking dolls remain reliably terrifying." Metacritic, which uses a weighted average, assigned the film a score of 62 out of 100, based on 29 critics, indicating "generally favorable" reviews. Audiences polled by CinemaScore gave the film an average grade of B on an A+ to F scale, the same score earned by the first Annabelle film, while those at PostTrak gave it an average 4 out of 5 stars and a 56% "definite recommend".

Justin Lowe of The Hollywood Reporter called it "wickedly terrifying," and said it was "closer in tone and old-school psychological fright tactics to the original film than either The Conjuring 2 or Annabelle." Peter Debruge of Variety, while criticising the plot, said the film nevertheless "manages to conjure some effective scares," and that "this effective yet empty-headed horror movie goes to show how eager audiences are to be scared, and how even an unsightly doll can do the trick when the spirit is willing." Similarly, Chris Hewitt of Empire felt that while the "movie can't hold a flickering candle to the James Wan–directed entries in the series... it's got plenty of decent shocks, and the odd genuine surprise, up its sleeve". However, Emily Yoshida of Vulture wrote that "Annabelle: Creation's countless sequences of foreboding silence—hands reaching for doorknobs, our heroines shuddering in the dark, waiting for their demonic tormentor to attack—offer nothing to really latch on to, no larger reason to care that's not purely technical". Chris Nashawaty of Entertainment Weekly gave the film a "C" grade, calling it "a mishmash of clichés and nonsense" and writing that "none of this will seem new to horror fans".

=== Accolades ===
Year	Award	Category	Nominee(s)	Result
2017	Golden Trailer Awards	Best Horror	Annabelle: Creation	Nominated
2018	MTV Movie & TV Awards	Most Frightened Performance	Talitha Bateman	Nominated
2018	Saturn Awards	Best Horror Film	Annabelle: Creation	Nominated

== Sequel ==
In April 2018, Warner Bros. announced July 3, 2019, as the release date for an untitled new film in The Conjuring franchise. Later that month, it was announced that the film would be a third Annabelle film, with Gary Dauberman signed on to write and direct, in his directorial debut. James Wan and Peter Safran co-produced the project. In May 2019, the film's release date was changed to June 26, 2019.
