= Geostorm =

2017 science fiction film by Dean Devlin

- Theatrical release poster
- Directed by: Dean Devlin
- Written by: Dean Devlin; Paul Guyot
- Produced by: David Ellison; Dean Devlin; Dana Goldberg
- Starring: Gerard Butler; Jim Sturgess; Abbie Cornish; Alexandra Maria Lara; Daniel Wu; Eugenio Derbez; Ed Harris; Andy García
- Cinematography: Roberto Schaefer
- Edited by: Ron Rosen; Chris Lebenzon; John Refoua
- Music by: Lorne Balfe
- Production companies: Skydance; RatPac-Dune Entertainment; Electric Entertainment
- Distributed by: Warner Bros. Pictures
- Release dates: March 29, 2017 (Phoenix Film Festival): October 20, 2017 (United States)
- Running time: 109 minutes
- Country: United States
- Language: English
- Budget: $120–130 million
- Box office: $223.4 million

Geostorm is a 2017 American science-fiction action disaster film directed, co-written, and co-produced by Dean Devlin in his feature directorial debut. The film stars Gerard Butler, Jim Sturgess, Abbie Cornish, Ed Harris, and Andy García. It follows a satellite designer who tries to save the world from a storm of epic proportions caused by malfunctioning climate-controlling satellites.

Principal photography began on October 20, 2014, in New Orleans, Louisiana. After poor test screenings, reshoots took place in December 2016 under executive producer Jerry Bruckheimer, writer Laeta Kalogridis, and new director Danny Cannon. The film was the only co-production between Skydance Media and Warner Bros. Pictures until the acquisition of Warner Bros. Discovery by Paramount Skydance on October 6, 2026. (Note: Warner Bros. Pictures handled the film's international theatrical and worldwide physical home media release of Air (2023), which is produced by Skydance Sports; Amazon Studios handled the film's domestic theatrical release for that film.)

Geostorm was released in the United States on October 20, 2017, in all formats, and heavily underperformed at the box office, grossing only $223.4 million worldwide against a $120–130 million budget, losing Warner Bros. $71.6 million. The film was also widely panned by critics for its muddled storytelling, underdeveloped characters and lackluster visual effects.

== Plot ==
In 2019, following numerous catastrophic natural disasters, an international coalition commissions "Dutch Boy", a system of climate-controlling satellites. After it neutralises a typhoon in Shanghai, a US Senate subcommittee reprimands chief architect Jake Lawson for bringing Dutch Boy online without authorization. He is replaced by his brother Max, who works under US Secretary of State Leonard Dekkom. Three years later, a U.N. team in the Registan Desert discovers a frozen village. Mahmoud Habib, an Indian engineer working on the International Climate Space Station (ICSS), copies data from the satellite monitoring Afghanistan onto a hard drive before being killed in a supposed accident when window panels are blown off. After persuading US President Andrew Palma to investigate, Max convinces Jake to travel to the ICSS. Meanwhile, in Hong Kong, a satellite drastically raises temperatures, causes fire whirls and collapses several buildings; scientist Cheng Long survives.

Jake arrives at the ICSS and finds that the malfunctioning satellites have been damaged and their data erased after a robotic arm smashed them. Working with station commander Ute Fassbinder and her crew—engineer Eni Adisa, systems specialist and programmer Duncan Taylor, technician Al Hernández and security officer Ray Dussette—he recovers Habib's hard drive but conceals it, suspecting a traitor among the crew.

The data reveals that a virus has been introduced into the system, causing the malfunctions and erasing the login access of key personnel. Back on Earth, Cheng Long discovers that he and Max have lost their access and warns Max that continued failures could trigger a global cataclysm known as a "geostorm". Suspecting that Palma is using Dutch Boy as a weapon, Jake proposes rebooting the system to remove the virus, which requires a kill code held by Palma.

Cheng is pursued to Washington, D.C. by rogue government agents led by Rico, who kills him in a staged traffic incident. Before dying, Cheng tells Max "Zeus". Max discovers that Project Zeus is designed to simulate extreme weather patterns and create a geostorm, and enlists his girlfriend, Secret Service agent Sarah Wilson, to obtain the kill code.

As the ICSS loses control of its systems and the virus activates the self-destruct programme, the crew deliberately knocks malfunctioning satellites offline by colliding them with replacements. During the DNC in Orlando, Florida, Max uses Project Zeus files to discover that Orlando is the next target, following a massive hailstorm in Tokyo and an offshore cold snap that devastates part of Rio de Janeiro. Max seeks help from Dekkom, who instead attempts to kill him, revealing himself as the saboteur.

Max informs Sarah, and they kidnap Palma to protect him from Dekkom's agents and obtain the kill code. They escape the stadium before a lightning storm destroys it, then reveal their activities and Dekkom's treachery to Palma. After evading Dekkom's mercenaries, they arrest him. Dekkom admits that he intends to eliminate the other elected officials in America's line of succession, enabling him to seize global power while eliminating America's enemies.

Duncan is revealed to be the traitor who killed Habib and created the storms on Dekkom's orders. Jake confronts him, and Duncan is killed when stray bullets shatter a window, while Jake escapes. As the crew evacuates the station, Jake and Ute remain behind to reboot the system, removing the virus and transferring satellite control to NASA, preventing the geostorm at the last moment.

Max and Sarah escort Palma to the Kennedy Space Center and transmit the code, but discover that the self-destruct sequence cannot be stopped. Further weather disasters strike worldwide. They escape aboard a replacement satellite as the sequence completes and use its thrusters as a beacon. A nearby shuttle, piloted by Hernández, rescues them. Six months later, Jake has returned as head engineer of Dutch Boy, now administered by an international committee that has rebuilt the space station.

== Cast ==
- Gerard Butler as Jake Lawson, a satellite designer, former ICSS commander, and Hannah's father
- Jim Sturgess as Assistant Secretary of State Max Lawson, Jake's younger brother and Hannah's uncle
- Abbie Cornish as US Secret Service Agent Sarah Wilson, Max's fiancée
- Alexandra Maria Lara as Ute Fassbinder, the commander of the space station and DLR/ESA astronaut
- Ed Harris as US Secretary of State Leonard Dekkom, the mastermind behind the Geostorm conspiracy
- Andy García as US President Andrew Palma
- Richard Schiff as Virginia Senator Thomas Cross
- Robert Sheehan as Duncan Taylor, a British crew member of the ICSS and UKSA/ESA astronaut and a traitor
- Eugenio Derbez as Al Hernández, a Mexican crew member of the ICSS and AEM astronaut
- Adepero Oduye as Eni Adisa, a Nigerian crew member of the ICSS and NASRDA astronaut
- Amr Waked as Ray Dussette, a French crew member of the ICSS and CNES/ESA astronaut
- Daniel Wu as Cheng Long, the Hong Kong-based supervisor for the Dutch Boy Program
- David S. Lee as Rico
- Zazie Beetz as Dana, a cybersecurity expert, and good friends with Max
- Talitha Bateman as Hannah Lawson, Jake's daughter and Max's niece. She is the beginning and end narrator of the film.
- Billy Slaughter as Karl Dright
- Tom Choi as Chinese Representative Lee
- Mare Winningham as Dr. Cassandra Jennings
- Jeremy Ray Taylor as Emmett
- Gregory Alan Williams as General Montgraff
- Drew Powell as Chris Campbell
- Brianna Denski as Girl (Uncredited)

Katheryn Winnick had been cast as Olivia Lawson, Jake's ex-wife and the mother of Hannah, but during reshoots, her role was recast with Julia Denton.

== Production ==
As Dean Devlin explained climate change to his daughter Hannah, she asked why a machine could not be built to fix that. Devlin went on to imagine such a thing, and how it could be used for evil purposes. As he struggled to develop his script, he asked the help of Paul Guyot, specially to write the brother dynamics. In 2013, Skydance Productions purchased the filming rights. After Skydance's distributing partner Paramount Pictures put the project into turnaround, Geostorm was pitched and accepted by Warner Bros. Pictures Pre-production began on July 7, 2014. With an initial budget of $82 million, principal photography began on October 20, 2014, in New Orleans, Louisiana, and lasted through February 10, 2015. Filming began on Loyola Avenue on the first day. Some NASA scenes were filmed at a NASA Rocket Factory in New Orleans in November 2014 and January 2015.

After poor test screenings in December 2015, $15 million reshoots were conducted in Louisiana in early December 2016, under new producer Jerry Bruckheimer, writer Laeta Kalogridis and director Danny Cannon. Winnick's role was recast with Julia Denton during reshoots, while new characters were added into the script.

=== Marketing ===
On October 16, 2017, Warner Bros. released a promotional video on its YouTube channel. In the video, a New York taxicab outfitted with hidden cameras drives onto a street apparently affected by an ice storm, much to the shock of its unwitting passengers.

== Release ==
The film was originally set for release on March 25, 2016, but in August 2014, Warner set that date for the release of Batman v Superman: Dawn of Justice instead. On December 11, 2014, WB shifted its live-action animated film Mowgli to 2017 and gave its previous date from March 25, 2016, then October 21, 2016, to Geostorm. In September 2015, the studio again moved back the film from October 21, 2016, to January 13, 2017. In June 2016, the studio announced the release had been moved back from January 13, 2017, to October 20, 2017. The film had an IMAX 3D release.

The theme song for the Japanese release is "Dinosaur" by B'z.

=== Home media ===
Geostorm was released on DVD, Blu-ray and Blu-ray 3D on January 16, 2018.

== Reception ==
=== Box office ===
Geostorm grossed $33.7 million in the United States and Canada, and $189.7 million in other territories, for a worldwide total of $223.4 million, against a production budget of $120 million. One box office analysis estimated that the film needed to gross $300–350 million worldwide in order to break even.

In North America, the film was released alongside Boo 2! A Madea Halloween, The Snowman and Only the Brave, and was expected to gross $10–12 million from 3,246 theaters in its opening weekend. After not holding Thursday night preview screenings, the film made $4.2 million on Friday. It went on to debut to $13.3 million, finishing second at the box office. The week after its release, it was reported the film would likely lose the studio around $100 million. In March 2018, Deadline Hollywood calculated the film lost Warner Bros. $71.6 million, when factoring together all expenses and revenues.

=== Critical response ===
On the review aggregator website Rotten Tomatoes, 18% of 96 critics' reviews are positive, with an average rating of 3.6/10. The website's consensus reads: "Lacking impressive visuals, well-written characters, or involving drama, Geostorm aims for epic disaster-movie spectacle but ends up simply being a disaster of a movie." Metacritic, which uses a weighted average, assigned the film a score of 21 out of 100, based on 22 critics, indicating "generally unfavorable" reviews. Audiences polled by CinemaScore gave the film an average grade of B− on an A+ to F scale, while PostTrak reported filmgoers gave it a 67% overall positive score and a 49% "definite recommend".

TheWrap gave the film a negative review and stated, "Disaster movies might have just flatlined with director and co-writer Dean Devlin's chaotically stupid bid to emulate his old partner, catastrophe peddler Roland Emmerich." Matt Singer of ScreenCrush gave the film 2 out of 10, calling the film a "slog, but the final act achieves a kind of transcendent idiocy." Peter Debruge of Variety gave the film a negative review and stated, "The only thing more reliable than bad weather is bad movies, and in that respect, Geostorm is right on forecast." A. O. Scott of The New York Times gave the film a negative review and stated, "Geostorm uses digital technology to lay waste to a bunch of cities and hacky screenwriting to assault the dignity of several fine actors." Peter Sobczynski of RogerEbert.com gave the film 1.5 out of 4 and stated that Geostorm "really could have used a Sharknado or two to liven things up."

The Arizona Republic gave the film 2 out of 5 and criticized its lack of "exciting action", "chintzy visuals", and "without enough Gerard to go around". Entertainment Weekly gave the film a 'D' score and sarcastically summarized the film as "a bunch of supposedly connected scenes that don't seem to even know each other and were maybe shot years apart." Mike D'Angelo of The A.V. Club gave the film a score of 'D+' and praised its "15 minutes worth of impressive annihilation", but criticized its "dramatic monotony". Anna Smith of Time Out gave the film 2 out of 5 and found it to be "appealing to scientists looking for a good laugh." Los Angeles Times praised its "clever premise", but cited its result as "mostly dull-witted". The Guardian gave the film 2 out of 5 and remarked that audiences "have been sold a false bill of goods." Donald Clarke of The Irish Times gave the film 2 out of 5 and stated, "Geostorm feels like the sequel to a slightly better, slightly more expensive, significantly more Tom Cruisey film that made all its money in foreign-language territories."

The Hollywood Reporter gave the film a negative review and stated, "Big, dumb and boring, [Geostorm] finds the co-writer of Independence Day hoping to start a directing career with the same playbook – but forgetting several rules of the game." Robbie Collin of The Daily Telegraph gave the film 1 out of 5 and stated, "Watching Gerard Butler solve a whodunit is like watching ... chimpanzees move a piano downstairs: a kind of teeth-baring, flea-picking burlesque of recognizable human behavior that's funny for a while until you start to worry about the ethics of it." Alissa Wilkinson of Vox gave the film 0.5 out of 5 and stated, "The level of boredom I experienced during Geostorm ought to qualify as at least a second-degree felony in the state of New York." Mark Kermode of Kermode & Mayo's Film Review gave the film a negative review and stated, "It is the kind of film in which having a British accent will get you punched in the face, but the fact that Gerard Butler talks like Sean Connery in that weird sequence from The Untouchables? Nobody cares." Empire gave the film 2 out of 5 and called it "not quite the geostinker people were expecting, but the outlook is far from unfavorable."

== See also ==
- List of films featuring space stations
- The Core – a 2003 film with a similar premise
- The Day After Tomorrow – a 2004 film with a similar premise from Devlin's longtime collaborator Roland Emmerich
- Greenland
