= Lou Lou Safran =

American actress

- Born: December 22, 2005; Los Angeles, California, U.S.
- Occupations: Actress; singer
- Years active: 2016–present
- Relatives: Peter Safran (father)
- Musical career
- Genre: Rock
- Instruments: Guitar; vocals
- Years active: 2013–present

Lou Lou Safran (born December 22, 2005) is an American actress and singer.

== Early life ==
Safran was born on December 22, 2005, in Los Angeles, California. Her father is British studio executive and film producer Peter Safran and her mother is Polish actress Natalia Safran.

== Career ==
=== Acting ===
Safran made her on screen debut in 2016 as Katie in The Choice. Safran was then cast as Tierney in Annabelle: Creation. She also appeared in Annabelle Comes Home but as a girl named Rebecca. Most recently, Safran has been cast as Heidi in the Scorpions biopic Wind of Change.

=== Music ===
Safran has named Bruce Springsteen, Willie Nelson, Alex Turner, and Dusty Springfield as her musical icons. She released her first single My Own Yellow Brick Road at just eight years old. Her debut album was called How To Hang Out With Friends Like Nothing Is Wrong. In 2024 Safran performed in Europe and at the Troubadour in Los Angeles. She has released 8 singles to date.

== Personal life ==
Safran has said that music is her favourite hobby. She likes listening to new songs, playing piano and learning to play the ukelele.

== Filmography ==
=== Film ===
Year	Title	Role	Notes
2016	The Choice	Katie	
2017	Annabelle: Creation	Tierney	
2019	Fear Filter	Leah	Short
2019	Shazam!	Sivanna's Twin Sisters	Scenes Deleted
2019	Annabelle Comes Home	Rebecca	
2023	Shazam! Fury of the Gods	Kitten Car Passenger	
2025	The Girl on a Motorcycle	Rebecca	Short
2025	Maculate	Mary	Short
2025	Cut	Girl	Short
2025	Tumbled	Girl	Short
TBA	Wind of Change	Heidi	

== Discography ==
=== Albums ===
- How To Hang Out With Friends Like Nothing Is Wrong (2024)
