= Vengeance: A Love Story =

- Theatrical release poster
- Directed by: Johnny Martin
- Screenplay by: John Mankiewicz
- Based on: Rape: A Love Story by Joyce Carol Oates
- Produced by: Nicolas Cage; Michael Mendelsohn
- Starring: Nicolas Cage; Don Johnson; Anna Hutchison; Talitha Bateman; Deborah Kara Unger
- Cinematography: David Stragmeister
- Music by: Frederik Wiedmann
- Production companies: Saturn Films; Patriot Pictures
- Distributed by: FilmRise
- Release dates: March 27, 2017 (United Kingdom); September 15, 2017 (United States)
- Running time: 99 minutes
- Country: United States
- Language: English
- Box office: $73,270

Vengeance: A Love Story is a 2017 American action thriller film directed by Johnny Martin, written by John Mankiewicz, and starring Nicolas Cage, Don Johnson, Anna Hutchison, Talitha Bateman and Deborah Kara Unger. It is based on the 2003 novel Rape: A Love Story by Joyce Carol Oates. The film was released on September 15, 2017, by FilmRise.

== Premise ==
Single mother Teena is brutally assaulted and raped by a local punks gang in front of her 12-year-old daughter Bethie. Despite Bethie being able to identify the attackers, the defense hires a local hot-shot defense attorney Jay Kirkpatrick (Don Johnson) who manipulates the law to their advantage and the attackers are acquitted in court through bribery with the accused's families. When the criminals are set free, Gulf War veteran and detective John Dromoor (Nicolas Cage) is dismayed by the lack of justice and plots revenge against the men on Teena's behalf.

== Cast ==
- Nicolas Cage as John Dromoor
- Anna Hutchison as Teena Maguire
- Talitha Bateman as Bethie Maguire
- Deborah Kara Unger as Agnes
- Don Johnson as Jay Kirkpatrick
- Joshua Mikel as Marvin Fick
- Charlene Tilton as Mrs. Irma Fick
- Dikran Tulaine as Mr. Walter Fick
- Mike Pniewski as Judge Schpiro
- Marc Coppola as Dr. Collins
- Francois Xavier Declie as Father Muldoon
- Michael Papajohn as JJ Breen
- Jwaundace Candece as Night Nurse
- Elizabeth Hunter as Annie
- Dwayne Boyd as Det. Lyle
- Emily Sandifer as Ursula
- Rey Hernandez as Trooper #1 (Craig)

== Production ==
Originally, production with Samuel L. Jackson, Dianne Wiest and Abigail Breslin associated, was set to be filmed in Michigan in 2009, under its film incentive program. Scouts arrived in fall 2008 and production was halted. On February 7, 2016, Nicolas Cage joined the cast of the film. On March 8, it was announced that Cage would direct the film, though he later dropped out of directing. Principal photography began on April 21. The following day, Anna Hutchison joined the cast. On May 12, Don Johnson joined the cast.

== Release ==
The film was released direct to video in the United Kingdom on March 27, 2017. In the United States, the film was released on September 15, 2017, by FilmRise. Michael Rechtshaffen of the Los Angeles Times was negative towards the film, criticizing the script as "melodramatic" and "ham-handed," the directing as "heavy-handed" and "cliché-ridden," and Cage's performance of John Dromoor as "detached."
