= Jumping the Scratch =

2006 novel by Sarah Weeks

Jumping the Scratch book cover

Jumping the Scratch is a novel by Sarah Weeks written for young adults. It was first published in 2006.

== Plot summary ==
Eleven-year-old Jamie Reardon’s cat dies and his father leaves home; and his aunt Sapphy has an accident at work that causes her memory to skip. Jamie is teased at school and, on the other hand, has a memory he'd give anything to be able to forget. He is performing badly at school and has Miss Miller, an unsympathetic teacher.

A visiting author, or as Jamie hears the name - 'Arthur', recognises that the boy is troubled, but the two do not have a chance to really communicate. Jamie has to sort out his problems himself. He tries to find the magic trigger that will help Sapphy's memory jump the scratch, like the needle on a record, but in the end it's Audrey Krouch, a neighborhood girl who hypnotises him. Under hypnosis, when he is hoping to learn how to forget, Jamie recalls being molested by Old Gray, a paedophile caretaker at the trailer park where he lives in Traverse City, Michigan. Jamie's emotional reaction to the incident he was trying to suppress returns Sapphy’s memory, and the boy is finally able to tell her everything. Jamie is the one who helped Aunt Sapphy jump the scratch, as well as his own.

The actual abuse is not described in the book. Sarah Weeks has said that, "I felt like I wanted to protect Jamie’s privacy... Jamie didn’t want anybody to know what had happened to him in Old Gray’s office on Christmas Eve, so it didn’t feel right for me to tell all the details either."
