= Countdown (2019 film) =

2019 film by Justin Dec

- Theatrical release poster
- Directed by: Justin Dec
- Written by: Justin Dec
- Produced by: John Rickard; Zack Schiller; Sean Anders; John Morris
- Starring: Elizabeth Lail; Jordan Calloway; Talitha Bateman; Tichina Arnold; P.J. Byrne; Peter Facinelli
- Cinematography: Maxime Alexandre
- Edited by: Brad Wilhite
- Music by: Danny Bensi; Saunder Jurriaans
- Production companies: STX Entertainment; Boies / Schiller Film Group; Two Grown Men; Wrigley Pictures
- Distributed by: STX Entertainment
- Release date: October 25, 2019 (United States)
- Running time: 90 minutes
- Country: United States
- Language: English
- Budget: $6.5 million
- Box office: $48 million

Countdown is a 2019 American supernatural horror film directed and written by Justin Dec, and starring Elizabeth Lail, Jordan Calloway, Talitha Bateman, Tichina Arnold, P.J. Byrne, Peter Facinelli, Anne Winters, and Tom Segura. The plot follows a group of people who discover a mobile app that correctly tells its users when they are going to die.

Countdown was theatrically released in the United States on October 25, 2019, by STX Entertainment. It received negative reviews from critics, but grossed $48 million worldwide against a $6.5 million budget, becoming a commercial success.

== Plot ==
At a party, teenager Courtney is convinced by her friends to download Countdown, an app that seemingly predicts how long a user has left to live. Courtney is startled to see it says she only has three hours left to live. After avoiding getting into a car with her drunk boyfriend Evan, Courtney receives a notification stating she has broken the "user agreement". Returning home, she is attacked by an unseen entity and killed as her timer reaches zero. At the same time, Evan crashes his car and a tree branch impales the seat where Courtney would have been sitting.

Quinn Harris, a nurse who works at the hospital where Evan is admitted, dismisses his claims of a supernatural app but subsequently downloads it, only for the app to claim that she has only two days left to live. Evan skips his surgery and is informed he has violated the user agreement. He tries escaping the hospital, but is confronted by an apparition of Courtney in a stairwell before being killed by the entity.

When Quinn finds out that Evan has died, she enters the morgue and checks his phone, which indicates no time left in the app. Concerned that she will die the next day, Quinn declines to go out with her family to visit her mother's grave. The app informs her that she has violated the user agreement. Shortly afterward, her boss Dr. Sullivan sexually harasses her and thwarts her attempt to report his offense to her supervisor. When Quinn researches the app, she finds that similar deaths have supposedly occurred involving other users, but the public generally considers them to be fake. She attempts to buy a new phone but finds that Countdown has downloaded itself onto it.

After being attacked by a demonic figure in the parking lot of the cell phone store, Quinn meets a young man named Matt, whose Countdown states he will die in 18 hours. They learn that the user agreement is broken if the user tries changing their fate: Quinn's trip with her family, and Matt taking a train ride, which they both canceled, should have resulted in their original deaths. At work, Quinn learns Sullivan has tricked the staff into thinking she sexually harassed him, resulting in her suspension. She and Matt consult a priest named Father John, who informs them that the app is linked to a demon named Ozhin, originally summoned by a Roma woman who told a prince when he would die. Cell phone salesman Derek hacks into the app code and identifies that Quinn's younger sister, Jordan, was meant to die shortly before Quinn, then adds several decades to Quinn, Jordan's, and Matt's lives. However, while Matt and Quinn spend the night together, the entity takes the form of Matt and attacks Quinn. To their shock, their countdowns, including Jordan's, reset to their original lifespans.

Jordan receives a notification of her countdown changing to the original lifespan and is then terrorized by a demonic form of her and Quinn's deceased mother. Quinn and Matt rescue her and return to Father John, who theorizes the curse can be broken if someone dies before their countdown ends or lives beyond their countdown. They prepare a warding circle in an attempt to delay Ozhin. The demon arrives and the circle initially wards off the demon, until it suddenly lures them outside, killing Matt and wounding Jordan in the process. While in grief over Matt's fate, Jordan starts having acute abdominal pain. Realizing her sister is seriously hurt, Quinn rushes Jordan to the hospital. Once there, she realizes she can kill Sullivan before his allotted time and break the curse. She attempts to attack him, but he is saved by Ozhin, who simultaneously prepares to kill Jordan. As Ozhin is terrorizing Jordan, Quinn overdoses on drugs before her timer ends and proves the app wrong. With instructions that Quinn gave her, Jordan revives her sister with Naloxone and their countdown timers stop. Sometime later, while visiting her and Jordan's mother's grave, Quinn receives word of Sullivan's arrest after more nurses have come forward, but discovers that an app called Countdown 2.0 has downloaded itself onto her phone, much to the sisters' horror.

In a mid credits scene, Derek is seen on a Tinder date. While his date goes to the restroom, his Countdown app causes the light to go out and Ozhin attacks him.

== Cast ==
- Elizabeth Lail as Quinn Harris, a newly appointed registered nurse and Jordan's older sister.
- Jordan Calloway as Matt Monroe, a young man whom Quinn meets at the phone store and team up to defeat Ozhin.
- Talitha Bateman as Jordan Harris, Quinn's younger sister who joins Quinn and Matt to fight against the demon, Ozhin.
- Tichina Arnold as Nurse Amy, the head of the hospital where Quinn works.
- PJ Byrne as Father John, a demon enthusiast who tries to help Quinn, Matt, and Jordan face Ozhin.
- Peter Facinelli as Dr. Sullivan, Quinn's boss.
- Dillon Lane as Evan, Courtney's boyfriend.
- Matt Letscher as Charlie Harris, the widowed father of Quinn and Jordan.
- Valente Rodriguez as Father David
- Tom Segura as Derek, a tech worker who can hack apps.
- Anne Winters as Courtney, Evan's girlfriend.
- Charlie McDermott as Scott
- Christina Pazsitzky as Krissy
- Jeannie Elise Mai as Allie
- Marisela Zumbado as Kate

== Production ==
Elizabeth Lail was cast in the film's leading role in March 2019. In April 2019, it was announced that Talitha Bateman, Peter Facinelli, Jordan Calloway, Tom Segura, P. J. Byrne, Anne Winters and Tichina Arnold had also joined the cast.

Danny Bensi and Saunder Jurriaans composed the film's score. The soundtrack was released by Sony Classical Records.

== Release ==
Countdown was theatrically released in the United States on October 25, 2019. The film's trailer premiered on September 13, 2019. STX Entertainment reportedly spent under $15 million promoting the film. The studio partnered with Amp Studios, run by YouTuber Brent Rivera, to promote the film on social media apps such as TikTok.

=== Home media ===
The film was released on January 7, 2020, by Universal Pictures Home Entertainment on DVD, Blu-ray and Digital HD.

== Reception ==
=== Box office ===
In the United States and Canada, Countdown was released alongside Black and Blue and The Current War, and was projected to gross around $5 million from 2,675 theaters in its opening weekend. The film made $3.1 million on its first day, including $515,000 from Thursday night previews. It went on to over-perform and debut at $9 million, finishing fifth. In its second weekend the film fell 35% to $5.8 million, finishing seventh.

=== Critical response ===
On the review aggregator website Rotten Tomatoes, 26% of 72 critics' reviews are positive, with an average rating of 4.20/10. The website's consensus reads: "Countdown may offer a few fleeting jolts for horror fans with barren queues, but it lacks enough wit or creativity to leave a lasting impression." On Metacritic, the film has a weighted average score of 31 out of 100, based on 16 critics, indicating "generally unfavorable" reviews. Audiences polled by CinemaScore gave the film an average grade of "C+" on an A+ to F scale, while those surveyed at PostTrak gave it 3 out of 5 stars.

Benjamin Lee of The Guardian gave the film 1 out of 5 stars, calling it "a Halloween release devoid of tricks, treats and anything even vaguely close to an original idea", and criticized it for its similarities to other horror films, especially Final Destination. Dennis Harvey of Variety called it a "bombastically dumb new chiller that probably would have been called 'Killer App' if that title hadn't already been used several times." The Verge's Charles Bramesco wrote, "The same horror devotees satisfied by the prepackaged premise and grace in execution of Happy Death Day will get everything from Countdown that's there to be gotten. But those in search of more incisive techno-horror that cuts to the core of everything frightening about phone ownership and usage will have to continue waiting." Zaki Hasan of the San Francisco Chronicle gave it 1 out of 5 stars, writing, "The one thing you can say about Countdown is that the title is entirely accurate. Almost from the moment it starts, you're checking your watch waiting for the closing credits to come up."

Kimber Myers of the Los Angeles Times was more positive, writing: "This isn't a subtle, moody film filled with a sense of unease; instead, jump scares are around every corner. If that's all you want from a horror movie, you'll have a very good time - and an elevated heart rate for its speedy 90 minutes." The Deseret News' Josh Terry wrote, "If you're looking for a few good scares that push the PG-13 boundary without breaking it, Countdown has fun with its clever premise."

== See also ==
- Bedeviled
- Final Destination
- The Ring
