= Jessie Collins =

American actress

- Born: Jessica Collins; San Antonio, Texas, U.S.
- Education: Juilliard School (BFA)

Jessica Ann Collins is an American actress.

== Early life ==
Collins was born in San Antonio, Bexar County, Texas. She is one of four sisters, all of whom are involved in the arts. For much of her childhood, she and her family resided in rural Los Angeles, Texas. Collins attended Tom C. Clark High School in San Antonio, graduating in 2001. She attended Juilliard graduating in 2005.

== Career ==
Collins has portrayed the roles of Natalie Davis, the psychopath serial killer The Miniature Killer, on CSI: Crime Scene Investigation and social worker Lizzie Miller on the ABC's The Nine. She portrayed Maggie Young on the AMC original series Rubicon.

== Filmography ==
Year	Title	Role	Notes
2005	Ghost Whisperer	Zoe Harper/Natalie Harper	Episode: "Ghost, Interrupted"
2006	Law & Order: Criminal Intent	Nikki Newsom	Episode: "Wrongful Life"
2006–07	The Nine	Lizzie Miller	Series regular (13 episodes)
2007	Spider-Man 3	Andrea Rubin	
2007	The Man	Constance Brielle	TV movie
2007–08	CSI: Crime Scene Investigation	Natalie Davis "The Miniature Killer"	Recurring role (3 episodes)
2008	The Loss of Teardrop Diamond	Vinnie	
2009	The Good Wife	Danielle Raines	Episode: "Home"
2010	Rubicon	Maggie Young	Series regular (13 episodes)
2010	Lulu at the Ace Hotel	Lady Lover	Short film
2010	Blue Bloods	Becky Walenski	Episode: "Re-Do"
2011	Law & Order: LA	Liz Bennett	Episode: "Angel's Knoll"
2012	House	Dr. Elizabeth Lawson	Episode: "The C Word"
2012	Zero Dark Thirty	Debbie	
2012	Person of Interest	Abby Monroe	Episode: "Shadow Box"
2013	Home Burial	unknown role	Short film
2013–14	Revolution	Cynthia	Series regular (10 episodes)
2016	So B. It	Mama	
2016	The Interestings	Cathy Kiplingers	TV movie
2016	Free State of Jones	Annie	
2018	For the People	Stoller's Mistress	Episode: "World's Greatest Judge"
2020	Clickbait	Emma Beesley	Episode: "#1.1"
2022	Echo 3	Amber Chesborough	Series regular (10 episodes)

== Theatre ==
- Manic Flight Reaction (2005) as Grace
- King Lear (Shakespeare in the Park 2014) as Cordelia
