= Talitha Bateman =

American actress

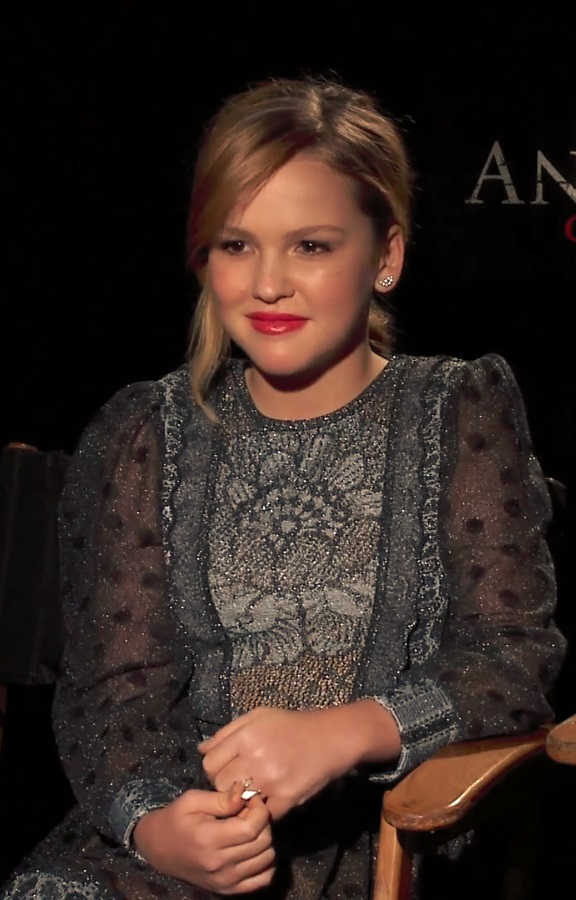
- Bateman promoting Annabelle: Creation in 2017
- Born: Turlock, California, U.S.
- Occupation: Actress
- Years active: 2012–present
- Relatives: Gabriel Bateman (brother)

Talitha Bateman is an American actress. After making her acting debut in a 2013 episode of the sitcom The Middle, she has starred in the independent drama film So B. It (2016), the science fiction film The 5th Wave (2016), the supernatural horror film Annabelle: Creation (2017), the disaster film Geostorm (2017), the thriller film Vengeance: A Love Story (2017), the romantic comedy film Love, Simon (2018), and the horror film Countdown (2019).

== Personal life ==
Bateman was born in Turlock, California. She followed her older sister to Los Angeles to start auditioning for roles. She was homeschooled and still lives in southern California. Talitha is the seventh of eight children; her younger brother, Gabriel Bateman, is also an actor.

== Career ==
Bateman's first screen appearance was on television, in a small role during a 2013 episode of the ABC sitcom The Middle. She appeared in the pilot episodes of Maker Shack Agency and Mamma Dallas, neither of which went to series. In 2015, Bateman appeared in three episodes of The CW's comedy-drama series Hart of Dixie, playing the recurring role of Scarlett Kincaid during the fourth season.

On film, Bateman played Kayla in the science fiction horror film The Hive, which premiered at Fantastic Fest in September 2014. She played Teacup in the science fiction film The 5th Wave and Nicole in the comedy film Nine Lives, both of which were released in 2016.

Bateman played the lead character of Heidi DeMuth in the independent drama film So B. It, which was produced in 2015 and was picked up for release in 2017. Also that year, she played the title role of Janice / Annabelle Higgins in the supernatural horror prequel film Annabelle: Creation and Hannah Lawson in the science fiction disaster film Geostorm.

In 2018, she starred as Nora Spier in the romantic comedy film Love, Simon, alongside Jennifer Garner, with whom she also co-starred in Nine Lives. In 2019, she appeared in the supernatural horror film Countdown alongside Elizabeth Lail and Jordan Calloway.

== Filmography ==
=== Film ===
Year	Title	Role	Notes
2012	George Biddle, CPA	Kid of Many	
2013	The Park Bench	Young Molly's Friend	Short film
2014	Life Grows On	Granddaughter	Short film
2014	The Hive	Kayla	
2014	We Make That Lemonade	Beef	Short film
2016	The 5th Wave	Teacup	
2016	Nine Lives	Nicole Camden	
2016	So B. It	Heidi DeMuth	
2017	Vengeance: A Love Story	Bethie Maguire	
2017	Annabelle: Creation	Janice / Annabelle Higgins	
2017	Geostorm	Hannah Lawson	
2018	Love, Simon	Nora Spier	
2018	The Boxcar Children: Surprise Island	Violet (voice)	
2018	Just Between Us	Bree	
2019	Countdown	Jordan Harris	
2019	Robert the Bruce	Iver	

=== Television ===
Year	Title	Role	Notes
2013	The Middle	Girl Glossner	Episode: "The Kiss"
2014	Maker Shack Agency	Cheerleader	Episode: "Pilot"
2014	Petals on the Wind	Emma	Television film
2015	Hart of Dixie	Scarlett Kincaid	3 episodes
2016	Mamma Dallas	Unknown	Episode: "Pilot"
2016	Furst Born	Erin	Episode: "Pilot"
2017	Stuck in the Middle	Sophie	Episode: "Stuck with a New Friend"
2019	Law & Order: Special Victims Unit	Laura Moore	Episode: “A Story of More Woe”
2020	Away	Alexis Logan	Netflix Original

== Accolades ==
Year	Award	Category	Work	Result
2018	MTV Movie & TV Awards	Most Frightened Performance	Annabelle: Creation	Nominated
