= Sarah Weeks =

American writer of children's books (born 1955)

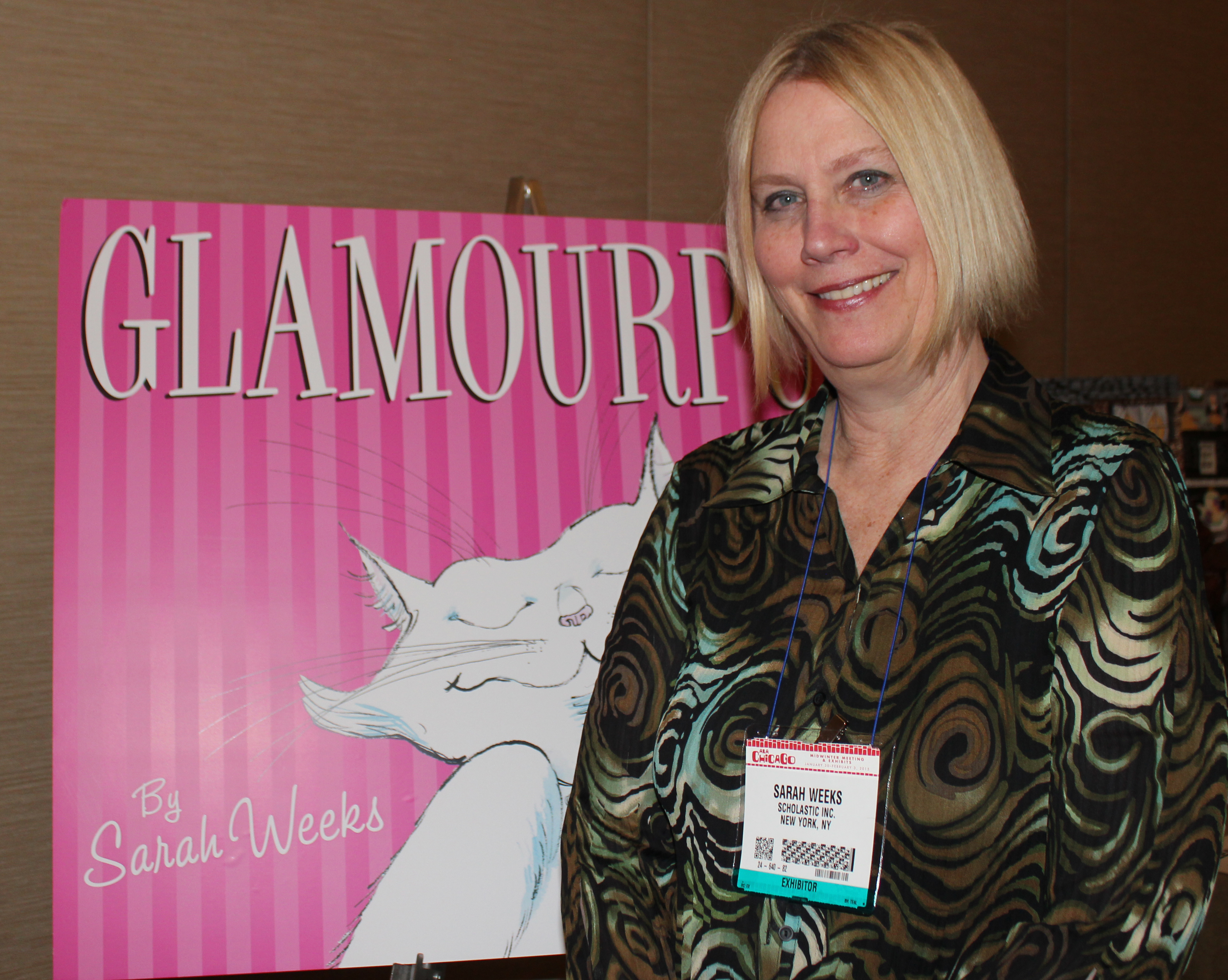
- Weeks in 2015.
- Born: March 18, 1955 (age 71); Ann Arbor, Michigan, US
- Occupation: Writer
- Spouse: Jim Fyfe
- Children: 2
- Writing career
- Genres: Picture books, chapter books, novels
- Notable works: So B. It, Jumping the Scratch
- Website: sarahweeks.com

Sarah Weeks (born March 18, 1955) is an American writer of children's books, perhaps best known for the novel So B. It which has won several juvenile literature awards. In 2007 it won the Rebecca Caudill Young Reader's Book Award and William Allen White Children's Book Award.

== Biography ==
Sarah Weeks was born in Ann Arbor, Michigan, in 1955, the daughter of an English professor. She has a brother and a sister. When she was a little girl, the things she liked to do best were playing music and writing. When she grew up, she went to New York City, married, and had two sons, Gabriel and Nathaniel.

== Selected works ==
=== Chapter books ===
Oggie Cooder series

- Oggie Cooder
- Oggie Cooder, Party Animal

Misadventures of Guy Strang series

- Regular Guy (Laura Geringer/HarperCollins, 1999)
- Guy Time
- My Guy
- Guy Wire

Boyds Will Be Boyds series

- Beware of Mad Dog
- Get Well Soon or Else!
- Danger! Boys Dancing!
- Fink's Funk!

Other

- Tripping Over the Lunch Lady and Other School Stories
- The Little Factory

=== Picture books ===
- Hurricane City (HarperCollins, 1993), illustrated by James Warhola

=== Novels ===
- As Simple as it Seems
- So B. It
- Jumping the Scratch
- Up All Night
- PIE
- Honey
- Save Me a Seat
- Soof
