= Back room =

Back room (also back rooms, backroom, or backrooms) may refer to:

== Fiction ==
- The Backrooms, a piece of internet fiction originating from 4chan
  - Backrooms (web series), a YouTube series made by Kane Parsons based on the fiction
    - "The Backrooms (Found Footage)", the 2022 premiere episode of the web series
    - Backrooms (film), 2026, directed by Kane Parsons based on the web series
  - "Backrooms" (American Horror Stories), a 2024 episode of the TV series American Horror Stories
  - Escape the Backrooms, a 2025 video game by Fancy Games and Blackbird Interactive based on the fiction

== Music ==
- "Backr00ms", a 2025 song by Playboi Carti
- The Back Room (album), 2005, by the British rock band Editors
- Emo's, formerly known as The Back Room, a music and event venue in Austin, Texas

== Nightclub subculture ==
- Dark room (sexuality), also known as a back room, play room, or black room, which is a room at a nightclub, sex club, bathhouse, or adult bookstore
