= Backrooms (soundtrack) =

Backrooms (Original Soundtrack)

Film score by Edo Van Breemen and Kane Parsons
- Released: May 29, 2026
- Recorded: 2026
- Genre: Film score
- Length: 92:30
- Label: A24 Music
- Producers: Kane Parsons, Edo Van Breemen

Kane Parsons chronology
| I Can't Wait to Use the Internet (2025) | Backrooms (2026) |

Edo Van Breemen chronology
| Keeper (2025) | Backrooms (2026) | Night Comes (TBA) |

Backrooms (Original Soundtrack) is the film score to the 2026 science fiction psychological horror film Backrooms directed by Kane Parsons in his feature-length directorial debut. Parsons also co-scored the film with Edo Van Breemen, which was released through A24 Music on May 29, 2026.

== Background ==
Backrooms was the feature-length directorial debut of Kane Parsons, which was an adaptation of his own web series in turn based on the "Backrooms" creepypasta. Besides directing, Parsons handled the visual effects and also co-scored the film with Canadian musician Edo Van Breemen. Parsons' liking to music composition was him: "mostly function[ing] more as a caveman [than a musician], banging rocks together" as he never had a formal training in music or playing instrument, and his father being a hobbyist DJ playing dubstep music in the car when he was a childhood, and his liking to ambient music informed his musical career and had released his musical performances in his other YouTube channel.

For the musical soundscape, Parsons tended to reach for music which lingered in a meditative place which was not structured like a traditional song, and ranged from film and video game soundtracks. As he had also composed the series, the score for the film had to be identical, and the sound design being a more windy and richer than the series, which was a found footage, hence having a mono audio. Some of the cues had been inspired by the production design and the "room tones" themselves, which led to the score being ambiguous and having an unsettling atmosphere. The inspiration from Backrooms' music was derived from artists like Aphex Twin, Boards of Canada and Burial. Particularly, Boards of Canada's "The Word Becomes Flesh" from their studio album Inferno was featured in the film's end credits.

== Release ==
Backrooms (Original Soundtrack) was released through A24 Music on May 29, 2026. The album was also released in LP formats in September 2026.

== Reception ==
Harry Thorfinn-George of Pitchfork rated 7 out of 10 and said that the score "plays like a standalone album of dark ambient for a time when AI simulacrum and abandoned public spaces are part of the everyday and the liminal and uncanny are the pop-psychology du jour". Elijah Pareño of Rolling Stone Philippines said that: "The Backrooms score is a masterclass in suspense and an audio love letter to internet horror".

The score was also the subject of commentary by reviewers of the film. Brian Tallerico of RogerEbert.com wrote that it was essential to the film's success, calling it "an insidious score, one that almost sounds as if it emerged from the Backrooms itself". Nikki Baughan of Screen Daily called the score "fantastic" and "bombastic" and credited it with improving the film's atmosphere with "propulsive, often deafening beats with skittering tones and barely-audible throbs". Randy Myers of The Mercury News wrote that the score serves to "accentuate and stimulate the strangeness" of the film, and Sam Haysom of Mashable found it "oppressive".

== Track listing ==
All tracks are written by Kane Parsons and Edo Van Breemen, except where noted.

"Cafe Bossa v1" is written by Riverworn and performed by Jeffrey Innes.

| No. | Title | Writer(s) | Length |
|---|---|---|---|
| 1. | "Handprint" | Parsons | 5:11 |
| 2. | "People in San Jose" | | 4:00 |
| 3. | "Local Network" | Parsons | 4:19 |
| 4. | "Pirate Shanty" | Aiden Ayers, Van Breemen | 1:55 |
| 5. | "Furniture Lament" | | 4:18 |
| 6. | "The Untrained Mind" | Van Breemen | 3:33 |
| 7. | "Quiet Wall in Dark Room" | Van Breemen | 3:29 |
| 8. | "Basement Land" | Jeffrey Innes, Parsons, Van Breemen | 5:37 |
| 9. | "Ottoman Empire" | Innes, Parsons, Van Breemen | 2:41 |
| 10. | "Next Room Over" | Parsons | 1:49 |
| 11. | "Feeling of a Door Imminently Remembered" | Parsons | 1:33 |
| 12. | "Capitol & McKee" | Innes, Van Breemen | 0:45 |
| 13. | "Cafe Bossa v1" | Riverworn | 2:00 |
| 14. | "Open the Window" | Innes, Van Breemen | 2:38 |
| 15. | "4-PCH" | Van Breemen | 4:11 |
| 16. | "Paint" | Parsons | 1:17 |
| 17. | "You Know Me" | Innes, Parsons, Van Breemen | 2:05 |
| 18. | "Dining Room" | Innes, Parsons, Van Breemen | 8:40 |
| 19. | "Landsick" | | 2:38 |
| 20. | "Homothet" | | 1:39 |
| 21. | "Layout Extrapolation" | | 3:19 |
| 22. | "Furnished Dead End" | Van Breemen | 2:09 |
| 23. | "Wired" | Van Breemen | 1:31 |
| 24. | "Cold Floor" | Parsons | 2:25 |
| 25. | "Humble MRI Company" | Parsons | 6:58 |
| 26. | "Old Home Not Yet Built" | Samuel Davidson, Parsons | 5:44 |
| 27. | "Complex" | Davidson, Innes, Parsons, Van Breemen | 6:06 |
| Total length: | | | 92:30 |

== Personnel ==
Musicians

- Aiden Ayers – first violin
- Sam Davidson – clarinet, electric wind instrument

Technical

- Kane Parsons – producer, composer
- Edo Van Breemen – producer, composer, mixer
- Timothy Carlson – designer
- Natasha Duprey – music supervisor
- Alex Gordon – mastering
- Jeffrey Innes – score mixer, additional composition (for "Cafe Bossa v1")
- Shayla Swanson – music editor
