= The Poolrooms =

Fictional location and Internet aesthetic

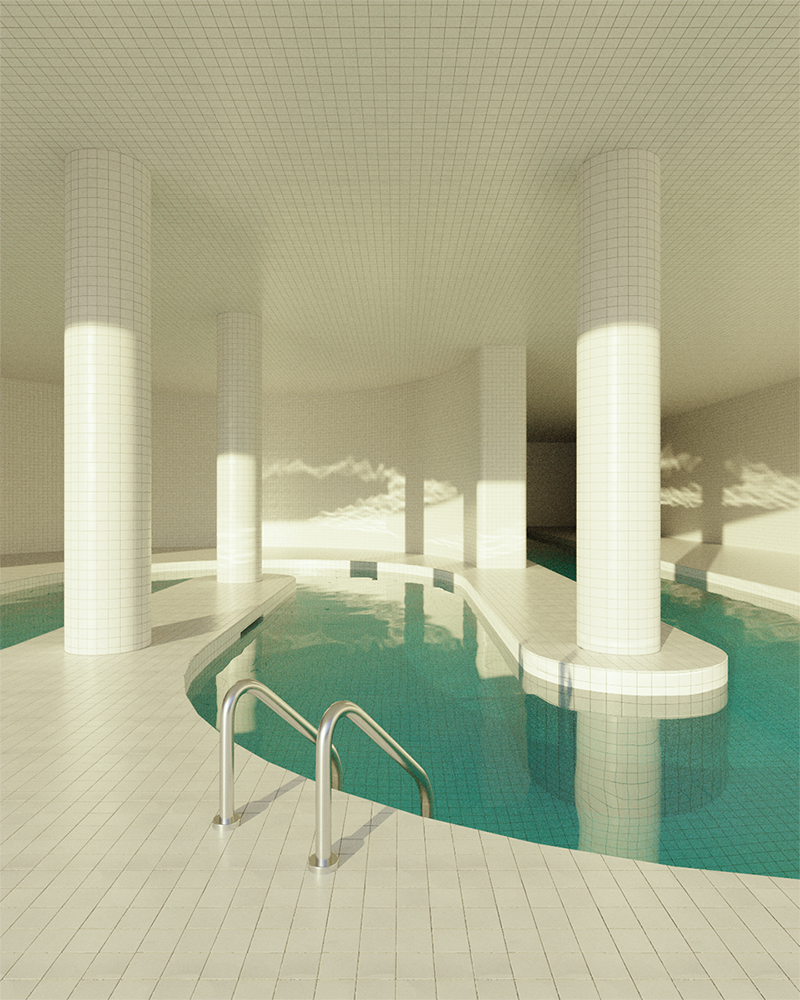
3D render of "the Poolrooms" by Jared Pike

The Poolrooms are a fictional liminal space and Internet aesthetic consisting of a seemingly infinite labyrinth of pristine, white-tiled indoor swimming pools. Originating from the "Dream Pools" series of 3D renderings by the American artist Jared Pike in the year 2020, the concept gained widespread popularity online and has since expanded beyond Pike's original work through fan creations, online communities, and adaptations in video games and film.

While often interpreted as unsettling or disorienting and associated with liminal horror, some viewers find depictions of the Poolrooms to be calming and serene, as well as evoking a sense of nostalgia. The Poolrooms have also been adapted by some Internet users as an extension or part of the Backrooms—a fictional location usually portrayed as an impossibly large or endless extradimensional complex of empty rooms, accessed by exiting reality.

A video game adaptation, Pools, was released on 26 April 2024, while a feature film adaptation, The Pools, is scheduled for a theatrical release on 25 December 2026.

== History ==
=== Origins with Jared Pike's work ===
In 2020, Jared Pike, a New York-based visual artist and graphic designer and 2016 graduate from Northeastern University (NU) in Boston, Massachusetts, commenced a series of 3D renderings of seemingly endless hallways and rooms of indoor swimming pools with white-tiled floors and walls called "Dream Pools". Drawing inspiration from the liminal space and vaporwave visual styles, he reimagines the swimming pools as "surreal, discomfiting places" by including dark areas not seen in real indoor swimming pools, tiles which appear too uniform and pristine, clear blue-green waters, and bizarre room proportions.

Using the software program Blender, Pike initially started the series during the COVID-19 pandemic to improve his 3D modelling skills. Upon releasing the series on Instagram, however, the images went viral; Internet users were intrigued by the concept and began creating their own explanations and fan theories ("lore") regarding these rooms, including connecting them to the "Backrooms" (from where the name "Poolrooms" is derived).

=== Spread and adaptations ===
The success of Pike's Dream Pools lead to the concept expanding beyond his original work. Fans of the initial concept began creating their own Poolrooms, with YouTubers uploading video compilations of eerie indoor swimming pools, ranging from digital renders to real life photographs. Pike himself, a fan of the web series Backrooms by Kane Parsons, uploaded his own short film inspired by Parsons' series (using his own 3D scenes from "Dream Pools") called "The Pool Rooms (Found Footage)".

A 2022 episode of the psychological horror web series Backrooms, as well as its 2026 film continuation, both directed by Kane Parsons, briefly feature an adaptation of the Poolrooms.

In 2024, the horror walking simulator video game Pools was released by Finnish developer Tensori in which the protagonist explores a vast, labyrinthine pool complex. Inspired by Pike's Dream Pools among other works—including those by Backrooms artists—the game is presented as a VHS found footage piece and has no story, with the player exploring the environment on foot, through swimming, walking up staircases and using water slides. There are no enemies nor antagonists that can attack the player, and there is no music; the only sounds present in the game are those of the echoes of the environment and footsteps made by the player. The Poolrooms are also featured in the cooperative horror video game Escape the Backrooms, where they appear as a separate level; Level 37.

A short VR art film Liminal Dreams was screened at Venice Biennale 2024. The film was part of the extended reality exhibition "Venice Immersive", which was held on Lazzaretto Vecchio from 28 August to 7 September. The director, "Lotus", described the film as a "love letter to The Poolrooms".

A feature film inspired by the Poolrooms, titled The Pools, is scheduled for a theatrical release on 25 December 2026. However, the project is not affiliated with creator Jared Pike.

== Style ==
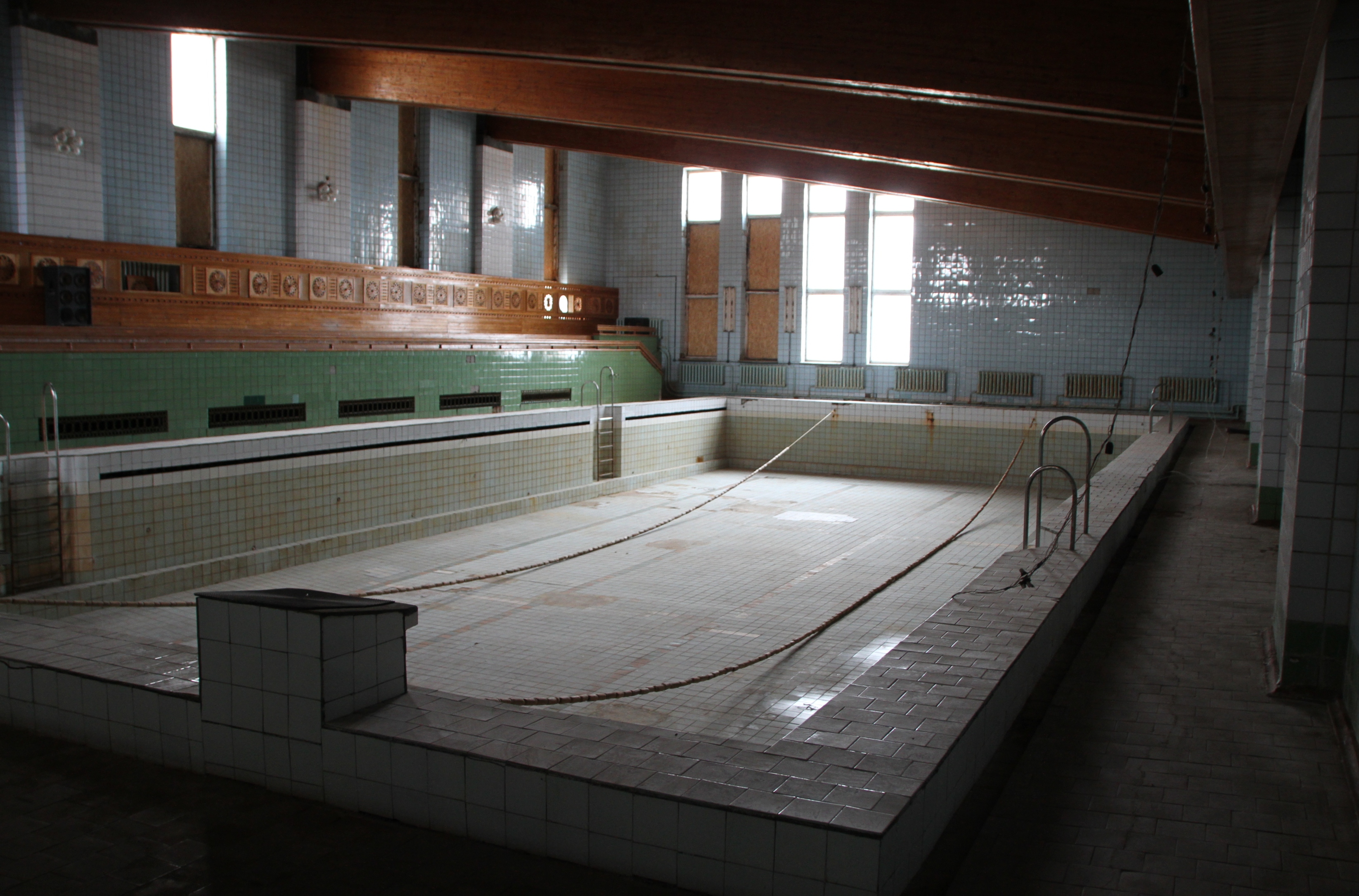
A photo of an abandoned pool in Svalbard which evokes the liminal space aesthetic

The Poolrooms are cited as an example of a liminal space. Marcel Mensah of LONER Magazine compared the Poolrooms to the "dreamcore" and "weirdcore" styles. The familiar yet uncanny appearance and nature of the Poolrooms is regarded by some as inherently eerie or frightening, making them an example of liminal horror. In contrast, others find the Poolrooms to be comforting or relaxing (serene), and have said that it evokes a sense of nostalgia.

Most depictions of the Poolrooms do not include any entities (living creatures). Pike has stated his disagreement for the extended depictions of his original Pool Dreams images that remove the element of mystery, saying that: "If you saw what's lurking behind certain corners or in the shadows, then you wouldn't find them to be very scary".

Users have also shared photographs of strange or serene swimming pools similar to the aesthetic on the subreddit (online discussion forum) r/poolrooms; some posts are directly connected to the Backrooms whereas others pertain simply to the general concept.

== See also ==
- Analog horror – Subgenre of horror fiction
- Backrooms – 2026 film by Kane Parsons
- Internet aesthetics – Visual styles and subcultures associated with the internet
- Internet culture – Culture that has emerged from the use of computer networks
- List of creepypastas – List of Internet horror legends
- The Backrooms – Fictional location
- Urban exploration – Exploration of hidden or abandoned buildings and structures
