= Ssundee =

American YouTuber

SSundee
- SSundee at Minecon 2016
- Born: Ian Marcus Stapleton; Michigan, U.S.
- Occupation: YouTuber

YouTube information
- Channel: SSundee
- Years active: 2009–present
- Genres: Let's Play; gaming; comedy
- Subscribers: 25.5 million
- Views: 17.4 billion
- Military career
- Allegiance: United States
- Branch: United States Air Force
- Last updated: November 10, 2026

Ian Marcus Stapleton, known online as SSundee, is an American YouTuber who makes comedic gaming videos. His channel, created in 2009, features modded and challenge-based playthroughs of Minecraft, Fortnite, Among Us, and Roblox, usually recorded with a recurring group of other creators. As of November 2026, the channel has more than 25 million subscribers and 17 billion views.

== Early life ==
Stapleton grew up in Michigan and later lived in Louisiana, Virginia, and South Carolina. He served in the United States Air Force, including a deployment to Iraq, and left the military in 2013 to make YouTube videos full-time.

== Career ==
Stapleton's channel joined YouTube on November 27, 2009, and he began uploading videos the following year. According to Beano, the name "SSundee" comes from a joke about the way older people pronounce the word "Sunday". The channel became known for Minecraft videos, and Stapleton frequently collaborated with the Danish YouTuber Crainer. He also performs as "Derp SSundee", a sillier alter ego whose avatar has eyes pointing in different directions.

By the mid-2010s the channel was among the most-watched gaming channels on YouTube. It appeared on Tubefilter's monthly chart of the 100 most-viewed gaming channels worldwide, recording about 88.7 million views in September 2016 and about 71.5 million in March 2017, when it had 7.9 million subscribers and 2.7 billion lifetime views.

Stapleton later made Fortnite the focus of the channel. In January 2019, Tubefilter described him as a "Fortnite pro" with 10.5 million subscribers and between 75 and 100 million views per month. At the time he was represented by Night Media, the Dallas-based talent management firm whose clients also included MrBeast and Preston.

The channel subsequently broadened to Among Us and Roblox. Many of its videos are built around custom mods that change the rules of a game, and it has also featured horror titles such as Poppy Playtime and Escape the Backrooms, along with occasional reaction videos. In 2025 the channel was uploading nearly every day.

Outside YouTube, Stapleton co-runs Ninety9Lives, an Arizona-based record label that releases royalty-free music.

== Reception ==
Reviewing the channel for Plugged In in 2025, Kennedy Unthank wrote that it was cleaner than many other gaming channels the publication had reviewed, noting that Stapleton censors crude language in his reaction videos. Unthank cautioned parents about the animated violence in the horror games featured, occasional mild profanity, and videos in which Stapleton spends Robux on in-game advantages.

== Personal life ==
Stapleton is married and has three sons. He is a Christian.
