= The Oldest View =

YouTube mystery thriller series (2023–2024)

- Video thumbnail for "The Rolling Giant", the third episode of The Oldest View
- Genre: Found footage; Mystery fiction
- Created by: Kane Parsons (Note: Known online as "Kane Pixels".)
- Inspired by: Valley View Center
- Developed by: Kane Parsons; Aiden Granado (Note: Known online as "Corrupt".)
- Written by: Kane Parsons
- Directed by: Kane Parsons
- Composer: Kane Parsons
- Country of origin: United States
- Original language: English
- No. of episodes: 6

Production
- Animator: Kane Parsons

Original release
- Network: YouTube
- Release: March 18, 2023 – September 11, 2024

The Oldest View is a mystery thriller web series created by American YouTuber and filmmaker Kane Parsons. Production of the series began in January 2023, shortly after Parsons's Backrooms web series entered a temporary hiatus. The series debuted in March 2023 with the episode "Renewal", which has over 6 million views as of September 2026—while the third episode, "The Rolling Giant" the longest video, released in October 2023, has over 14 million views. In September 2024, the most recent installment, "The Remains of Valley View Mall (Post-Demolition)", was released, as Parsons went on to continue production on his Backrooms series.

The Oldest View is centered around the real life Valley View Center mall in Dallas, Texas, which was completely demolished in May 2023. The series depicts a version of the mall that has somehow manifested underground, discovered from a hole in the ground with concrete stairs leading down to the mall. The protagonist of the series is a 20-year-old named Wyatt (played by Parsons) who ventures through the mall, recording on his phone to uncover its mysteries, with a giant rolling puppet within that pursues him.

== Premise ==
Set in May 2023, the series follows Wyatt, a young YouTube vlogger who documents his exploration in the Valley View Center, which is mysteriously found a mile underground via a tunnel containing concrete stairs. As he begins to explore the inside of the mall, a giant rolling puppet begins to pursue him.

== Episodes ==
No.	Title	Directed by	Written by	Length	Original release date
1	"Renewal"	Kane Parsons	Kane Parsons	4:05	March 18, 2023
During the spring of 1857, Julien Reverchon begins to study the local plant life near the formal site of La Réunion, Texas. As he comes across and sits on a fallen log by a water stream and takes out a book from his pocket to read, the film then starts to look towards the sky through the trees and the screen slowly gets darker. The video cuts to February 2012, where local Dallas artist Kevin Obregón begins to craft the Julien Reverchon giant by measuring and cutting cardboard for an elongated head. One scene shows a view from inside the craft showing flowers being carried by who is believed to also be Obregón. A view is shown of the completed craft, being the same as shown on the drawing as the video ends.
2	"Beneath the Earth"	Kane Parsons	Kane Parsons	12:08	May 14, 2023
Wyatt (Kane Parsons), a young YouTube vlogger, records a video in a mysterious park, which he keeps unnamed as it is private property. He finds a tunnel under an oak tree with stairs lit up, leading deep underground. At the bottom he finds an old, handle-less wooden door, a rusty locked fence gate, and hears mall-like music. Crawling under the gate, he discovers an empty mall behind roller fence gates. He then questions if he should upload this exploration to YouTube, and the video ends.
3	"The Rolling Giant"	Kane Parsons	Kane Parsons	46:18	October 8, 2023
After an initial trail camera expedition, Wyatt returns to the abandoned underground mall, determined to investigate. A door slams, but he pushes deeper, discovering art studios and a large puppet based on Julien Reverchon before the mall's lights and music suddenly activate. Trapped by a collapsed staircase, he finds an exit sign that confirms the mall is underground. Returning to the main area, Wyatt is unsettled by flickering lights and a statue that moves and then disappears. A gate leads him to Midtown Artist Studios, where he finds a dark forest. He flees, hearing noises, with the giant puppet pursuing him. Realizing it is autonomous and aggressive, he retreats as it relentlessly chases him through maintenance corridors, smashing windows. In an office, Wyatt finds a map with an emergency exit on the AMC Level. However, as he exits the back hallways of the mall, he discovers that the mall has become overrun with plant life. As he heads toward the exit, the giant blocks every path. Finally, at the emergency roof exit, he finds dead bodies and horses, and the giant appears again. Wyatt dodges its attack and escapes to the roof, but a metal beam breaks, sending him to his death. The video ends with a shot of his body and the giant's face in the forest.
4	"Life of a Giant"	Kane Parsons	Kane Parsons	3:36	December 2, 2023
The video begins with March 2012 archival footage of artist Kevin Obregón constructing the Julien Reverchon giant in Dallas, Texas. The puppet is paraded through busy public streets before finding a permanent home inside the bustling Valley View Center mall, where visitors pose for photographs with it. As a November 2017 newspaper headline signals the mall's decline, subsequent shots show the giant left completely abandoned in dark, empty corridors. The active mall scenery then shifts to a decaying version of the central atrium, featuring a glowing stone monument covered in symbols. The puppet is shown emerging from the dark and resting in a foggy, overgrown field. Soon after, drone footage shows heavy machinery tearing down the structure, which was engulfed in several fires during this time. The video documents officials inspecting the flooded, ruined interior of the building before concluding with a historical portrait of botanist Julien Reverchon and grainy, old film footage of an ancient earthwork mound–which looks remarkably similar to the mall's center atrium.
5	"Dispersal"	Kane Parsons	Kane Parsons	9:34	April 11, 2024
After the muffled screams of Wyatt are heard, (Note: As depicted in "The Rolling Giant".) the wooden door at the entrance to the underground mall retreats into shadows. The scene shifts to a dark forest with a staircase leading to a glowing light. Suddenly, Wyatt’s lifeless body is shown on the grass, and an image of the giant’s back flags appears in the cloudy sky. The video then returns to the moment when Wyatt previously fell from the roof while trying to get away from the giant, but this time an alternate timeline is presented in which Wyatt escapes the mall, running through a field and forest, appearing injured and in pain. Eerie music plays as text states: "Anatomically modern humans have existed for approximately 300,000 years" and "recorded history accounts for roughly 1.6% of this time". Wyatt is then shown safely in his car, taking a deep breath and turning on music. He notices his maps are offline, but a passing car confirms his return to reality. The video concludes by following the giant rolling along surface roads, obeying traffic laws, and appearing to look around as the sound of its wheels fades and the video abruptly ends.
6	"The Remains of Valley View Mall (Post-Demolition)"	Kane Parsons	Kane Parsons	19:33	September 11, 2024
The video opens with slow, sweeping aerial drone footage looking down at the expansive, flattened demolition site of the Valley View Center mall. The cameraman walks over massive mounds of crushed concrete, twisted steel rebar, and scattered debris covering the property. As the video progresses, the perspective shifts to ground-level shots, panning across the vast wasteland of rubble under an overcast sky. The footage captures a few remaining structural fragments, isolated concrete pillars, and distant construction vehicles sitting idle amidst the destruction. Throughout the clip, the camera frequently frames active highways and nearby city buildings in the background, showing the contrast between the bustling outer world and the empty, ruined lot. The footage occasionally splices in pictures of the mall, captured by visitors before its demolition on May 2023. The entire video maintains a steady, observational pace with no dialogue or action, accompanied only by a low, atmospheric ambient audio track and the sound of the wind. It concludes with final, distant panoramic views of the desolate site as the cameraman sits down near one of the structural fragments (presumably reminiscing the fondness of visiting the mall) before the video slowly fades to black.

== Development and themes ==
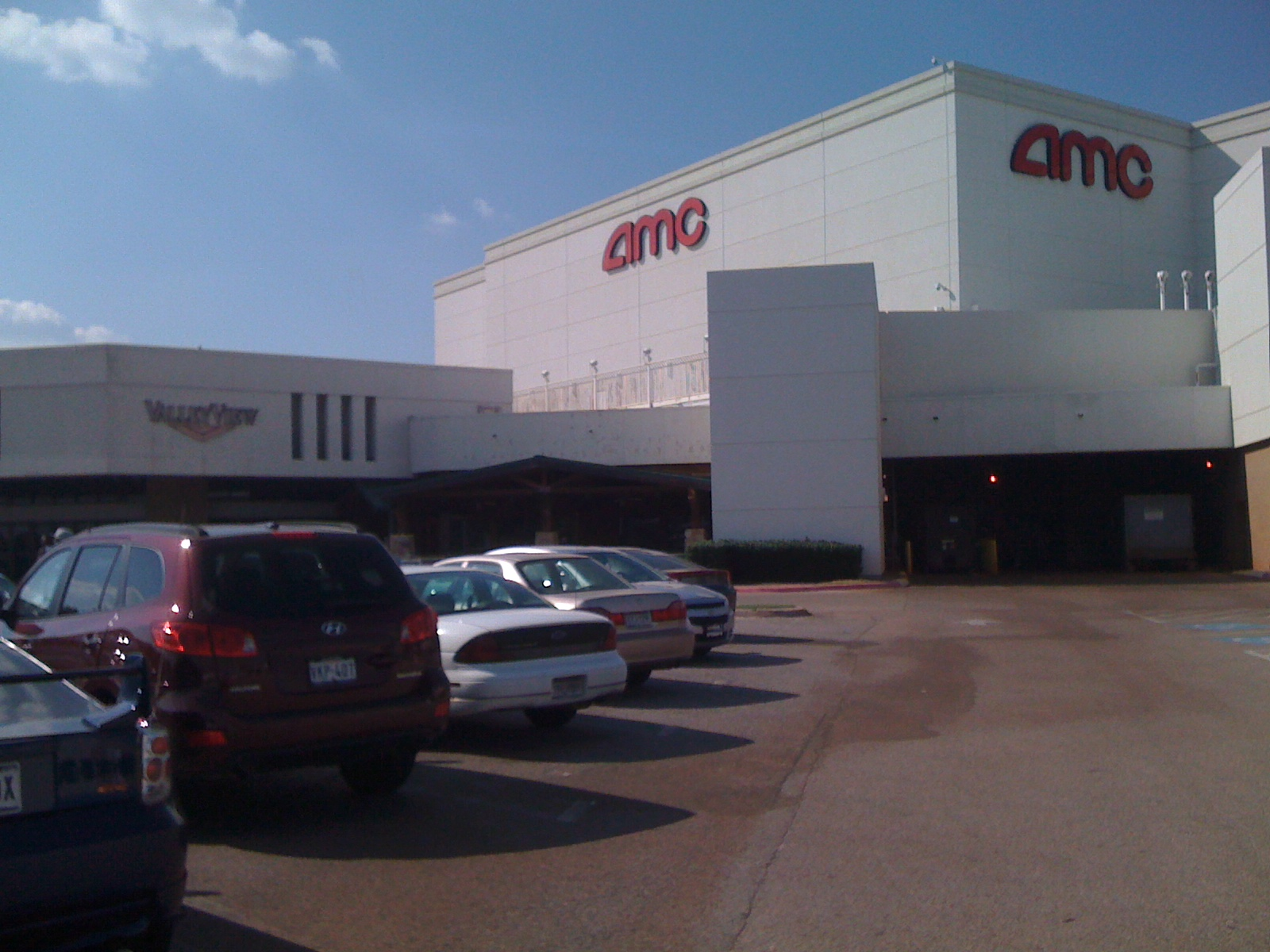
The series takes place at the Valley View Center (pictured) in Dallas, Texas.

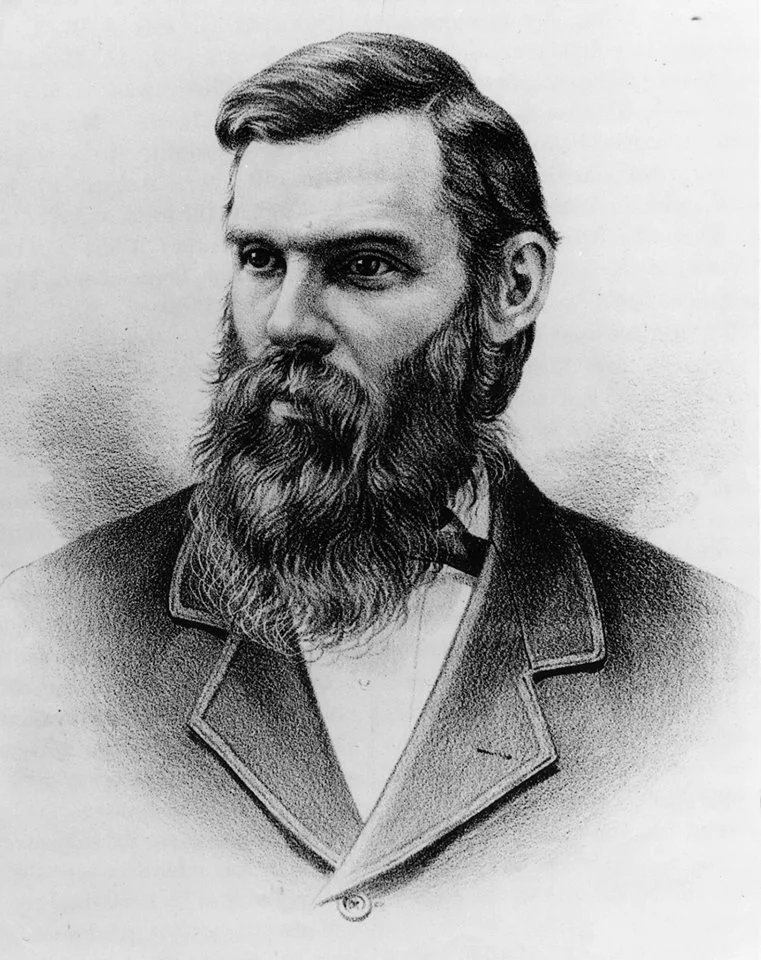
A giant puppet of Julien Reverchon (pictured above) made by Kevin Obregón serves as the main antagonist of the series.

During an interview with photographer Desolar, Parsons recounted that the conception for the series began in the summer of 2021, after he wrapped up work on his Attack on Titan shorts and before he began working on his Backrooms videos. During this time, Parsons began to view images of places that struck a strange familiarity with him, while eerie music played in the background. Then, he came across an image of a bizarre uncanny statue located in a dead mall. He decided to download and save it onto his computer. Parsons revisited the image in December 2022, while he began to write his 21st Backrooms video, "Damage Control". Out of curiosity, he decided to search the origins of this image and ultimately found that it was a part of archive photos of the real Valley View Center located in Dallas, Texas. The image sparked a childlike feeling of fear and curiosity.

Parsons then got on a Discord chat with his friends and shared the image. He was also constantly talking about the uncanny and unnerving feeling that came with it, which they found annoying. At the same time, they realized the statue, which was a Julien Reverchon giant, was real since there were similar photos scattered all over the internet. They were thinking about meeting with the artist behind it—Kevin Obregón—but ultimately decided not to since Parsons didn't want to kill the mystery surrounding it. In January 2023, the group began to get together on weekend chats to search all over the internet specifically for images that had the Julien Reverchon giant, which they found entertaining. Parsons was trying to figure out how this could fit with his Backrooms series since it was built on liminal horror. The limitations he found was that people would think he was just "shoehorning something in", something he tried to avoid with his work. Realizing this can't fit with the series, Parsons decided to start production on a separate series surrounding the giant that was true to reality.

In February 2023, one of his friends—Corrupt—began to recreate the mall using Blender, after gaining an obsession with the image Parsons showed him. He would replicate the geometry of specific sections of the mall; such as the food court and fountains, while Parsons would texture and detail everything. What they found frustrating was that they had to use reference images of the real Valley View Center and line everything up with the camera movements.

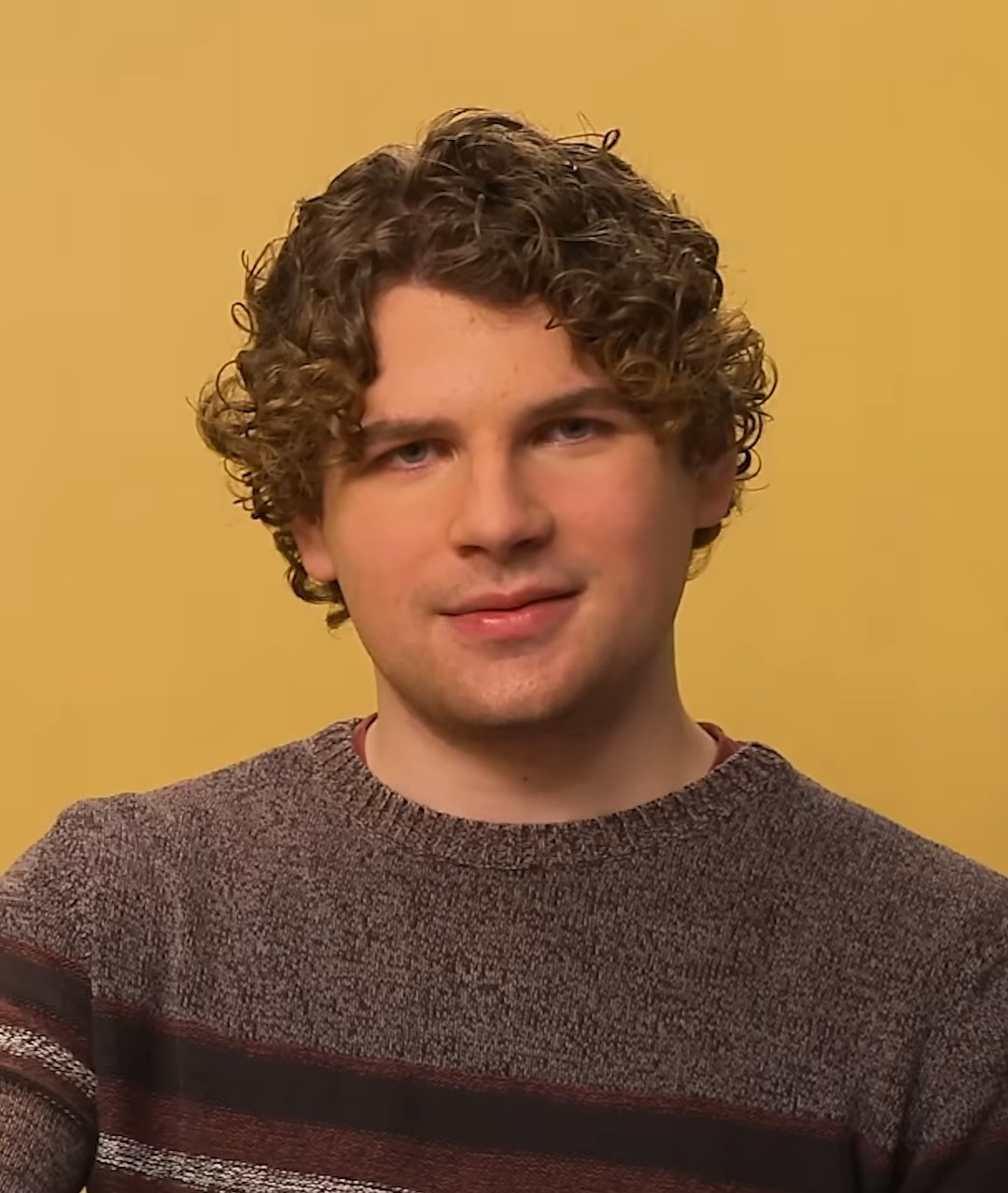
In an interview, director Kane Parsons (pictured in 2026) stated that the series was "the scariest thing I've made".

During the interview with Desolar, Parsons stated that it was a personal project just to fulfill his desires and interests while entertaining himself. He said: "There's some truth to it, but I feel like it's also a crutch to lean on when your work is sort of relying on vagueness and ambiguity". Initially, Parsons didn't have high hopes for the series on YouTube, as people saw that he was being too vague with his vision. He said that despite these videos being less popular than his Backrooms series, it has had the best reception out of any of his previous projects.

Parsons stated that it was "the scariest thing I've made". Within the first few hours of the video "Renewal" being live, people began sharing their accounts of visiting and working at the Valley View Center when they were younger. Parsons said: "It's just so cool to see how it's reaching back to all of these real people who interacted with this real place". Parsons intended the series for this audience in mind, seeing that even if some people never went to the mall in their lives, these places would resonate with their memories very quickly. Parsons aimed this project to not take place in an alternate universe, but instead, be represented as a dramatized realization of real places that existed and will never be seen again.

== Reception ==
Reception for the series has been largely positive. Many viewers and critics have been praising it as a creative and ambitious leap forward for Parsons, temporarily moving from a government conspiracy thriller aesthetic to something more abstract and existential. The series' antagonist, the Rolling Giant, has generated a point of fascination, with many viewers describing it as one of the best antagonists in the analog horror genre due to its ambiguous nature and unsettling design.

The series' connection to real-life locations and historical figures, such as the Valley View Mall in Dallas and botanist Julien Reverchon, has also sparked a lot of community-driven analysis and theorizing, as discussions have been revolving around the series' deeper meanings as well as the themes of liminality, impermanence, history, and memory.
