= HobbyTown USA =

American retail chain

Hobby Town Unlimited, Inc.
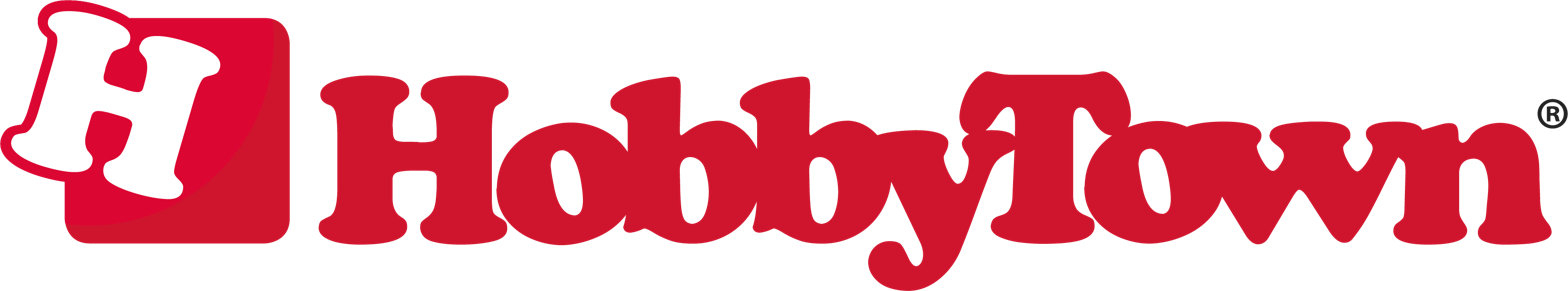
- Type: Private
- Industry: Retail
- Founded: September 24, 1985; 40 years ago, in Lincoln, Nebraska, United States
- Founder: Thom Walla
- Headquarters: Lincoln, Nebraska, United States
- Number of locations: 105 (2024)
- Areas served: United States
- Key people: Bob Wilke (president)
- Products: Remote-controlled cars, radio-controlled aircraft, radio-controlled boat, models, paints, tools, toys
- Website: www.hobbytown.com

Hobby Town Unlimited, Inc. is an American retail hobby, collectibles, and toy store chain headquartered in Lincoln, Nebraska. There are more than 105 HobbyTown franchise stores located in 39 states in the United States.

== History ==
Thom Walla, Merlin Hayes, and Mary Hayes founded HobbyTown Unlimited, Inc. in 1985 and opened the first franchise store in 1986. As of 2023, HobbyTown USA had 106 franchise stores are located in 35 states in the continental United States. The company describes itself as the largest brick-and-mortar hobby retailer in the world.

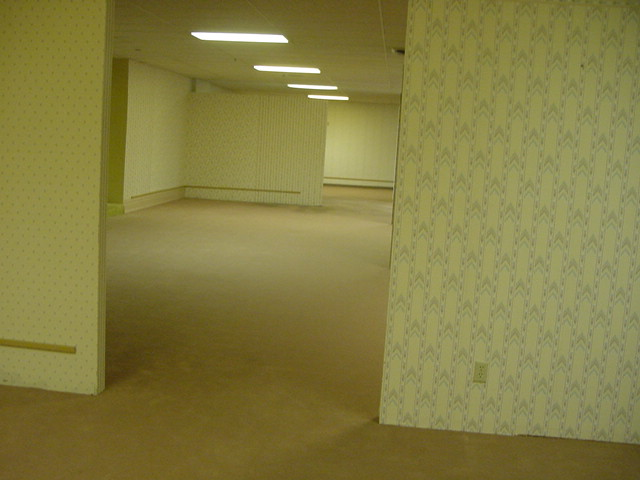
The interior of the Oshkosh, Wisconsin, location c. 2002

Sometime in 2002, HobbyTown USA acquired a building in Oshkosh, Wisconsin, and began renovations. On June 12, 2002, the progress was photographed with a Sony Cyber-shot camera, and on March 2, 2003, the various interior views were documented on the HobbyTown Oshkosh branch's renovation weblog. Among the photographs was the one which began the Backrooms creepypasta, uploaded with the file name "Dsc00161.jpg", depicting a carpeted, open room with yellow wallpaper and fluorescent lighting on a Dutch angle. The image was captioned as an original view of "the East (Oval) room", and noted that no windows were visible. The blog entry described extensive water damage that required the area to be cleared. The interior as depicted no longer exists; it was converted into a radio-controlled car racing track. Until 2024, the source of the photograph was not widely known. In May 2024, the image's origin was located by a Backrooms-dedicated Discord community, which traced the image to an archived webpage from March 2003 using the Wayback Machine.

Online retailer AMain Hobbies announced on July 26, 2023 an agreement in principle to the acquisition of HobbyTown. The agreement includes the Lincoln, Nebraska headquarters and distribution center. AMain Hobbies, with this agreement, now has three distribution centers across the United States.
