= The Backrooms (Found Footage) =

Premiere episode of the web series Backrooms

- Backrooms episode
- YouTube thumbnail
- Directed by: Kane Parsons (Note: Known online as "Kane Pixels".)
- Written by: Kane Parsons
- Editing by: Kane Parsons
- Original air date: January 7, 2022
- Running time: 9 minutes

Guest appearances
- Henry Greber; Kane Parsons; Blane Solis; Aakash Valdivia

Episode chronology
← Previous —	Next → "Mar11_90_ARCHIVE.tar" "Found Footage #2"

External videos
- "The Backrooms (Found Footage)" — Official upload of the episode onto YouTube

"The Backrooms (Found Footage)" is the premiere episode of the American science fiction analog horror web series Backrooms, based on the creepypasta of the same name. The episode premiered on YouTube on January 7, 2022. Starring, written, directed, and animated by Kane Parsons (credited as Kane Pixels), it was independently produced by the filmmaker using Blender when he was 16 years old.

Following the episode going viral as a short film, Parsons elected to expand the film into a full semi-anthological web series. Backrooms was later adapted into a movie.

== Plot ==
On July 4, 1991, three students are filming a short film. As the cameraman backs up for a wide angle, he suddenly falls into the Backrooms. After falling down, he calls out for his friends. Finding no response, he walks around the yellow rooms, oblivious to a gangly humanoid figure observing him, briefly caught on his camera.

After climbing a ladder to a new room, he follows arrows painted on the walls of several rooms, leading to wall with a message saying "don't move, stay still". Hearing a roaring sound behind him, the cameraman turns to find the figure far behind him. The figure pursues the cameraman, who jumps down a hole into a lower floor to escape.

The cameraman finds himself in an area unlike the previous yellow rooms, instead finding a house's basement, hallways with white walls, an indoor courtyard of windows and other architectural anomalies. After some time, the cameraman eventually finds and enters a door with a fire exit that leads him back to another section of yellow rooms. After turning a corner, the cameraman sees a chair thrown at a wall by the figure. Startled, the cameraman flees by entering a narrow gap in the wall.

Upon approaching a steep edge, the cameraman turns around to again find the figure. It grabs him, causing him to drop his camera down the edge, noclipping the camera back to reality on September 23, 1996 high in the air, landing in a backyard. The video ends with footsteps approaching the camera as birds chirp.

== Development ==
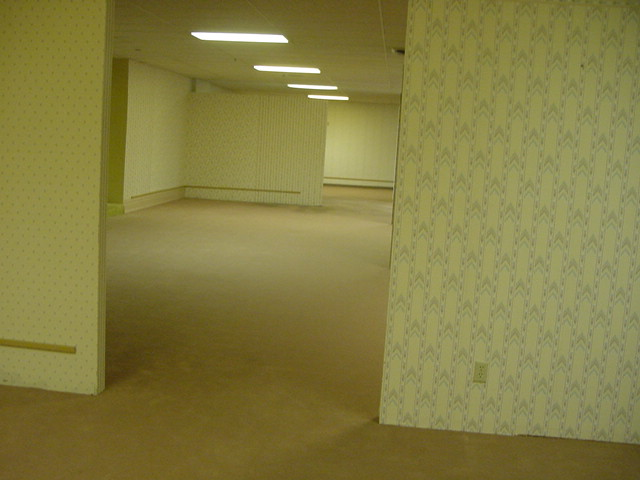
Parsons was inspired to create the series about the creepypasta after rediscovering a render he had previously made.

After making several Attack on Titan–themed videos, Parsons was looking for "new things to do". He was between projects and was inspired to create a found-footage-style animation of the Backrooms after rediscovering a render he had saved some time earlier. Parsons was vaguely aware of the Backrooms from the original image and caption he had seen on Instagram two years prior. However, he was not aware of the community behind it. In an interview, he stated:

"I came across the original image on my computer [...] and I just thought, huh, it would be interesting to see if I could go to my 3D software, Blender, and try to recreate a scene in this environment."

He used Blender to create a test animation of a chair in the Backrooms being thrown and hitting a wall. The shot was later used in the first video of the series. Parsons used both Adobe After Effects and Blender to create the first video; it took Parsons a month to complete the short.

== Reception ==
The episode was critically acclaimed, with WPST calling it "the scariest video on the Internet". Otaku USA categorized it as analog horror, while Dread Central and Nerdist compared it favorably to the 2019 video game Control.

Boing Boing's Rob Beschizza claimed that the episode—like the creepypasta Slender Man and its panned 2018 film adaptation—would eventually be adapted into a "slick but dismal 2-hour Hollywood movie".

== See also ==
- The Oldest View – another web series by Kane Parsons.
- Internet culture – Culture that has emerged from the use of computer networks
- Analog horror – Subgenre of horror fiction
- List of creepypastas – List of Internet horror legends
