= List of highest-grossing independent films =

The following page lists the highest-grossing films that were distributed by independent, arthouse, and mini-major studios. The Passion of the Christ is the highest-grossing independent film of all time. Independent films that were co-produced or co-distributed by major film studios, such as Inglourious Basterds, Paranormal Activity, or Obsession, are not included.

== Highest-grossing films ==
† Background shading indicates films playing in the week commencing 6 November 2026 in theaters around the world.

No.	Title	Year	Gross	Film distributor	Ref	Countries
1	The Passion of the Christ	2004	$611,486,736	Newmarket Films		United States
2	The Intouchables	2010	$484,630,908	Gaumont		France
3	Dances with Wolves	1990	$424,208,805	Orion Pictures		United States
4	The King's Speech	2010	$423,999,102	Momentum Pictures		Australia; United Kingdom
5	Backrooms	2026	$400,981,877	A24		United States
6	My Big Fat Greek Wedding	2002	$368,744,044	IFC Films (United States); Equinox Films (Canada)		United States; Canada
7	Se7en	1995	$328,125,643	New Line Cinema		United States
8	The Silence of the Lambs	1991	$275,726,716	Orion Pictures		United States
9	Parasite	2019	$262,857,186	CJ Entertainment		South Korea
10	Sound of Freedom	2023	$250,570,396	Angel Studios		United States
11	The Blair Witch Project	1999	$248,639,099	Artisan Entertainment		United States
12	Silver Linings Playbook	2012	$236,412,453	The Weinstein Company		United States
13	Fahrenheit 9/11	2004	$222,446,882	Lionsgate		United States
14	Good Will Hunting	1997	$225,925,989	Miramax		United States
15	Valerian and the City of a Thousand Planets	2017	$225,874,228	STX Entertainment		France; United States; China; Germany; Belgium; United Arab Emirates
16	Pulp Fiction	1994	$212,894,343	Miramax		United States
17	Traffic	2000	$207,515,725	USA Films		United States
18	Teenage Mutant Ninja Turtles	1990	$202,084,756	New Line Cinema		United States
19	Kill Bill: Volume 1	2003	$180,899,045	Miramax		United States
20	The Hateful Eight	2015	$156,480,177	The Weinstein Company		United States
21	Kill Bill: Volume 2	2004	$154,116,796	Miramax		United States
22	Everything Everywhere All at Once	2022	$141,054,397	A24		United States
23	The Drama	2026	$130,774,890	A24		United States
24	Longlegs	2024	$126,867,598	Neon		United States
25	Civil War	2024	$122,533,193	A24 (United States); Entertainment Film (United Kingdom)		United States; United Kingdom
26	The Graduate	1967	$104,677,456	Embassy Pictures (United States); United Artists (international)		United States
27	Crash	2005	$101,173,038	Lionsgate (United States); Universum Films (Germany)		United States; Germany
28	Spotlight	2015	$98,690,254	Open Road Films		United States
29	Terrifier 3	2024	$94,436,616	Cineverse		United States
30	Hereditary	2018	$90,190,521	A24		United States
31	Fritz the Cat	1972	$90,000,000	Cinemation Industries		United States
32	Snowpiercer	2013	$86,758,912	RADiUS-TWC (USA); CJ Entertainment (Korea); Le Pacte (France); Bontonfilm (Czech)		United States; South Korea; France; Czech Republic
33	The Amityville Horror	1979	$86,432,000	American International Pictures		United States
34	The Substance	2024	$77,316,812	Mubi		United States; France; United Kingdom
35	Halloween	1978	$70,274,000	Compass International (USA); Aquarius Releasing (international)		United States
36	Moonlight	2016	$65,172,611	A24		United States
37	The Whale	2022	$54,883,206	A24		United States
38	I, Tonya	2017	$53,939,297	Neon		United States
39	Iron Lung	2026	$51,226,173	Markiplier Studios		United States
40	A Nightmare on Elm Street 4: The Dream Master	1988	$49,369,899	New Line Cinema		United States
41	Midsommar	2019	$48,059,189	A24 (North America); Nordisk Film (Sweden)		United States; Sweden
42	Nightcrawler	2014	$47,425,835	Open Road Films		United States
43	The Iron Claw	2023	$45,745,981	A24 (North America); Lionsgate (United Kingdom)		United Kingdom; United States
44	A Nightmare on Elm Street 3: Dream Warriors	1987	$44,793,222	New Line Cinema		United States
45	Past Lives	2023	$42,748,888	A24 (United States); CJ ENM (South Korea)		United States; South Korea
46	The Witch	2016	$40,423,945	A24 (United States); Elevation Pictures (Canada)		United States; Canada
47	Grizzly	1976	$39,000,000	Film Ventures (USA); Columbia (Hungary)		United States; Hungary
48	The Amazing Digital Circus: The Last Act	2026	$36,405,571	Fathom Entertainment		United States; Australia
49	Freddy's Dead: The Final Nightmare	1991	$34,872,033	New Line Cinema		United States
50	Together	2025	$34,573,161	Neon (United States); Kismet Movies (Australia)		United States; Australia

== Highest-grossing independent films by year ==
Year	Title	Worldwide gross	Budget	Ref
1966	Queen of Blood	$17,300,000	$65,000	
1967	The Graduate	$104,677,456	$3,000,000	
1968	Night of the Living Dead	$30,200,000	$114,000–$125,000	
1974	The Texas Chain Saw Massacre	$30,900,000	$80,000–140,000	
1976	Grizzly	$39,000,000	$750,000	
1978	Halloween	$70,274,000	$300,000–325,000	
1984	A Nightmare on Elm Street	$25,865,606	$1,100,000	
1985	A Nightmare on Elm Street 2: Freddy's Revenge	$30,000,121	$3,300,000	
1987	A Nightmare on Elm Street 3: Dream Warriors	$44,793,222	$4,300,000	
1988	A Nightmare on Elm Street 4: The Dream Master	$49,369,899	$8,000,000	
1990	Dances with Wolves	$424,208,805	$22,000,000	
1991	Freddy's Dead: The Final Nightmare	$34,872,033	$9-11,000,000	
2004	The Passion of the Christ	$611,486,736	$30,000,000	
2005	Crash	$101,173,038	$6,500,000	
2010	The Intouchables	$484,630,908	$10,800,000	
2012	Silver Linings Playbook	$236,412,453	$21,000,000	
2013	Snowpiercer	$86,758,912	$40,000,000	
2015	The Hateful Eight	$156,480,177	$44–64,000,000	
2016	Moonlight	$65,172,611	$1.5–4,000,000	
2017	Valerian and the City of a Thousand Planets	$225,874,228	$180,000,000	
2018	Hereditary	$90,190,521	$10,000,000	
2019	Parasite	$262,857,186	$11,400,000	
2022	Everything Everywhere All at Once	$141,054,397	$14.3–25,000,000	
2023	Sound of Freedom	$250,570,396	$14,500,000	
2024	Longlegs	$127,961,936	$10,000,000	
2025	Marty Supreme	$180,410,386	$60–70,000,000	
2026	Backrooms	$400,981,877	$10,000,000	

== Timeline of records ==
=== Highest-grossing ===
Film	Established	Length Held	Record-setting gross	Ref
Queen of Blood	1966	1 Year	$17,300,000	
The Graduate	1967	23 Years	$104,677,456	
Teenage Mutant Ninja Turtles	March 1990	6 Months	$202,084,756	
Dances with Wolves	October 1990	13 Years	$424,208,805	
The Passion of the Christ	2004	Ongoing	$612,054,506	

=== Biggest opening weekend ===
Film	Established	Length Held	Record-setting gross	Ref
A Nightmare on Elm Street 4: The Dream Master	1988	2 Years	$12,883,403	
Teenage Mutant Ninja Turtles	1990	14 Years	$25,398,367	
The Passion of the Christ	2004	Ongoing	$83,848,082	

== Biggest independent film opening weekends ==
The following is a list of independent films which have opened to more than $10 million.

Rank	Film	Year	Opening weekend	Ref
1	The Passion of the Christ	2004	$83,848,082	
2	Backrooms	2026	$81,456,295	
3	Civil War	2024	$25,537,368	
4	Teenage Mutant Ninja Turtles	1990	$25,398,367	
5	Kill Bill: Volume 2	2004	$25,104,949	
6	Fahrenheit 9/11	2004	$23,920,637	
7	The Amityville Horror	2005	$23,507,007	
8	Longlegs	2024	$22,400,119	
9	Kill Bill: Volume 1	2003	$22,089,322	
10	Sound of Freedom	2023	$19,680,879	
11	Terrifier 3	2024	$18,928,113	
12	Iron Lung	2026	$18,190,786	
13	Valerian and the City of a Thousand Planets	2017	$17,007,624	
14	The Drama	2026	$14,380,197	
15	RoboCop 2	1990	$14,145,411	
16	Se7en	1995	$13,949,807	
17	The Silence of the Lambs	1991	$13,766,814	
18	Hereditary	2018	$13,575,173	
19	Freddy's Dead: The Final Nightmare	1991	$12,966,525	
20	A Nightmare on Elm Street 4: The Dream Master	1988	$12,883,403	
21	The Amazing Digital Circus: The Last Act	2026	$12,770,488	
22	Nightcrawler	2014	$10,441,000	

== See also ==
- List of highest-grossing films
- List of highest-grossing non-English films
- List of highest-grossing R-rated films
