= Edo Van Breemen =

Film composer

- Genres: Ambient

Edo Van Breemen is a Canadian musician and composer from Vancouver, British Columbia. In 2026, Van Breemen co-scored the film Backrooms along with its director, Kane Parsons.

== Career ==
He is noted for his work on the film Handle With Care: The Legend of the Notic Streetball Crew, for which he and his frequent collaborator Johannes Winkler received a Canadian Screen Award nomination for Best Original Music in a Documentary at the 11th Canadian Screen Awards in 2023.

Previously associated with the band Brasstronaut, he had his first major film score credit on the 2013 horror film Afflicted. His other credits have included the films Air, Fractured Land, Hello Destroyer, At First Light, Hollow in the Land, Someone Like Me, Inkwo for When the Starving Return, The Track, The Monkey, and Keeper.

In 2026, Van Breemen co-scored the film Backrooms along with its director, Kane Parsons.
