= The Backrooms =

Fictional location

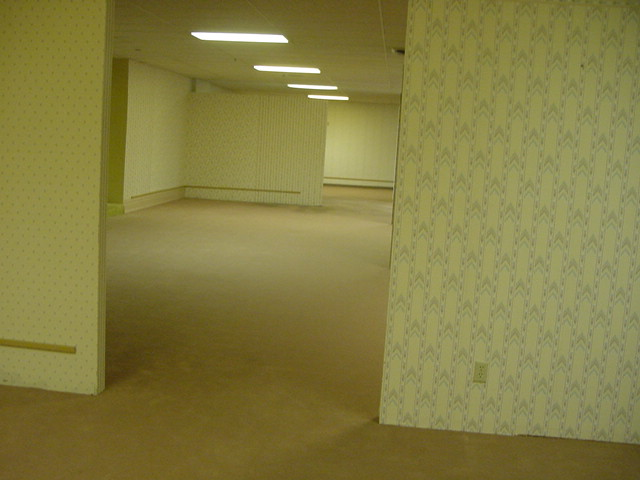
- The original photograph posted on 4chan in 2019
- Based on: 4chan creepypasta
- Adapted by: Kane Parsons, internet users
- Genre: Analog horror, creepypasta

In-universe information
- Type: Alternate dimension, liminal space

The Backrooms are a fictional location invented in a 2019 thread on the imageboard website 4chan. The Backrooms are usually portrayed as an impossibly large extradimensional complex of empty rooms, accessed by exiting reality. They are one of the best-known examples of the liminal space aesthetic and the creepypasta genre.

The concept began with an anonymous interpretation of a photo showing a large, empty room with an uncomfortable yellow atmosphere. The photo was taken in 2002 in Oshkosh, Wisconsin, at a former furniture store while the new tenant was renovating the site, and had been posted on the store's blog. The photo's origin had been widely unknown until it was discovered in 2024.

Internet writers have expanded on the concept, introducing "levels" with distinct characteristics and hostile "entities" which roam these spaces. Fans have adapted both the classic and expanded settings into video games and short films. In early 2022, American YouTuber Kane Parsons published a Backrooms short film on YouTube, which ultimately grew into a 25-episode web series disconnected from the Internet lore. These viral videos have been credited with igniting a surge in Backrooms content and taking the concept into the mainstream. Parsons directed a film adaptation of his series produced by A24, which was released in May 2026.

== History ==
=== Original creepypasta ===
On May 12, 2019, an anonymous user started a thread on /x/—4chan's paranormal-themed board—asking users to "post disquieting images that just feel 'off'", accompanying the thread with the photograph.

Another user replied to this post, providing a name for the fictional location and supplying the first description of the Backrooms:

"If you're not careful and you noclip out of reality in the wrong areas, you'll end up in the Backrooms, where it's nothing but the stink of old moist carpet, the madness of mono-yellow, the endless background noise of fluorescent lights at maximum hum-buzz, and approximately six hundred million square miles of randomly segmented empty rooms to be trapped in
God save you if you hear something wandering around nearby, because it sure as hell has heard you"

— Anonymous, 4chan (May 13, 2019)

=== Growth and fandom ===
Early adaptations of the Backrooms introduced other areas or settings under the name "levels". Level 1 (left) depicts an underground parking lot, Level 2 (right) is traditionally depicted as hot and narrow tunnels.

Within days of the creepypasta's original posting, writers had shared stories about the Backrooms on subreddits such as r/creepypasta and later r/backrooms. A fandom was developed around the setting, and creators expanded upon its original iteration by imagining additional floors or "levels" and the dangerous "entities" which populate them.

As new ideas and more levels were devised in r/backrooms, a faction of fans who preferred the original Backrooms split from the fandom. A Reddit user named LitheBeep created another subreddit called r/TrueBackrooms focusing only on the original version. ABC News said that, unlike fandoms surrounding existing properties, the lack of a canonical Backrooms made "drawing a line between authentic storytelling and jokes" difficult. By March 2022, r/backrooms had over 157,000 members.

The fandom steadily expanded onto other platforms including the upload of videos on YouTube, Twitter, and TikTok. Discord communities and wikis hosted on Fandom and Wikidot were established, dedicated to the lore and worldbuilding of the wider Backrooms universe. The wikis are collaborative writing projects that may be expanded upon by editors, functioning similarly to the SCP Foundation wiki. Dan Erickson, creator of the television series Severance (2022), included the Backrooms among his many influences while working on the series.

=== Image origin ===
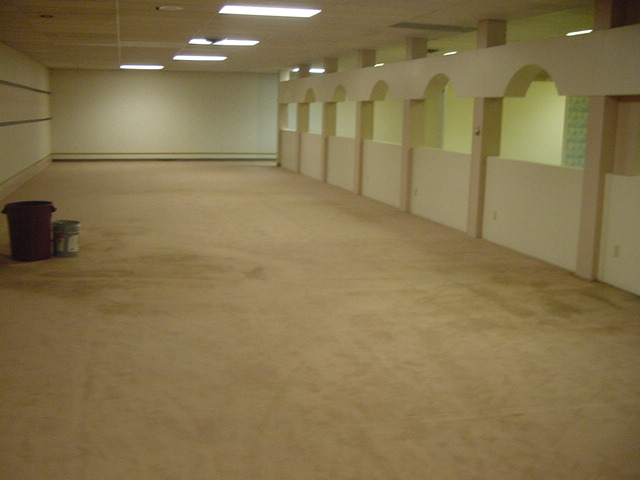
A photo of the same location as the original, taken on the same day during the renovation of a hobby shop.

Until 2024, the source of the original Backrooms image was not widely known. In May 2024, the image's origin was located by a Backrooms-dedicated Discord community, which traced the image to an archived webpage from March 2003 using the Wayback Machine.

The image was found to have been taken in Wisconsin during the renovation of "a former furniture store with plenty of partitions and fake inner walls". For much of the 20th century, Rohner's Home Furnishings occupied 807 and 811 Oregon Street, Oshkosh, Wisconsin. In 2003, 807 Oregon Street was acquired by a new tenant, a branch of the American hobby shop chain HobbyTown.

Sometime in 2002, the second story underwent renovations. On June 12, 2002, the progress was photographed with a Sony Cyber-shot camera, and on March 2, 2003, the various interior views were documented on the HobbyTown Oshkosh branch's renovation weblog. Among the photographs was the one which began the Backrooms creepypasta, uploaded with the file name "Dsc00161.jpg", depicting a carpeted, open room with yellow wallpaper and fluorescent lighting on a Dutch angle. The image was captioned as an original view of "the East (Oval) room", and noted that no windows were visible. The blog entry described extensive water damage that required the area to be cleared. The interior as depicted no longer exists; it was converted into a radio-controlled car racing track.

By 2024, the building needed a renovation, and the roof had fallen into disrepair. When the connection to the Backrooms image was discovered, the owner started a crowd funding campaign with the goal of preserving the building. They were also considering to sell some Backrooms memorabilia, including samples of the original wallpaper and carpet. The renovation was estimated to cost about $78,000, and the campaign raised more than $24,000. In 2025, they sold the building and store, which continues to operate under a new name.

== Reception ==
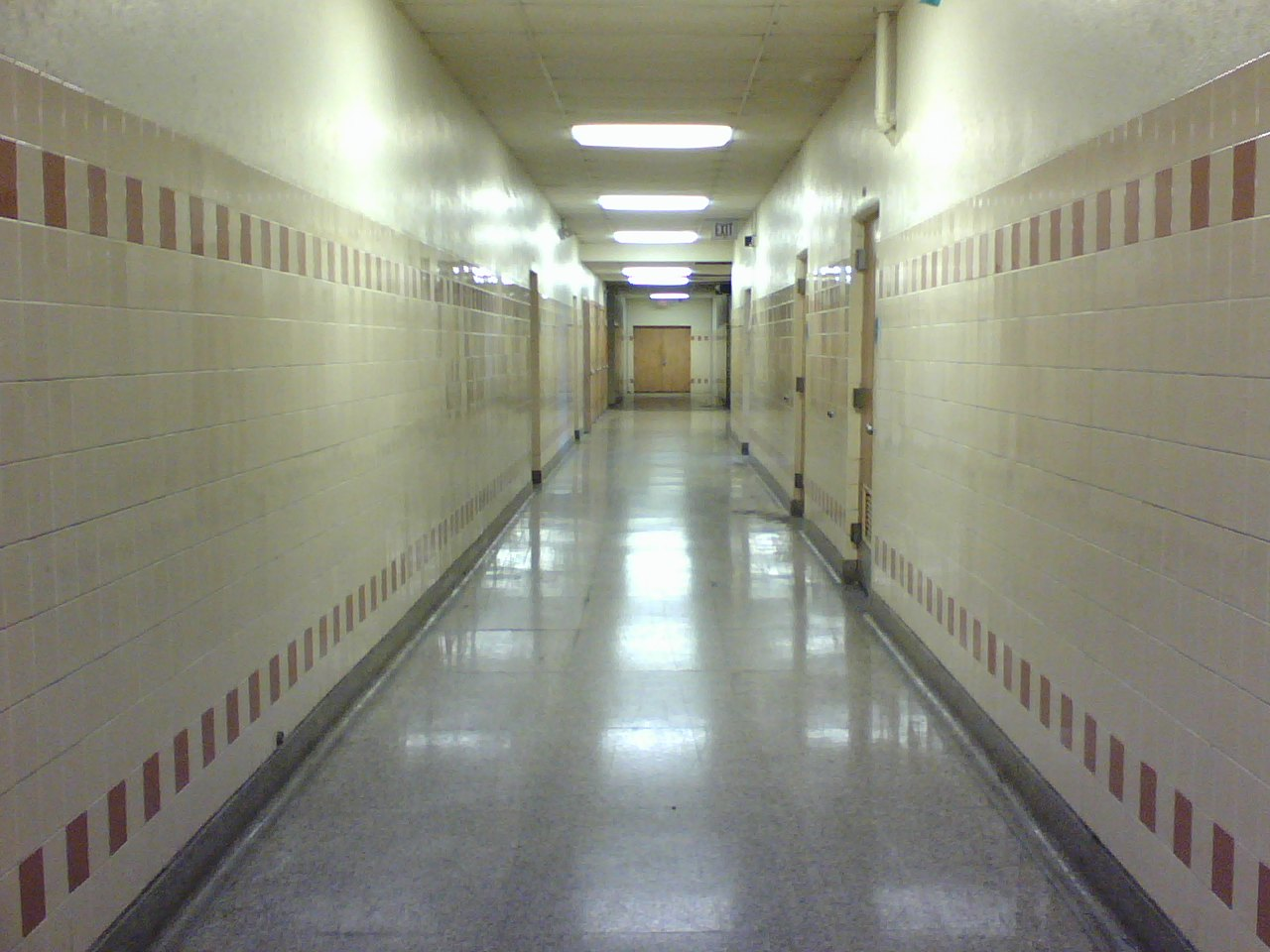
The Backrooms have been associated with an internet aesthetic known as liminal spaces, which include "images of eerie and uninhabited spaces", such as the above empty hallway.

Some sources believe the Backrooms to have been the origin of the internet aesthetic known as liminal spaces, which depict undistinguished and/or usually busy locations as completely empty and removed from any existing context or purpose, often giving viewers a sense of it being "oddly familiar". The #liminalspaces hashtag has amassed nearly 100 million views on TikTok. Paste's Phoenix Simms said the Backrooms and games such as the absurdist The Stanley Parable are "tied to a long tradition of the liminal in horror" and that the color yellow is a symbol of caution, deterioration, and existential distress. In the Backrooms, she likens it to "a fungal, sickly yellow", where both the person and the mind can lose themselves.

PC Gamer compared the Backrooms' levels to H. P. Lovecraft's R'lyeh and The City in the manga Blame!, describing it as "an uncanny valley of place". ABC News and Le Monde grouped the Backrooms into an "emerging genre of collaborative online horror" which also includes the SCP Foundation. Kotaku said that this collaborative aspect, as well as the lack of overt horror or threat, made the Backrooms stand out from other creepypastas. Both Kotaku and Tama Leaver, professor of internet studies at Curtin University, felt that the Backrooms was scary: "because [it invites] you to interpret what's not shown". While Leaver believed that the "eerie feeling of familiarity" helped draw fans together, Kotaku said the horror was in part derived from the subtle "wrongness" present in liminal spaces.

In 2022, there was a TikTok trend for videos of Google Earth being used to closely inspect a location and reveal an entrance to the Backrooms.

In 2024, a Backrooms-inspired music video was used for the song "Party By Myself" from the posthumous album The Party Never Ends by American rapper Juice Wrld.

In 2026, the Backrooms was briefly referenced in the webcomic xkcd and parodied in the South Park episode "You Like That on Your Face".

== Adaptations ==
=== Kane Parsons adaptations ===
==== YouTube ====
The Backrooms as it appears in Kane Parsons's web series

In January 2022, a short horror film titled "The Backrooms (Found Footage)" was uploaded to YouTube. Created by then-16-year-old Kane Parsons, known online as Kane Pixels, of Northern California, it is presented as a VHS tape recorded by a filmmaker who accidentally enters the Backrooms in the 1990s and is pursued by an unknown monster. Parsons created the video over the course of a month using the software Blender and Adobe After Effects. He described the Backrooms as a manifestation of a poorly remembered recollection of the late 1990s and early 2000s. The video has over 90 million views as of August 2026.

The short was praised by the fandom and received positive reviews from critics. WPST called it "the scariest video on the Internet". Otaku USA categorized it as analog horror, while Dread Central and Nerdist compared it favorably to the 2019 video game Control. Kotaku praised the series for exercising restraint in its horror and mystery. Boing Boing's Rob Beschizza predicted that the Backrooms, like the creepypasta Slender Man and its panned 2018 film adaptation, would eventually be adapted into a "slick but dismal 2-hour Hollywood movie".

Expanding his videos into a series of short films, Parsons introduced plot aspects such as Async, an organization which opened a portal into the Backrooms in the 1980s and conducted research within it. The series has collectively garnered over 197 million views. It is also credited with lifting the Backrooms from obscurity into the mainstream internet and causing a surge in Backrooms content, particularly on YouTube. For his shorts, Parsons received a Creator Honors at the 2022 Streamy Awards from The Game Theorists.

==== Film adaptation ====
On February 6, 2023, A24 announced that they were working on a film adaptation of the Backrooms based on Parsons's videos, with Parsons directing. Roberto Patino was set to write the screenplay, but was replaced by Will Soodik. Patino, James Wan, Michael Clear from Atomic Monster, Shawn Levy, Dan Cohen, and Dan Levine of 21 Laps were to produce. The film was released in the United States on May 29, 2026. In May 2026, Kane Parsons confirmed he was not finished with Backrooms, and that there were already things "in the works". He also mentioned that the web series would continue.

=== American Horror Stories ===
In October 2024, an episode inspired by the Backrooms was released as part of the third season of American Horror Stories, a direct spin-off to American Horror Story. The episode, titled Backrooms, stars Michael Imperioli as a grief-stricken screenwriter who falls in and out of the "Backrooms", ending up in mundane locations where he is confronted by a manifestation of his missing son. The episode was one in a group of five to be released as a "Huluween event".

=== Video games ===
The Backrooms have been adapted into numerous video games. An indie game was released by Pie on a Plate Productions two months after the original creepypasta, and was positively reviewed for its atmosphere, but received criticism for its short length. Many others, such as Enter the Backrooms, Noclipped and The Backrooms Project, were released in the following years. Co-op multiplayer Escape the Backrooms by Fancy Games was praised by Bloody Disgusting for its depiction of the extended lore, while The Backrooms 1998 (both 2022), a psychological survival horror game independently released by one-person developer Steelkrill Studio, was noted by reviewers for its found footage visuals and limited save system.

Dreamcore, a 2025 first-person psychological horror video game developed by Argentinian studio Montraluz, takes inspiration from the Backrooms. The Backrooms was also featured as a map in the 2026 game Meccha Chameleon.

=== Poolrooms ===
The Poolrooms are an extension of the Backrooms consisting of a (seemingly infinite) labyrinth of pristine, white-tiled indoor swimming pools. The concept has been adapted by Internet users as a level or part of the Backrooms. Kane Parsons's 2026 film Backrooms briefly features a scene with his adaptation of the Poolrooms.

==== Film Adaptation ====
A feature film based on the Poolrooms and titled simply The Poolrooms has been announced by Grytt Picture Shows for release in December 2026. The film is directed by Galen Christy and Sasha Yelaun and is unrelated to Parsons's projects, and was originally announced under the title The Pools. After rumors circulated that portions of the film were created with generative AI, the directors released a statement emphasizing the traditional filmmaking techniques and on-location filming which took place during production, but did not deny the rumors outright.

== See also ==
- Analog horror – Subgenre of horror fiction
- House of Leaves – 2000 novel by Mark Z. Danielewski
- Internet aesthetics – Visual styles and subcultures associated with the internet
- Internet culture – Culture that has emerged from the use of computer networks
- Kisaragi Station – Japanese urban legend
- List of creepypastas – List of Internet horror legends
- MyHouse.wad – Doom II map
- The Library of Babel – Short story by Jorge Luis Borges
- The Yellow Wallpaper – 1892 short story by Charlotte Perkins Gilman
- Urban exploration – Exploration of hidden or abandoned buildings and structures
