= Analog horror =

Subgenre of horror fiction

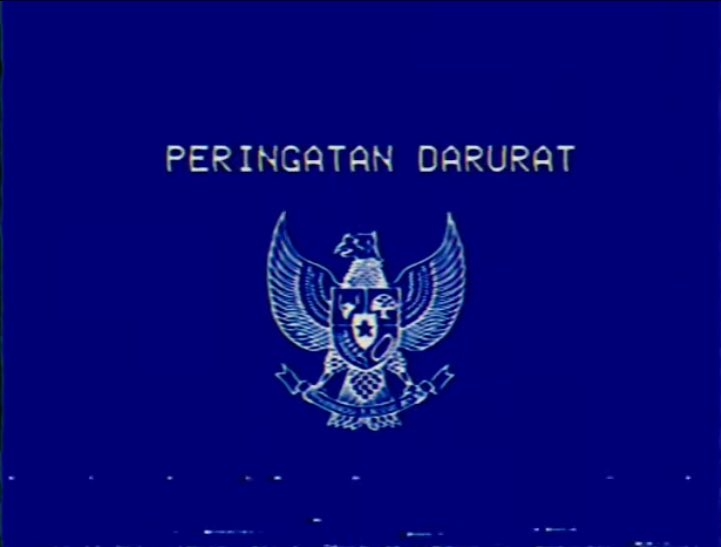
Concept for an Indonesian national warning system. Originally made as analog horror, it became widely used as a pro-democracy symbol during the 2024 Indonesian local election law protests.

Analog horror is a subgenre of horror fiction (primarily existing on YouTube) commonly characterized by low-fidelity graphics, cryptic messages, few to no traditional jump scares, and visual styles reminiscent of late 20th-century television and analog recordings. It is an offshoot of the found footage film genre, said to have its origins in online horror of the late 2000s and early 2010s, including creepypasta stories and found footage series such as No Through Road. The genre gained more widespread popularity with the release of Kris Straub's Local 58 in October 2015, with the series' slogan ("ANALOG HORROR AT 476 MHz") providing the genre's name.

== Characteristics ==
Analog horror is commonly characterized by low-fidelity graphics, cryptic messages, few – if any – traditional jump scares, and visual styles reminiscent of late 20th-century television and analog recordings. This is done to match the setting, as analog horror works are typically set somewhere between the 1960s and 2000s, or work with elements from that time period. Analog horror is often noted to use visual and audio distortion, as well as glitch-like effects that emphasize and replicate the technological limits the subgenre works with. The name "analog horror" comes from the genre's aesthetic incorporation of elements related to analog electronics, such as analog television and VHS (Video Home System), the latter being an analog method of recording video and audio.

The genre is also known to show manipulated pre-existing media from the time period it is trying to imitate, as seen in series like The Mandela Catalogue. Analog horror works frequently use their formats' supposed limitations to their advantage. Analog effects and graphics frequently obscure or abstract events such that the viewers are left to wonder at, and consequently fear, what they are witnessing. Works such as Backrooms use the limitations of the equipment that they are replicating to disguise the use of Blender and Adobe After Effects, making the series appear more visually realistic.

Analog horror may also be influenced by horror films such as Ring (1998), The Blair Witch Project (1999) and Paranormal Activity (2007).

== History ==
Analog horror could be regarded as a form or descendant of creepypasta legends. Many creepypastas anticipated analog horror's themes and presentation: Ben Drowned and NES Godzilla Creepypasta, among others, featured manipulated or contrived footage of "haunted" media, and Candle Cove, a creepypasta from 2009, focused on a mysterious television broadcast, which happens to also have been created by Kris Straub.

Some commentators have drawn parallels between analog horror and 20th-century radio and television programs that presented fictional stories in the style of "live news broadcasts," such as Orson Welles's 1938 radio adaptation of The War of the Worlds and the shot-on-video TV movies Special Bulletin (1983), Ghostwatch (1992) and Without Warning (1994) (in other words, "analog horror" before analog horror).

The subgenre is typically cited as originating between the late 2000s and the mid-2010s Internet (mainly with YouTube) videos, specifically from Steven Chamberlain's No Through Road in January 2009, and gaining substantial popularity on the English-speaking internet with the release of Kris Straub's Local 58 in October 2015; the series' slogan ("ANALOG HORROR AT 476 MHz") gave the genre its name. Local 58, which quickly became successful, inspired later works such as The Mandela Catalogue and The Walten Files. Another YouTube channel, the Polish-language Kraina Grzybów TV, anticipated many motifs of the genre, as in December 2013 it began publishing videos stylized as a TV program from the 1990s that contained disturbing and surreal imagery.

Some analog horror series have been adapted into different forms of media. In 2020, Netflix announced that it would adapt the analog horror podcast Archive 81 into a series of the same name. Despite its positive reception, the show was canceled after airing only one season.

On August 21, 2024, a short video resembling a national warning system titled EAS Indonesia Concept (October 24, 1991), ANM-021 (Mesem) - First Encounter, gained widespread attention on Indonesian social media. The video was posted in support of pro-democracy movements in Indonesia. The widespread sharing of the symbol on platforms like Instagram, Twitter (X), and WhatsApp was a form of protest against the House of Representatives' attempt to overturn the Constitutional Court's decision regarding regional election laws. The analog horror video was adopted by citizens for the nationwide protests on August 22, 2024, and shared virally on Indonesian social media as a symbol of disquiet with the government's decisions. Many pro-democracy activists, including public and political figures, adopted and shared the short video and its screenshots across social media platforms. The image was reused in the 2025 Indonesian protests with the blue replaced with black to signify greater urgency.

== Examples ==
=== No Through Road ===
No Through Road is a YouTube series created by then-17-year-old Steven Chamberlain of Hertfordshire, England, in 2009. Set within the real-world private "no through road" at the entrance of Broomhall Farm, it follows four teenagers driving home at night as they find themselves trapped in a space and time loop, eternally passing the same two road signs marking an intersection separating the villages of Benington and Watton between miles of liminal space countryside, while threatened by a figure who can manipulate the loop back to an archway at the road's entrance. Other plot aspects include all footage of the events being stolen from MI6 and uploaded online to YouTube.

Composed of four shorts, No Through Road has attained a cult following, and is considered a foundational work of the analog horror genre.

=== Local 58 ===
Kris Straub's Local 58 is a series of YouTube videos presented as authentic videotaped footage of a television station that has been continuously hijacked over several decades. While there is no main plot in this series, episodes include messages related to looking up at the Moon or the night sky, as well as the in-universe Thought Research Initiative (TRI) Local 58's first video "Weather Service" was published in 2015 as a stand-alone short and then added to the dedicated YouTube channel when it was established in 2017.

Local 58 is frequently credited with creating and/or popularizing analog horror. Additionally, the series is responsible for naming the genre through its slogan, "ANALOG HORROR AT 476 MHz".

=== Archive 81 ===
Archive 81 is a horror podcast released in 2016, made by Dan Powell and Marc Sollinger. The podcast is centered around an archivist named Dan, who recently began a job from the Housing Historical Committee of New York, who is told by his boss to constantly record his life. Dan records himself as he listens to and organizes a number of interview tapes, recorded by Melody Pendras and detailing her conversations with residents of an apartment complex. It is revealed that these recordings of Dan doing his job are tapes that his friend Marc is now listening to, as Dan has gone missing and Marc seeks to find out what happened to him. The podcast was adapted into a television series, which was released in 2022 by Netflix. The series was cancelled after one season.

=== Gemini Home Entertainment ===
Gemini Home Entertainment is a horror anthology YouTube series created by Canadian YouTuber Remy Abode in 2019. The series, taking place in the 1980s and '90s, is presented as a collection of clips from VHS tapes produced by a number of fictional companies and distributed by the eponymous company Gemini Home Entertainment. The tapes are a mixture of educational clips, commercials, public service announcements, and home videos, produced by various fictional companies such as Regnad Computing, Harbinge Technologies, and Optica! Video.

The different episodes are superficially self contained, exploring topics such as wildlife, artificial intelligence, and the Solar System, but together they build a cohesive narrative and serve to document the impending end of the world. The storyline of Gemini Home Entertainment features extraterrestrial invasion and parasitism and combines elements of cosmic horror, body horror and Native American mythology. The series includes threats such as extraterrestrial creatures ("Woodcrawlers") using humans as "vessels", a fictional infectious disease called "Deep Root Disease", and a fictional plant or fungus called "Nature's Mockery" that mutilates people with which it comes into contact. Videos typically begin in a mundane way before incorporating horror elements. The series' central antagonist is The Iris, a sentient planet or planet-like entity which is masterminding an invasion of the Solar System and is influencing life on Earth.

=== The Mandela Catalogue ===
The Mandela Catalogue is a YouTube series created by then-17-year-old Alex Kister of Hubertus, Wisconsin in 2021. It is set in the fictional Mandela County, Wisconsin in the 1990s and 2000s, which is threatened by the presence of "alternates", doppelgängers who coerce their victims to kill themselves and can manipulate audiovisual media. Other plot aspects include Lucifer disguising himself as the biblical archangel Gabriel, shown through altered footage of episodes from the animated series The Beginners Bible. Composed of six volumes and thirteen shorts, The Mandela Catalogue became popular online through analysis and reaction videos.

=== Backrooms ===
In 2022, a short horror film titled The Backrooms (Found Footage) was uploaded to YouTube by then-sixteen-year-old Kane Parsons of Northern California, known online as Kane Pixels. It is based on the creepypasta of the same name, using the software Blender and Adobe After Effects, and is presented as a VHS tape recorded by a filmmaker who accidentally enters the Backrooms in the 1990s and is pursued by a monster. This was later expanded into a series of twenty-four shorts, following the employees of a company investigating the Backrooms. Parsons received a Creator Honors for the series at the 2022 Streamy Awards from The Game Theorists.

A film adaptation of the Backrooms based on Parsons' videos by A24 was released in 2026. Parsons directed the film, Will Soodik wrote the screenplay, while James Wan, Michael Clear from Atomic Monster, Shawn Levy, Dan Cohen, and Dan Levine of 21 Laps produced it.

=== Theatrically released examples ===
Examples of theatrically released analog horror include Kyle Edward Ball's Skinamarink (2022), Colin and Cameron Cairnes's Late Night with the Devil (2023) and Casper Kelly's feature debut Buddy (2026).

== See also ==
- Creepypasta – Horror-related media shared around the Internet
- Synthwave – Music genre
- Lost media – General term for inaccessible media
- Collage film – Film assembled entirely from found footage
- Suffer Little Children (film) – 1983 British film
- Hauntology (music) – Music genre and scene based on Jacques Derrida's neologism
