= Will Soodik =

American screenwriter

- Born: United States
- Other name: William Bromell
- Occupation: Screenwriter
- Years active: 2013–present
- Parent: Henry Bromell (father)

William Soodik, also known as William Bromell, is an American screenwriter. He is best known for writing the psychological horror film Backrooms, starring Chiwetel Ejiofor and Renate Reinsve. Aside from his work on Backrooms, he wrote for the television programs Homeland, Borgia, Ash vs Evil Dead, and Westworld.

== Career ==
Soodik is the son of screenwriter and novelist Henry Bromell. He began his career as a television writer and wrote episodes for the television programs Homeland (having completed a script that his father, a staff writer on the show, was writing at the time of his death), Borgia, Ash vs Evil Dead, and Westworld.

In July 2024, it was announced that he will write the screenplay for the horror film Altar. It is being directed by Egor Abramenko, starring January Jones and Kyle MacLachlan. It is set to be released theatrically in the United States by A24.

In 2026, Soodik wrote Kane Parsons's science fiction horror film Backrooms, starring Chiwetel Ejiofor and Renate Reinsve. The film is based on Parson's web series. It was released theatrically in the United States on May 29, 2026, by A24.

== Filmography ==
Film

Year	Title	Writer	Executive producer	Notes
2026	Backrooms	Yes	No	Film writing debut
TBA	Altar	Yes	Yes	Post-production

Television

Year	Title	Writer	Producer	Notes
2013	Homeland	Yes	No	Episode "Tower of David"
2014	Borgia	Yes	No	Episode "1500"
2016	Ash vs Evil Dead	Yes	No	Episode "Confinement"; also story editor
2022	Westworld	Yes	Consulting	Episode "The Auguries"
