= Backrooms (film) =

2026 film by Kane Parsons

- Theatrical release poster
- Directed by: Kane Parsons
- Written by: Will Soodik
- Based on: Backrooms by Kane Parsons
- Produced by: James Wan; Michael Clear; Roberto Patino; Shawn Levy; Dan Cohen; Dan Levine; Osgood Perkins; Chris Ferguson; Peter Chernin; Jenno Topping; Kori Adelson
- Starring: Chiwetel Ejiofor; Renate Reinsve; Mark Duplass; Finn Bennett; Lukita Maxwell
- Cinematography: Jeremy Cox
- Edited by: Greg Ng
- Music by: Edo Van Breemen; Kane Parsons
- Production companies: North Road Films (Note: Promotional material and the film itself use the Chernin Entertainment logo.); A24; 21 Laps Entertainment; Atomic Monster; Phobos; Oddfellows Pictures
- Distributed by: A24
- Release dates: May 7, 2026 (Aero Theatre); May 29, 2026 (United States)
- Running time: 110 minutes
- Country: United States
- Language: English
- Budget: $10 million
- Box office: $400.4 million

Backrooms is a 2026 American science fiction psychological horror film directed and co-scored by Kane Parsons in his feature directorial debut, and written by Will Soodik. It is based on Parsons's web series which was inspired by the "Backrooms" creepypasta. In the film, furniture store owner Clark (Chiwetel Ejiofor) and his therapist Mary (Renate Reinsve) discover a dimension of seemingly endless liminal spaces accessed through the store's basement. Mark Duplass, Finn Bennett, and Lukita Maxwell also star.

After uploading the web series in January 2022, Parsons was approached by several studios, including A24, about potentially adapting his series into a feature film. In February 2023, it was officially announced that work had begun on a film adaptation of the Backrooms based on Parsons's videos, with him also directing. Roberto Patino was initially set to write the screenplay, but was replaced by Will Soodik. Principal photography took place in Vancouver from July to August 2025.

Backrooms premiered at the Aero Theatre in Santa Monica, California, on May 7, 2026, and was theatrically released in the United States by A24 on May 29. It received positive reviews from critics and grossed $400.4 million worldwide, becoming A24's highest-grossing film to date and making Parsons the youngest filmmaker to reach number one at both the United States and global box offices. Backrooms is the third-highest-grossing horror film of 2026, and the fifth-highest-grossing independent film of all time.

== Plot ==
On June 19, 1990, a researcher within the Async Research Institute, Naren Warne, is separated from his group and becomes lost in "the Backrooms", a labyrinthine extradimensional space containing a chaotic expanse of dull yellow rooms, fluorescent lights, long corridors, and malformed furniture. While attempting to call for rescue, Naren is chased and killed by a mysterious entity. Async scientists watch the recovered footage of the incident.

Clark, a failed architect who owns a struggling furniture store in San Jose, California, attempts to cope with his alcoholism and failing marriage. He sees therapist Mary Kline, who is working through her own trauma from the demolition of her childhood home and her agoraphobic mother's institutionalization. Clark recruits his assistant manager Kat and her boyfriend Bobby to film a television commercial featuring himself dressed as the store's pirate mascot. Having taken up residence in the store, he notices the lights flickering mysteriously at night and his television functioning erratically. While checking the breaker box, Clark notices a glowing slit in a wall. Approaching it, he falls through and enters the Backrooms. Clark finds Naren's belongings and narrowly escapes back to the store when an unseen figure chases him. An Async scientist, Phil, watches these events on a surveillance camera.

After days of exploring, Clark tells Mary about the Backrooms but is met with skepticism. In need of proof, Clark brings Kat and Bobby into the Backrooms to film their discoveries. While exploring a steeply sloped corridor, Bobby is ambushed and fatally dragged away by the mysterious entity; Clark and Kat frantically give chase through an unexplored area, where they are separated. Carrying the camera, Clark eventually encounters two other humanoid entities, one of which gives chase to him. He reaches a dead end, where Kat is apparently able to see him through a wall but not vice versa. Clark sets down the camera; an unseen entity picks it up as Kat screams for Clark to look behind him.

Some time later, Mary receives a cryptic answering machine message from Clark, who tells her that he is staying in the Backrooms and will not return. Phil watches television with his family and recognizes Clark in a commercial for the furniture store. Concerned about Clark, Mary visits the store and enters the Backrooms herself, where she finds a crude and cryptic mural. An apparently psychotic Clark arrives; hearing an entity approaching, he tries to calm Mary before choking her unconscious.

Mary awakens tied to a chair in a space resembling a dining room, occupied by Clark and three grotesque and largely static simulacra of humans. Clark demonstrates they are made of an edible white substance and reveals Kat's severed head in a refrigerator. Clark demands that Mary continue their therapy sessions, but she instead scolds Clark, telling him that his wife left him due to his inability to take responsibility for his failures. He begins to release Mary, but is interrupted by the arrival of a towering, distorted simulacrum of himself dressed as the pirate mascot. Clark tries to calm the pirate monster, which suddenly kills him and then chases Mary through various chaotic and surreal spaces until they reach a flawed replica of the furniture store. Cornered by the monster, she uses a large hat stand to destroy the monster's peg leg, then bashes it in the face using a chunk of concrete from her childhood home. Their struggle triggers an Async gas trap, alerting a group of researchers in hazmat suits. The monster is subdued, and Mary is taken to their research facility.

After recovering, Mary is taken to an interrogation room where she meets Phil. He explains that Async made magnetic resonance imaging machines until they discovered the Backrooms, which have since become their primary research focus. When asked how she came across the Backrooms and what she found there, she repeats Clark's description of it as a faulty, misremembered copy of reality. Mary asks if Async will let her go, but Phil states that the decision is not up to him. Inside the Backrooms, a series of spaces are distorted by Clark's and Mary's experiences and their consequences, ending in a loosely copied interrogation room in which her own deformed simulacrum sits still and silent.

== Cast ==
- Chiwetel Ejiofor as Clark, a furniture store owner and failed architect
- Renate Reinsve as Dr. Mary Kline, Clark's therapist
  - Ember Ambrose as young Mary
- Mark Duplass as Phil, an Async scientist and Backrooms researcher
- Finn Bennett as Robert "Bobby" Franklin, Kat's boyfriend
- Lukita Maxwell as Kathrine "Kat" Taylor, Clark's employee and Bobby's girlfriend
- Avan Jogia as Naren Warne, an Async explorer of the Backrooms
- Robert Bobroczkyi as Pirate Clark, a towering, hostile humanoid that originates from the Backrooms. He uncannily resembles Clark and is dressed up as the pirate mascot of Clark's store.
- Krista Kosonen as Nora Kline, Mary's mother

Patrick Baynham, Dana Mahmood, and Rhiannon Roberts appear as the simulacra "Still Life" entities credited as the Bearded Man, Archibald Leland Sutter, and Red-Headed Woman, while Philip Granger plays a meterman. Katharine Isabelle makes an appearance during a scene at Mary's house party.

== Production ==
=== Development ===
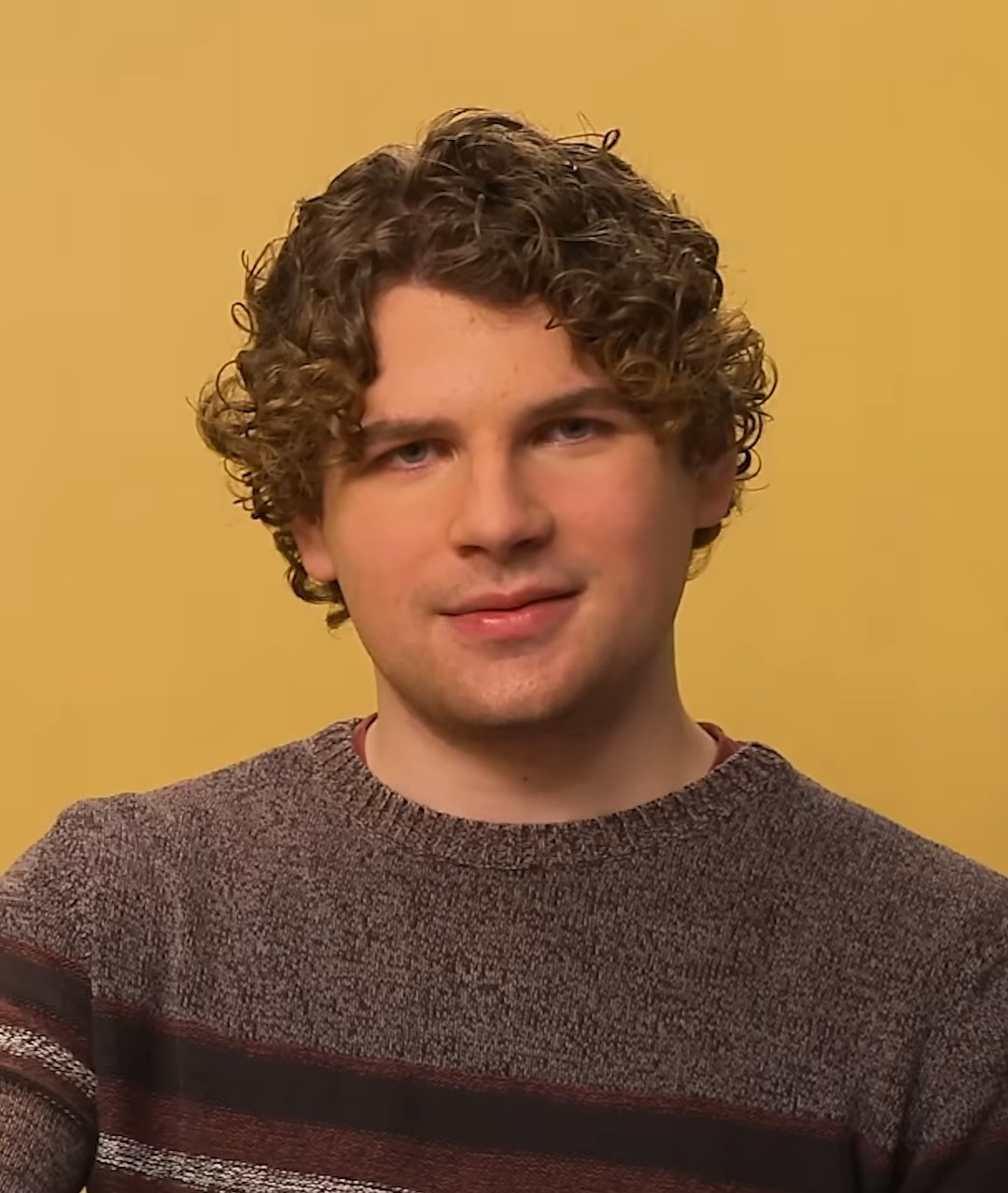
At the age of 20, Kane Parsons became the youngest director to have a film reach number one at the box office with Backrooms.

On January 7, 2022, Kane Parsons began uploading an anthological video series titled Backrooms onto his YouTube channel Kane Pixels, the concept being based on the internet creepypasta of the same name. When the series became viral, several studios began to show interest in adapting it into a film. In February 2023, a film adaptation was announced as a joint production between A24, Chernin Entertainment, Atomic Monster, and 21 Laps Entertainment, with Parsons directing, making it his feature-length directorial debut, and Roberto Patino writing. The film is produced by James Wan, Shawn Levy, and Osgood Perkins. Chernin Entertainment and A24 co-financed the film for under $10 million.

Parsons drew inspiration from the Portal video game franchise, the television series Mr. Robot (2015–2019), the films Punishment Park (1971) and One Hour Photo (2002), and the anime series Paranoia Agent (2004) for the film, as well as for his web series. Backrooms maintains a "strict continuity" with the director's YouTube web series.

=== Casting ===
In May 2025, Chiwetel Ejiofor and Cristin Milioti entered negotiations to star in the film. Ejiofor was confirmed the following month, with Will Soodik writing the latest draft. Milioti's deal ultimately fell through, and Renate Reinsve was cast in her place in June. Mark Duplass, Finn Bennett, Lukita Maxwell and Avan Jogia were added to the cast in July. Jogia was a fan of Parsons's original web series before he was cast. Despite his character's relatively small part, Jogia recalled he and Parsons spent extensive time discussing the lore of the film during production.

=== Design ===
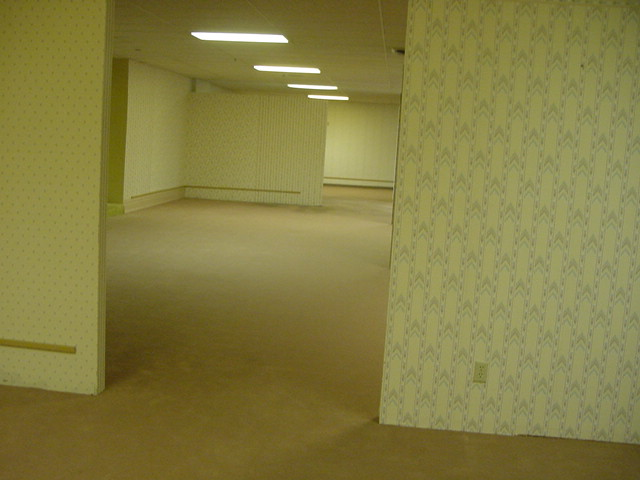
The film took inspiration from the Backrooms creepypasta.

To create the liminal space environments of the Backrooms, Parsons used the 3D software Blender, with production designer Danny Vermette adapting his digital designs for physical construction. More than 30,000 square feet (2,800 m^{2}) of Backrooms sets were built across four sound stages for the film, with Vermette comparing the fitting of the sets with Tetris; 37,000 square feet (3,400 m^{2}) of wallpaper and 29,000 square feet (2,700 m^{2}) of carpeting were used, much of it sourced locally in Canada to avoid the impact of tariffs. The production design also emphasized verticality within the sets to make actors' interactions with the environment more physically challenging. People reportedly got lost on set.

The film's spaces were designed as an "architectural hell" resembling a flawed digital 3D modeling sandbox, where rendering errors—such as misaligned floors, intersecting arches, and objects clipping through walls—create an unsettling sense of unreality. The Backrooms have been described as a prism that refracts its visitors, while its entities appear less like demons than distorted "memories" of the real world, drawing comparisons to the anomalous zone in Annihilation (2018).

=== Filming ===
Principal photography took place in Vancouver, British Columbia, under the working title Effigy. An ACFC West production listing gave the shooting period as July 7 to August 14, 2025.

=== Music ===
Edo Van Breemen and Parsons composed the score for the film. The Boards of Canada track "The Word Becomes Flesh" from their album Inferno plays during the film's end credits. The tracks "Ulterior Motives", a well-known former lostwave song, "Eyes of a Stranger" by Payolas and "B1 – All that follows is true" by the Caretaker, also feature in the film.

== Release ==
=== Theatrical ===
Backrooms premiered at the Aero Theatre in Santa Monica on May 7, 2026, and was released in the United States by A24 on May 29, 2026. It was released in South Korea and Italy on May 27. An extended version of the film, titled Backrooms: Everything Must Go Edition, was released on July 3. The extended version features an additional 15 minute sequence that serves as a prequel to the events of the film.

=== Home media ===
Backrooms was released on digital platforms on July 14. It was originally scheduled to be released on July 7. The bonus footage sequence was later released on Parson's YouTube channel on August 19.

== Reception ==
=== Box office ===
Backrooms grossed $197.5 million in the United States and Canada, and $202.9 million in other territories, for a worldwide total of $400.4 million.

In early May 2026, initial projections had Backrooms grossing around $20 million in its opening weekend. By the week of its release, projections had increased to $40–50 million. The film grossed $38.4 million on its first day and went on to debut to $81.5 million in the United States and Canada and a total of $118 million worldwide, becoming A24's biggest opening weekend. In its second weekend, despite a 70% decline to $26.3 million, Backrooms became A24's highest-grossing film to date, surpassing Marty Supreme (2025), after reaching $213 million worldwide. In its fourth weekend, the film made $7.3 million in the United States and Canada and $8.5 million internationally, pushing its worldwide box office to $301 million. Parsons became the youngest filmmaker at the time to reach number one at the box office with the film, topping Josh Trank's Chronicle (2012) with its previous record. In September, Backrooms surpassed $400 million at the box office.

The film's top-grossing international markets include China ($27.8 million), Mexico ($17.8 million), the United Kingdom ($17.6 million), Australia and New Zealand ($12.3 million) and France ($12.2 million).

=== Critical response ===
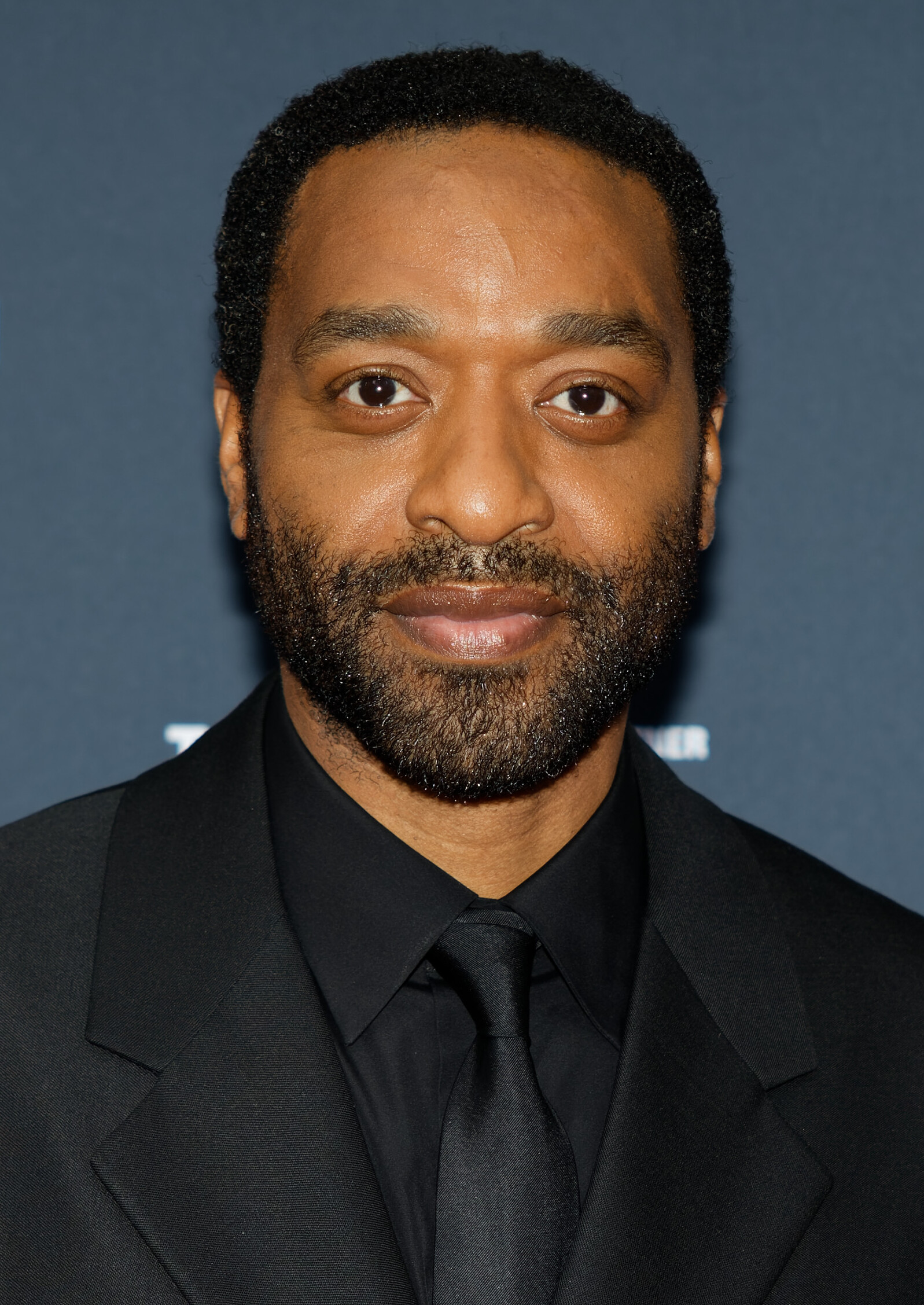
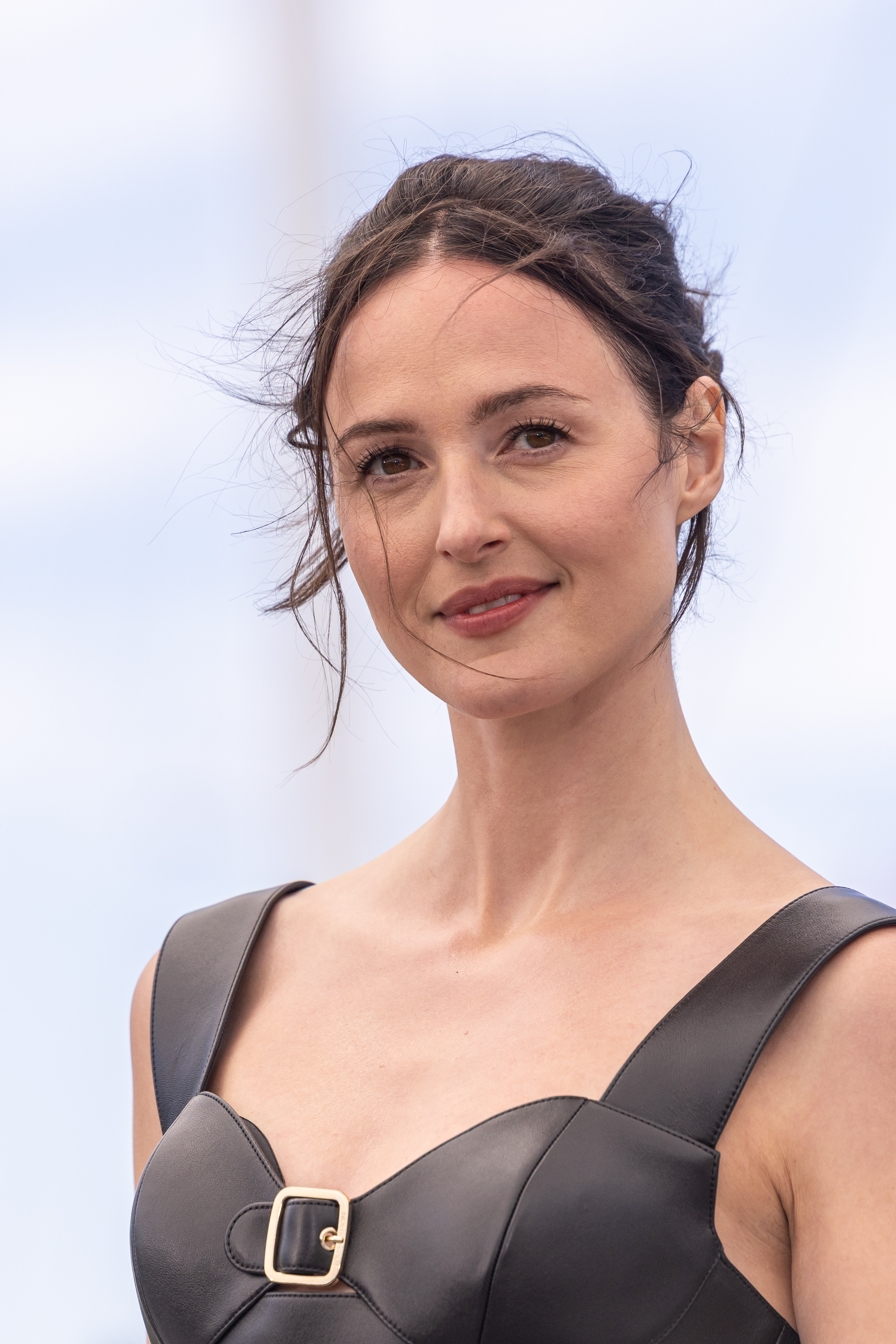
The performances of Chiwetel Ejiofor and Renate Reinsve were praised by critics.

Backrooms received generally positive reviews from critics. On the review aggregator website Rotten Tomatoes, 85% of 324 critics' reviews are positive, with an average rating of 7.4/10. The website's consensus reads: "A startlingly assured feature debut from director Kane Parsons, Backrooms bends the liminal spaces that have haunted the internet for years into a horror film that's as mesmerizing as it is terrifying." Metacritic, which uses a weighted average, assigned the film a score of 76 out of 100, based on 47 critics, indicating "generally favorable" reviews. Audiences polled by CinemaScore gave the film an average grade of "B−" on an A+ to F scale, while those surveyed by PostTrak gave it a 68% positive score, with 53% saying they would definitely recommend it.

Amy Nicholson for Los Angeles Times described the film as a feature expansion of Parsons's web series, praising its unsettling visual concept but thought it less a conventional horror film and more a surreal, dreamlike experience of a moving Salvador Dalí painting. She also highlighted the performances of the cast, including Chiwetel Ejiofor and Renate Reinsve. Dan Bayer of Next Best Picture praised Reinsve and Ejiofor for conveying emotion through subtle acting even when the script is sparse. He also said Parsons arrived "as a fully formed filmmaker", with exceptional control over imagery, pacing, and dread. Sonny Bunch of The Bulwark argued that while the movie can be overly explicit in its themes, its emotional honesty, visual creativity, and psychological depth make it "tremendously effective", "astute", and memorable.

Owen Gleiberman of Variety highlighted Parsons's skill at creating dread through mood, sound design, and eerie visuals rather than conventional jump scares. Gleiberman drew comparisons to Eraserhead (1977), The Shining (1980), and Skinamarink (2022), based on the film's dreamlike horror and use of empty spaces. Peter Bradshaw of The Guardian highlighted the film's oppressive atmosphere, striking production design, and unsettling yellow-lit visuals, comparing its themes and style to Japanese horror, Severance (2022–present), and The Rehearsal (2022–present). Angie Han from The Hollywood Reporter praised Backrooms as an unsettling and immersive expansion of the universe, highlighting Parsons's use of labyrinthine spaces, sterile fluorescent lighting, and a constant sense of disorientation to build tension.

Beatrice Loayza of The New York Times wrote that Will Soodik's script "cobbles together ideas about trauma and the mysterious workings of the unconscious, and sprinkles on some metaphors about gentrification as a repression of the past for good measure." Lex Briscuso of IGN wrote that the film was "a truly terrifying cinematic rabbit hole that takes its audience down a twisted and dread-filled path as cerebral in its horror as it is aesthetically pleasing in its design." Ryan Lattanzio of IndieWire says Parsons and production designer Danny Vermette "have a hell of a time conjuring spatial uncanniness with images we've never before seen on the big screen".

The Hollywood Reporter's Mia Galuppo and Aaron Couch described the box-office success of Parsons's Backrooms and Curry Barker's Obsession as evidence of the growing influence of YouTube-native filmmakers in the horror genre. They suggested that the films' strong appeal among Generation Z audiences could encourage studios to increasingly seek talent from digital platforms, favoring low-budget, creator-driven productions. Alex Werpin from The Hollywood Reporter reported that, following the success of Backrooms, Reddit is emerging as a destination for agents, executives and studios seeking new intellectual property, talent and story ideas from online communities. Studios believe that engaging with these communities can help build awareness, generate curiosity and create stronger connections with fans. Joseph Bernstein of The New York Times connected the film to Generation Z's "deep unease with life lived online", drawing parallels between the labyrinthine Backrooms and the COVID-19 lockdowns, recommendation algorithms, and generative AI.

=== Accolades ===
Award	Date of ceremony	Category	Recipient(s)	Result	Ref.
Astra Midseason Movie Awards	June 30, 2026	Best Picture	Backrooms	Nominated	
Astra Midseason Movie Awards	June 30, 2026	Best Director	Kane Parsons	Nominated	
Astra Midseason Movie Awards	June 30, 2026	Best Actor	Chiwetel Ejiofor	Nominated	
Astra Midseason Movie Awards	June 30, 2026	Best Supporting Actress	Renate Reinsve	Nominated	
Astra Midseason Movie Awards	June 30, 2026	Best Horror	Backrooms	Runner-up	
Celebration of Cinema and Television	November 16, 2026	Vanguard Award	Chiwetel Ejiofor	Honored	
Critics' Choice Super Awards	August 6, 2026	Best Horror Movie	Backrooms	Nominated	
Critics' Choice Super Awards	August 6, 2026	Best Actor in a Horror Movie	Chiwetel Ejiofor	Nominated	
Critics' Choice Super Awards	August 6, 2026	Best Actress in a Horror Movie	Renate Reinsve	Nominated	
Fangoria Chainsaw Awards	October 25, 2026	Best Wide Release	Backrooms	Nominated	
Fangoria Chainsaw Awards	October 25, 2026	Best First Feature	Backrooms	Won	
Fangoria Chainsaw Awards	October 25, 2026	Best Lead Performance	Chiwetel Ejiofor	Nominated	
Fangoria Chainsaw Awards	October 25, 2026	Best Cinematography	Jeremy Cox	Won	
Fangoria Chainsaw Awards	October 25, 2026	Best Score	Kane Parsons and Edo Van Breemen	Won	
Fangoria Chainsaw Awards	October 25, 2026	Best Creature FX	Amazing Ape Productions and Werner Pretorius	Nominated	
Gotham Independent Film Awards	November 30, 2026	Audience Award	Kane Parsons	Pending	
Hollywood Music in Media Awards	November 18, 2026	Best Original Score – Horror/Thriller Film	Edo Van Breemen and Kane Parsons	Nominated	

== Future ==
In May 2026, Parsons confirmed that he was not finished with Backrooms and that there were already things "in the works right now". He also mentioned that the YouTube web series would continue. In early June, Deadline Hollywood reported that Parsons was already searching for a screenwriting collaborator to work with on the sequel. Parsons denied shortly after that a screenwriter was being sought. He also expressed interest in developing a Backrooms television series. In September, it was reported that Parsons had signed with A24 to direct the sequel and that an announcement would be imminent.

== See also ==
- Analog horror
- List of fictional works featuring parallel universes
