= Backrooms (web series) =

Science fiction web series (2022–present)

- Title card of the first episode
- Genre: Analog horror; Found footage; Science fiction
- Created by: Kane Parsons (Note: Known online as "Kane Pixels")
- Inspired by: The Backrooms
- Written by: Kane Parsons
- Directed by: Kane Parsons
- Composer: Kane Parsons
- Country of origin: United States
- Original language: English
- No. of episodes: 25 (Note: Six out of the 25 episodes are either unlisted on Parsons's main YouTube channel or found on a different channel. These six are all either included in the series' official YouTube playlist or are discoverable in the descriptions of other episodes.)

Production
- Animator: Kane Parsons

Original release
- Network: YouTube
- Release: January 7, 2022 – present

Backrooms is an American science fiction analog horror web series created by Kane Parsons based on the "Backrooms" creepypasta. Presented largely as found footage, the series follows a fictional organization named the Async Research Institute, whose scientists explore an extradimensional space consisting of large, mostly vacant and interconnected indoor complexes.

The series consists of 25 episodes uploaded to YouTube, with the first episode of the series, "The Backrooms (Found Footage)", posted on January 7, 2022. The series went viral, receiving tens of millions of views and a positive critical reception. Backrooms has been credited with a surge in popularity of the Backrooms creepypasta. A film adaptation directed by Parsons and distributed by A24 was released on May 29, 2026.

== Premise ==
Async logo

Set primarily in the early 1990s, the series revolves around the Async Research Institute, a fictional MRI research institute that discovers and makes a portal to the Backrooms—in-universe designated as "the Complex" by Async—and attempts to study and document it.

Following this discovery, missing persons cases skyrocket as people are pulled into the Complex from locations outside Async's facility. Most installments are centered around various anomalies Async encounters inside the Complex, while the installments titled "Found Footage" are from the perspective of citizens finding their way into the Complex on their own. A recurring theme is how Async's experiments have blatant disregard for the safety of staff and civilians, even after it is discovered that it can bring negative effects to the expansion of the Complex.

== Episodes ==
No.	Title	Directed by	Written by	Length	Original release date
1	"Found Footage"	Kane Parsons	Kane Parsons	9:14	January 7, 2022
In 1991, while filming a short film, a cameraman phases into the ground, finding himself in "the Backrooms", an extradimensional realm of endless rooms and liminal spaces which is also known as "the Complex". After wandering around for a while, he finds a wall covered with graffiti. As he examines it, he hears a sound behind him and turns to see a creature (referred to as "the Lifeform" by Parsons) that begins to pursue him. The cameraman escapes to a lower floor, experiencing various architectural anomalies before being led back up. Shortly after, he is pursued yet again. He hides from the Lifeform in a narrow gap in the wall leading to a steep slope, at which point the creature charges at him, grabs him, and causes him to drop his camera down the chute, which then phases back into reality and falls from the sky in 1996.
2 (Note: Unlisted on Parsons's main YouTube channel)	"Mar11_90_ARCHIVE.tar"	Kane Parsons	Kane Parsons	2:49	January 8, 2022
An opened .tar archive displays images of the Complex and redacted personnel.
3	"The Third Test"	Kane Parsons	Kane Parsons	1:46	January 13, 2022
A synthesized voice narrates that on July 2, 1988, the Async Research Institute conducted the third test of their "Low-Proximity Magnetic Distortion System", and before that in April of that year, a press conference was held at which the vice-director of Async, Ivan Beck, stated that the goal of the project was to address the growing housing and storage crisis.
4	"First Contact"	Kane Parsons	Kane Parsons	1:58	January 17, 2022
On October 17, 1989, Async performs the sixth test of the Low-Proximity Magnetic Distortion System. The test results in the opening of a gateway into the Backrooms. Elsewhere, the 1989 Loma Prieta earthquake occurs.
5	"faultline.mov"	Kane Parsons	Kane Parsons	2:59	January 17, 2022
Real ABC News footage of the 1989 Loma Prieta earthquake accompanied by the song "Pipes" by Kane Parsons.
6	"Missing Persons"	Kane Parsons	Kane Parsons	2:37	January 28, 2022
Reported missing person cases begin to skyrocket shortly after the opening of the Threshold (the name given to the gateway created by Async in "First Contact"). While on a routine expedition, several Async employees discover a dead body sitting against a wall covered in a dark, mold-like growth.
7	"Informational Video"	Kane Parsons	Kane Parsons	8:01	February 12, 2022
On the fictional date of February 29, 1990, Async employee Peter Tench gets separated from his expedition group while investigating strange noises nearby. After seeing his group vanish in front of him, Peter begins desperately searching for them. While doing so, he finds a dark, small room at the end of a hallway featuring wallpaper of trees and a wall resembling a decal of a house, and another large room featuring railings and a large recessed shelf in the wall in front of him. He finds his way back to the threshold only to find an observation room that was absent when he initially entered. He accesses the room, sounding an alarm in the process.
8	"Autopsy Report"	Kane Parsons	Kane Parsons	2:37	February 23, 2022
An autopsy is conducted on the body found in "Missing Persons". The medical examiner determines that the growth is a malignant form of hay bacillus. The examiner asks Ivan Beck where the body came from. The scene then suddenly cuts to a TV that flashes through numerous images before settling on the Threshold, with a sunset overlaid. (Note: This view of a sunset reappears in "home_27647.mov".)
9	"Motion Detected"	Kane Parsons	Kane Parsons	4:07	March 11, 2022
In 1990, Async sets up motion-activated cameras in the Complex. A compilation video is made from all available recordings. The first clips are unremarkable, featuring employees passing between pillars, the Threshold barrier closing, and a microphone failure. The final recording catches a dark mass peering from behind a distant wall.
10	"Prototype"	Kane Parsons	Kane Parsons	1:33	March 28, 2022
In 1982, a prototype of the "Low-Proximity Magnetic Distortion System" is tested at the Oak Ridge National Laboratory.
11	"Pitfalls"	Kane Parsons	Kane Parsons	14:04	May 1, 2022
While on a routine expedition in the Complex, Async researchers discover a room (later referred to as "Room 14D") containing deep rectangular pits. Mark Blume offers to cross over to open the door on the other side. After crossing, he opens the door and urgently tells the cameraman, Marvin E. Leigh, to cross over and document what he sees. Marvin reluctantly begins crossing when he trips and falls into one of the pits. While examining his new surroundings, Marvin hears distant screams. He advances towards the source of the sound, leading him to a house at the end of a red-lit residential street that appears to be set at night. Entering the house, he discovers that the source of the sound is not a person but a Lifeform that begins pursuing him. Marvin manages to escape with the assistance of his colleagues.
12	"Report"	Kane Parsons	Kane Parsons	6:21	May 20, 2022
Higher-ups at Async review the footage recorded by Marvin in "Pitfalls". Startled by the presence of hostile life in the Complex, they seal off access to Division 14, which contains room 14D.
13	"9780415263573" (Note: This is the ISBN for the 1892 short story "The Yellow Wallpaper".)	Kane Parsons	Kane Parsons	0:34	May 20, 2022
Black and white highway surveillance footage shows a car disappearing into the road.
14	"Presentation"	Kane Parsons	Kane Parsons	8:26	June 25, 2022
Async proposes plans for the potential commercialization of the Complex. On May 8, 1990, a meeting with the head of the Department of Energy (DOE), James Watkins, is abruptly interrupted when a distressed Peter Tench, revealed to have traveled 2 months forward in time, finds his way back to the observation outpost. (Note: As documented from Peter's perspective at the end of "Informational Video".)
15 (Note: Uploaded to a different YouTube channel from Parsons's main channel)	"Simpsons"	Kane Parsons	Kane Parsons	1:08	June 25, 2022
A temporal anomaly is caught while recording a TV broadcast of The Simpsons, when the episode "Bart Gets Hit by a Car" (1991) is interrupted by a Spanish commercial for Dimacol (2000).
16	"Found Footage #2"	Kane Parsons	Kane Parsons	13:23	August 21, 2022
A woman is transported into the Backrooms after investigating an anomaly in her garage. In the Complex, she discovers uneven architecture, elongated furniture, and large open spaces in states of disrepair. Eventually, she stumbles upon a car that seemingly phased into the Complex before crashing into a wall. Following bloodstains, she is led to a room full of dark plant-like growth. A Lifeform then emerges from the growth and chases her. She is eventually cornered in a room before green cracks begin to glow in the walls around her. The footage then abruptly cuts, revealing it was being watched on a TV set.
17	"home_27647.mov"	Kane Parsons	Kane Parsons	3:26	August 22, 2022
A compilation of inconspicuous VHS recordings and pictures is shown (Note: One of the rooms shown has the same layout as a room in "Found Footage #2".) before attention is given to a painting in the background of one of the photos. (Note: This painting is also seen in the Backrooms in "Found Footage #2".)
18	"Reunion"	Kane Parsons	Kane Parsons	13:12	December 8, 2022
On May 25, 1990, Async reopens access to Division 14. After the area is deemed safe to enter, numerous researchers enter and begin covering the pits in room 14D. Meanwhile, three researchers, including Marvin and Mark, are sent out to assess the room leading to room 14C, which is far larger and mostly unlit. The three are then suddenly ambushed by a man whom Marvin recognizes as Peter Tench. Peter, holding the team at gunpoint, reveals that Async faked his death, lamenting that his family thinks he is dead. Mark requests armed assistance from the team in the other room before being shot by Peter.
19	"_recording014"	Kane Parsons	Kane Parsons	2:32	December 8, 2022
Over a phone call, a higher up at Async questions Ivan Beck about Peter Tench, who had recovered from the Threshold outpost following "Presentation".
20	"Overflow"	Kane Parsons	Kane Parsons	1:39	December 24, 2022
On August 2, 1972, a machine system experiences a power overload. A green glow gradually fills an office. Attention is drawn to a document clipped to a bulletin board that displays Ivan Beck's signature.
21	"Damage Control"	Kane Parsons	Kane Parsons	14:03	January 30, 2023
After shooting Mark Blume, Tench flees and exits the premises of the facility. The next day, Async holds a meeting to provide context for the events that occurred the day prior. It is confirmed that after Tench went missing in the Complex, Async faked his death to avoid suspicion. After he was found alive, they kept him in the facility while they worked to reintegrate him. However, Tench, in a declining mental state, snuck back into the Complex where he would be found by Mark's group. It is revealed that after escaping the facility grounds, Tench was found dead, seemingly from falling and bashing his head on a rock. The video ends with brief flashing images and a phone ringing in an empty room.
22	"Found Footage #3"	Kane Parsons	Kane Parsons	45:01	September 13, 2024
A man, Ravi, falls into the Backrooms after investigating a noise coming from his basement. Ravi navigates the labyrinthine network of rooms and halls until finding himself in a dark, disheveled room where an unknown creature begins to pursue him. Ravi runs, crossing a skywalk that overlooks a red-lit city before continuing further into The Complex. He uses a radio transmitter to call for help when, after investigating radio chatter, the song "Do You Like Air Conditioning?" by Kane Parsons starts to play. Ravi begins to run back to the radio transmitter when a humanoid figure darts towards him; Ravi barely escapes. Several hours later, Ravi discovers a house placed in the middle of a large room. Inside, he hears a man speaking on the other side of a wall. Both look for each other when they realize neither can see the other. The man reluctantly agrees to help Ravi and begins tearing down the wall when a loud, rushing noise enters and violently shakes the room, and the man is heard yelling. Everything then goes quiet, with Ravi losing contact with the man. An unknown amount of time later, a defeated Ravi talks to the dying camera, talking about the sky and memories about a past summer and his friends which he refers to as Gary and Linda.
23	"Lighting and Tile Survey"	Kane Parsons	Kane Parsons	8:43	October 2, 2024
On November 14, 1989, Async employees remove a ceiling tile and a fluorescent troffer light from the Complex, with several noting the apparent absence of an external power supply to the light. The following day, Dr. Julia Meisner reports the preliminary results of the analysis, the only notable finding being the non-standard proportions of both the tiles and the bulbs. Markings on the light components indicate that the electrical ballast was manufactured in 1975, the troffer was manufactured in 1973 in Reading, Pennsylvania, and the lightbulbs themselves were manufactured by Sylvania Electric Products in an unknown year.
24	"Static Dead End"	Kane Parsons	Kane Parsons	4:02	February 12, 2025
Following Tench's death, Marvin and George Levy debate the events; Marvin suspects that Peter was murdered, while George remains skeptical, persuading Marvin to take time off. Researchers return to Room 14D to document the room Mark found. George, who is now handling the camera, records stretched wallpaper, irregular floor depth, and furniture phased into the walls and flooring.
25	"Everything Must Go"	Kane Parsons	Kane Parsons	16:04	August 18, 2026 (Note: This episode was initially released theatrically on July 3, 2026, as bonus footage to the film Backrooms, before later releasing on YouTube on August 18, 2026)
On June 18, 1990, Async researchers study an area of the Complex known as the Kelowna Branch, where they find a room with a sequence of hanging signs repeating and phasing into the floor, with text reading "EVERYTHING MUST GO! ENTIRE STORE ON SALE". The next day, they measure and analyze the signs. One of the researchers suggests the idea of a fourth sign inside or beyond a wall. They cut open a portion of the wall twice and find the predicted fourth sign, alongside a dark, mostly empty area resembling a furniture store. (Note: Identified offscreen as Cap'n Clark's Ottoman Empire.) They explore until they come across a television displaying the text "无信号" and playing a distorted song featuring a piano. A tall, humanoid entity in a pirate costume (Note: Identified offscreen as Pirate Clark.) arrives and attacks the crew, with the cameraman (Note: Identified offscreen as Naren Warne.) fleeing the scene.

== Development and themes ==
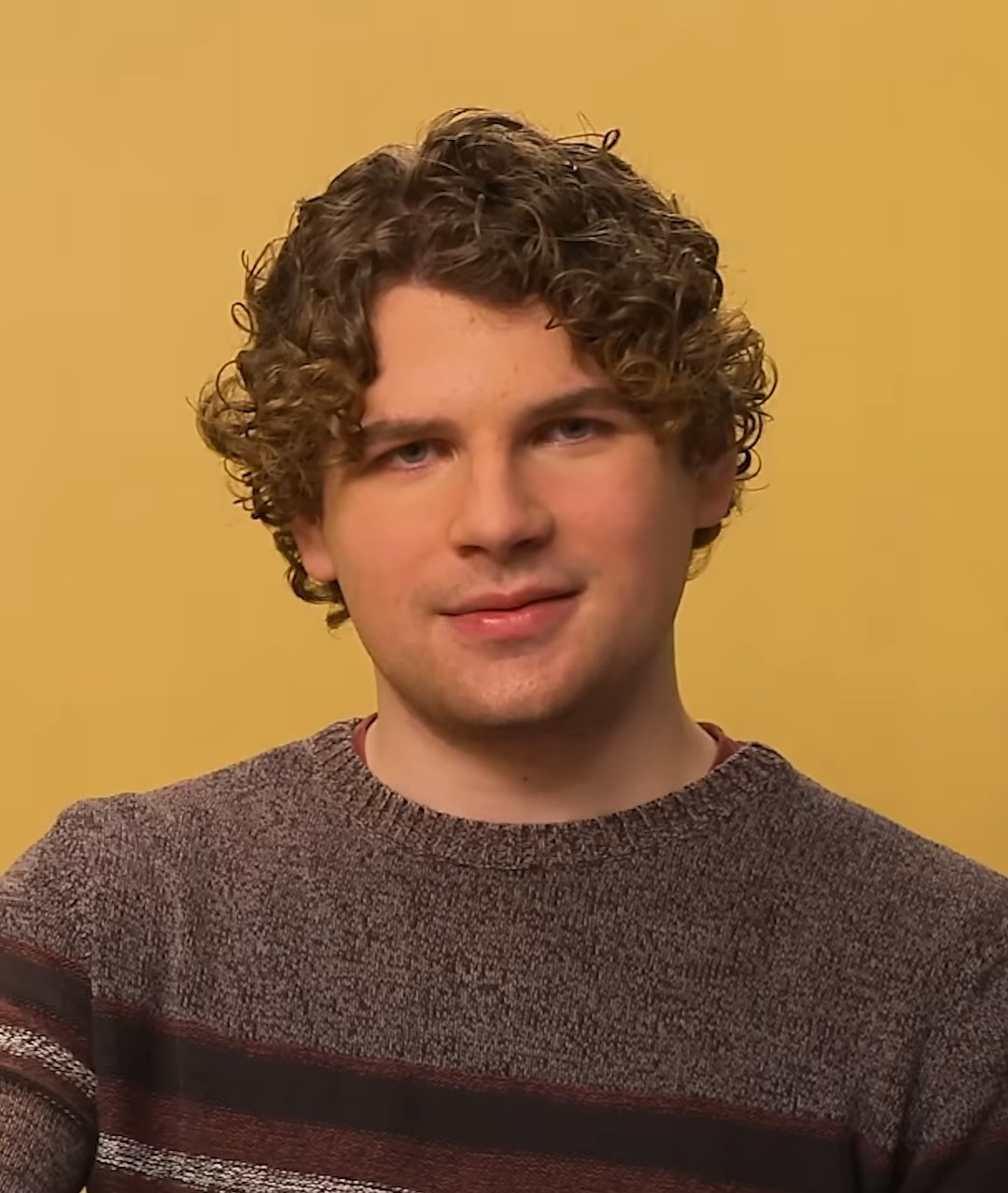
Kane Parsons in 2026

After making several Attack on Titan–themed videos, Parsons was looking for "new things to do". He was between projects and was inspired to create a found-footage-style animation of the Backrooms after rediscovering a render he had saved some time earlier. Parsons was vaguely aware of the Backrooms from the original image and caption he had seen on Instagram two years prior. However, he was not aware of the community behind it. In an interview, he stated:

"I came across the original image on my computer [...] and I just thought, huh, it would be interesting to see if I could go to my 3D software, Blender, and try to recreate a scene in this environment."

He used Blender to create a test animation of a chair in the Backrooms being thrown and hitting a wall. The shot was later used in the first video of the series. Parsons used both Adobe After Effects and Blender to create the first video; it took Parsons a month to complete the short.

Parsons expanded the concept into a series shortly after posting the first video. The series establishes plot points such as Async, a fictional research facility that discovers the Backrooms in the late 1980s and conducts active research in it throughout the series. Various character animations included in these later installments required the utilization of motion capture suits.

In an interview with ABC News in 2022, Parsons described the series as "a slow burn story focusing on both the politics of Async and the United States government, as well as the otherworldly, confusing functions of The Complex, or The Backrooms". Parsons credits the Internet aesthetic of liminal spaces as an influence for his series. In a 2022 interview with Vice, interviewer Andrew Lloyd wrote "For [Parsons], the Backrooms is a physical manifestation of a poorly remembered past, appealing to those with a cloudy recollection of the late 90s and early 2000s". And quoted Parsons as saying:

I mostly remember that time through little glimpses of memories here and there and then family photos [...] The flash is always on, the lighting is gross looking, there's yellow walls, the white balance is all off.

== Reception ==
The series has been considered a viral hit by multiple outlets, with the first video of the series receiving positive reviews from critics. Kotaku praised the series for exercising restraint in its horror and mystery. Writing for Bloody Disgusting, critic Luis H. C. interpreted the web series as being indirectly inspired by the novel House of Leaves by Mark Z. Danielewski, writing that the videos "perfectly capture the book's liminal atmosphere by adapting ideas that have permeated popular culture in the two decades since House of Leaves was published".

During the release of the first short, Parsons said he had "no idea" there had been an existing fan community behind the original Backrooms creepypasta, and recalled being surprised to see comments on his first video from people saying: "you're doing the Backrooms wrong. What is this?" or "there's supposed to be smilers on level one". (Note: "Smilers" is the name given to a malevolent creature in some iterations of the Backrooms. Similarly, a "level" is a concept created by Internet users describing different subsections of the Backrooms.) He said that this continued until eventually "people almost forgot about the old one" and his version had "sort of been adopted" by fans. For his work on the series, Parsons received a Creator Honor award from The Game Theorists during the 12th Streamy Awards. The series' first installment garnered 77 million views over the course of four years, with the series collectively garnering a total of over 197 million views.

== Film adaptation ==
After the major success of his web series, Parsons was eventually approached by several studios for a feature-length adaptation. In February 2023, A24, who successfully bid on the film, announced that work had begun on a film adaptation of the Backrooms based on Parsons's videos, with Parsons directing. Roberto Patino was initially set to write the screenplay, but was replaced by Will Soodik. James Wan and Michael Clear through Atomic Monster; Shawn Levy, Dan Cohen, and Dan Levine through 21 Laps Entertainment; and Peter Chernin through Chernin Entertainment were set to produce.

The film was written to be in direct continuity with the series. Chiwetel Ejiofor and Renate Reinsve star in the film, with principal photography having started in the summer of 2025, and concluding in August 2025. The film was released in the United States on May 29, 2026.

An extended version of the film, titled Backrooms: Everything Must Go Edition, was released on July 3, featuring an additional 15 minutes of footage. The bonus footage is available on Parsons's YouTube channel as episode 25, "Everything Must Go", although its upload was delayed beyond the week it was initially slated for due to the ongoing theatrical release of the extended version of the film.

== See also ==
- The Oldest View – Web series made by Kane Parsons
- Internet culture – Culture that has emerged from the use of computer networks
- Analog horror – Subgenre of horror fiction
- Liminal spaces
- List of creepypastas – List of Internet horror legends
