= Kane Parsons =

American YouTuber and filmmaker (born 2005)

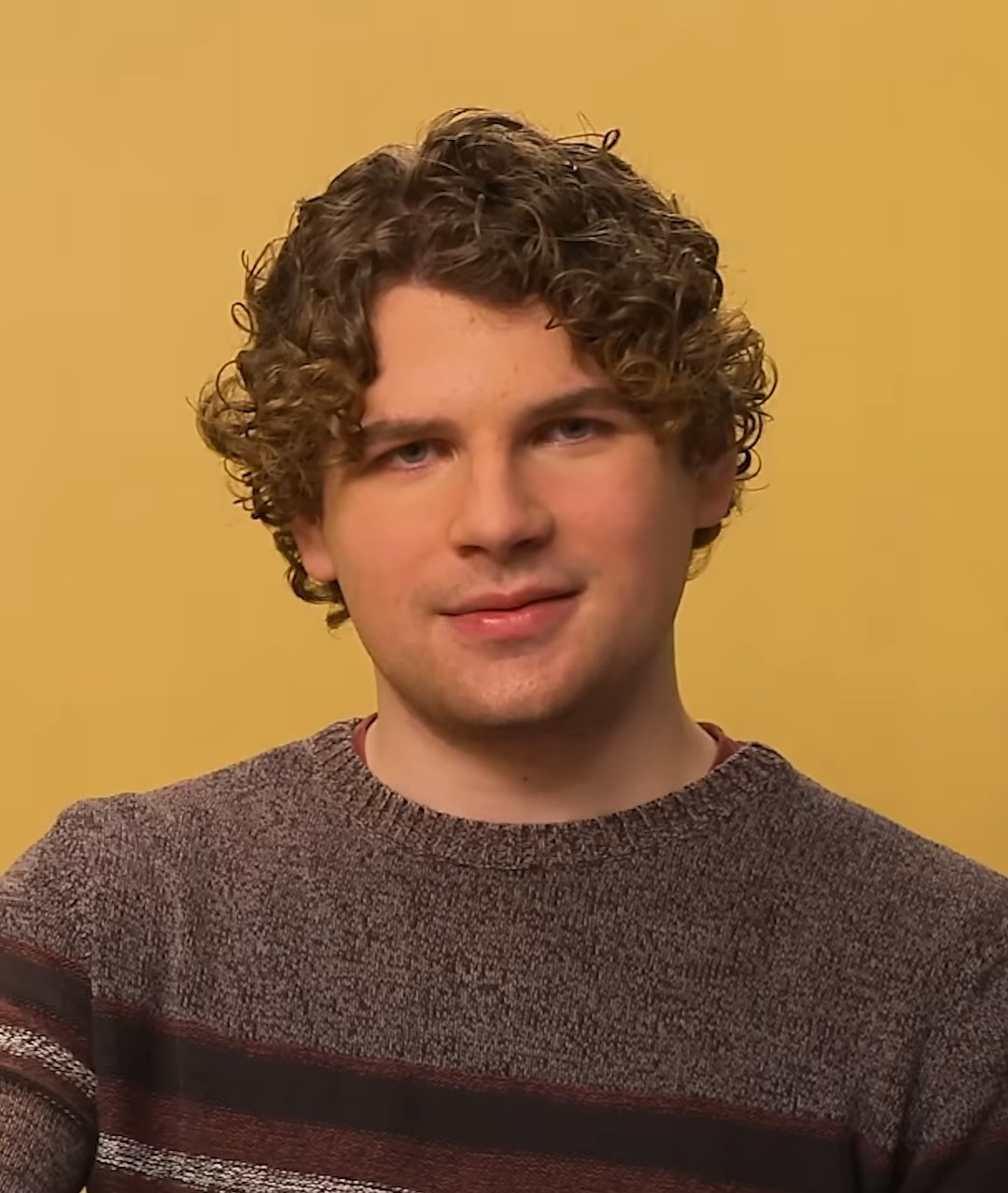
- Parsons in 2026
- Born: June 18, 2005 (age 21); Petaluma, California, U.S.
- Education: Novato High School
- Occupations: Composer; visual effects artist; YouTuber
- Years active: 2015–present

YouTube information
- Channel: Kane Pixels
- Genres: Acting; analog horror; horror shorts
- Subscribers: 3.69 million
- Views: 415 million
- Musical career
- Genres: Film score; ambient
- Instruments: Keyboards; synthesizers
- Kane Parsons's voice Parsons discussing his film Backrooms in an interview
- Last updated: October 29, 2026

Kane Parsons (born June 18, 2005), also known as Kane Pixels, is an American YouTuber, composer, filmmaker, and visual effects artist. He is known for his science fiction analog horror web series Backrooms, based on the internet horror fiction bearing the same name, and its film adaptation, which he directed himself.

Parsons was born in Petaluma, California and attended the Marin School of the Arts at Novato High School. Prior to the Backrooms series, he uploaded several other projects and videos on his YouTube channel Kane Pixels. He also occasionally posts music on his other channel Not Kane Pixels. On January 7, 2022, he uploaded a Backrooms short film titled The Backrooms (Found Footage), which became viral and spawned the web series. Backrooms received positive reviews and popularized the Backrooms.

He directed a film adaptation of his web series, Backrooms (2026), in collaboration with writer Will Soodik and producers of several film studios, released by A24 on May 29, 2026. It was a critical and commercial success; the film was well received especially for Parsons' direction, and at 20 years old, Parsons became the youngest director to have a film reach number one at both the domestic and global box offices, with Backrooms grossing over $402 million worldwide.

== Early life ==
Kane Parsons was born on June 18, 2005, and grew up in Petaluma, California. He has a younger brother. His father, Michael Parsons, is a visual effects artist who worked at Telltale Games until its closure in 2018 and his mother is a therapist; they divorced when he was seven years old. Parsons attended Marin School of the Arts at Novato High School.

== Career ==
=== 2020–2021: Early work ===
In 2021, Parsons adapted the anime and manga series Attack on Titan into animated short fan films, which present the series' events in the style of historical war photography. The shorts were praised for their horror elements and faithfulness to the original series.

=== 2022–present: Backrooms ===
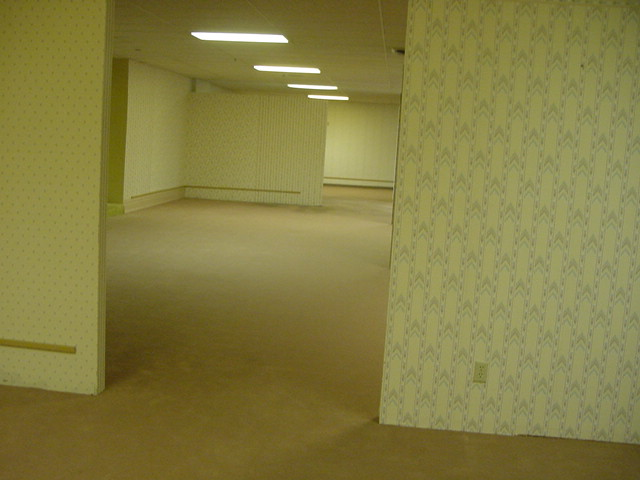
Parsons was inspired by the Backrooms creepypasta to create his own horror web series.

Parsons became interested in the Backrooms, a fictional extra-dimensional labyrinthine location of liminal spaces from creepypastas. Parsons was disappointed in the quality of related Backrooms content that was circulating online at the time, stating "there was definitely no real presence of high fidelity content being made". He used Blender to produce a short film inspired by the Backrooms, which he released on his YouTube channel on January 7, 2022, under the name The Backrooms (Found Footage). The video grew in popularity and Parsons produced further installments in what became an ongoing web series. The series incorporates the fictional Async Research Institute, an MRI manufacturer and research lab which Parsons had originally conceived as the focus of an unrelated project.

Within a month of the release of Found Footage, Parsons was contacted by numerous studios regarding a feature film adaptation. He was scouted by Lucas Ford, an assistant at 21 Laps Entertainment in charge of "flagging interesting material and creators". Parsons' parents joined him for his initial Zoom meetings with studios. In February 2023, the film adaptation was announced as a joint production between A24, Chernin Entertainment, Atomic Monster, and 21 Laps Entertainment, with Parsons directing in his feature directorial debut.

The film, titled Backrooms, starring Chiwetel Ejiofor and Renate Reinsve, was released in May 2026 to critical praise. Backrooms was also a commercial success, grossing $382 million worldwide. At 20 years old upon the film's release, Parsons became the youngest director to have a film open at number one at the North American box office, surpassing 27-year-old Josh Trank with Chronicle (2012). He also became the youngest director in A24's history. Media publications compared Parsons with Curry Barker—whose 2025 film Obsession played in theaters concurrently with Backrooms—and David F. Sandberg, as all three began directing short films released on YouTube before directing Hollywood feature films. The film had a special extended edition in theaters called Everything Must Go Edition with bonus footage. The bonus footage was also released on YouTube.

In May 2026, Parsons confirmed that the Backrooms web series would continue. In early June, Deadline Hollywood reported that Parsons was searching for a screenwriter to collaborate on a sequel to the film, though Parsons denied this. He expressed interest in developing a Backrooms television series.

In June 2026, Parsons expressed interest in directing the film adaptation of the video game Portal.

=== 2023–2024: The Oldest View ===
On March 18, 2023, Parsons began releasing his mystery thriller web series The Oldest View on YouTube. The series revolves around a YouTube vlogger named Wyatt discovering a staircase leading into an underground mall.

== Personal life ==
In early June 2026, shortly after the release of his film Backrooms, Parsons spoke out against the usage of generative artificial intelligence in filmmaking in an interview with The Australian, stating: "If I could snap my fingers and make generative AI disappear forever, I probably would. Creatively, I get no enjoyment from using those tools. It defeats the purpose entirely for me". He further added that even though AI could help make some VFX tasks less laborious, "right now it's difficult to discuss objectively because there's so much at stake and so many genuinely harmful consequences already happening".

== Filmography ==
=== Feature film ===
Year	Title	Distributor
2026	Backrooms	A24

=== Web series ===
Year	Title	Director	Writer	Composer	Actor	Ref.
2020–2021	Project 209	Yes				
2021	Attack on Titan (Historical Footage)	Yes	No	Yes	No	
2022–present	Backrooms	Yes			Cameo	
2023–present	The Oldest View	Yes				
2025	People Still Live Here	Yes			No	
