= Merlin's Shop of Mystical Wonders =

- VHS cover
- Directed by: Kenneth J. Berton
- Written by: Kenneth J. Berton
- Produced by: Kenneth J. Berton
- Starring: Ernest Borgnine; George Milan; Bunny Summers; John Terrence; Patricia Sansone; Mark Hurtado; Dr. Rick Hurtado; Nicholas Noyes
- Cinematography: Michael Gfelner; Tony Martin
- Music by: Ron Goldstein; Todd Hayen; Frank Macchia
- Distributed by: Monarch Video
- Release date: August 27, 1996
- Running time: 91 minutes
- Country: United States
- Language: English

Merlin's Shop of Mystical Wonders is a 1996 American fantasy horror film written, produced, and directed by Kenneth J. Berton.

The film stars Ernest Borgnine as a grandfather telling his grandson a story about the wizard Merlin opening up a store in the modern-day United States. He tells him two separate stories about Merlin and the store.

== Plot ==
Although the opening segment implies that Merlin's magical interventions in people's lives are intended to have a benign effect, in practice this proves to be far from the case.

The first story focuses on a married couple, Jonathan and Madeline Cooper. Jonathan is a respected, though obnoxious columnist, and Madeline is desperate for a baby, as she and Jonathan have been unable to conceive. The couple visit the store, where Jonathan berates Merlin and threatens to write a negative article in the newspaper that will cause his readers to avoid the store. Merlin loans Jonathan his spellbook as proof that he is actually the legendary wizard. Jonathan takes the book home and begins to toy with several of the spells. Jonathan becomes convinced of the book's authenticity when an unsuccessful spell to summon a spirit results in him having a vision of Satan and causing Jonathan to breathe fire. Jonathan quickly grows excited and becomes obsessed with the book's powers, but begins to dramatically age due to the rapid depletion of one's life force required to cast the spells. Jonathan attempts to transform his pet cat into a mystical servant, but it becomes demonic and proceeds to attack him. Using the spell from earlier, Jonathan breathes fire and burns the cat alive. By then, Jonathan has aged so severely that his hair is white and receded. Jonathan retrieves the book's rejuvenation spell and proceeds to create the required potion. He takes a sample of Madeline's blood and adds it to the mixture. Jonathan drinks the potion, but the spell backfires: Jonathan regresses into infancy. Madeline happily decides to raise her former husband as her own child.

In the second story, which bears a very close resemblance to Stephen King's short story "The Monkey", a thief steals a cymbal-banging monkey toy from Merlin's shop, and sells it to a novelty store, where it is quickly bought by a woman as a birthday present for her young son Michael. It soon appears that every time the monkey's cymbals are struck, a nearby living thing dies, including the family's pet goldfish and dog. Suspicious, the boy's father David consults a psychic friend, and she advises to throw the monkey away, which he does, but Michael finds it in the trash and returns it to the house. The monkey then attempts to cause the boy to be struck and killed by a passing car but he is saved when David manages to prevent the monkey's cymbals from coming together. Desperate, he takes the toy to a remote field to bury it, but a fierce storm and earthquake is summoned by the monkey in an attempt to stop him. David finishes burying the toy but is then injured by a falling tree, though his plan to be rid of the nightmarish object seems successful. Some time later, David's mother visits, bringing a present for her grandson Michael, which turns out to be the monkey, unharmed. The family attempts to flee as the monkey's cymbals go into motion, but before they can strike again, Merlin, who had been searching for the toy the entire time, suddenly appears and takes it back to his shop, promising to “deal with” the murderous object “later”.

== Cast ==
- Ernest Borgnine as the grandfather
- Mark Hurtado as the grandson

=== The First Story ===
- George Milan as Merlin
- Bunny Summers as Zurella
- John Terrence as Jonathan Cooper III
- Patricia Sansone as Madeline Cooper
- Nicholas Noyes as Nicholas
- Hillary Young as Nicholas' mother
- Julia Leigh Miller as antique store clerk
- Ben Sussman as Jake Cosgrove
- Randy Chandler as burglar
- Richelle Hurtado as baby

=== The Devil's Gift ===
- Bob Mendelsohn as David Andrews
- Struan Robertson as Michael Andrews
- Bruce Parry as Pete
- Vicki Saputo as Susan
- Madelon Phillips as Adrianne the Psychic
- J. Renee Gilbert as grandma
- Olwen Morgan as Elmira Johnson
- Barry Chandler as man in car
- Ángeles Olazábal as girl on bike

== Production ==
The second segment of the film is a recut version of The Devil's Gift, a 1984 film made by the same director. Large elements of the original film's storyline are missing, and segments with Merlin are added to show him pursuing the toy monkey. The original film's dark ending, in which the monkey kills the entire family, is replaced with Merlin arriving just in time to stop it.

== Legacy ==
=== Mystery Science Theater 3000 version ===
The film was featured in the last brand new Mystery Science Theater 3000's episode to air on the Sci-Fi Channel. Although the episode was number #1003, filmed third in the tenth season, its airing was delayed due to rights issues and actually aired after the show's second series finale.

The hosts and writers of the show used the sloppy editing on the second subplot, the disconnection between the two halves of the movie, and the wildly varying tone of the film as the basis for many of the jokes. The film's presentation as family friendly fantasy, juxtaposed against its dark narrative is also used as the basis of numerous jokes. The framing story of the Ernest Borgnine character telling these as stories to his grandson is also used for humor. A wraparound segment depicted host Mike (Michael J. Nelson) and his robot companions taking a look at an (invented) range of Ernest Borgnine children's books, whose benign titles and presentation belied the frightful nature of the stories therein, with the exception of one which has a macabre appearance but features an innocent story. Another host segment depicted Mike turning into a baby because of his disbelief in magic.

Writer Jim Vorel ranks the episode very highly, placing it #13 (Note: Ranking based on 197 episodes as of 2018.) in his exhaustive list of MST3K episodes for Paste. Vorel calls the movie "a completely jumbled, pieced-together film". He writes the first half is stronger because of the "professional critic” antagonist, while the entire film features "soap opera production values" and "unexpected brutality" in killing pets.

The MST3K version of Merlin's Shop of Mystical Wonders was included as part of the Mystery Science Theater 3000 Collection, Vol. 5 DVD collection, released by Rhino and re-released by Shout! Factory in May 16, 2017. The other episodes in the collection are Time Chasers (episode #821), The Touch of Satan (episode #908), and Boggy Creek II: And the Legend Continues (episode #1006).

=== RiffTrax ===
On December 29, 2020, RiffTrax released a VOD version featuring Mystery Science Theater 3000 alums Michael J. Nelson, Kevin Murphy, and Bill Corbett.

== See also ==
- Balloon Land – featured in the second segment
- The Ultraman – also featured in the second segment
- E.T. The Extra-Terrestrial – poster featured in the second segment
