= The Monkey (film) =

2025 film by Osgood Perkins

- Theatrical release poster
- Directed by: Osgood Perkins
- Written by: Osgood Perkins
- Based on: "The Monkey" by Stephen King
- Produced by: James Wan; Dave Caplan; Brian Kavanaugh-Jones; Chris Ferguson
- Starring: Theo James; Tatiana Maslany; Christian Convery; Colin O'Brien; Rohan Campbell; Sarah Levy; Adam Scott; Elijah Wood
- Cinematography: Nico Aguilar
- Edited by: Greg Ng; Graham Fortin
- Music by: Edo Van Breemen
- Production companies: C2; Atomic Monster; The Safran Company; Oddfellows; Range; Stars Collective
- Distributed by: Neon
- Release date: February 21, 2025
- Running time: 98 minutes
- Country: United States
- Language: English
- Budget: $10–11 million
- Box office: $68.9 million

The Monkey is a 2025 American supernatural comedy horror film written and directed by Osgood Perkins. Based on Stephen King's 1980 short story, the film stars Theo James in a dual role as twin brothers whose lives are turned upside down by a cursed toy monkey that causes random horrific deaths around them. Tatiana Maslany, Christian Convery, Colin O'Brien, Rohan Campbell, Sarah Levy, Adam Scott, and Elijah Wood also star.

The Monkey was theatrically released in the United States by Neon on February 21, 2025. The film received generally positive reviews from critics and has grossed $68.9 million worldwide against a budget of $10–11 million.

== Plot ==
In 1999, Captain Petey Shelburn attempts to return a wind-up drum-playing toy monkey at an antiques shop. Before he can do so, the monkey plays its drum, triggering a chain reaction that ends with a harpoon gun disemboweling the shop owner. Shortly afterwards, Petey disappears, leaving his wife Lois to raise their twin sons Hal and Bill. The twins later discover the monkey among their father's belongings and wind its key. That evening, while they are at a hibachi restaurant, their babysitter Annie is accidentally decapitated by the chef.

One day, Hal chooses to wind the monkey's key in the hopes it will kill Bill, by whom he is constantly bullied. Instead, Lois suffers an aneurysm and dies in front of Bill. Hal disposes of the monkey before he and Bill move to Casco, Maine, to live with their aunt Ida and uncle Chip. When the monkey mysteriously reappears at their new home, Bill winds its key, causing Chip to be trampled to death in a horse stampede. The twins seal the monkey in its box and throw it down a nearby well, hoping it will remain hidden.

Twenty-five years later, Hal, still paranoid and traumatized by his past, is estranged from his family, including his son Petey. His ex-wife, now remarried, plans to have her new husband adopt Petey, effectively cutting Hal out of Petey's life. After Ida dies in a freak accident, Bill contacts Hal for the first time in nine years, voicing his suspicion that the monkey has returned and insisting Hal drive to Ida's house to retrieve it. Hal believes it when he witnesses a woman exploding upon jumping into an electrified motel pool. While inspecting Ida's house, her real estate agent Barbara reveals to Hal that over the week following Ida's death, a series of bizarre fatal accidents have occurred in the town. A shotgun later falls out of a closet, killing Barbara.

Hal and Petey soon learn that Bill lives in town and has the monkey, having hired a local named Ricky to retrieve it. Bill, who knows about Hal's attempt to use the monkey to kill him, has been turning the monkey's key in retaliation, though the monkey has only been killing random people. Hal implores Bill to stop, fearing for his son's safety. As whoever turns the key is spared, Bill says he will stop if Petey takes over the task of perpetually turning the key in his stead; if Hal refuses, Bill threatens to keep winding the key until Hal is killed, no matter who dies in the process.

Ricky, obsessed with the monkey, forces Petey at gunpoint to retrieve it for him at Bill's house. Bill instructs Petey to wind the key, and a swarm of wasps kills Ricky. When Hal enters the house, Bill, furious at the sight of his brother still alive, attempts and fails to force the monkey to drum without winding the key in a desperate attempt to kill Hal. In retaliation, the monkey drums uncontrollably, triggering widespread death and destruction throughout the entire town. When Hal confronts Bill, the latter finally gives up, and the twins apologize to each other and reconcile over their shared grief for their mother. Shortly afterwards, the monkey beats its drum one last time, and Bill is suddenly decapitated by a bowling ball bearing Lois' name.

Driving through the now-devastated town, Hal and Petey accept their fates as the monkey's owners and vow to prevent the key from ever being wound again. A pale black-eyed man riding a horse—implied to represent the Pale Horseman—passes by and acknowledges them. Hal, determined to reconnect with his son, suggests they go dancing, as it is something Lois had loved, and Petey accepts.

== Cast ==
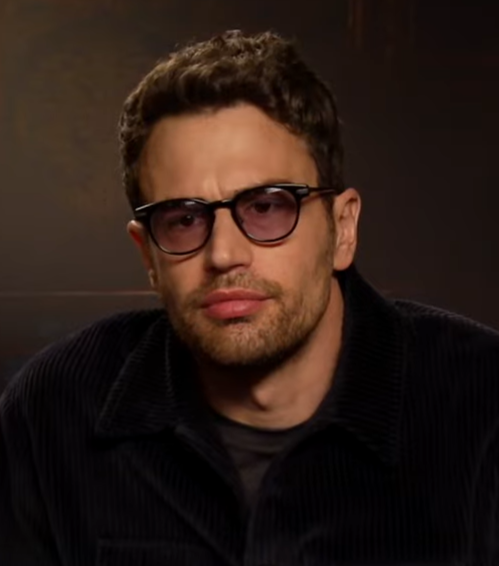
Theo James stars in the film with a dual role as twins Hal and Bill Shelburn.

- Theo James as identical twins Hal and Bill Shelburn
  - Christian Convery as young Hal and Bill
- Tatiana Maslany as Lois Shelburn, Hal and Bill's mother
- Colin O'Brien as Petey Shelburn, Hal's son
- Rohan Campbell as Ricky, a local thrasher
- Sarah Levy as Ida Zimmer, Hal and Bill's aunt
- Adam Scott as Captain Petey Shelburn, Hal's absent father
- Elijah Wood as Ted Hammerman, the new husband of Hal's ex-wife
- Osgood Perkins as Chip Zimmer, Lois' older brother and Hal and Bill's uncle
- Tess Degenstein as Barbara, a real estate agent
- Danica Dreyer as Annie Wilkes, Hal and Bill's babysitter
- Laura Mennell as Hal's ex-wife and Petey's mother
- Nicco Del Rio as Rookie Priest
- Kingston Chan as Lt. Pepper
- Janet Kidder as Ricky's mother

== Production ==
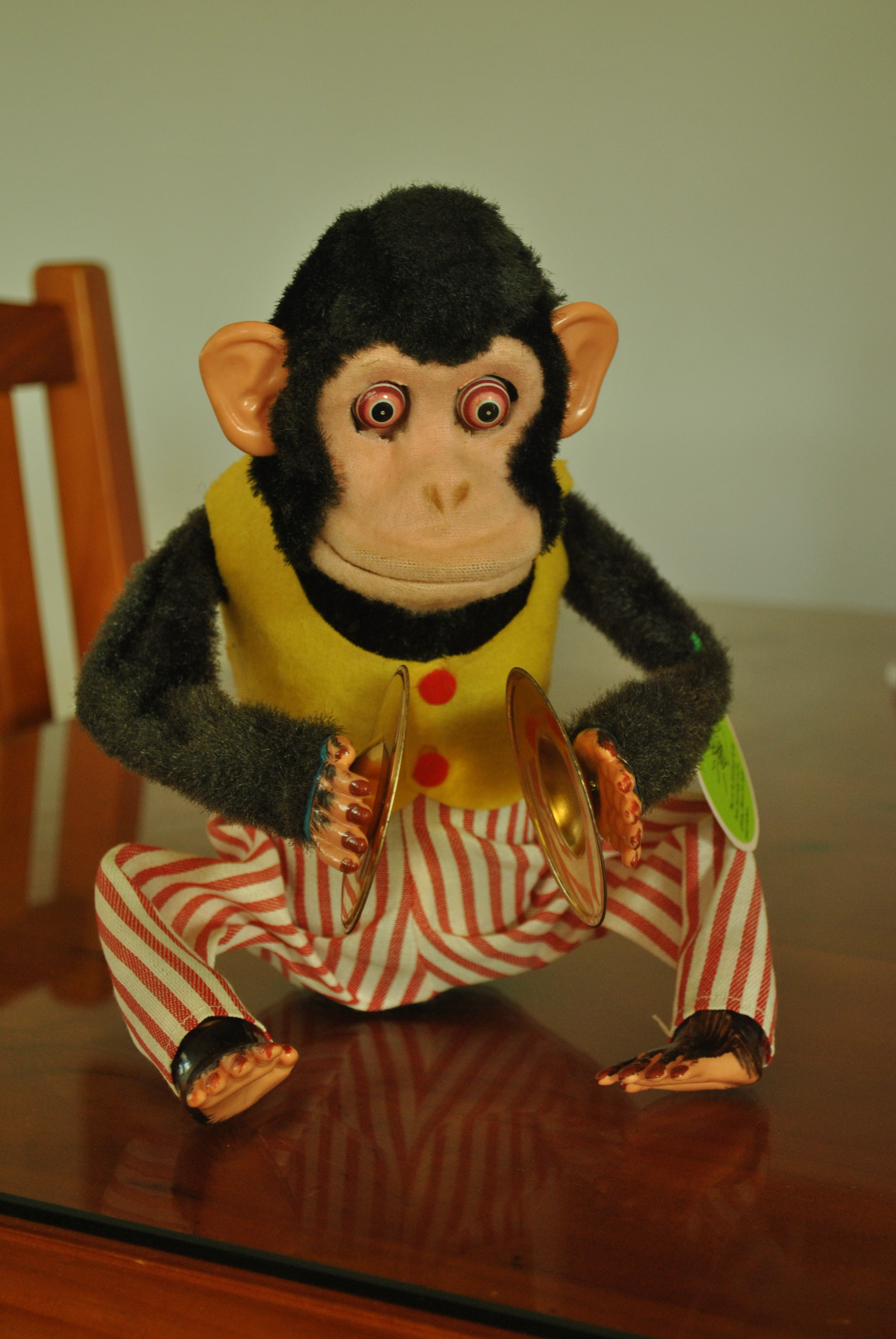
The original story featured a cymbal-banging monkey toy, but the cymbals were replaced with a drum for the film.

Director Frank Darabont originally held the film rights to Stephen King's short story "The Monkey" and planned to begin working on a film adaptation upon completing The Mist (2007), itself an adaptation of one of King's novellas. The project never materialized.

Going into the 2023 Cannes Film Market, financer Black Bear Pictures announced that a film adaptation of "The Monkey" was in development and up for sale to distributors. Osgood Perkins was hired to write and direct, and James Wan would produce under his Atomic Monster banner. Theo James was cast in the lead role. In March 2024, Tatiana Maslany, Elijah Wood, Christian Convery, Colin O'Brien, Rohan Campbell, and Sarah Levy were revealed to have joined the cast.

After facing delays due to the 2023 Hollywood labor disputes that lead to filming Keeper first, principal photography occurred in Vancouver from February 5 to March 22, 2024. The original story by Stephen King features a cymbal-banging monkey, but the film replaces the cymbals with a drum. According to Perkins, this change was made because the film's producer believed that The Walt Disney Company owned the rights to the cymbal-banging version of the toy on the basis of its appearance in Toy Story 3. Perkins preferred the drum over the cymbals as he felt that it enhanced the horror. In writing the film, Perkins chose to give the film comedic elements because he thought it was more fitting for a film about a toy, and he wanted to distinguish The Monkey from more serious horror films about possessed toys. Perkins further stated that the comedy in the film intentionally avoids subtlety and makes use of extreme gore to joke about the absurdity, pointlessness, and randomness of death. Perkins stated fully to Empire on his approach to the material:

I took liberties like a motherfucker. They [Atomic Monster] had a very serious script. Very serious. I felt it was too serious, and I told them: 'This doesn't work for me. The thing with this toy monkey is that the people around it all die in insane ways. So, I thought: Well, I'm an expert on that.' Both my parents died in insane, headline-making ways. I spent a lot of my life recovering from tragedy, feeling quite bad. It all seemed inherently unfair. You personalize the grief: 'Why is this happening to me?' But I'm older now and you realize this shit happens to everyone. Everyone dies. Sometimes in their sleep, sometimes in truly insane ways, like I experienced. But everyone dies. And I thought maybe the best way to approach that insane notion is with a smile.

== Marketing ==
The film's official trailer released on January 16, 2025, and amassed over 43 million views online within 24 hours. After 72 hours, it had over 100 million views; according to Neon, this made it "the most watched independent horror film trailer ever". In late January, Neon attempted to air a trailer for the film on four major television networks, and all four rejected the studio, citing the film's "excessive violence". Neon released screenshots of the email discussions with the networks, although identifying information was redacted.

As part of the film's marketing campaign, Neon opened an online application for churches to seek permission to screen the film alongside theaters. Additionally, Neon partnered with Bloody Disgusting to hold a giveaway for an exclusive resin sculpture of the titular monkey toy. Deadline Hollywood reported that the film's marketing cost was "around $10 million".

== Release ==
In May 2024, Neon won a bidding war between multiple U.S. distributors for domestic rights at the Marché du Film and set a theatrical release date for 2025. The film was released in the United States on February 21, 2025. The Monkey marks the second collaboration between Neon and Perkins after Longlegs (2024). Prior to its official February release, the film was screened early in January at Grauman's Egyptian Theatre as part of Beyond Fest. The film was later added onto the Hulu service on August 7, 2025 as part of Neon's output deal with the former.

== Reception ==
=== Box office ===
As of April 17, 2025, The Monkey has grossed $39.7 million in the United States and Canada, and $29.1 million in other territories, for a worldwide total of $68.9 million against a budget of $10–11 million.

In the United States and Canada, The Monkey was released alongside The Unbreakable Boy and was projected to gross around $17 million from 3,200 theaters in its opening weekend. The film made $5.9 million on its first day, including an estimated $1.9 million from early screenings. It debuted to $14 million, finishing second at the box office behind holdover Captain America: Brave New World. Men accounted for 58% of the audience during its opening, with those 25–35 years old comprising 35% and premium large format screens contributing 12%. In its second weekend, the film made $6.3 million, a 54% drop and above-average hold for horror entries. In its third, it fell 39% and made $3.9 million. The film dropped out of the box office top ten in its sixth weekend.

=== Critical response ===
On the review aggregator website Rotten Tomatoes, 77% of 294 critics' reviews are positive, with an average rating of 6.7/10. The website's consensus reads: "Cruelly clever with some unforgettably gory set pieces, The Monkey reaffirms director Osgood Perkins' horror bona fides while revealing he also has a surprising – albeit sick – sense of humor." Metacritic, which uses a weighted average, assigned the film a score of 62 out of 100, based on 48 critics, indicating "generally favorable" reviews. Audiences polled by CinemaScore gave the film an average grade of "C+" on an A+ to F scale, while those surveyed by PostTrak gave it an average 2.5 out of 5 stars, with 49% saying they would "definitely recommend" it.

Brian Tallerico of RogerEbert.com gave the film three out of four stars and wrote, "Perkins has always been a formally confident filmmaker, but The Monkey contains some of his most striking imagery, shot through with malice by Nico Aguilar, and perfectly assembled by editors Graham Fortin & Greg Ng (who also cut Longlegs)." Peter Travers of ABC News said the film "loses steam in its final section", but added, "King and Perkins are still a dream team of fright masters when it comes to revealing the psychological dread lurking under the macabre monkeyshines that keep us up nights." The Atlantic's David Sims wrote, "In the hands of another director, the tone could wobble too wildly. Perkins is a specialist in making childhood trauma feel grounded and relatable, however, and that holds true for the loopy scares of his latest movie."

Siddhant Adlakha from Inverse gave the film a less positive review, describing it as "tonally haphazard" and criticizing it for a "lack of dramatic coherence". He argued that the film's irony and snark undermine any intended commentary about parenthood or death, comparing it unfavorably to Deadpool. The i Paper's Christina Newland gave the film two out of five stars, writing, "For a movie that professes to be bizarre, shocking and violent – and which shares a director with Longlegs, the scariest horror film of last year – The Monkey is surprisingly lacking in any good ideas. In fact, it's the worst thing a horror film can be: boring."

King praised the film, describing it as "batshit insane".

=== Accolades ===
Award	Date of ceremony	Category	Recipient(s)	Result	Ref.
Golden Trailer Awards	May 29, 2025	Best Horror	Neon / Requiem (for "Furry Friend")	Nominated	
Golden Trailer Awards	May 29, 2025	Best Teaser	Neon / AV Squad (for "Announcement")	Nominated	
Golden Trailer Awards	May 29, 2025	Best Horror TV Spot (for a Feature Film)	Neon / Requiem (for "Shit")	Won	
Golden Trailer Awards	May 29, 2025	Best Independent TV Spot	Neon / Requiem (for "Shit")	Nominated	
Golden Trailer Awards	May 29, 2025	Best Digital – Horror/Thriller	Neon / AV Squad (for "Instruments")	Nominated	
Golden Trailer Awards	May 29, 2025	Best Horror/Thriller TrailerByte for a Feature Film	Black Bear / Ignition Creative London (for "Terrify")	Won	
Golden Trailer Awards	May 29, 2025	Best Horror Poster	Neon / GrandSon (for "Teaser Art")	Nominated	
Golden Trailer Awards	May 29, 2025	Best International Poster	Black Bear / Ignition Creative London	Won	
Saturn Awards	March 8, 2026	Best Horror Movie	The Monkey	Nominated	

== See also ==
- List of adaptations of works by Stephen King
