= Balloon Land =

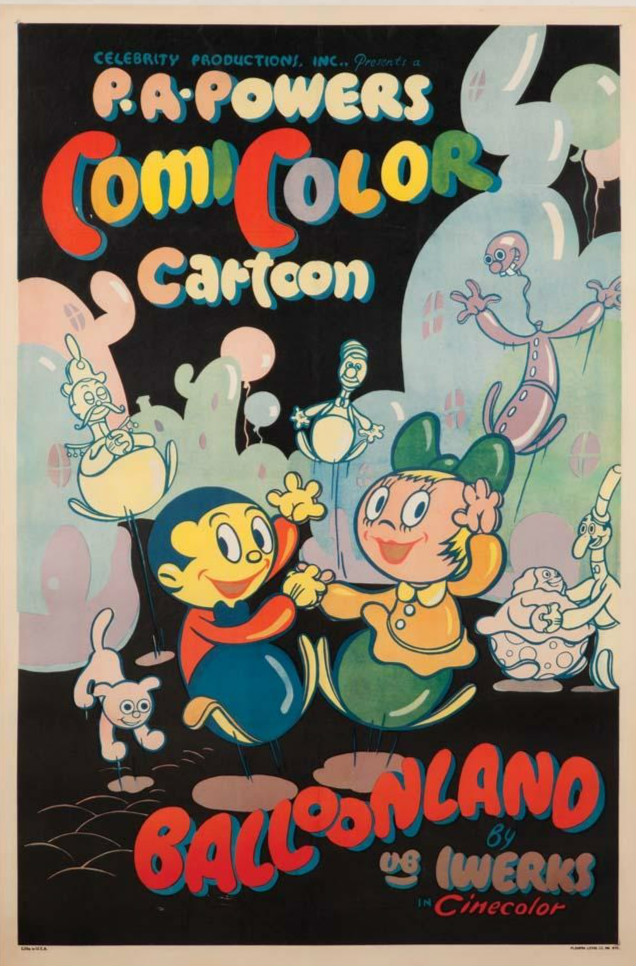
- Film poster
- Directed by: Ub Iwerks
- Produced by: Ub Iwerks
- Starring: Billy Bletcher as the Pincushion Man (uncredited); Leone LeDoux as the Balloon Alarm Babies (uncredited)
- Music by: Carl Stalling
- Color process: Cinecolor
- Distributed by: ComiColor Cartoons
- Release date: September 30, 1935
- Running time: 7 minutes
- Country: United States
- Language: English

The Cartoon

Balloon Land, also known as The Pincushion Man, is a 1935 animated short film produced by Ub Iwerks as part of the ComiColor Cartoons series. The cartoon is about a place called Balloon Land, whose residents (including caricatures of popular entertainment figures such as Laurel and Hardy and Charlie Chaplin) are made entirely out of balloons. The villain in the cartoon is the Pincushion Man, a character who walks around Balloon Land popping the inhabitants with pins.

== Plot ==
The cartoon starts with a short tour of Balloon Land featuring an entire population of balloon people and animals. People are shown working in and around the town. A machine that inflates the human-shaped balloons that make up the populace is being operated by a balloon man. The man uses a hose to inflate a boy and girl. The man warns them of the Pincushion Man, a non-balloon creature who lives in the woods and pops balloons. The boy immediately dismisses the warning saying that he is not afraid of the Pincushion Man, and enters the woods. The girl is afraid, but follows the boy anyway. After leaving through the gate at the edge of town, they walk through the dark forest. While looking around, a large gray and red tree scares them. They run away and crash into a brown and green tree. With the boy faking that he is not scared at all, the tree comes to life and tries to grab the girl, but the boy swipes it and they escape. Meanwhile, the Pincushion Man hides behind a balloon rock before popping it. He describes himself as the "Terror of Balloon Land" while popping flowers, rocks, and trees. The two kids, unaware of his proximity, continued to walk through the forest. The boy describes the Pincushion Man as fake. The Pincushion Man then spots the oblivious kids. He hides behind a green and red tree and scares the kids. While the kids huddle in fear, he grabs one of the needles and tries to poke the kids with it but misses. The Pincushion Man then chases the kids but runs into a small colorful tree which sends him flying backward and allows the kids to escape through the town gate into Balloon Land. In frustration, he bangs on the gate wanting to come into Balloon Land. The kids immediately run off, but a civilian that was standing right next to the gate hears the Pincushion Man and talks to him through the gate. The Pincushion Man tricks the civilian, who at first refused him entry, into opening the gate. After gaining entry, the Pincushion Man pops the civilian, mocking him for believing the Pincushion Man's lie.

Meanwhile, the kids already arrived downtown and witnessed the Pincushion Man's first kill. The kids immediately rush across the street to sound the alarm, which was a crib filled with four babies. As they were drinking milk, the kids pulled the bottles out of their mouths and started to cry as their mouths engulf the camera, sounding the alarm. The feared balloon people began looking around for danger and began scrambling around to find shelter. As the Pincushion Man arrives downtown, the Pincushion Man immediately tries to take the kids again. The kids tried merging inside the house but ends up taking off their plugs to fit inside the house. After attempting to chase the kids, the Pincushion Man witnessed a man running across the street but gets popped by the Pincushion Man's needle, marking its second death. He threw needles one by one in the streets and immediately pops some of them including a mouse and a caterpillar. While the Pincushion Man attempts to pop more people, the two kids quickly snuck out of the house and rushed to the mayor's office. The little girl tried to escape the boy's arm but can't let go. Rushing inside which sends the guards spinning around, the shocked guards watched the kids from the entrance inside and the kids met the mayor in fear. After the boy immediately lets go of the girl's hand which sends her crashing into the desk, they told the mayor that they saw the Pincushion Man down the street. With the guard yapping "HOLY SMOKES!", an out-of-tune bugle was blown by one of the soldiers. This forced an entire army of Balloon Soldiers to be made and sent downtown. Meanwhile, the Pincushion Man threw some more needles after witnessing the army, popping a few soldiers. Preparing to launch gum bullets at the Pincushion Man, the leader ducks for cover, and the first few gum bullets and golf balls hit the perfect target at the Pincushion Man. War was declared on the Pincushion Man as he tries to take precautions seriously. Shortly after managing to get the gum off of his hands, he was hit with more gum and golf balls, sending him flying forwardly. After getting hit by more gum, he was covered in a big ball of gum, which sends him rolling out of town and into a tree. He managed to pop his last set of flowers while rolling. While trying to survive by holding onto grass, another big ball of gum with a perfect target hits the Pincushion Man and sends him falling out of Earth. With the day saved, Balloon Land was back to normal and the two kids were seen standing on a side of the street, kissing each other as the short ends.

== Notable appearances ==
- Several scenes from "Balloon Land" are shown during the film The Devil's Gift, which was later re-edited into another film Merlin's Shop of Mystical Wonders.
- A portion of it was featured in the 1981 HBO special The Pee-wee Herman Show and shown on an episode of Pee-Wee's Playhouse.
- The cartoon is also featured in the live revival of Pee-wee's 2010 stage show at Los Angeles' Club Nokia theater. It is introduced during the first act break by the King of Cartoons.
- Parts of "Balloon Land" are shown in two Shining Time Station music videos: "What Am I Afraid Of?" from the episode "Scare Dares", and "Bad Guy" from the episode "Bully for Mr. Conductor".
- Parts of the cartoon are also heard/seen throughout the 2022 film Skinamarink.

== Image gallery ==
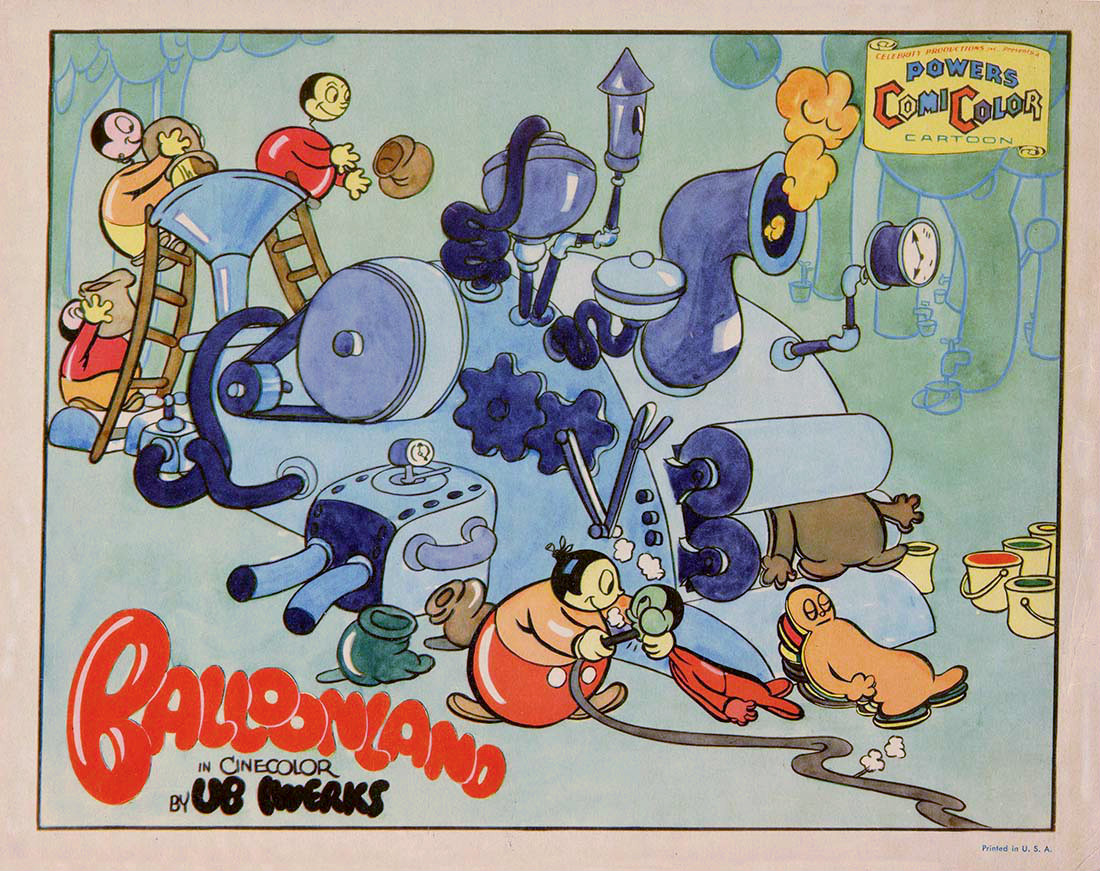
Lobby card

== See also ==
- ComiColor Cartoons
- Ub Iwerks
