= The Devil's Gift =

- Directed by: Kenneth J. Berton
- Written by: Kenneth J. Berton; José Vergelin; Hayden O'Harra
- Produced by: Kenneth J. Berton; José Vergelin
- Starring: Bob Mendelsohn; Struan Robertson
- Cinematography: Karil Daniels; Caris Palm
- Edited by: Kenneth J. Berton; José Vergelin
- Music by: Todd Hayen
- Distributed by: Zenith International Pictures
- Release date: 1984
- Running time: 112 minutes
- Country: United States
- Language: English

The Devil's Gift is a 1984 horror film directed by Kenneth J. Berton. The film's plot is noted for the role played by a Ouija board and for its similarities to the 1980 Stephen King short story "The Monkey". An abridged version of The Devil's Gift was included in Kenneth J. Berton's 1996 film Merlin's Shop of Mystical Wonders.

== Plot ==
The story opens with Elmira Johnson, an elderly woman who uses a Ouija board to communicate with spirits. One spirit becomes angry, manifesting as a cymbal-banging monkey toy. The toy's eyes glow red, and its cymbals cause lightning to strike Elmira's house, killing her.

Later, David Andrews, a single father, celebrates his son Michael's ninth birthday. Michael receives the monkey toy as a gift from David's girlfriend, Susan, who bought it at an antiques store. The monkey begins to act on its own, and strange occurrences follow, including the death of household plants, a fire that kills the family dog, and nightmares that plague David.

David consults Adrienne, a fortune teller, who warns that demons often possess innocuous objects. Realizing the monkey is linked to the events, David investigates its origins. He learns from an antiques store clerk that the toy was found unharmed in the ruins of Elmira Johnson's house. Despite his findings, the disturbances escalate. Susan becomes possessed and tries to drown Michael, leading David to expel her from the house.

Adrienne provides David with a protective necklace and advises him to dispose of the monkey. However, Michael retrieves the toy from the garbage, and further accidents occur. David attempts to bury the monkey, but it inexplicably returns. As the family tries to escape, the monkey activates its cymbals. The story ends ambiguously with a chime and an explosion, implying the family's demise.

== See also ==
- Killer toy
