= Black Bear Pictures =

American media company

Black Bear Pictures, LLC
- Logo used since 2023

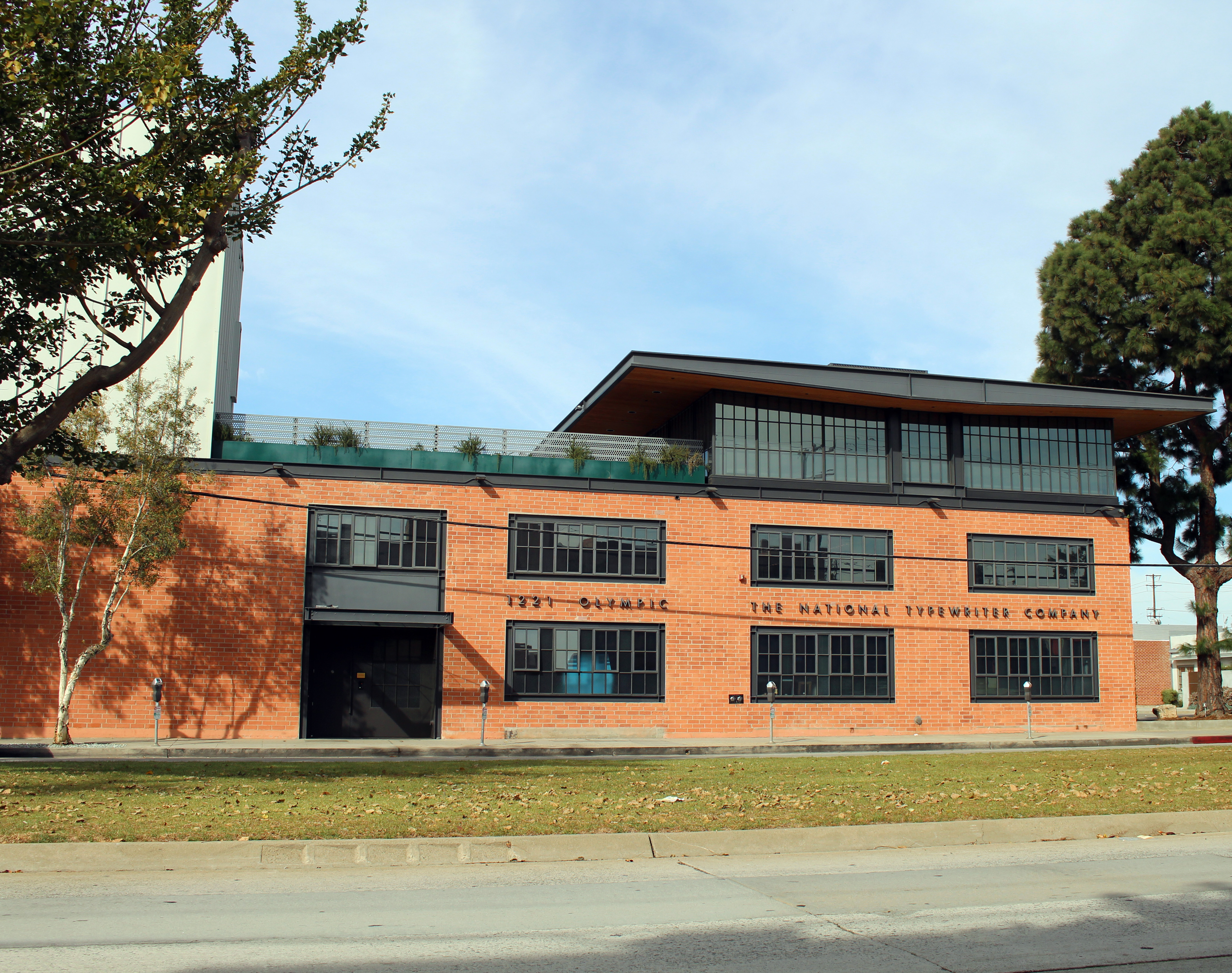
- Black Bear's current headquarters in Santa Monica
- Trade name: Black Bear
- Type: Private
- Founded: 2011; 15 years ago
- Founder: Teddy Schwarzman
- Headquarters: Santa Monica, California, United States
- Number of employees: 11-50
- Divisions: Black Bear Television; Black Bear International; Black Bear UK
- Subsidiaries: Double Agent (50%); Elevation Pictures
- Website: blackbearpictures.com

Black Bear Pictures, LLC is an American independent media company that develops, produces, distributes and finances original film and television content. The company’s slate blends premium drama with commercial action and genre titles. Past films include Train Dreams, Sing Sing, Nyad, A Working Man, and The Imitation Game. Black Bear is based in Santa Monica, California, with additional offices in London.

Since its 2011 launch, Black Bear's slate has been nominated for 22 Academy Awards and 13 BAFTAs, and premiered at film festivals including Cannes, Sundance, Venice, Telluride, Toronto, New York, and London.

== History ==
Black Bear was founded in 2011 by Teddy Schwarzman, a film producer and former corporate lawyer who left Cinetic Media to establish his own production company.

In 2013, Black Bear financed the launch of Elevation Pictures, an independent film and TV distribution company in Canada, with the two companies entering an output deal. Black Bear later fully acquired Elevation, which now operates as a subsidiary of Black Bear. Elevation has distributed films including Anora, Anatomy of a Fall, The Zone of Interest, and Everything Everywhere All at Once.

In 2022, Black Bear launched an international sales division (Black Bear International) led by John Friedberg. In addition to its own productions, Black Bear has sold third-party titles including Longlegs, The Monkey, and Afterburn. Also in 2022, Black Bear partnered with New Regency to launch a documentary production unit entitled Double Agent to produce & finance premium documentaries, with Dana O’Keefe appointed president.

In 2023, Black Bear was launched as a primary distributor (Black Bear UK) in the United Kingdom, starting with Dumb Money (2023). In 2025, they launched a U.S distribution division led by Benjamin Kramer to release between ten and twelve films per year. Christy was the division's first release, followed by Shelter.

In November 2025, it was reported that Bad Robot Productions sold their Santa Monica property housing for US$31 million to serve as Black Bear's new headquarters.

== Films ==
=== Production company ===
- At Any Price (2012)
- Broken City (2013)
- A.C.O.D. (2013)
- All Is Lost (2013)
- The Imitation Game (2014)
- Knock Knock (2016)
- Barry (2016)
- Gold (2016)
- Suburbicon (2017)
- The Last Word (2017)
- Mudbound (2017)
- The Happytime Murders (2018)
- Ben Is Back (2018)
- Light of My Life (2019)
- The Operative (2019)
- Our Friend (2019)
- I Carry You With Me (2020)
- The Rental (2020)
- I Care a Lot (2020)
- Little Fish (2020)
- Memory (2022)
- Somebody I Used to Know (2023)
- The Marsh King's Daughter (2023)
- Dumb Money (2023)
- Nyad (2023)
- Sing Sing (2023)
- The Ministry of Ungentlemanly Warfare (2024)
- Immaculate (2024)
- Relay (2024)
- Train Dreams (2025)
- The Monkey (2025)
- A Working Man (2025)
- I Want Your Sex (2026)
- Anxious People (2027)
- Kockroach (TBA)
- Useful Idiots (TBA)
- The Nest (TBA)

=== U.S. distributor ===
- Christy (2025) - also produced
- Shelter (2026) - also produced
- In the Grey (2026) - also produced
- Tuner (2026) - also produced
- The Rivals of Amziah King (2026) - also produced
- Spa Weekend (2026) - also produced
- Wicker (2026)
- Wife & Dog (2027) - also produced
- Jason Statham Stole My Bike (2027) - also produced
- Viva La Madness (2028) - also produced
- Atmosphere (TBA) - also produced
- Honeymoon / Funeral (TBA)
- They Know (TBA)

=== U.K. distributor ===
- Dumb Money (2023)
- Ferrari (2023; with Sky Cinema)
- The Son (2023; with STXfilms)
- Conclave (2024)
- Goodrich (2024)
- Immaculate (2024)
- A Killer's Memory (2024)
- Longlegs (2024)
- Origin (2024)
- The Salt Path (2024)
- Sing Sing (2023)
- Afterburn (2025)
- Christy (2025)
- Keeper (2025)
- The Monkey (2025)
- Relay (2025)
- Shell (2025)
- Train Dreams (2025; with Netflix)
- Whistle (2026)
- Hokum (2026)
- Shelter (2026)
- Tuner (2026)
- The Invite (2026)
- Spa Weekend (2026)
- I Want Your Sex (2026)
- Wildwood (2026)
- Wicker (2026)
- Pendulum (2027)
- Wife & Dog (2027)
- Atmosphere (TBA)
- Sacrifice (TBA)

=== International sales ===
- The Marsh King's Daughter (2023)
- Dumb Money (2023)
- Sing Sing (2023)
- Ferrari (2023)
- The Ministry of Ungentlemanly Warfare (2024)
- Immaculate (2024)
- Longlegs (2024)
- Goodrich (2024)
- On Swift Horses (2024)
- Relay (2024)
- Shell (2024)
- The Monkey (2025)
- The Rivals of Amziah King (2025)
- A Working Man (2025)
- She Rides Shotgun (2025)
- Motor City (2025)
- Tuner (2025)
- Afterburn (2025)
- Whistle (2025)
- Christy (2025)
- Greenland 2: Migration (2026)
- I Want Your Sex (2026)
- Wicker (2026)
- Shelter (2026)
- In the Grey (2026)
- Spa Weekend (2026)
- Pendulum (2027)
- The Beekeeper 2 (2027)
- Wife & Dog (2027)
- Jason Statham Stole My Bike (2027)
- 77 Blackout (TBA)
- Bad Boy (TBA)
- Anxious People (TBA)
- Kockroach (TBA)
- Famous (TBA)
- Hammer Down (TBA)
- Mister (TBA)
- Musk (TBA)
- Shutout (TBA)
- Ibelin (TBA)
- Useful Idiots (TBA)
- Viva La Madness (TBA)
- John Doe (TBA)
