= Lucy Boynton =

British actress (born 1994)

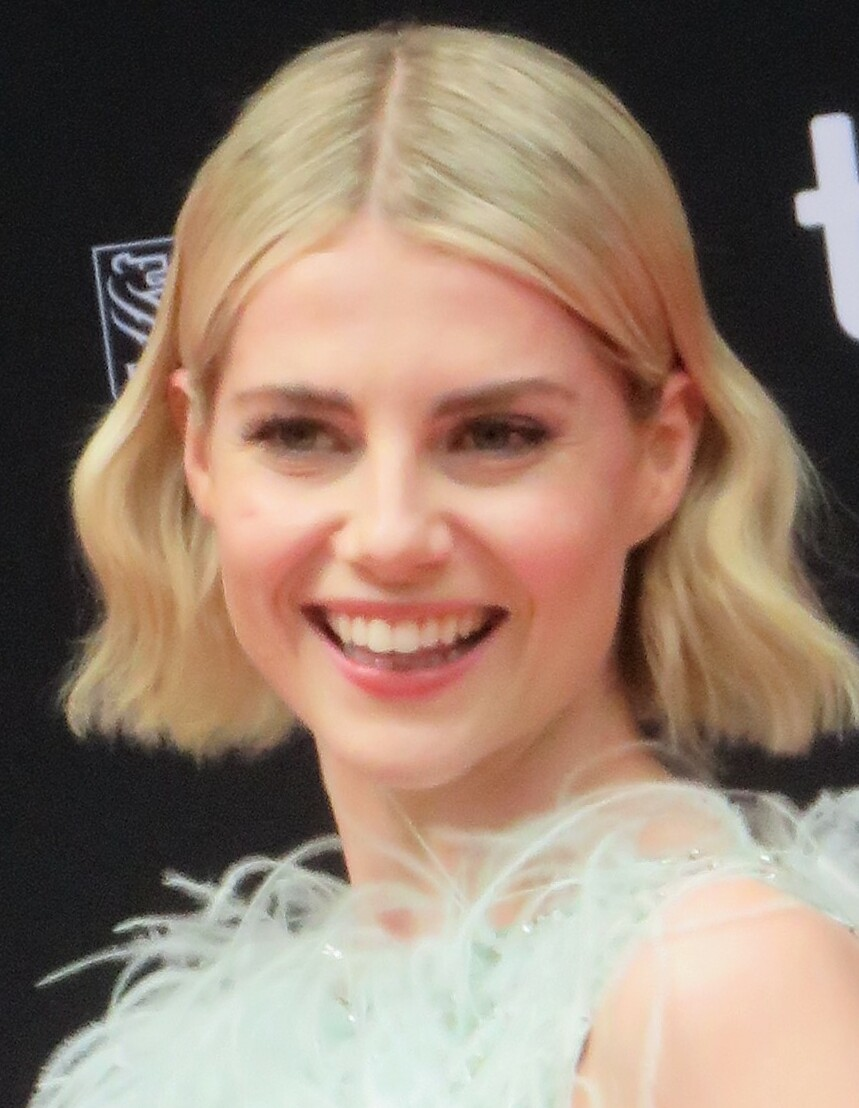
- Boynton in 2022
- Born: 17 January 1994 (age 32); New York City, U.S.
- Citizenship: United Kingdom; United States
- Occupation: Actress
- Years active: 2006–present
- Partners: Rami Malek (2017–2023); Murdo Mitchell (2024–present)
- Father: Graham Boynton

Lucy Boynton (born 17 January 1994) is a British actress. Born in New York City and raised in London, she made her professional debut as the young Beatrix Potter in Miss Potter (2006).

She appeared in television productions Ballet Shoes (2007), Sense and Sensibility (2008) and Mo (2010), making guest appearances on Lewis, Borgia, Endeavour, and Law & Order: UK. Boynton portrayed writer Angelica Garnett on Life in Squares, which aired on BBC. She appeared as an isolated popular girl in The Blackcoat's Daughter (2015) and starred as a bold aspiring model in Sing Street (2016). She also appeared in horror films I Am the Pretty Thing That Lives in the House (2016) and Don't Knock Twice (2016).

Boynton played Countess Andrenyi in Murder on the Orient Express (2017), which was a commercial success. Boynton portrayed an addict in Netflix's Gypsy (2017) and the daughter of a cult leader in Apostle (2018). Boynton gained recognition for starring as Mary Austin in the biopic Bohemian Rhapsody (2018). She appeared in HBO Max's Locked Down (2021). Boynton appeared as the privileged antagonist Astrid Sloan in the Netflix series The Politician, appeared in the second season of Modern Love, and starred in ITV's The Ipcress File (2022).

== Early life and education ==
Boynton was born in New York on 17 January 1994 to English parents, journalists Graham Boynton and Adrianne Pielou. The younger of two daughters, Boynton was initially raised in New York until the age of four when her family returned to Britain; thereafter, she was raised in southeast London. She retains dual citizenship of the United Kingdom and the United States. Boynton realized she wanted to act when she was ten, after a drama teacher taught her that "acting was not playing pretend; it was understanding the human mind and why people function as they do." She attended the private Blackheath High School, followed by James Allen's Girls' School in Dulwich.

== Career ==
=== 2006–2014: Early roles ===
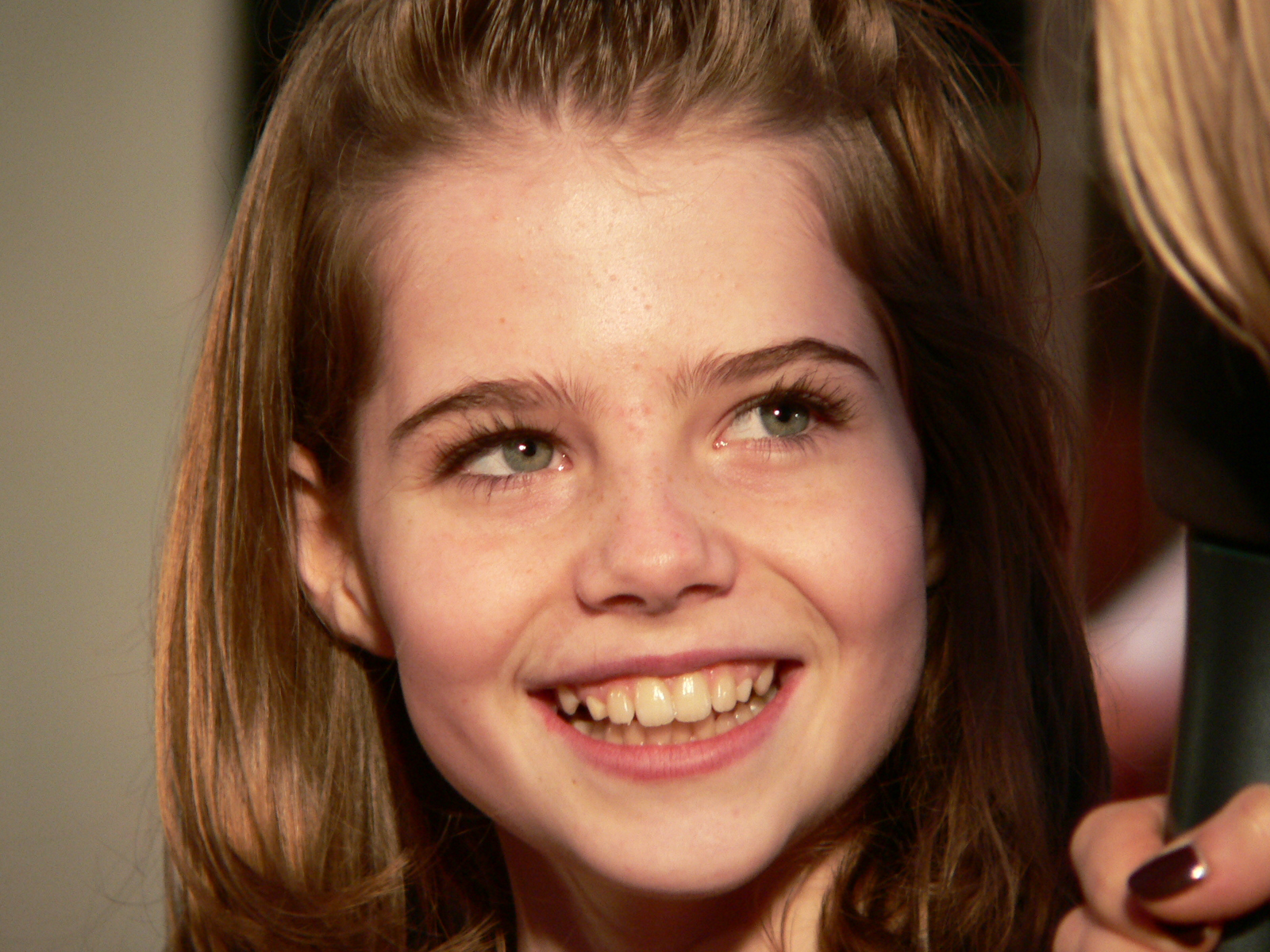
Boynton at the Miss Potter premiere in 2006

Boynton made her professional debut at age twelve as young Beatrix Potter in the biographical film Miss Potter (2006). She was asked to audition after being spotted by a casting director sitting in on her drama class. Additional scenes were written for her character after a test screening responded positively to her role. Boynton wore corsets and padded clothing to portray a younger Potter. Boynton stated that the first day of filming was "the best day of [her] life". In 2007, she was nominated for the Young Artist Award for Best Supporting Actress, for Miss Potter. Boynton starred as Posy Fossil in the BBC film Ballet Shoes (2007). A body double was used in some scenes to display her character's "remarkable dancing skill". The film was praised by critics.

Boynton portrayed Margaret Dashwood in the 2008 television adaptation of Jane Austen's novel Sense and Sensibility. The miniseries premiered to high viewership and positive reviews. Boynton has described experiencing a "difficult period" from ages 16 to 17 for being "too old for young roles, but too young to play the leading lady." She played Mo Mowlam's stepdaughter in television film Mo (2010). In 2011, She appeared in an episode of the ITV drama Lewis. In 2013, she starred in Saint Raymond's music video for the lead single from his debut extended play, "Fall At Your Feet". Boynton appeared in period drama Copperhead (2013) based on the novel of the same name by Harold Frederic. In 2014, she guest-starred in the television series Borgia, Endeavour, and Law & Order: UK. She played Angelica Garnett, a member of the Bloomsbury Group, in the BBC miniseries Life in Squares, which aired in 2015. To prepare for the part, she read Garnett's memoir, Deceived with Kindness, in which most of her scenes were detailed, which she described as "a dream for any actor". The series was reviewed positively.

=== 2015–2020: Film work and recognition ===
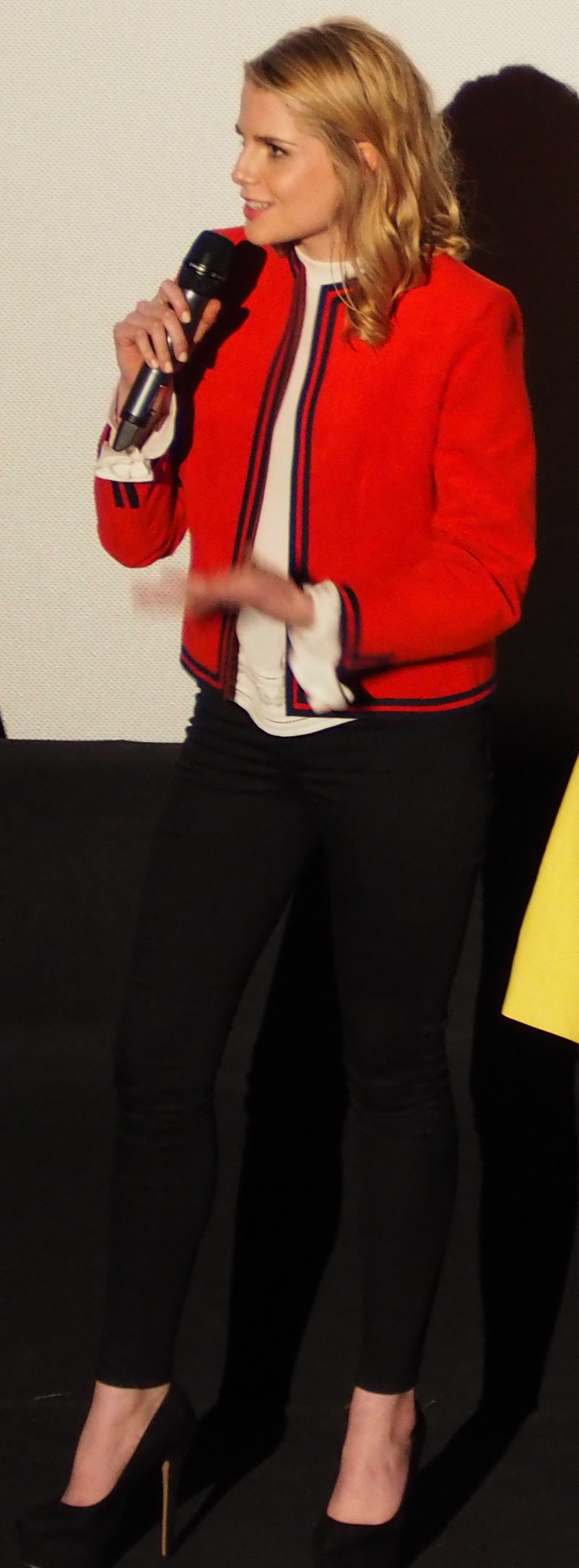
Boynton speaking at the premiere of The Blackcoat's Daughter at the 2015 Toronto Film Festival

Boynton appeared as "sullen mean girl" Rose alongside Emma Roberts and Kiernan Shipka in The Blackcoat's Daughter (2015). She prepared for the film by watching films that dealt with isolation and grief, such as Rosemary’s Baby on the recommendation of director Oz Perkins. Chuck Bowen of Slant Magazine wrote that Roberts, Shipka, and Boyton were "poignant in their minimalist roles". Boynton starred in the coming-of-age film Sing Street (2016) as Raphina, an aspiring model with "huge hair, bright make-up and colourful clothes". Boynton described her role as "the muse character, in a way, but only because she has put herself there". She adopted an Irish accent for the film and was instructed by director John Carney to create a backstory "in much more detail than [she] had before." The film premiered to critical praise at the Sundance Film Festival and garnered a Golden Globe nomination for Best Motion Picture – Musical or Comedy.

She appeared as ghostly bride Polly Parsons in the gothic-horror film I Am the Pretty Thing That Lives in the House (2016), which opened at the Toronto International Film Festival to mixed reception. Boynton starred alongside Katee Sackhoff in indie-horror Don't Knock Twice (2016). Noel Murray of the Los Angeles Times praised Sackhoff and Boynton's "volatile chemistry", stating that "they bring so much life to the material that it’s almost like they’ve been tricked into thinking they’re in a better movie."

She portrayed J. D. Salinger's second wife, Claire Douglas, in Rebel in the Rye (2017). Rebel in the Rye premiered at the Sundance Film Festival and was panned by critics. Boynton played Countess Helena Andrenyi in the 2017 adaptation of Murder on the Orient Express. The film was a box office success and received mixed reviews, though the performances of the cast were praised. In the same year, Boynton starred as Allison Adams, a college student turned drug addict, in the Netflix series Gypsy (2017). Boynton empathised with her character's desire to regress into early life while struggling with control. Daniel Fienberg of The Hollywood Reporter cited Boynton as "splendid-but-underused" and among the "best of the supporting turns". She appeared as Andrea, the daughter of a cult leader, in Apostle (2018), which was praised by critics.

Boynton starred opposite Rami Malek as Freddie Mercury's partner Mary Austin in Bohemian Rhapsody (2018). She watched Austin's interviews to "gauge what she was happy to be open about" and spoke to Brian May to research the role. The film became the highest-grossing biographical film of all time and met mixed criticism. Time praised her for playing the role with "charm and vigour" while the Irish Independent wrote that her scenes were the "quietest, most touching moments" of the film. Bohemian Rhapsody received four Academy Awards and earned the cast a nomination for Outstanding Performance by a Cast in a Motion Picture at the 25th Screen Actors Guild Awards.

Boynton appears opposite Taron Egerton in Glimpse, a short virtual reality animated film premiering at the Virtual Reality showcase of the Venice Film Festival in 2019.

Since 2019, Boynton has starred in the Netflix series The Politician, portraying Astrid Sloane, the protagonist's "ruthless" and "hyperbolically privileged" rival. Boynton described the experience "liberating", saying that playing an antagonistic character added depth to the role. The Hollywood Reporter praised Boynton's "razor-sharp delivery" but remarked that her written dialogue prevented her from being "spectacular".

=== 2021–present ===
In February 2020, it was announced that Boynton would be both executive producer and lead actor in the upcoming Marianne Faithfull biopic, Faithfull. Production was originally due to begin in October 2020, but was delayed indefinitely due to the ongoing COVID-19 pandemic. By August 2022, Boynton had dropped out of Faithfull owing to creative differences.

Boynton had a supporting role as Charlotte, a Harrods shop assistant, in Locked Down (2021), released on HBO Max. The film received mixed reviews. She guest-starred opposite Kit Harington in the second season of Amazon Video's anthology series Modern Love in 2021.

In 2022, Boynton appeared in ITV's six-part miniseries The Ipcress File as Jean Courtney, Harry Palmer's colleague, and also starred in the Stephen Williams-directed biographical film Chevalier as Marie Antoinette. She starred as Lady Frances "Frankie" Derwent in BritBox's three-part adaptation of Agatha Christie's crime novel Why Didn't They Ask Evans?, and as Lea Marquis in the Netflix adaptation of Louis Bayard's Gothic thriller novel The Pale Blue Eye. In August 2022, it was announced that Boynton would star in The Greatest Hits, written and directed by Ned Benson for Searchlight Pictures; the film was released in April 2024 to mixed reviews.

In 2023, Boynton portrayed Proust Barbie in the fantasy comedy Barbie; she was originally meant to have more scenes, but due to test audiences' unfamiliarity with Marcel Proust, and thus inability to appreciate the humour associated with the Proust Barbie character, she only appears in a brief cameo in the finished film. In June 2023, Boynton was cast as Ruth Ellis in an ITV adaptation based on the account given in true crime author Carol Ann Lee's book A Fine Day for Hanging: The Real Ruth Ellis Story. Originally given the simple title of Ruth, the adaptation was announced as having been retitled to A Cruel Love: The Ruth Ellis Story on 19 February 2024, with a first-look image of Boynton in character as Ellis being released on the same day. The series premiered in 2025 to generally positive reviews.

Having long sought to adapt a novel herself, Boynton revealed in 2025 interviews that she was working on several adaptations of as-yet unknown novels. In September 2025, Boynton starred in the music video for the Wolf Alice single "Just Two Girls". In March 2026, it was announced that Boynton had been cast as Lady Rohanne Webber in the second season of A Knight of the Seven Kingdoms.

In 2026, Boynton starred as Eleanor in Remnants, a short horror film written and directed by Ti West and released exclusively for the Apple Vision Pro. It was the first horror film produced in the Apple Immersive Video format.

== Personal life ==
Boynton divides her time between London, New York, and Los Angeles; she considers herself to be "painfully British" while simultaneously feeling "sort of" American.

Boynton has expressed an affinity for the gothic genre.

Boynton was in a relationship with her Bohemian Rhapsody co-star Rami Malek from 2017 to 2023. As of 2024 Boynton was in a relationship with Scottish musician Murdo Mitchell.

== Filmography ==
Key
†	Denotes productions that have not yet been released

=== Film ===
Year	Title	Role	Notes
2006	Miss Potter	Young Beatrix Potter	
2013	Copperhead	Esther Hagadorn	
2013	Hymn to Pan	Holliday	Short film
2015	The Blackcoat's Daughter	Rose	
2016	Lock In	Lucy	Short film
2016	Sing Street	Raphina	
2016	I Am the Pretty Thing That Lives in the House	Polly Parsons	
2016	Don't Knock Twice	Chloe	
2017	Rebel in the Rye	Claire Douglas	
2017	Let Me Go	Emily	
2017	Murder on the Orient Express	Countess Helena Andrenyi	
2018	Apostle	Andrea Howe	
2018	Bohemian Rhapsody	Mary Austin	
2020	Ben Platt Live from Radio City Music Hall	Herself	
2021	Locked Down	Charlotte	
2021	Glimpse	Rice	Virtual reality animated short
2022	Chevalier	Marie Antoinette	
2022	The Pale Blue Eye	Lea Marquis	
2023	Barbie	Proust Barbie	
2024	The Greatest Hits	Harriet Gibbons	
2026	See You When I See You	Emily Whistler	
2026	Remnants	Eleanor Thomas	Immersive short film
2028	The Beatles – A Four-Film Cinematic Event †	Jane Asher	Filming
TBA	A Colt Is My Passport †		Post-production

=== Television ===
Year	Title	Role	Notes
2007	Ballet Shoes	Posy Fossil	TV film
2008	Sense & Sensibility	Margaret Dashwood	TV miniseries
2010	Mo	Henrietta Norton	TV film
2011	Lewis	Zoe Suskin	Episode: "The Gift of Promise"
2011, 2014	Borgia	Sister Lucia	Episodes: "God's Monster", "1497"
2014	Endeavour	Petra Briers	Episode: "Nocturne"
2014	Law & Order: UK	Georgia Hutton	Episode: "Bad Romance"
2015	Life in Squares	Angelica Bell	TV miniseries
2016	The Dreams of Bethany Mellmoth	Bethany Mellmoth	Main role, TV short/pilot
2017	Gypsy	Allison Adams	Main role
2019–2020	The Politician	Astrid Sloan	Main role
2021	Modern Love	Paula	Episode: "Strangers on a (Dublin) Train", main role
2022	The Ipcress File	Jean Courtney	Main role
2022	Why Didn't They Ask Evans?	Lady Frankie Derwent	Main role
2025	A Cruel Love: The Ruth Ellis Story	Ruth Ellis	Lead role; Four-part drama
TBA	A Knight of the Seven Kingdoms	Lady Rohanne Webber	Season 2

=== Music videos ===
Year	Title	Role	Artist
2013	"Fall at Your Feet"	Lady	Saint Raymond
2025	"Just Two Girls"		Wolf Alice

== Awards and nominations ==
Year	Association	Category	Work	Result	Ref.
2007	Young Artist Awards	Best Performance in a Feature Film - Supporting Young Actress	Miss Potter	Nominated	
2016	Online Film & Television Association	Best Breakthrough Performance: Female	Sing Street	Nominated	
2017	Bentonville Film Festival	Jury Award for Best Ensemble	Let Me Go	Won	
2019	Screen Actors Guild Awards	Outstanding Performance by a Cast in a Motion Picture	Bohemian Rhapsody	Nominated	
2022	Deauville Film Festival	Prix du Nouvel Hollywood	-	Won	

== See also ==
- List of British actors
