= The Blackcoat's Daughter =

2015 film by Osgood Perkins

- Theatrical release poster
- Directed by: Osgood Perkins
- Written by: Osgood Perkins
- Produced by: Adrienne Biddle; Rob Paris; Bryan Bertino; Robert Menzies; Alphonse Ghossein
- Starring: Emma Roberts; Kiernan Shipka; Lucy Boynton; Lauren Holly; James Remar
- Cinematography: Julie Kirkwood
- Edited by: Brian Ufberg
- Music by: Elvis Perkins
- Production companies: Paris Film; Unbroken Pictures; Zed Filmworks; Go Insane Films; Traveling Picture Show Company; Highland Film Group; 120db Films
- Distributed by: A24 DirecTV Cinema (United States); ABMO Elevation Pictures (Canada)
- Release dates: September 12, 2015 (TIFF); March 31, 2017 (United States)
- Running time: 93 minutes
- Countries: Canada; United States
- Box office: $143,545

The Blackcoat's Daughter (also known as February) is a 2015 supernatural psychological horror film written and directed by Osgood Perkins in his feature-length directorial debut. The film stars Emma Roberts, Kiernan Shipka, Lucy Boynton, Lauren Holly, and James Remar.

The film premiered at the 2015 Toronto International Film Festival before it was released through video-on-demand on February 16, 2017, by DirecTV Cinema. It was released theatrically in the United States on March 31, 2017, by A24. The film received generally positive reviews.

== Plot ==
The plot is split into three timelines. The first two, "Rose" and "Joan", intercut between each other before a third timeline, "Kat", is introduced and comprises the film's climax.

Rose

In February, students at the prestigious Bramford Academy, a Catholic boarding school in upstate New York, are about to be picked up by their parents for a week-long break. Kat, a freshman, and Rose, a senior student, are left behind. Suspecting she may be pregnant, Rose has lied to her parents about the vacation dates to buy time. Kat has a premonitory dream of her parents dying in a car crash. That night, Rose departs with her boyfriend to inform him of the pregnancy. Meanwhile, Kat receives a call. Hours later, Rose returns and finds Kat in the boiler room, repeatedly prostrating before the boiler. Kat speaks cryptically and claims her parents are dead, disturbing Rose. After Rose leaves, Kat's body starts convulsing and contorting in bed.

The next morning, Rose and a sickly-looking Kat join the nuns for breakfast, where Kat behaves erratically, vomits, and curses at the nuns. After receiving an alarming phone call, the nuns order Rose to shovel the driveway "down to the earth" for the abrupt return of Headmaster Gordon. Gordon arrives with a policeman; as they enter the nuns' cabin, a bloodstain is seen on the wall, and the men react with shock to something offscreen.

Joan

A young woman, Joan, arrives at a bus stop after escaping a mental institution. A friendly older man named Bill offers her a ride with him and his wife Linda. They stop at a motel and Joan showers, revealing a scar on her shoulder. A flashback shows her being shot by a policeman. Bill tells Joan that he picked her up because she reminded him of his deceased daughter, revealed to be Rose – the next day will be the ninth anniversary of Rose's death, on which her parents visit Bramford every year. Joan recognizes Rose's name and retreats to the bathroom, where she suppresses laughter. Joan is revealed to be a fake name; the real Joan was a woman she killed to steal her ID.

Kat

During the days leading up to winter break, Kat is in contact with an entity depicted alternately as a horned shadow and a gravelly voice on the phone. This entity informs her of her parents' impending death, and instructs her to kill everyone. After breakfast, the nuns receive a phone call informing them that Kat's parents have died. After Rose is dismissed to shovel the driveway, Kat murders both nuns. She pursues Rose; shortly after Rose has her period, confirming she is not pregnant, Kat stabs her to death and beheads her. Gordon and the policeman find Kat prostrating in front of the boiler again, with the severed heads of her three victims next to her. She exclaims "Hail Satan!" before the policeman shoots her in the shoulder, revealing that "Joan" is Kat. Kat is detained in a mental hospital, where a priest performs an exorcism. The exorcism is seemingly successful, but Kat begs the demon not to leave her before it vanishes.

"Joan", the Kat of nine years later, murders Bill and Linda when they pull over in Bramford. She beheads their corpses and brings the heads to the boiler room of the academy, seemingly in an effort to summon the demon she lost years ago. However, she finds the boiler cold and unused. Now completely alone, she leaves the academy and breaks down crying in the middle of the road.

== Cast ==
- Emma Roberts as Joan, an asylum escapee traveling with Bill and Linda.
- Kiernan Shipka as Katherine, an awkward and creepy freshman who is being haunted by a dark spirit while she is at school with Rose.
- Lucy Boynton as Rose, a daring young woman in her senior year of high school who fears she might be pregnant. She is joined by Kat during the winter break while they are stuck at school.
- Lauren Holly as Linda, Rose's mother and Bill's wife who dislikes Joan.
- James Remar as Bill, Rose's father, and Linda's husband.
- Greg Ellwand as Father Brian, a priest at the boarding school.
- Elena Krausz as Ms. Prescott, a nurse at the boarding school.
- Heather Tod Mitchell as Ms. Drake, a nurse at the boarding school.
- Peter James Haworth as Mr. Gordon, the headmaster of the boarding school.
- Peter Gray as Rick, Rose's boyfriend.
- Emma Holzer as Lizzy, Rose's friend who finds out first that Rose might be pregnant.

== Production ==
Although the film only received a wide release after I Am the Pretty Thing That Lives in the House was shown, The Blackcoat's Daughter was filmed first, making it Perkins' debut film. Perkins noted that he intended to "tell a sad story" about loss, and used the horror genre and the possession subgenre, as a "Trojan Horse". Perkins noted that he could have made the film without this but felt its omission would have resulted in the audience's engagement with the story being different. Financing the film was particularly difficult, and Perkins attributed this to the "slumping" success of the horror genre, since the script was completed in 2012 but filming did not begin until 2015. Even though those to whom Perkins showed the script were enthusiastic about it, many of them believed that it would be impossible to make. After the casting of Kiernan Shipka and Emma Roberts was announced in April 2014 and the casting of Lucy Boynton, Lauren Holly, and James Remar was announced in February 2015, production began.

Principal photography for the film began in February 2015 in Kemptville, Ontario, Canada and the film's soundtrack was scored by Perkins' brother, Elvis Perkins, a singer-songwriter. Perkins had never written a film score before, and he found the medium confining, noting that the restrictions "almost killed him".

== Release ==
The film had its premiere at the Toronto International Film Festival on September 12, 2015. Shortly after, A24 and DirecTV Cinema acquired US distribution rights to the film. The Canadian distribution rights were acquired by ABMO Films. The film had its US premiere at the Fantastic Fest on September 24, 2015. In November 2015, it was announced that the film had sold to various international territories at the AFM, including the United Kingdom, France, Australia, New Zealand, Latin America, Poland, the Philippines, Thailand, Indonesia, Malaysia, Vietnam and the Middle East. The film was retitled from February to The Blackcoat's Daughter. The film was scheduled to be released by DirecTV Cinema on July 14, 2016. This was pushed back to August 25, 2016, before opening in a limited release on September 30. The film was then pulled from the schedule and pushed back to an undisclosed 2017 date. It was released on February 16, 2017, through DirecTV Cinema, before being released on March 31, 2017, in a limited release and through video on demand by A24. On Netflix UK, it was released under the title February.

== Reception ==
On Rotten Tomatoes the film has an approval rating of 77%, based on 77 reviews, with an average rating of 6.6/10, and the site's consensus of the film reads: "Slow-building and atmospheric, The Blackcoat's Daughter resists girls-in-peril clichés in a supernatural thriller that serves as a strong calling card for debuting writer-director Oz Perkins." On Metacritic, the film has a score of 68 out of 100, based on reviews from 17 critics, indicating "generally favorable reviews".

Leslie Felperin of The Hollywood Reporter wrote: "As with so many of the best mystery-horror films, the optimum way to enjoy a first viewing of this is try to remain as ignorant as possible about what happens. That said, it also brims with tiny, blink-and-you'll-miss-them details that will repay repeat viewings." Joe Leydon of Variety magazine wrote: "In addition to everything else he does right in The Blackcoat's Daughter, Perkins plays fair: When you replay the movie in your mind after the final fadeout, you realize that every twist was dutifully presaged, and the final reveal was hidden in plain sight all along." It was included in The New York Times' list of "13 Scariest Horror Movies to Watch" in 2020.

== Bibliography ==
- Adrian Gmelch (2026). Poetry and Horror: The Films of Osgood Perkins. Create Space. ISBN 9798177116808.
