= The Monkey =

Short story by Stephen King

- Short story by Stephen King
- Country: United States
- Language: English
- Genre: Horror

Publication
- Published in: Gallery
- Publication type: Periodical
- Media type: Magazine
- Publication date: November 1980

"The Monkey" is a 1980 horror short story by Stephen King featuring a cursed cymbal-banging monkey toy. The story was first published as a booklet included in Gallery magazine in 1980. It was significantly revised and published in King's collection Skeleton Crew in 1985.

"The Monkey" was nominated for a British Fantasy Award for best short story in 1982 and best horror at that time.

== Plot summary ==
"The Monkey" follows Hal Shelburn, a man haunted by a wind-up monkey toy that seems to bring death and misfortune. The story begins when Hal's son, Petey, discovers the monkey in a box while exploring the attic of Hal's childhood home. Hal reacts with dread, recalling his childhood experiences with the toy.

In flashbacks, Hal remembers finding the monkey among his father's belongings in a storage closet. As a child, Hal noticed a disturbing pattern: whenever the monkey clapped its cymbals, a death or calamity followed. These events included the fatal fall of Hal's childhood friend Johnny McCabe from a treehouse and the death of his aunt Ida's cat, which was run over by a car. Believing the monkey was cursed, young Hal threw it into a dry well near his home.

Decades later, the monkey inexplicably resurfaces. Its appearance unsettles Hal, who fears for the safety of his family. Determined to destroy the toy, Hal and Petey go to Crystal Lake with the monkey in a flight bag weighted with rocks. Hal rows to the deepest part of Crystal Lake, where he throws the bag into the water. As the bag sinks, Hal hears the faint sound of the monkey's cymbals clapping. During the disposal, the boat starts breaking up, but Hal manages to swim ashore safely to Petey. The story ends with a newspaper clipping showing that hundreds of fish in the lake have died as a result.

== Commentary ==
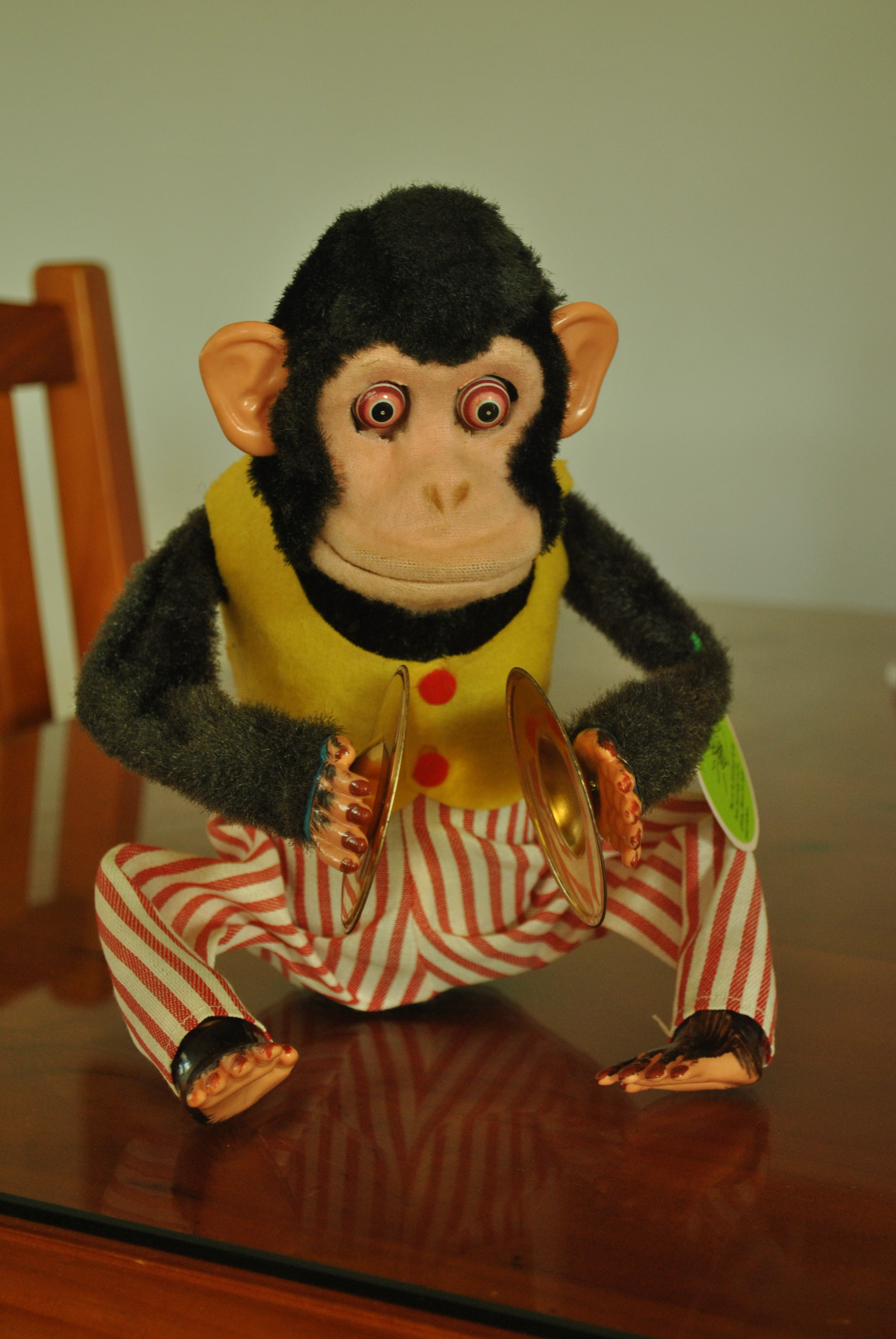
The antagonist of "The Monkey" is a malevolent cymbal-banging monkey toy.

Harold Bloom said King's short story "plays the same theme" as the "more famous" "The Monkey's Paw" by W. W. Jacobs.

=== Time parallels and the inescapable past ===
Leonard G. Heldreth wrote in Journal of the Fantastic in the Arts that the short story explores time parallels and the connection between past and present through the reappearance of a toy monkey. When Hal Shelburn finds the monkey in a deteriorating Ralston-Purina box, it vividly recalls his childhood, prompting him to quote his long-dead Uncle Will and compare the scene to a closet in his childhood home in Hartford, thinking, "I won't think about that." Despite his efforts to suppress these thoughts, they overwhelm him, as the past remains an inescapable and burdensome part of his identity. Hal struggles to cope, seeking "to get through it so it would be gone again", as the monkey haunted his childhood, returning each time he discarded it. During the story, he sinks the monkey in a lake, though he imagines it being retrieved. King's characters often anticipate the future ambiguously, as Hal reflects, "those were only things that might be," though evidence suggests precognition.

=== Guilt, subconscious, and the monkey's symbolism ===
Joe Sanders, writing in Extrapolation, says the story portrays a father's struggle with a malevolent toy that seems to cause violent deaths. Critics debate whether the toy represents external evil or Hal Shelburn’s inner guilt and subconscious desires. Douglas Winter views the monkey as an external force of chance, while Tony Magistrale connects it to Hal’s unresolved guilt and subconscious mind. Gene Doty identifies a link between Hal and the monkey, interpreting it as an ambiguous embodiment of persistent, incomprehensible evil.

Sanders says Hal's memories of the monkey highlight his unreliability as a narrator, blending childhood delight with instinctive disgust. His attempts to rid himself of the monkey fail, reflecting his inability to confront its symbolic meaning. The story parallels Freud's concept of the id, with the monkey representing suppressed destructive impulses. The narrative culminates in Hal's unsuccessful attempt to destroy the monkey, leaving its threat unresolved.

=== Intertextuality and Poe's influence ===
Marta Miquel-Baldellou analyzes the story as a narrative influenced by Edgar Allan Poe's "The Murders in the Rue Morgue". The story reflects intertextual links, particularly through the symbolic use of the monkey, which parallels the razor-wielding orangutan in Poe's tale. Both are connected to psychological and creative forces, drawing on Jungian concepts of the shadow, encompassing Eros and Thanatos.

Miquel-Baldellou says Hal confronts suppressed childhood trauma through the monkey toy, which symbolizes repressed fears and unresolved influence. The analysis also references Harold Bloom’s "anxiety of influence", portraying King's struggle to reconcile Poe's legacy within his own literary development. Biographical similarities between King and Poe, including the absence of a father figure, reinforce their shared thematic exploration of unresolved fears and creativity.

== Film adaptations ==
In 2022, an official adaptation of "The Monkey" was produced under the terms of King's Dollar Baby contract. The hour-long short film, written and directed by filmmaker Spencer Sherry and shot in the Capital District of New York State, premiered in May 2023.

In May 2023, it was announced that Osgood Perkins would write and direct a feature-length adaptation with Theo James starring in the film. James Wan produced the film through his Atomic Monster banner. The film was released in the United States on February 21, 2025.

== See also ==
- Stephen King short fiction bibliography
- Killer toy
