= Keeper (2025 film) =

Film by Osgood Perkins

- Theatrical release poster
- Directed by: Osgood Perkins
- Written by: Nick Lepard
- Produced by: Chris Ferguson; Jesse Savath
- Starring: Tatiana Maslany; Rossif Sutherland; Birkett Turton; Eden Weiss
- Cinematography: Jeremy Cox
- Edited by: Graham Fortin; Greg Ng
- Music by: Edo Van Breemen
- Production companies: Wayward Entertainment; Big Rodeo Films; Oddfellows Pictures
- Distributed by: Neon
- Release date: November 14, 2025
- Running time: 99 minutes
- Countries: United States; Canada
- Language: English
- Budget: $6 million
- Box office: $6.2 million

Keeper is a 2025 folk horror film directed by Osgood Perkins and written by Nick Lepard. The film stars Tatiana Maslany, Rossif Sutherland, Birkett Turton, and Eden Weiss. The film follows a couple spending their anniversary weekend at a secluded cabin in the woods, where strange things begin occurring and the cabin's dark secrets are revealed.

Keeper was released in the United States on November 14, 2025 by Neon, and received mixed reviews from critics.

== Plot ==
For their one-year anniversary, Malcolm takes his girlfriend Liz on a weekend trip to a secluded cabin in the countryside. Upon arrival, Liz finds a boxed cake in the cabin, which Malcolm claims is a gift from the caretaker. Their dinner is interrupted by the arrival of Malcolm's obnoxious cousin Darren, and Darren's European model girlfriend, Minka. Later, at Malcolm's insistence, Liz eats a slice of the cake, ignoring Minka's warning that it tastes awful.

Liz becomes haunted by strange visions of screaming, bloodied women and a pregnant woman who looks identical to her. At night, she is drawn to the cake and finishes it in one sitting, despite finding severed fingers inside.

In the morning, Minka is attacked by an unseen force while walking alone in the woods. Malcolm leaves to take care of a patient, but promises to come back that evening. While alone, Liz calls her friend Maggie, who offers to come collect Liz. Strange creatures begin to appear in the house and follow Liz. She encounters a ghostly apparition of Minka and a woman wearing a plastic bag over her head. Darren arrives and demands to be let inside despite Liz's reservations. She hides in the bathroom as he wanders around the house with a cleaver before being killed by unseen forces. Increasingly disturbed by the strange events around her, Liz tells Maggie to come get her, but cannot get a signal. When Malcolm returns, a distraught Liz says she wants to leave, but he calms her and convinces her to share a drink before they leave.

An increasingly suspicious Liz finds an old photograph of Malcolm with what appears to be his wife and daughters. Liz furiously confronts Malcolm and demands to be taken home. Malcolm reveals that 200 years ago, as adolescents, he and Darren encountered a pregnant woman—the one from Liz's visions—on their property and shot her in the leg. After she gave birth to the creatures, which have been appearing around Liz, Darren and Malcolm shot her in the head. They have spent the last 200 years feeding the creatures in exchange for an extended lifespan; the screaming women in Liz's visions are their past victims. He also explains that the cake was drugged and was intended to knock Liz out.

Malcolm locks Liz in the basement. She is surrounded by spirits, including the woman with the bag over her head, who removes it to reveal a face with multiple eyes, noses, and mouths. The creatures embrace Liz, recognizing her resemblance to their mother, whose head is preserved in a jar of honey. Liz both laughs hysterically and screams in horror. Meanwhile, Malcolm ages rapidly before being attacked by one of the creatures.

The following morning, an elderly Malcolm is hung upside down from a tree. Liz, her eyes now completely black like the creatures', approaches him and reveals that the creatures have asked her to stay with them. She forcefeeds him the drugged cake as he pleads to be freed and promises that he genuinely loves her. Liz coldly accuses him of lying, drowns him by dunking his head into a jar of honey, and walks away.

== Cast ==
- Tatiana Maslany as Liz
- Rossif Sutherland as Dr. Malcolm Westbridge
  - Glen Gordon as Teenage Malcolm
- Birkett Turton as Darren Westbridge
  - Logan Pierce as Teenage Darren
- Eden Weiss as Minka
- Cassandra Ebner and Tess Degenstein as Baghead
  - Tess Degenstein also plays Maggie
- Erin Boyes as Julia
- Claire Friesen as Louise
- Christin Park as Leslie
- Gina Vultaggio as Francis

== Production ==
In May 2024, Keeper was announced as a film for sale at the Cannes Film Market, with Osgood Perkins directing from a screenplay written by Nick Lepard. Tatiana Maslany and Rossif Sutherland were attached to star in the film, and Chris Ferguson and Jesse Savath were producing for Oddfellows. Keeper marks the third collaboration between Neon and Perkins after Longlegs and The Monkey. In July 2024, Perkins revealed that both Keeper and The Monkey had wrapped production, with principal photography for the former having taken place in Vancouver. Jeremy Cox serves as the cinematographer, while Edo Van Breemen composed the score.

The film was shot in its entirety while work on The Monkey was held up due to the 2023 Hollywood labor disputes. Several of The Monkey's cast and crew in Canada were trying to find ways to keep working, so Perkins and Ferguson found a Canadian writer who was not part of the Writers Guild of America to write the script. They also hired Canadian actors who could waive their SAG-AFTRA status in order to film.

== Release ==
At the 2024 Cannes Film Market, distribution rights were sold to Neon in United States and Elevation Pictures in Canada. Neon also purchased the worldwide rights as it expanded into international distribution sales. The film was released theatrically in the United States and Canada on November 14, 2025. The film was released a day prior in Australia, where it was co-distributed by Rialto Distribution. It was originally scheduled to be released on October 3, 2025.

== Reception ==
On the review aggregator website Rotten Tomatoes, 50% of 111 critics' reviews are positive, with an average rating of 5.6/10. The website's consensus reads: "More a collection of unsettling moments than an altogether cohesive story, Keeper is too half-baked to have much staying power despite a committed turn from Tatiana Maslany." On Metacritic, it has a weighted average score of 54 out of 100 based on 20 critics, indicating "mixed or average" reviews. Audiences polled by CinemaScore gave the film an average grade of "D+" on an A+ to F scale.

In a positive review, Jesse Hassenger from The Guardian noted that the film is "not as rich as Sinners nor as narratively ambitious as Weapons, two of 2025's standard-bearers for original horror. But when Keeper finishes up, its tight confines feel satisfying, correct and unlikely to spawn a sequel." Kristy Puchko from Mashable said that the film "is a surreal and sensational thriller. Perkins walks us into a nightmare, baking tension and unhinged treats with sickening sound effects, spectacular creature design, and a smartly savage script." In a more negative review, Alexander Mooney from Slant Magazine found the film to be "assiduously advertised, sloppily scripted, stylistically constipated, plated with sarcasm, and never, ever frightening."

== Awards ==
Tatiana Maslany won the Vancouver Film Critics Circle award for Best Actress in a Canadian Film at the Vancouver Film Critics Circle Awards 2025.

== Bibliography ==
- Adrian Gmelch (2026). Poetry and Horror: The Films of Osgood Perkins. Create Space. ISBN 9798177116808.
