= Rob Paris (producer) =

American film producer

Rob Paris is an American film producer and former talent agent. He began his entertainment career at CAA as a literary agent, then moving to Ed Snider's production company, and finally establishing his own firm, ParisFilm.

== Filmography ==
- The Maiden Heist (2009)
- Dirty Girl (2010)
- Scream: The Inside Story (2011) - Documentary film, himself
- Gambit (2012)
- Everly (2014)
- The Blackcoat's Daughter (2015)
- I Am the Pretty Thing That Lives in the House (2016)
- The Last Laugh (2019)
- Please Baby Please (2022)
