= Graham Boynton =

British writer and journalist

- Born: United Kingdom
- Occupation: Journalist
- Notable credit: Author of Last Days in Cloud Cuckooland
- Spouse: Adriaane Pielou
- Children: Emma Louise Boynton and Lucy Boynton

Graham Boynton is a British-Zimbabwean journalist, consultant, travel writer and editor.

== Background ==
Boynton was born in the United Kingdom and raised in Bulawayo, Rhodesia where he was educated at Peterhouse Boys' School and Christian Brothers College. He later graduated from the University of Natal in neighbouring South Africa.

Boynton began a career in journalism as a political reporter during the Rhodesian Bush War. His reportage in South Africa led to the apartheid government declaring him an "undesirable alien", after which they deported him. He subsequently established himself in London, writing for international magazines. In the mid-1980s, he was appointed as the editor of Business Traveller magazine. In 1988, he moved to New York City, where he worked as a writer and editor for Condé Nast Publications for ten years. He was an editor at Condé Nast Traveler and a contracted writer for Vanity Fair. He also wrote for a number of other publications in America and the UK.

In 1998, he returned to the UK to become the travel editor of the Daily and Sunday Telegraph. A year earlier, he published Last Days in Cloud Cuckooland about the end of white minority rule in South Africa. It was named as one of the Washington Post's Best Non Fiction Books of 1998. He was the Group Travel Editor of the Telegraph Media Group from 1998 to December 2011.

He also regularly contributes pieces about Zimbabwe.

Boynton's latest book, Wild: The Life of Peter Beard: Photographer, Adventurer, Lover, was published in October 2022.

== Family ==
He is married to travel writer Adriaane Pielou and they have two daughters together, Emma-Louise, who works in broadcast journalism, and actress Lucy Boynton.

== See also ==
- Whites in Zimbabwe
