= Rebel in the Rye =

- Theatrical release poster
- Directed by: Danny Strong
- Written by: Danny Strong
- Based on: J. D. Salinger: A Life by Kenneth Slawenski
- Produced by: Bruce Cohen; Jason Shuman; Danny Strong; Molly Smith; Trent Luckinbill; Thad Luckinbill
- Starring: Nicholas Hoult; Zoey Deutch; Kevin Spacey; Sarah Paulson; Brian d'Arcy James; Victor Garber; Hope Davis; Lucy Boynton
- Cinematography: Kramer Morgenthau
- Edited by: Joseph Krings
- Music by: Bear McCreary
- Production company: Black Label Media
- Distributed by: IFC Films
- Release dates: January 24, 2017 (Sundance); September 8, 2017 (United States)
- Running time: 106 minutes
- Country: United States
- Language: English
- Box office: $944,370

Rebel in the Rye is a 2017 American biographical drama film directed and written by Danny Strong. It is based on the book J. D. Salinger: A Life by Kenneth Slawenski, about the life of writer J. D. Salinger during and after World War II. The film stars Nicholas Hoult, Zoey Deutch, Kevin Spacey, Sarah Paulson, Brian d'Arcy James, Victor Garber, Hope Davis, and Lucy Boynton.

The film had its world premiere at the Sundance Film Festival on January 24, 2017, and was released by IFC Films on September 8, 2017.

== Premise ==
The life of author J. D. Salinger from his youth to the World War II era, including his romantic life and the publication of his debut novel The Catcher in the Rye.

== Cast ==
- Nicholas Hoult as J. D. Salinger, an American author
- Zoey Deutch as Oona O'Neill, the daughter of playwright Eugene O'Neill and the romantic partner of the young Salinger.
- Kevin Spacey as Whit Burnett, a lecturer at Columbia University, editor of Story magazine, and a mentor of the young Salinger.
- Sarah Paulson as Dorothy Olding, the loyal agent who supported the young Salinger throughout his career.
- Brian d'Arcy James as Giroux
- Victor Garber as Sol Salinger, Salinger's father
- Hope Davis as Miriam Salinger, Salinger's mother
- Lucy Boynton as Claire Douglas
- James Urbaniak as Gus Lobrano
- Adam Busch as Nigel Bench
- Jefferson Mays as William Maxwell
- Bernard White as Swami Nikhilananda
- Kristine Forseth as Shirley Blaney

== Production ==
On April 29, 2014, it was announced that screenwriter-actor Danny Strong would make his directorial debut with biographical film Salinger's War, based on the non-fiction book J. D. Salinger: A Life by Kenneth Slawenski, about the life of young author J. D. Salinger during the early 1940s. Strong bought the book with his own money and adapted the film's script, which Black Label Media would finance, while Molly Smith, Trent Luckinbill, and Thad Luckinbill would produce the film along with Bruce Cohen, Jason Shuman, and Strong. On August 31, 2015, Nicholas Hoult was cast in the biopic to play Salinger, and the film was re-titled as Rebel in the Rye.

On January 19, 2016, Kevin Spacey joined the film to play Whit Burnett, a lecturer at Columbia University, editor of the Story magazine, and a mentor of the young Salinger. On February 12, 2016, Laura Dern, Brian d'Arcy James, and Hope Davis signed on to star in the film for unspecified roles. On March 9, 2016, Zoey Deutch joined the film to play the playwright Eugene O'Neill's daughter Oona O'Neill, who had a relationship with Salinger, and following her, Victor Garber also joined the film on next day to portray the role of Salinger's father, Sol Salinger. On April 7, 2016, Lucy Boynton joined the film for an unspecified role, and following her Sarah Paulson was cast to play Dorothy Olding, the loyal agent who supported the young Salinger throughout his career. In May 2016, it was revealed that James Urbaniak had been cast as Gus Lobrano.

Principal photography on the film began on April 26, 2016, in New York City. Bear McCreary composed the film's score.

== Release ==
The film had its world premiere at the 2017 Sundance Film Festival on January 24, 2017. Shortly after, IFC Films acquired distribution rights to the film. It was theatrically released on September 8, 2017.

== Reception ==
=== Box office ===
Rebel in the Rye had a limited release in four theaters in its first week which was expanded to 45 more screens in second week. In its first week of release, the film made $44,280 (an average of $11,070), and in its second week, it grossed $101,118 in the 49 theaters, with a cumulative total of $154,326.

=== Critical response ===
On review aggregation website Rotten Tomatoes, the film has an approval rating of 29% based on 89 reviews, and an average rating of 5.2/10. The site's critics consensus reads: "Rebel in the Rye attempts to dramatize J.D. Salinger's life and creative process, but falters with a lack of dramatic impetus or a cohesive thesis about the reclusive author." On Metacritic, which assigns a normalized rating to reviews, the film has a weighted average score 46 out of 100, based on 30 critics, indicating "mixed or average reviews".

Jordan Hoffman of The Guardian gave three stars out of five, saying, "J. D. Salinger drama catches attention but sinks into cliche".
