= Greg Ng =

Canadian film editor

- Born: Richmond, British Columbia, Canada
- Occupation: Film editor
- Years active: 2003–present

Greg Ng is a Canadian film editor, best known for his work in Horror films including, Longlegs (2024), The Monkey (2025), and Backrooms (2026).

== Early life and education ==
Gregory Ng grew up in Steveston, a neighborhood of Richmond, British Columbia, and attended St. Paul's elementary school. A lifelong fan of Star Wars, he traced his interest in filmmaking to watching behind-the-scenes footage on VHS as a child, and set his sights early on working in the film industry. He attended Vancouver College for high school, and the summer before graduating took an introductory filmmaking course at Vancouver Film School. He then studied film production at the University of British Columbia.

== Career ==
=== Film ===
Year	Title	Role	Note
2022	The Grizzlie Truth	Editor	
2024	Longlegs	Editor	
2025	Saints and Warriors	Editor	
2025	The Monkey	Editor	
2025	Keeper	Editor	
2026	Backrooms	Editor	

=== Television ===
Year	Title	Role	Note
2023	Bones of Crows	Editor	
