= I Am the Pretty Thing That Lives in the House =

2016 horror film

- Film poster
- Directed by: Osgood Perkins
- Written by: Osgood Perkins
- Produced by: Rob Paris; Robert Menzies
- Starring: Ruth Wilson; Bob Balaban; Lucy Boynton; Paula Prentiss
- Cinematography: Julie Kirkwood
- Edited by: Brian Ufberg
- Music by: Elvis Perkins
- Production companies: Netflix; Paris Film; Zed Filmworks; Go Insane Films
- Distributed by: Netflix
- Release dates: September 10, 2016 (TIFF); October 28, 2016 (Worldwide)
- Running time: 87 minutes
- Countries: Canada; United States
- Language: English

I Am the Pretty Thing That Lives in the House is a 2016 gothic supernatural horror film written and directed by Osgood Perkins. It stars Ruth Wilson as a live-in nurse who suspects her elderly employer's house may be haunted, and also features Paula Prentiss in her first major film role in 30 years.

I Am the Pretty Thing That Lives in the House had premiered at the Toronto International Film Festival on September 10, 2016, and was released worldwide on Netflix on October 28.

== Plot ==
Iris Blum, a retired horror writer, has dementia and lives in a remote house in Braintree, Massachusetts. The house was built by a man for his new bride, but the couple vanished on their wedding day and left the house unfurnished. Iris's estate manager, Mr. Waxcap, hires live-in nurse Lily Saylor to care for her. On Lily's first night in the house, the telephone is wrenched out of her hands by an unseen force. A figure in white walking backwards is seen. A spot of black mold appears on the wall and slowly grows as the months pass. Lily often finds a corner of the rug at the base of the stairs has been flipped up, but she is the only person in the house who walks on the first floor.

Iris only refers to Lily as "Polly", which Mr. Waxcap explains was the protagonist of her most popular novel, The Lady in the Walls. Lily opens a copy of the book and finds that the novel implies that Iris knew Polly during her lifetime and is retelling her story. In 1812, Polly, wearing a wedding dress and black blindfold, walks through the empty house under the watchful eye of her husband.

In the kitchen, Lily briefly hallucinates that her arms have become bloated and covered in black mold spots. That evening, she spots the reflection of the figure dressed in white standing in the room but when she turns, no one is there. She discovers a moldy cardboard box hidden away in a closet. Inside are rough drafts for The Lady in the Walls. She comes to believe that the novel may not be fictitious but rather depicts an actual murder committed in the house.

In 1812, the blindfolded Polly uses her hands to feel her surroundings, coming across a wall that has been stripped of its boards – the same section where mold is growing in present day. Polly raises her blindfold and sees the hole, locking eyes with her husband in confusion. Her husband suddenly bludgeons her to death with a hammer and hides her body behind the wall.

In the present, Lily tries to discuss the book with Iris. Iris angrily explains that Polly betrayed and abandoned her, and reminds her that even the prettiest of things eventually rot. Polly's ghost visits Iris, whispering in her ear. Investigating a mysterious sound, Lily finds the wall boards removed and piled beside the moldy wall. Turning, she sees what appears to be the ghost of Polly and dies from a heart attack.

Several days after, Mr. Waxcap discovers Lily's and Iris's bodies. Years later, a new family has moved into the house, watched over by Lily's ghost.

== Cast ==
- Ruth Wilson as Lily Saylor
- Paula Prentiss as Iris Blum
  - Erin Boyes as young Iris
- Bob Balaban as Mr. Waxcap
- Lucy Boynton as Polly Parsons
- Brad Milne as Groom
- Daniel Chichagov as Darling
- James Perkins as John
- Beatrix Perkins as Wendy

== Development ==
Writer-director Osgood Perkins originally intended for the story to be about the daughter of a male horror novelist, but he said that "one day, it just changed". Casting became easier once the film was financed; Perkins cited Wilson's talent and excitement for the project as two of the reasons she was chosen to play Lily. Prentiss – a family friend who, as well as her husband Richard Benjamin, had performed with Perkins' father, Anthony Perkins – was the director's only choice to play Iris. In a 2020 interview with director Mick Garris on Garris's podcast Post Mortem, Perkins revealed that the thematic nature of I Am the Pretty Thing That Lives in the House was intended to reflect Perkins’ own attempts at connecting with his dead father, Anthony Perkins.

== Release ==
I Am the Pretty Thing That Lives in the House premiered at the Toronto International Film Festival on September 10, 2016. It debuted on Netflix on October 28.

== Reception ==
=== Critical response ===
On Rotten Tomatoes, a review aggregator, the film reports that 59% of 22 surveyed critics gave the film a positive review; the average rating is 5.8/10. On Metacritic, the film has a score of 68 out of 100 based on 8 reviews, indicating "generally favorable" reviews.

Dennis Harvey of Variety wrote that the film's atmosphere can not overcome its minimalist and familiar writing. Stephen Dalton of The Hollywood Reporter called it "classy vintage horror with a literary flavor" and compared it to the works of David Lynch, Stanley Kubrick, and Roman Polanski. April Wolfe of The Village Voice described it as "the most atmospherically faithful adaptation ever of a Shirley Jackson book that never existed" and concluded that the film was "the very best of gothic horror." In rating it 2/5 stars, Nigel M. Smith of The Guardian wrote, "Osgood Perkins layers on the dread in his haunted house thriller. But as it becomes clear that there's no worthwhile story, the scares dissipate fast." A. A. Dowd of The A.V. Club called it a creepy, slow burn drama that works despite its lack of a conventional payoff.
