= Longlegs =

2024 American film by Osgood Perkins

- Theatrical release poster
- Directed by: Osgood Perkins
- Written by: Osgood Perkins
- Produced by: Dan Kagan; Brian Kavanaugh-Jones; Nicolas Cage; Dave Caplan; Chris Ferguson
- Starring: Maika Monroe; Blair Underwood; Alicia Witt; Nicolas Cage
- Cinematography: Andrés Arochi Tinajero
- Edited by: Greg Ng; Graham Fortin
- Music by: Zilgi
- Production companies: C2 Motion Picture Group; Traffic.; Range; Oddfellows; Saturn Films
- Distributed by: Neon
- Release dates: July 8, 2024 (Grauman's Egyptian Theatre); July 12, 2024 (United States)
- Running time: 101 minutes
- Country: United States
- Language: English
- Budget: $10 million
- Box office: $128 million

Longlegs is a 2024 American psychological horror-mystery film written and directed by Osgood Perkins. The film stars Maika Monroe, Blair Underwood, Alicia Witt, and Nicolas Cage. Set in the 1990s, the story follows a Federal Bureau of Investigation (FBI) agent assigned to hunt down an occult-obsessed serial killer responsible for a string of family murders across Oregon. The killer is dubbed Longlegs, and baffles the FBI with his perfect ability to seemingly leave zero trace of involvement at the crime scenes.

Longlegs premiered in Los Angeles at the Grauman's Egyptian Theatre on July 8, 2024, and was released theatrically in the United States by Neon on July 12, 2024. It received positive reviews and grossed $128 million worldwide on a budget of less than $10 million, becoming Neon's highest-grossing film domestically, the highest-grossing independent film of 2024, and Perkins's highest-grossing film.

== Plot ==
In 1974 Oregon, a young girl with a Polaroid camera follows a mysterious voice and encounters an erratic man in pale makeup.

Twenty years later, FBI agent Lee Harker is assigned by her supervisor, William Carter, to a case involving a series of murder–suicides in Oregon. Each case consists of a father killing his family, then himself, leaving behind a letter with Satanic glyphs signed "Longlegs", whose handwriting belongs to none of the family members. Lee exhibits possible clairvoyance and manages to decode Longlegs' letters.

Further investigation reveals that each family had a 9-year-old daughter born on the 14th day of the month. The murders all occurred within six days before or after said birthday, and their respective dates form an occult triangle symbol on a calendar, with one date missing. While at home talking on the phone to her mother, Ruth, Lee receives a coded birthday card from Longlegs, warning her that revealing its source will lead to her mother's murder.

Following a clue, Lee and William discover a doll containing a high-energy metal orb inside its head. After visiting a mental hospital to question Carrie Anne Camera, the sole survivor of Longlegs' murders who was visited previously by someone using Lee's name, William suspects Lee has a connection to Longlegs. Discovering that Ruth had filed a police report of an intruder approaching Lee the day before her 9th birthday, William instructs Lee to visit her. Ruth directs Lee to her childhood belongings, where she finds a Polaroid that reveals Longlegs to be the man who visited a young Lee on her birthday in the opening sequence.

Lee submits the photo, leading to Longlegs' arrest. Realizing the missing calendar date is that day, Lee fears an unknown accomplice of Longlegs will carry out the murder. In an interrogation room, Longlegs claims to serve "the man downstairs" and hints at Ruth's involvement in the murders before taking his own life by repeatedly bashing his face and forehead onto the metal table. Shortly after leaving the interrogation room, Lee is informed by William that Carrie Anne has died by suicide.

Agent Browning drives Lee to Ruth's home. Browning waits in the car outside while Lee searches the house, but Ruth approaches the car and fatally shoots Browning before destroying a doll resembling a young Lee, causing Lee to lose consciousness. In a vision, Lee discovers that she had been threatened by Longlegs as a child, who only spared her after Ruth pleaded for her life. In return for sparing Lee, Longlegs demanded Ruth's servitude; Ruth agreed, allowing Longlegs to live in the Harker basement and create Satanic dolls that Ruth, posing as a nun, delivered to households, causing each family's patriarch to commit familicide. Lee's doll blocked her memories of Longlegs while influencing her with his magic.

Lee awakens in the basement and answers the phone, where a demonic voice warns her about William's daughter Ruby's 9th birthday party, scheduled for that day. Lee rushes to save the Carters, whose deaths would complete Longlegs' triangle. She finds Ruth has already delivered the doll and possessed the family. After William murders his wife, Anna, Lee fatally shoots him to protect Ruby. Ruth lunges at Ruby with a dagger, forcing Lee to kill her. Lee tries to destroy the doll, but her revolver misfires. She yells for an unresponsive Ruby to leave, who continues to stare at the doll.

== Cast ==
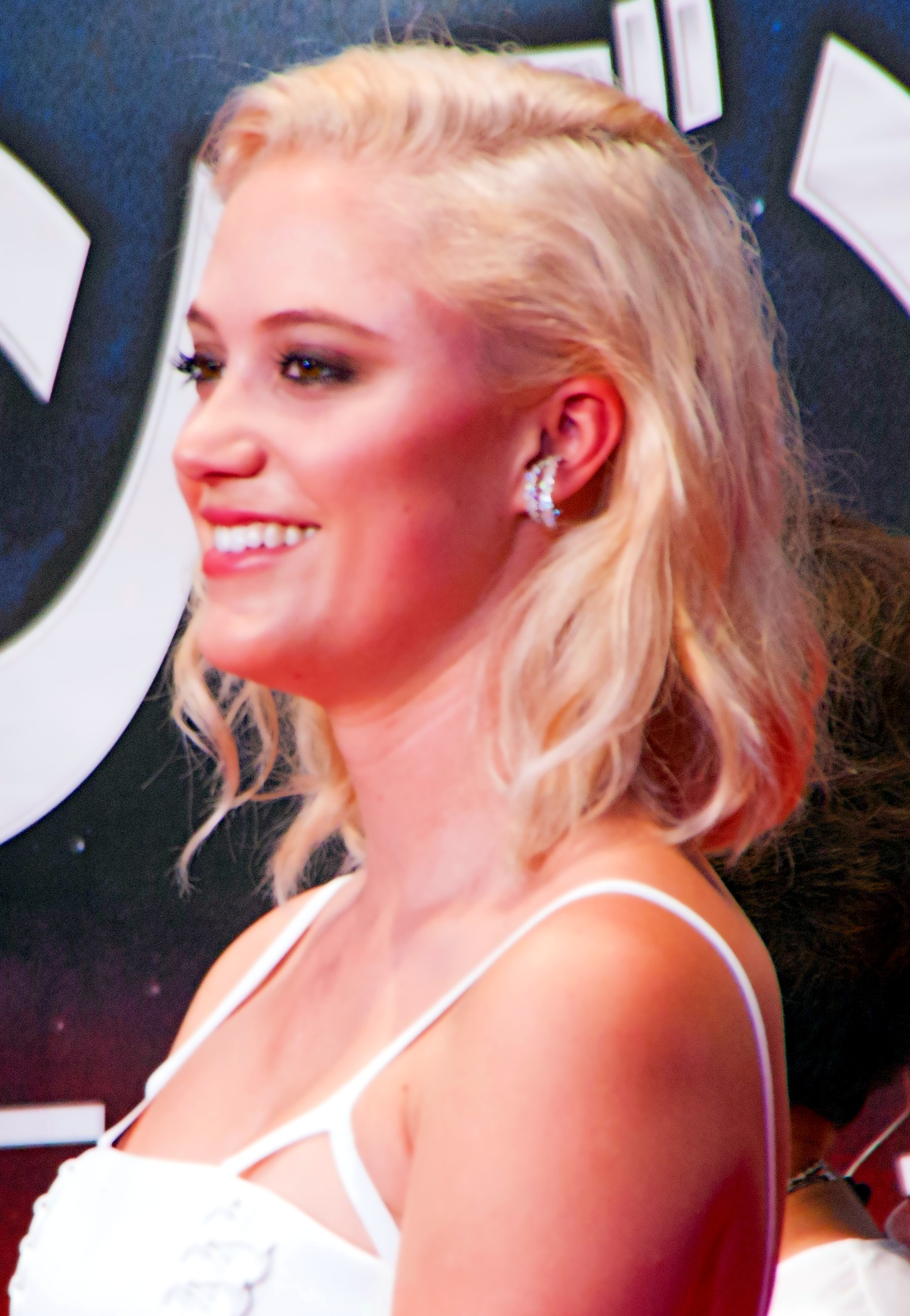
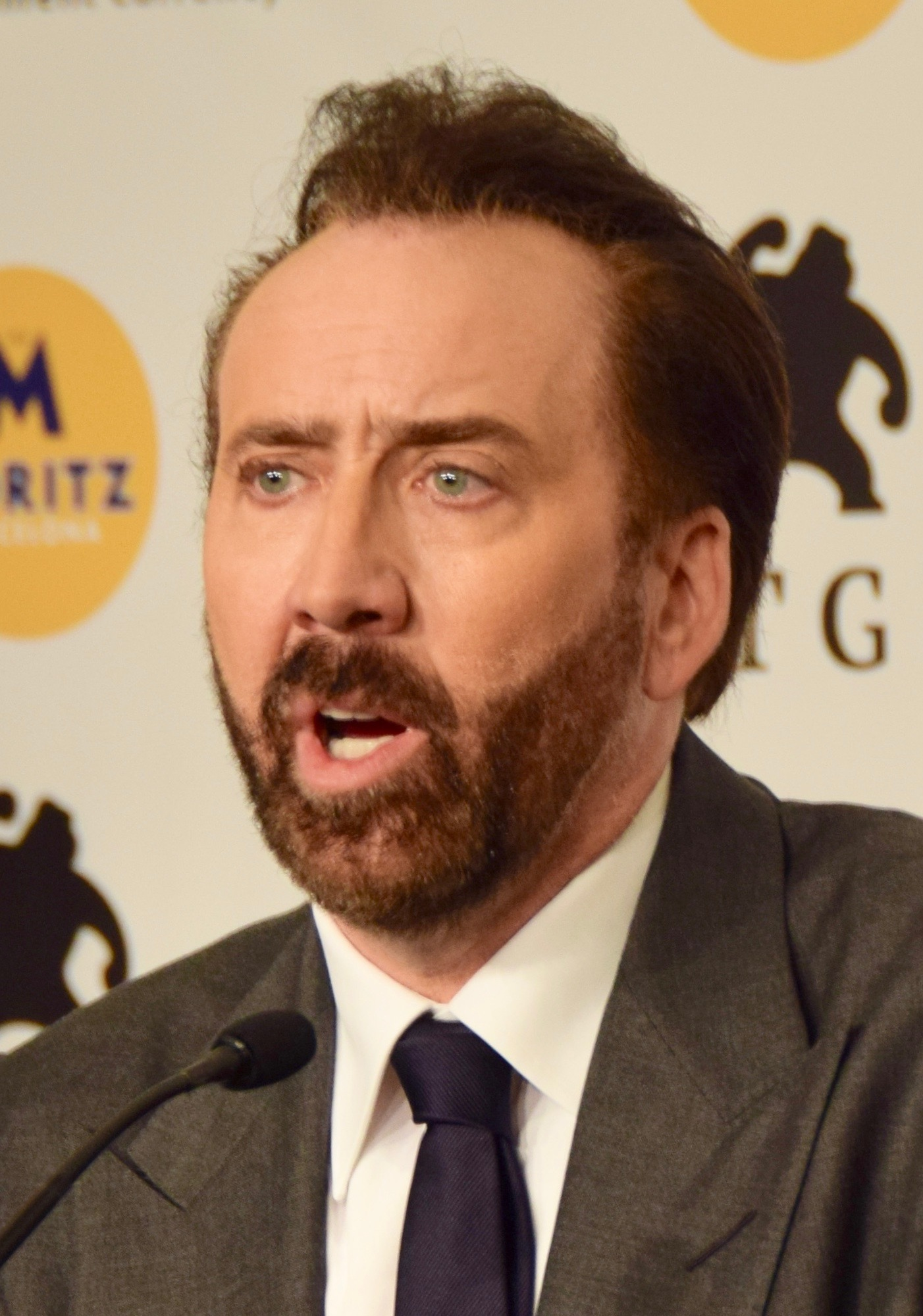
Maika Monroe stars as Lee Harker with Nicolas Cage as Longlegs
- Maika Monroe as Lee Harker, an FBI agent.
  - Lauren Acala as young Lee
- Nicolas Cage as Longlegs (also known as Dale Ferdinand Kobble), an elusive Satanic serial killer.
- Blair Underwood as Agent William Carter, one of Lee's superiors
- Alicia Witt as Ruth Harker, Lee's religious mother
- Michelle Choi-Lee as Agent Browning, one of Lee's superiors
- Dakota Daulby as Agent Fisk, Lee's partner
- Kiernan Shipka as Carrie Anne Camera, Longlegs' only known survivor
  - Maila Hosie as young Carrie
- Jason Day as Father Camera
- Lisa Chandler as Mother Camera
- Ava Kelders as Ruby Carter, William Carter's daughter
- Carmel Amit as Anna Carter, William Carter's wife
- Peter Bryant as a senior FBI agent

== Production ==
The film was announced in November 2022, with Osgood Perkins as writer and director. He drew inspiration from several sources; the plot device of the evil dolls that cause fathers to murder their families was loosely inspired by the killing of JonBenét Ramsey: "The murder took place approaching Christmas, and one present that the parents had gotten for JonBenét was a life-size replica doll of herself, wearing one of her pageant dresses. It was in a cardboard box in the basement, 15 feet from where she was killed, and there was something so insane about that, I'd cataloged it away."

Perkins told People magazine that the film was inspired by his mother's treatment towards his father Anthony Perkins' sexuality, shielding the public and the Perkins children from knowledge of his homosexual relationships. Oz Perkins was quoted, saying, "Your mother can protect you from a truth that she thinks is unsavory [...] and then you just build out a crazy movie around that."

In February 2023, Nicolas Cage and Maika Monroe came on board to star, with Cage also producing under his Saturn Films banner. In March, Alicia Witt and Blair Underwood were announced as part of the cast.

Dave Caplan's C2 Motion Picture Group financed the film for under $10 million. Principal photography was scheduled to take place in Vancouver from January 16 to February 23, 2023.

== Music ==
The film's soundtrack was conceived by Zilgi, a pseudonym for Elvis Perkins (the brother of the film's director), credited as composer of the score compositions on the digital soundtrack album. The soundtrack was released on July 12, 2024, on streaming platforms and on vinyl.

== Marketing ==
Billboard in Los Angeles containing a phone number to listen to pre-recorded messages

Neon used guerrilla marketing tactics similar to those that led to the box office success of The Blair Witch Project (1999), building speculation through clips, images, and coded messages that used symbology created for the film and concealed Cage's look as Longlegs. Eleven promotional videos were uploaded to YouTube leading up to release, the first appearing in January 2024, which did not mention the film's title until February; together, the videos accumulated 30 million views. A trailer was attached to every horror film released in theaters since January 2024.

Additional content included a billboard (with no mention of the title) that featured a phone number for pre-recorded messages from the film's antagonist, and a paid advertisement featuring a cipher that was published in the Seattle Times on June 14, a reference to the Zodiac Killer, that directed readers to an in-universe website detailing murders committed in the film. The week of the film's release, Neon released a clip allegedly of Monroe's heartrate when she first saw Cage's character. Following the film's theatrical premiere, Neon released another promotional spot highlighting hidden appearances of the devil that recur in the backgrounds of the film. According to Perkins, there are 15 appearances of the devil in the film which are not readily noticeable.

Perkins credited Neon for the film's marketing, saying the studio "asked me early on, 'Do we have your permission to kind of go nuts?' And I said, 'What else are we doing here? Go for it. Do your thing.'" The film's total marketing budget was under $10 million, focusing on using digital content over traditional television ads.

== Release ==
In February 2023, Neon acquired the film's North American rights at the European Film Market. The film had a screening at Los Angeles's Beyond Fest on May 31, 2024. Longlegs premiered at The Egyptian Theatre Hollywood in Los Angeles on July 8, 2024.

Longlegs held several special screenings across the United States throughout July 8–13, 2024. This also included a 'parent-free' RSVP screening at the Alamo Drafthouse Cinema in Brooklyn, New York on July 12, 2024. It was released in North America and the United Kingdom on July 12, 2024. Longlegs was released on VOD on August 23, 2024. The 4K Ultra HD, Blu-ray, and DVD was released on September 24, 2024.

== Reception ==
=== Box office ===
Longlegs grossed $74.3 million in the United States and Canada, and $53.6 million in other territories, for a worldwide total of $128 million. Deadline Hollywood calculated the film made a net profit of $48 million.

In the United States and Canada, Longlegs was released alongside Fly Me to the Moon, and was projected to gross $7–9 million from 2,510 theaters in its opening weekend. After making $10 million on its first day (including $3 million from Thursday night previews, both records for Neon), weekend estimates were raised to $20–23 million. It went on to debut to $22.4 million, finishing second at the box-office behind holdover Despicable Me 4. The opening marked the best opening weekend for Neon and the biggest total for an original 2024 horror film. It was Monroe's best domestic opening as lead (excluding 2016's Independence Day: Resurgence, for which she was billed) and Cage's first live-action film to open above $20 million since Ghost Rider: Spirit of Vengeance in 2012. In its second weekend, the film made $12 million, a drop of 46.6% to finish in fourth. In its third weekend, it became Neon's highest-grossing film after surpassing their earnings for 2019's Parasite ($53.37 million) and added $6.8 million. On August 16, 2024, the film had surpassed $100 million worldwide, making it the highest-grossing independent film of the year to date.

=== Critical response ===
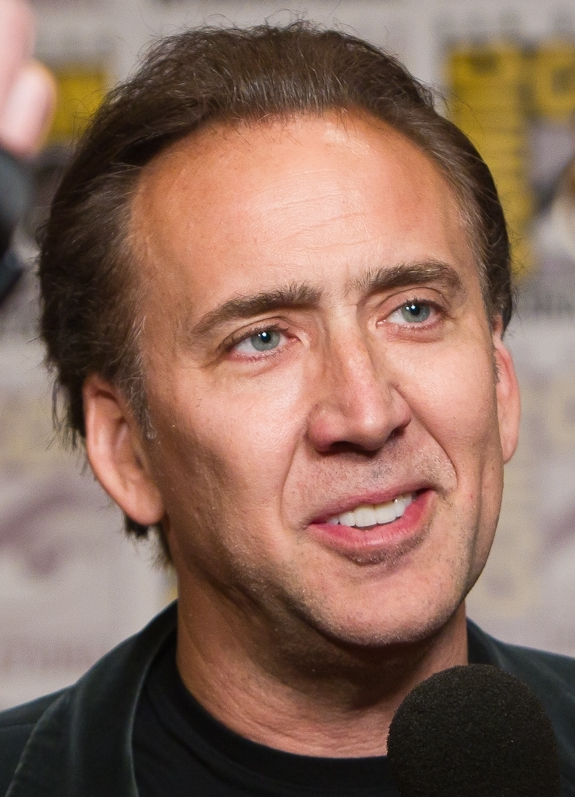
Critics praised Nicolas Cage's performance.

The film premiered to critical acclaim. (Note: Multiple references:) On the review aggregator website Rotten Tomatoes, 85% of 323 critics' reviews are positive, with an average rating of 7.6/10. The website's consensus reads: "Saturated in disquieting mood while leveraging a nightmarishly gonzo performance by Nicolas Cage, Longlegs is a satanic horror that effectively instills panic." Metacritic, which uses a weighted average, assigned the film a score of 77 out of 100, based on 52 critics, indicating "generally favorable" reviews.

David Rooney writing for The Hollywood Reporter praised the film, saying, "It might be argued that he stirs too many elements into the mix here—crime procedural, occult mystery, mind manipulation, Satanic worship, scary dolls, a Faustian bargain and a 'nun' not fit for any convent. But Longlegs is [Perkins'] most fully realized and relentlessly effective film to date". Bob Strauss of the San Francisco Chronicle wrote, "Most impressive is how Perkins blends psychological and supernatural horror in a manner not quite seen before. Longlegs is a conjuring of dark, poetic cinema where the devil is definitely in the details". Vanity Fair's Richard Lawson expressed disappointment in the film, writing "Longlegs is stylish but vacuous, a prettily foreboding picture with nothing behind it. As Hannibal Lecter might say, it's a well scrubbed, hustling rube with a little taste".

J. Hurtado of ScreenAnarchy declared Longlegs "a masterpiece; an unholy, horrifying confluence of high art and anxiety, a film in which every frame is a nightmare, and it's beautiful". Writing for Bloody Disgusting, Meagan Navarro praised Longlegs' performances and atmosphere, concluding, "Longlegs is as stylish as it is timeless, dripping with claustrophobic dread and rot." Bill Bria of /Film called Longlegs "the most terrifying horror movie of 2024", noting the film's "rock n' roll spirit".

=== Audience reception ===
Audiences polled by CinemaScore gave the film an average grade of "C+" on an A+ to F scale. Those polled by PostTrak gave it a 70% overall positive score, with an average 3 out of 5 stars.

A correspondent of LGBT magazine Them made note of how some audience members perceived the characterization of the film's villain to be homophobic or transphobic due to the character's androgynous characteristics. A CNN opinion piece accused the film of transphobia, comparing Longlegs to Buffalo Bill of The Silence of the Lambs, and emphasizing the horror genre's complicated history of LGBT themes.

In a Reddit AMA interview with director Oz Perkins, a fan inquired if the writing of Longlegs was intended to be a negative portrayal of a transgender person. Perkins responded by denouncing anti-trans behavior, but did not specifically elaborate about any element of the film.

Director Guillermo Del Toro complimented the film, praising "[Perkins'] metronome, his meticulous composition and his uncanny sense of evil and impending doom." Paul Schrader commented on the film on social media, questioning why directors like Perkins and Ti West were "confined to the horror genre ghetto."

=== Accolades ===
Award	Date of ceremony	Category	Recipient(s)	Result	Ref.
Astra Film Awards	December 8, 2024	Best Horror or Thriller Feature	Longlegs	Nominated	
Clio Entertainment Awards	November 14, 2024	Theatrical: Audio Visual Campaign	"Longlegs Audio Visual Campaign" by AV Squad	Won	
Clio Entertainment Awards	November 14, 2024	Theatrical: Audio Visual Craft	"Dark" by AV Squad	Won	
Clio Entertainment Awards	November 14, 2024	Theatrical: Integrated Campaign	"Longlegs Integrated Campaign" by Neon	Won	
Clio Entertainment Awards	November 14, 2024	Theatrical: Spot	"Heartbeat" by AV Squad	Won	
Clio Entertainment Awards	November 14, 2024	Theatrical: Teaser	"Dirty" by AV Squad	Won	
Critics' Choice Super Awards	August 7, 2025	Best Horror Movie	Longlegs	Nominated	
Critics' Choice Super Awards	August 7, 2025	Best Actor in a Horror Movie	Nicolas Cage	Nominated	
Fangoria Chainsaw Awards	October 2025	Best Wide Release	Longlegs	Nominated	
Fangoria Chainsaw Awards	October 2025	Best Director	Osgood Perkins	Nominated	
Fangoria Chainsaw Awards	October 2025	Best Lead Performance	Maika Monroe	Nominated	
Fangoria Chainsaw Awards	October 2025	Best Supporting Performance	Nicolas Cage	Won	
Fangoria Chainsaw Awards	October 2025	Best Cinematography	Andres Arochi	Nominated	
Fangoria Chainsaw Awards	October 2025	Best Score	Zilgi	Nominated	
Fangoria Chainsaw Awards	October 2025	Best Makeup FX	Felix Fox, Harlow MacFarlane, and Werner Pretorius	Nominated	
Golden Trailer Awards	May 29, 2025	Best Horror TV Spot (for a Feature Film)	"Meeting" by Neon / AV Squad	Won	
Golden Trailer Awards	May 29, 2025	Best Horror/Thriller TrailerByte for a Feature Film	"Let Him In" by Black Bear / Ignition Creative London	Nominated	
Hollywood Music in Media Awards	November 20, 2024	Best Original Score – Horror/Thriller Film	Zilgi	Nominated	
Saturn Awards	February 2, 2025	Best Horror Film	Longlegs	Nominated	
Saturn Awards	February 2, 2025	Best Supporting Actor in a Film	Nicolas Cage	Nominated	
Saturn Awards	February 2, 2025	Best Film Screenwriting	Osgood Perkins	Won	
Saturn Awards	February 2, 2025	Best Film Make Up	Felix Fox and Madelaine Hermans	Nominated	
Saturn Awards	February 2, 2025	Best Film Production Design	Danny Vermette	Nominated	
Seattle Film Critics Society	December 16, 2024	Villain of the Year	Longlegs (as portrayed by Nicolas Cage)	Nominated	
St. Louis Film Critics Association	December 15, 2024	Best Horror Film	Longlegs	Nominated	

== Future ==
In April 2026, it was announced that a new film in the Longlegs universe was in the works, with Perkins returning to write and direct, and Cage reprising his role. Paramount Pictures took over distribution rights from Neon. The film is set to be released on January 14, 2028.

== See also ==
- List of horror films of 2024

== Bibliography ==
- Adrian Gmelch (2026). Poetry and Horror: The Films of Osgood Perkins. Create Space. ISBN 9798177116808.
