= Osgood Perkins =

American filmmaker and actor (born 1974)

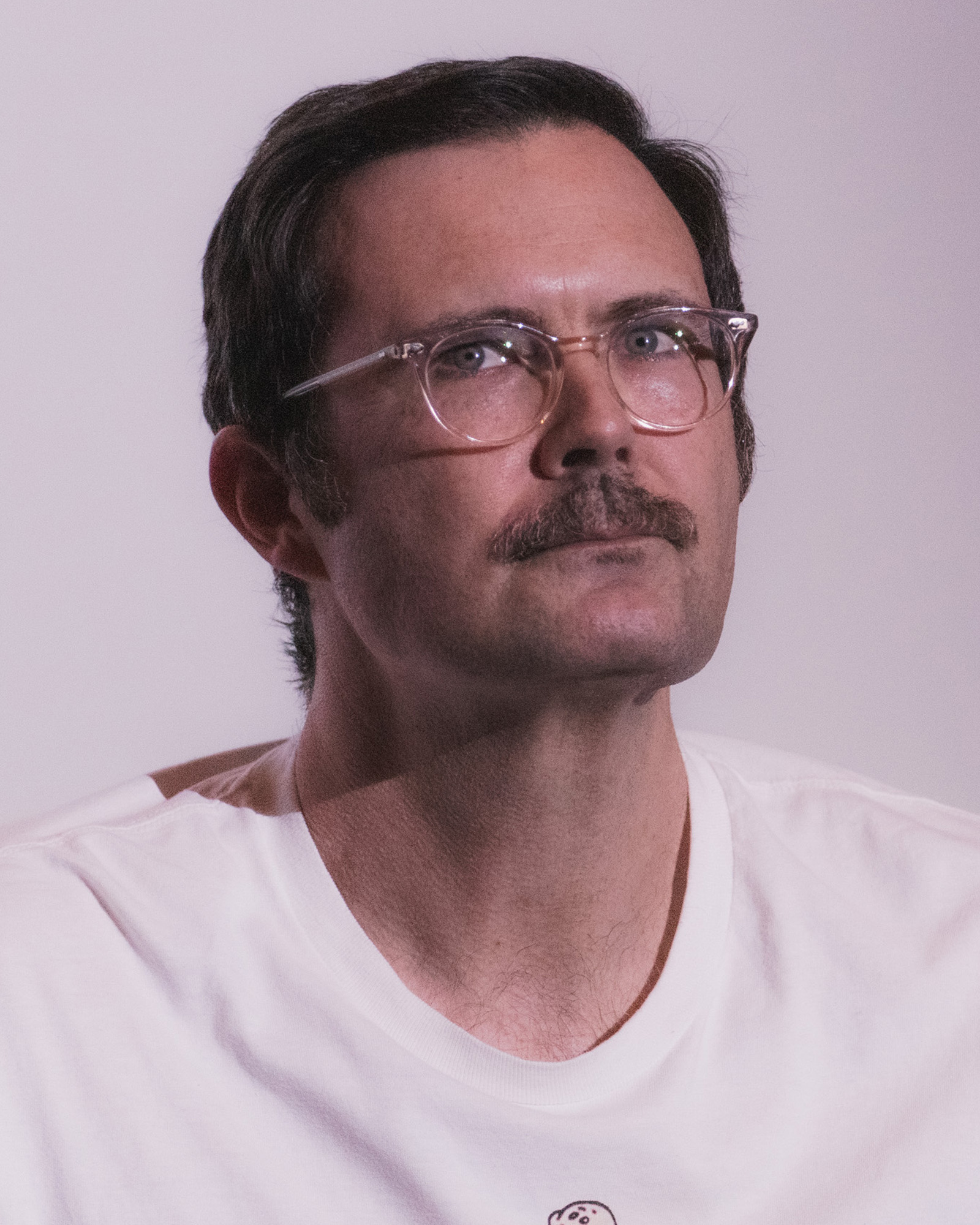
- Perkins in 2025
- Born: Osgood Robert Perkins II; February 2, 1974 (age 52); New York City, U.S.
- Other name: Oz Perkins
- Occupations: Film director; screenwriter; producer; actor
- Years active: 1983–present
- Spouse: Sidney Perkins (m. 1999; div. 2016)
- Children: 3
- Parents: Anthony Perkins (father); Berry Berenson (mother)
- Relatives: Elvis Perkins (brother); Osgood Perkins (grandfather); Marisa Berenson (aunt); Elsa Schiaparelli (great-grandmother)

Osgood Robert Perkins II (born February 2, 1974) is an American filmmaker and actor. Since the 2010s, he directed the horror films The Blackcoat's Daughter (2015), I Am the Pretty Thing That Lives in the House (2016), Gretel & Hansel (2020), Longlegs (2024), The Monkey and Keeper (both in 2025).

He began his career as a child actor, portraying the young version of his father Anthony Perkins's character Norman Bates in Psycho II (1983), and later appeared in films such as Six Degrees of Separation (1993), Legally Blonde (2001), Not Another Teen Movie (2001), Star Trek (2009), and Nope (2022).

== Early life ==
Osgood Robert Perkins II was born in the Manhattan borough of New York City on February 2, 1974, the son of actress Berry Berenson (1948–2001) and actor Anthony Perkins (1932–1992). He is the older brother of musician Elvis Perkins, the grandson of actor Osgood Perkins, and the nephew of actress Marisa Berenson. Perkins's parents remained married until his father, who had long struggled with his sexual orientation, died of AIDS in September 1992.

Perkins's mother had French, Italian, Polish-Jewish, Russian-Jewish, and Swiss ancestry, and was a descendant of astronomer Giovanni Schiaparelli and fashion designer Elsa Schiaparelli. She was a passenger on American Airlines Flight 11 and subsequently died in the September 11 attacks. His father was of English descent and counted wood engraver Andrew Varick Stout Anthony and colonist Roger Conant among his ancestors, as well as Mayflower passengers William Brewster, John Howland, and Myles Standish.

== Career ==
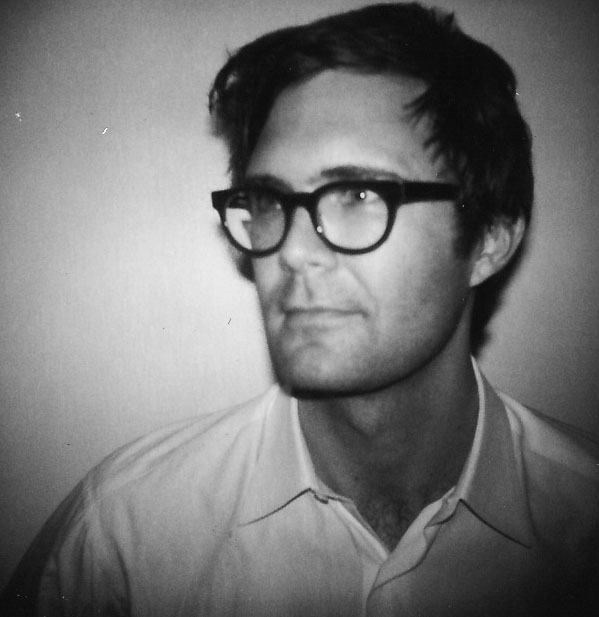
Perkins in 2009

Perkins's first acting role was in Psycho II (1983), in which he briefly appeared as the 12-year-old version of his father's character Norman Bates. He has since appeared in the films Six Degrees of Separation (1993), Legally Blonde (2001), Not Another Teen Movie (2001), Secretary (2002), La Cucina (2007), Star Trek (2009), and Nope (2022), as well as episodes of Alias and other television shows. He was featured in the second episode of the Shudder documentary miniseries Queer for Fear: The History of Queer Horror (2022), in which he discussed the legacy of his father's role as Norman Bates in Psycho (1960) and its sequels.

Perkins made his directorial debut with the horror film The Blackcoat's Daughter (2015) and has since become known for writing and/or directing horror films such as The Girl in the Photographs (2015), I Am the Pretty Thing That Lives in the House (2016), Gretel & Hansel (2020), Longlegs (2024), The Monkey (2025), and Keeper (2025). Perkins credits his father's career with influencing his own approach to the horror genre. As a teenager, Perkins felt that his father was relegated to appearing in "bad horror movies". This led him to perceive the horror genre as having a "love-hate, push-pull, respect-degrading quality", and to make "some off-balance, off-center things".

In May 2025, Perkins co-founded the production company Phobos with producer Chris Ferguson. Perkins and the company signed a first-look deal with Neon.

== Personal life ==
Perkins married Sidney in 1999, and they had a son and daughter together before divorcing in 2016. He also has a son from a subsequent relationship.

== Filmography ==
=== Film ===
Year	Title	Functioned as			Notes
Year	Title	Director	Writer	Producer	Notes
2015	The Blackcoat's Daughter	Yes	Yes	No	
2016	I Am the Pretty Thing That Lives in the House	Yes	Yes	No	
2020	Gretel & Hansel	Yes	No	No	
2024	Longlegs	Yes	Yes	No	
2025	The Monkey	Yes	Yes	No	
2025	Keeper	Yes	No	No	
TBA	The Young People †	Yes	Yes	Yes	Post-production

==== Writer only ====
- Removal (2010)
- Cold Comes the Night (2013)
- The Girl in the Photographs (2015)

==== Producer only ====
- Backrooms (2026)
- 4 X 4: The Event (TBA) - In post-production

==== Acting roles ====
Year	Title	Role	Notes
1983	Psycho II	Young Norman Bates	
1993	Six Degrees of Separation	Woody	
1994	Wolf	Cop	
2001	Legally Blonde	David Kidney	
2001	Not Another Teen Movie	Uninterested Guy	
2002	Secretary	Jonathan	
2003	Quigley	Guardian Angel Sweeney	
2004	Dead & Breakfast	Johnny	
2005	Erosion	Steve	
2006	The Utah Murder Project	Det. Charlie DeSantis	
2007	La Cucina	Chris	
2009	Star Trek	USS Enterprise Comms Officer	
2010	Removal	Henry Sharpe	
2014	Electric Slide	Andy Segal	
2017	78/52: Hitchcock's Shower Scene	Himself	Documentary
2022	Nope	Fynn Bachman	
2025	The Monkey	Chip Zimmer	

=== Television ===
Year	Title	Functioned as		Notes
Year	Title	Director	Writer	Notes
2020	The Twilight Zone	Yes	Yes	Episode: "You Might Also Like"

==== Acting roles ====
Year	Title	Role	Notes
2002	She Spies	Karg	Episode: "The Martini Shot"
2005	Alias	Coke Bottle Glasses	Episodes: "Mirage" and "A Clean Conscience"
2006	Close to Home	Charlie Forsberg	Episode: "Dead or Alive"
2008	October Road	Dr. Joshua Stone	Episode: "The Fine Art of Surfacing"
2020	The Twilight Zone	Kanamit #2	Episode: "You Might Also Like"
2022	Queer for Fear: The History of Queer Horror	Himself (interviewee)	Docuseries

== Bibliography ==
- Adrian Gmelch (2026). Poetry and Horror: The Films of Osgood Perkins. Create Space. ISBN 9798177116808.
