= Cymbal-banging monkey toy =

Mechanical toy

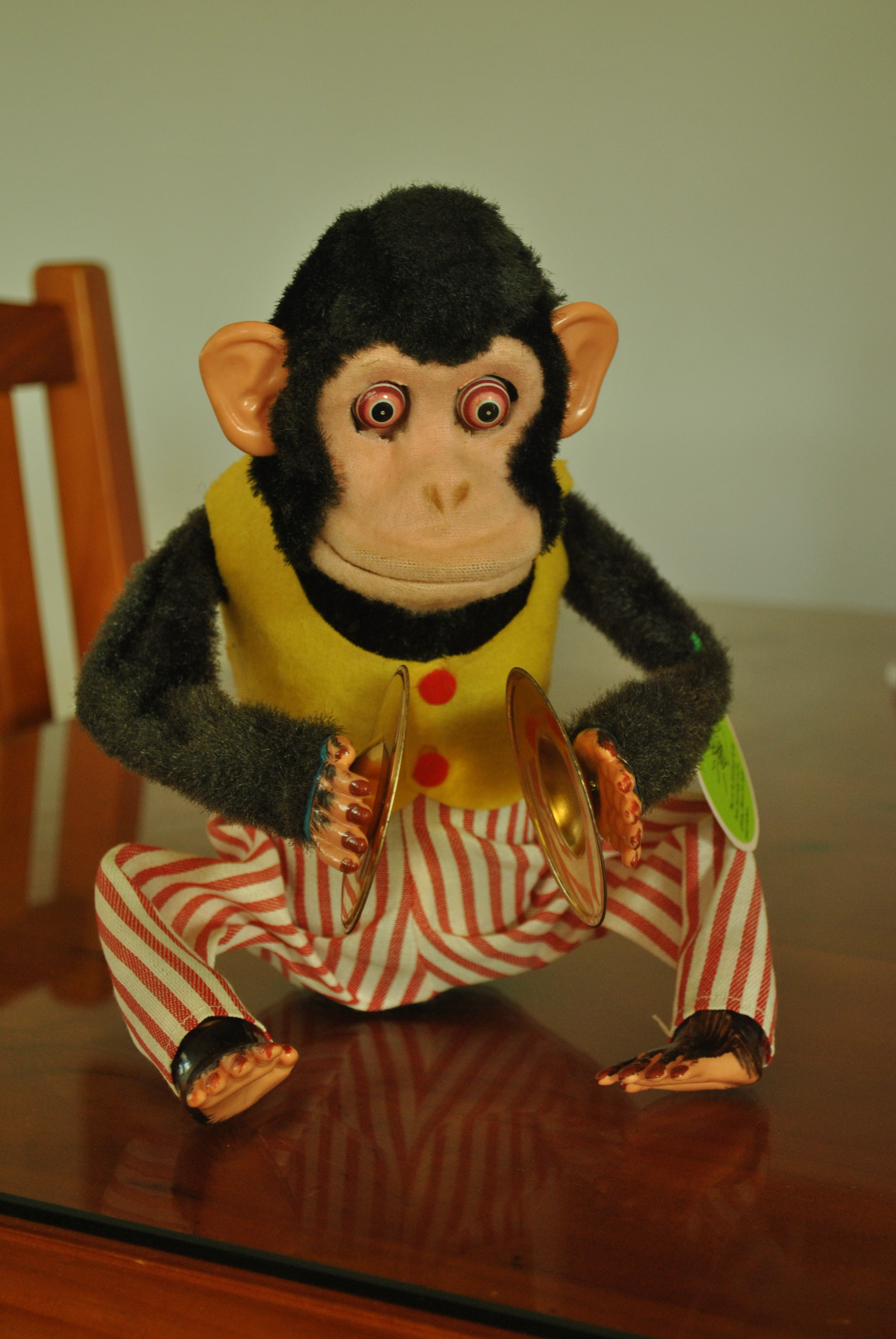
- A battery-operated musical jolly chimp manufactured by Kuramochi Company
- Type: Mechanical toy
- Company: Louis Marx & Co.
- Country: United States
- Availability: 1930s–present

A cymbal-banging monkey toy (also known as Jolly Chimp) is a mechanical depiction of a chimpanzee holding a cymbal in each hand. When activated it repeatedly bangs its cymbals together and, in some cases, bobs its head, chatters, screeches, grins, and more. There are both traditional wind-up versions and updated battery-operated cymbal-banging monkeys. The cymbal-banging monkey toy is an example of singerie and kitsch.

== History ==
The earliest documented toy of a monkey banging cymbals is "Hoppo the Waltzing Monkey" by Louis Marx & Co. in 1932. The trope of a monkey using cymbals to perform dates back to organ grinders using Capuchin monkeys as part of their performances. Around 1954, a toy using the same concept named Musical Chimp was produced by the Japanese company Alps. A variety of toys using the same concept were offered over the next decade by companies such as Russ and Yano Man Toys. In 1972, advertisements started appearing for a toy named "Jumbo Jolly Chimp" or "Musical Jolly Chimp". Musical Jolly Chimp was originally released as "わんぱくスージー" ("Naughty Susie") in Japan and manufactured by Kuramochi Company in partnership with Daishin in the United States and Bandai in Japan. Musical Jolly Chimp was battery operated and would bug its eyes out and screech when hit on the head. Its chest was often constructed from recycled tin from food packaging. This specific design was featured in a variety of entertainment such as the introduction of Close Encounters of the Third Kind (1977), How the Grinch Stole Christmas (2000), Ape Escape 2 (2002), and Toy Story 3 (2010). This design has switched companies over time as well as had changes to its appearance; its most recent iteration is Yamani's "Curious Cymbal-kun".
