= The Exit 8 =

2023 video game

- Logo
- Developer: Kotake Create (Note: MyDearest Inc. co-developed the VR version.)
- Publishers: Kotake Create (Note: Kotake Create originally published the PC version prior to Playism's involvement); Playism; MyDearest Inc. (VR version)
- Engine: Unreal Engine 5
- Platforms: Android; iOS; Meta Quest; Microsoft Windows; Nintendo Switch; Nintendo Switch 2; PlayStation 4; PlayStation 5; Xbox Series X/S
- Release: The Exit 8; 29 November 2023: Microsoft Windows; 29 November 2023; Nintendo Switch; 17 April 2024; PS4, PS5; 8 August 2024; Xbox Series X/S; 9 January 2025; iOS; 28 March 2025; Android; 31 March 2025; Nintendo Switch 2; 29 August 2025; The Exit 8 VR; 11 July 2024: Meta Quest; 11 July 2024; Microsoft Windows; 19 September 2024
- Genres: Adventure game, Psychological horror, Walking sim
- Mode: Single-player

The Exit 8, (Note: Japanese: 8番出口, Hepburn: Hachiban Deguchi) sometimes shortened to Exit 8, is a 2023 indie adventure game developed and published by Kotake Create (stylised in all caps), also known as Kotakenotokeke. Billed as a walking simulator, the game revolves around the player walking through a Japanese metro station passageway, trying to spot inaccuracies, referred to as anomalies, in the layout of the passageway to reach the exit of the station. The game was initially released on Steam on 29 November 2023 and was subsequently ported to Nintendo Switch, PlayStation 4 and PlayStation 5 in 2024, and on Xbox Series X/S, iOS, Android and Nintendo Switch 2 in 2025 under the Japanese indie publisher Playism. A virtual reality version co-developed and published by MyDearest Inc., dubbed The Exit 8 VR, was released on 11 July 2024 for the Meta Quest 2, Pro and 3 and later made available on Steam and the Quest 3S.

The Exit 8 took nine months to develop and was designed to be made in a short amount of time and on a low budget, as Kotake felt another game he was making at the time had too long of a development cycle. The game was inspired by the "surreal" atmosphere of underground passageways and the concept of liminal spaces; the Finnish horror game series I'm on Observation Duty also played a key part in the creation of the game, as it inspired the game's anomaly mechanic. The setting was modelled after several Japanese metro stations, including a station in Osaka and the Kiyosumi-shirakawa Station in Kōtō, Tokyo.

The Exit 8 received positive reviews, with many critics praising the game for its psychological horror and realistic environment, although critiqued the game for its short length and lack of replayability. The VR version received similarly positive reception. The game was nominated for many awards, winning at both the Japan Game Awards and the CEDEC Awards. Additionally, the game has received over 3 million downloads. In the wake of the game's release, various games released that took heavy inspiration from Exit 8 and were subsequently dubbed "Exit 8-likes". A successor to the game called Platform 8 was released on 31 May 2024. (Note: In Platform 8's hidden ending, it is revealed that Platform 8 is a direct prequel to The Exit 8.) A live-action film adaptation of the game was released on 29 August 2025 in Japan, and on 10 April 2026 in the United States.

== Gameplay ==
The passageway the game is set in with no anomaly (left). The passageway with an anomaly—the walls, floor and ceiling are plastered with "No Smoking" signs (right).

The Exit 8 is a first-person three-dimensional (3D) walking simulator type game with elements of puzzle and psychological horror. Inspired by the concept of liminal spaces such as the Backrooms, the game is set in a passageway of the Japanese metro. At the start of the game, the rules are displayed on a sign on the wall next to the player, with the player starting at Exit 0. Every time the player exits the passageway, the passageway seems to repeat seemingly forever with even a walking commuter appearing to be caught in the loop. The core gameplay of The Exit 8 is similar to games like spot the difference, where the player must look out for and identify anomalies in the room's layout. If there are no anomalies, the player should proceed down the corridor; whereas if there is an anomaly, the player should turn around and walk the way they came in order to progress to the next exit. The player needs to be correct eight times in a row to reach the final exit, Exit 8, to leave the station. Should the player be incorrect with the assessment of a given room layout, their progress will reset back to Exit 0.

Anomalies in the game can range from subtle differences such as different messages on signs, repeating poster designs, proportion differences with the commuter, to more evident anomalies like power outages. Certain anomalies can actually reset the player's progress should they not turn back quick enough, such as a flood of red water, or a man camouflaged as the wall tiles that will chase after the player if they get too close. Some anomalies are exclusive to different versions of the game such as the VR version. Upon the release of the Nintendo Switch 2 version, a new anomaly was added to pay homage to the film adaptation; the anomaly was also added to the PC and Nintendo Switch versions the same day via an update.

== Development and release ==
=== Development ===
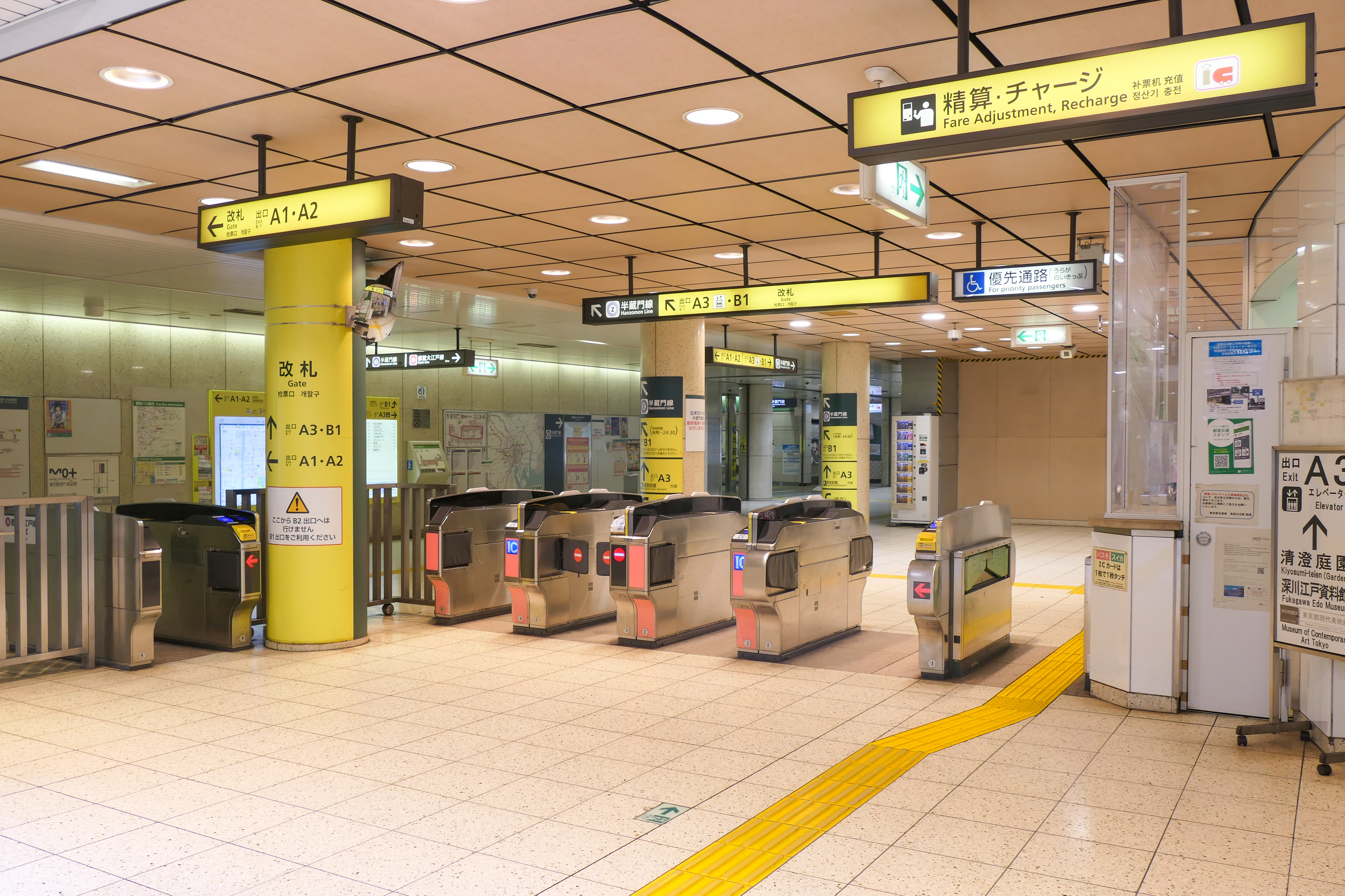
A picture of Kiyosumi-shirakawa Station, a location many players have compared to the passageway in the game

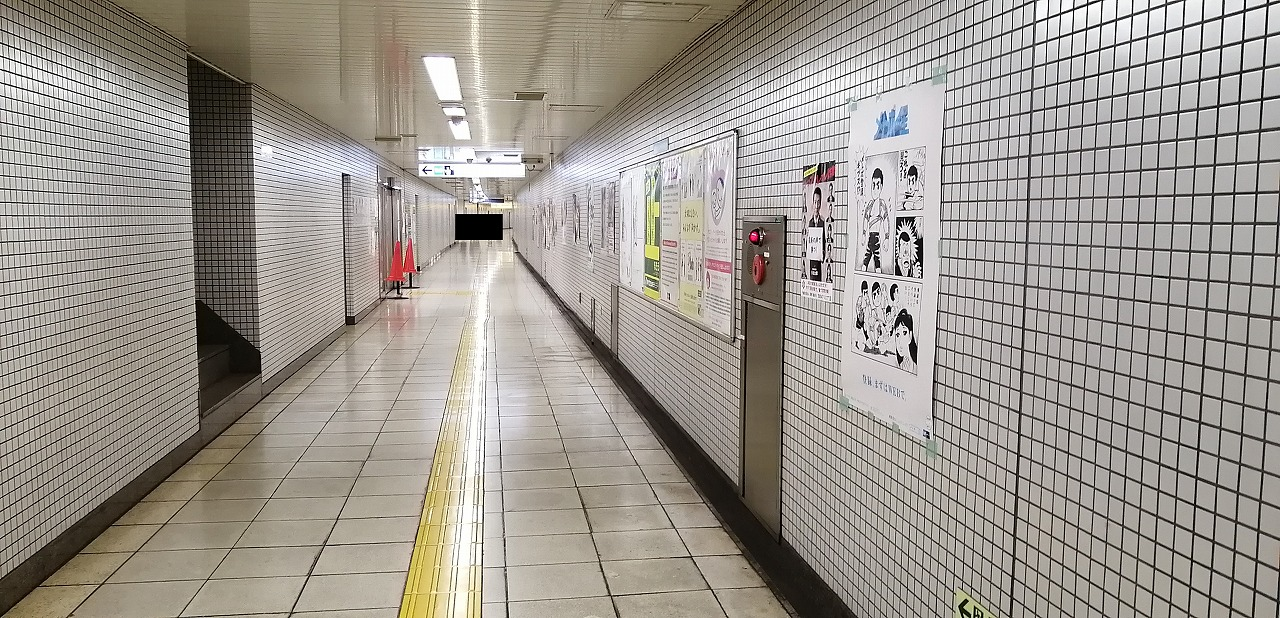
A picture of an underground passageway within Nogizaka Station, another station used as a comparison

The Exit 8 was developed by Japanese indie developer Kotake Create, also known as Kotakenotokeke, who developed the game in Unreal Engine 5. He previously worked for four years as a 3D artist at a Japanese game developer before leaving the company to work on games as a solo developer. Whilst holding a session at Indie Developers Conference 2024, Kotake laid out three reasons as to why he developed The Exit 8; wanting to release a game on Steam, wanting to make a game in a shorter time span as another game he was working on called Strange Shadows was taking a long time, and wanting to make a game that would sell in order to finance living expenses and development. Elsewhere, he also expressed that he had a desire to make games set in underground passageways. In an interview with Japanese website Game Makers, Kotake stated that the game took over nine months to develop, split between six months of planning and prototyping and three months of final development.

In the initial concept for the game, the player would have been able to board a subway train. However, due to development restraints, the concept was dropped to just the corridor setting; the train aspects were later reused as the setting for The Exit 8's sequel. Kotake stated that he liked the surreal atmosphere of confined spaces such as underground passageways, which inspired him to create a game based on loops. Another influence for the looping mechanic during development was the 2021 adventure game Twelve Minutes, which featured a mechanic where the events of the game would loop after twelve minutes. In light of being asked why he chose the number 8 for the game's title, Kotake responded in a tweet that he chose the number casually and just felt that number was just right, though he also stated that he associated 8 with the concept of infinity which linked to the idea of loops. Kotake outlined that the looping mechanic became a difficult part of the development cycle, but it was resolved by creating two passageways with the same structure that would become connected when the player's route activates a trigger that moves the passageways together.

The main inspiration for The Exit 8 came from I'm on Observation Duty, a 2018 horror game created by Finnish developer Notovia based on surveillance cameras and finding anomalies, which made him realise that spot the difference could integrate well with horror themes. A core reason Kotake chose to use this game as a reference was to align with the goal of making a profitable game in a short time, mentioning that the genre had untapped market potential and could be created in a short time, adding that "'spot the difference game with a horror feel' seemed like fun to make." Additionally the mechanic of security camera footage reminded him of a looping video, another influence for the looping mechanic. However, to differentiate Exit 8 with Observation Duty, Kotake created the game with a first-person perspective and implemented a mechanic for the player to point out anomalies. During the testing for the game, Kotake was a part of an incubation program for indie developers named iGi (indie Game incubator) run by Marvelous, in which he asked other developers to playtest a prototype for the game during a program-run showcase event. The prototype originally had the player run back to the sign at the beginning of the passageway and then make a U-turn to continue forward when spotting an anomaly. However, due to feedback from friends and iGi testers, the mechanic was changed so the new passageway would load when just turning back to the beginning.

Another way Kotake tried to differentiate the game was by changing the setting from a room to a corridor, specifically inside underground passages and subways. One of the more difficult aspects of developing the game was creating the visuals of the passageway. Kotake devised a workflow of using photos taken by him to create 3D models as well as using assets from a variety of websites such as the MetaHuman Creator, Pixabay and the UE Marketplace, making a policy during development to use store assets where possible. Following questions made by BuzzFeed Japan and Game Makers, Kotake mentioned that the hallway the game is set in was modelled after a real location, although declined to name the station in question to avoid causing the station trouble. Speaking further, he mentioned that an art installation in Kiyosumi-shirakawa Station directly inspired one of the anomalies in the game. The art installation in-question are diagonal ceiling lights randomly scattered across the ceiling of a hallway which is meant to "resemble the hustle and bustle going on above the ground". In August 2025, Kotake revealed the game was originally modelled after a station in Osaka, of which the station's passageway was one he previously travelled through daily to get to school.

When making the anomalies for the game, Kotake stated he wanted to keep the anomalies at "borderline horror" and "unsettling", citing anomaly inspiration stemming from works such as P.T. and The Shining. During development of the game, early concepts on how to deal with the anomalies included taking pictures of the anomalies using a camera or shooting the anomalies with a gun, which Kotake believed did not match the game's setting. Additionally, due to wanting to keep the development of the game short and low budget, he opted instead to incorporate the "proceed or turn back" mechanic. During development, the "red water" anomaly caused some difficulties to implement. To resolve the issue, Kotake created a static mesh that would follow the structure of the pathway and used a shader to gradually reveal the mesh to create the illusion that the water was flowing. When asked about how the game was developed with simplicity in mind, Kotake mentioned that it was likely a build-up of his feelings and experiences from his 7–8 years as an indie developer, although stated he was conscious of games he likes such as Inside, noting its lack of tutorial.

=== Release ===
To promote the game, Kotake created an X account in response to receiving "a flood of emails" requesting a Steam CD key. The game was first announced on 3 November 2023 with a trailer posted on the X account, with the release planned for later that month in both Japanese and English. According to Kotake, the announcement tweet had been retweeted 24,000 times; a significant increase from previous tweets, which he credited to good timing within the day as well as good use of key words within the trailer. The trailer, which Kotake designed to be eerie such as by excluding text and logos, was created with guidance from a video and an article on note.com. Following the trailer, the game went from a Steam wishlist count of 5,600 to under 40,000. Initially, the game was planned to release on 30 November 2023, however, he completed development of the game ahead of schedule and decided to bump the release to the day prior.

The Exit 8 would release worldwide on Steam on 29 November 2023. A few days after release, Kotake Create would release a patch for the game to fix an exploit that allowed the player to glitch to the end of the game in under one minute. The debugging phase was met with some difficulties as it was found to be hard to determine whether any complaints that mentioned the passageway resetting despite no anomalies detected were true or just the player overlooking an anomaly. During the Japanese broadcast of a Nintendo Indie World presentation on 17 April 2024, the game was announced for the Nintendo Switch and subsequently released worldwide the same day. This version of the game was published by Japanese publishing company Playism. Playism would later announce and release versions of the game for PlayStation 4 and PlayStation 5 on 8 August 2024. According to Kotake, outsourcing the development of the game was difficult as it took time to explain and gain an understanding on what development areas needed to be adjusted.

In August 2024, a physical bundle containing both The Exit 8 and its sequel, Platform 8, was announced to be releasing on 28 November 2024. In January 2025, Playism announced and released the game for Xbox Series X/S. On 28 March 2025, Playism announced the versions of the game for Android and iOS devices, with iOS releasing same day and Android later releasing on 31 March. A version for Nintendo Switch 2 was released on 29 August 2025. This version, dubbed "The Exit 8 Nintendo Switch 2 Edition", could also be upgraded from the original Switch version via an upgrade pack. This version featured improved resolution and frame rate, as well as new anomalies in commemoration of the release of the film adaptation. The anomalies was also added to the PC and Switch versions on the same day, with plans for it to be added to other platforms at a later date. In December 2025, these extra anomalies were added to the other versions via the "New Anomaly Update".

The logo for The Exit 8 VR

In early June 2024, Japanese virtual reality developer and publisher MyDearest Inc. announced a VR version of the game, called The Exit 8 VR, for the Meta Quest line of headsets. Following the announcement, a demo for the game was on display at the Miyashita Park shopping complex for the "Yojohan Miyashita Park by Meta Quest 3" VR/MR demo event that lasted from 7 June to 7 July that year. The game released on 11 July 2024 for the Meta Quest 2, Pro and 3. To commemorate the launch of the VR version, a world inspired by the game was launched for the online virtual world platform VRChat. Released in late-September 2024, the world acted as a demo for the main game and allowed players to obtain avatars based on anomalies. A second world, released the following month, allowed players to take photos in the world, such as with the NPC passer-by. In September 2024, MyDearest released this version onto Steam with support for SteamVR. The game was later made compatible for the Meta Quest 3S.

=== Successor ===
The logo for Platform 8

In an interview with Japanese website Game*Spark following the release of The Exit 8, Kotake mentioned the possibility of creating a sequel to the game, stating that he would rather make a new game instead of updating the original with new anomalies. In a subsequent interview with Game Makers, Kotake Create mentioned that he was considering soliciting real-world advertisements as opposed to the fictional advertisements seen in Exit 8 to "reduce the operating costs". This would later be added upon in late-February 2024, where the developer sent an announcement on their Twitter account that he would be accepting submissions for these guest advertisements to appear in a sequel to The Exit 8. These advertisement spots would later be filled in by brands such as "ZONe Energy". In the following month, Kotake launched a Steam page for the sequel under the name Platform 8, with a release window of between "the end of April or beginning of May". Unlike its predecessor, Platform 8 is set on a train that never ends, where the player must spot anomalies to escape the train. The game released on Steam worldwide on 31 May 2024. A Nintendo Switch port was announced in August 2024 for 28 November later the same year.

Following the release of Platform 8, Kotake Create stated that he did not want to make any more sequels in this series, feeling that he was satisfied with the games and wanted to continue working on Strange Shadow, the horror adventure game which Kotake paused development on to instead develop The Exit 8, planned for 2025. In November 2025, Kotake announced that Strange Shadow would be renamed to Pale Dots and that the release of the game would be indefinitely delayed due to development issues.

== Reception ==
=== Critical reception ===
Reception

Aggregate score
Aggregator	Score
OpenCritic	67/100; 56% recommend (Note: Score based on 9 reviews)

Review scores
Publication	Score
Nintendo Life	NS2: 7/10
Siliconera	NS: 7/10; VR: 8/10
The Escapist	VR: Recommended

==== Original version ====
According to review aggregator website OpenCritic, The Exit 8 received an average score of 67/100 based on 9 reviews, and 56% of critics recommended the game.

Many critics praised The Exit 8 for its use of psychological horror in both the game's setting and how it could affect the player. Jordan Helm from Hardcore Gamer commented on how the game utilised discomfort to create uncertainty and distrust in what the player may be witnessing. Describing this as the game's "greatest stride", Helm wrote about how the game made binary decision-making stressful due to one wrong decision causing a reset of the player's entire progress, which would cause paranoia and distrust to seep into the player's judgement. Writing for TechRadar, Hamish Hector detailed how whilst the game's jumpscares were cheap and avoidable, he found the looping mechanic made it "impossible to not grow paranoid". Nintendo Life's Ollie Reynolds expressed that the game was a cool experience with some moments that made him feel uneasy, describing the feeling of "not knowing what's around the corner" as what made the game engaging to players. However, he added that the feeling also led to frustration due to having to restart if you missed a subtle anomaly, enforcing the idea that the player needs to be patient when observing the corridor.

Conversely, Siliconera's Jenni Lada recounted how the game made her feel comfortable and that the hallway made them feel secure and immersed. Lada commented that because the game made her feel too comfortable it managed to catch her out and make mistakes, adding the game can help with replayability, stating she found the game "oddly relaxing to take a walk and pick out the 'mistakes'". Similarly, Hamish Hector found that whilst the game was short, he noted the game as being very replayable, recounting that every time he put the game down he was determined to play it again a few hours later. The banality and repetition in the game's presentation was comparable to commuter's instincts to notice changes in the environment during journeys on public transport according to Aftermath's Chris Person, with Person stating his playthrough reminded him of the video game LSD: Dream Emulator due to its similarities in noticing changes in everyday spaces and connecting them back to the player's actions. In his review, Rock Paper Shotgun's Ed Thorn details how the game did an "excellent job" by imitating Japanese comedy and game show humour, adding that some anomalies leaned towards the more whacky and fantastical side. He reflected that the game "wouldn't be amiss in a Yakuza [game]".

One drawback critics had with the game was its short length. In Lada's review, she mentioned that if you were good and lucky with the game, it would only take the player around "15–30 minutes" to complete, adding further that "once you've played it enough times, you'll have done it all and have no reason to return". Ollie Reynolds did not believe he would return to the game after the first playthrough and admitted that he did not find the overall game scary, hypothesising that if the game was more similar to P.T. and leant more into the horror aspects, the game would be deemed "a modern classic". Additionally, Reynolds added that he thought that gyro aiming would have made playing the game more intuitive. Similarly, Jordan Helm hoped that Kotake Create would use the game as a foundation for a more ambitious and bolder project in the future. However, Helm added that Kotake created a "fifteen-minute experience with more warranted involvement and intriguing design" than other games with a longer play time.

==== VR version ====
Similar to the original version, The Exit 8 VR was generally well received by critics, with many claiming that the use of virtual reality helped enhance the gameplay and environment. In her review for UploadVR, Alicia Haddick described how she felt that this version heightened the overall sense of unease when playing, calling the game a "natural fit" for the Quest headset. Pulling from her memories of visiting Nogizaka Station in Tokyo, Haddick felt returning to a familiar location that was "distinctly off" was improved by the immersion of virtual reality, stating the tension of playing was heightened when wearing the headset. Famitsu writer Abu Yamazaki found playing the game to be immersive and creepy, feeling that their fear was doubled when experiencing the game in VR; Yamazaki denotes the red water anomaly and the fast-walking NPC passer-by anomaly as particularly scary on their playthrough. Adding onto this, Yamazaki noted that anomalies that occurred above and below the player were easier to spot compared to the ones on the player's sides, as well as stating that the game's increased lighting helped make anomalies easier to notice.

Jenni Lada from Siliconera mentioned how the simplistic nature and execution of the game benefitted from VR, feeling that the headset helped enhance the game's sound design and audio cues, making them easier to notice. She also felt the VR aided in anomaly hunting and made certain anomalies more unsettling and fun to experience due to being able observe them up-close, writing that "it's immersive in a way that was impossible on the Switch". Sharing similar sentiments with Lada, The Escapist's Shaun Cichacki stated that the game's visuals looked "phenomenal" and made the experience a lot more impactful, even noting that the environment that he was exploring felt more akin to real life than "just playing another video game." Writing further, Cichacki praised the game's sound design and commented that "the monotonous humming of the electricity" broke the "sterile and somewhat serene" environment, feeling that the noise and player's footsteps being some of the only noises in the game to be "executed well" and made anomalies easier to detect. Hisui Mizuki from Real Sound wrote how whilst they thought the visuals were on par with the original version, the atmosphere of the VR version was comparable to real life, adding that the sounds of the lights and footsteps being heard in 3D made the sense of loneliness when playing stronger. Continuing on, Hisui wrote how she felt that due to having a narrower field of view with the VR headset, it made anomalies more difficult and a lot scarier than the original version, which made the game more enjoyable.

=== Sales ===
Upon the release of the game, it was announced that the game had sold 30,000 copies within the first day. By April 17, Kotake Create announced that the Steam release of the game sold 500,000 copies. Two days after the release of the game on Nintendo Switch The Exit 8 became the top most downloaded Switch game that week in Japan, beating out games such as Bunny Garden and Suika Game. According to a press release in August 2024, it was announced the game had reached over 1 million downloads, with the suggestion that the Switch version helped significantly push the game to that milestone. In 2024, the game became the 2nd most downloaded game on the Nintendo Switch eShop in Japan only being beaten by Suika Game. By January 2025, Playism announced that the game has achieved over 1.4 million downloads worldwide across all versions. In March 2025, the game had received over 1.5 million downloads worldwide. By August 2025, the game surpassed 2 million copies sold. As of September 2026, The Exit 8 has sold over 3 million copies, with Playism launching a sale for The Exit 8 and Platform 8, as well as placing commemorative advertisement on the Happy Board in Shibuya Station's Dōgenzaka area for one week in response to hitting the milestone.

In the wake of the release of the film adaptation, The Exit 8 topped the list of paid games on the Google Play Store in Japan. According to data published by Sensor Tower, between 16 August and 15 September 2025, The Exit 8 was the most downloaded paid mobile game on iPhones in Japan, as well as being on top of mobile rankings for iPad and Android devices from 4 to 8 September. Sensor Tower attributed this to the release of the film, noting that around the same timeframe, the game had grossed over ¥12 million (approximately US$80,000) on mobile, which was five times larger than the 2nd highest grossing mobile game at the time, Chants of Sennaar. The film's impact was also attributed to an increase in daily active users (DAU) on the PC/Console versions, with the Steam and PlayStation versions noted as a significant increase.

=== Awards ===
The Exit 8 has also won multiple awards in the Japanese gaming industry. It won the Breakthrough Award at the Japan Game Awards 2024, where the selection committee praised the game's "ingenious" idea. At the 2024 CEDEC Awards, it won an Excellence Award in Game Design due to the game's "simple and easy-to-understand design" as well as its creativity in incorporating familiar scenery. At the Kyoto Digital Amusement Awards, a ceremony held by the Kyoto Prefecture to recognise young Kyoto-based creators, Kotake Create won the Governer's Award (Grand Prize) for his work on The Exit 8. During the Dengeki Indie Game Awards 2024, The Exit 8 was voted as the 10th best indie game of 2024. At the 27th Independent Games Festival, The Exit 8 was announced as a finalist for the Nuovo Award, losing out to Consume Me. The Exit 8 was also nominated for the Grand Prize and the Internet Buzzword of the Year Award for the 41st New Words and Buzzwords Awards and the 2024 Internet Buzzword Award, respectively, finishing tenth for the latter award. As part of Google's “Google Play Best of 2025" for Japan, the game won the grand prize in the indie category due to it being widely played.

List of awards and nominations
Year	Awards	Category	Result	Ref.
2024	Japan Game Awards 2024	Breakthrough Award	Won	
2024	2024 CEDEC Awards	Excellence Award in Game Design	Won	
2024	41st 2024 New Words and Buzzwords Awards	Grand Prize	Nominated	
2024	2024 Internet Buzzword Award	Internet Buzzword of the Year Award	10th Place	
2025	27th Independent Games Festival	Nuovo Award	Finalist	

== Legacy ==
=== Analysis ===
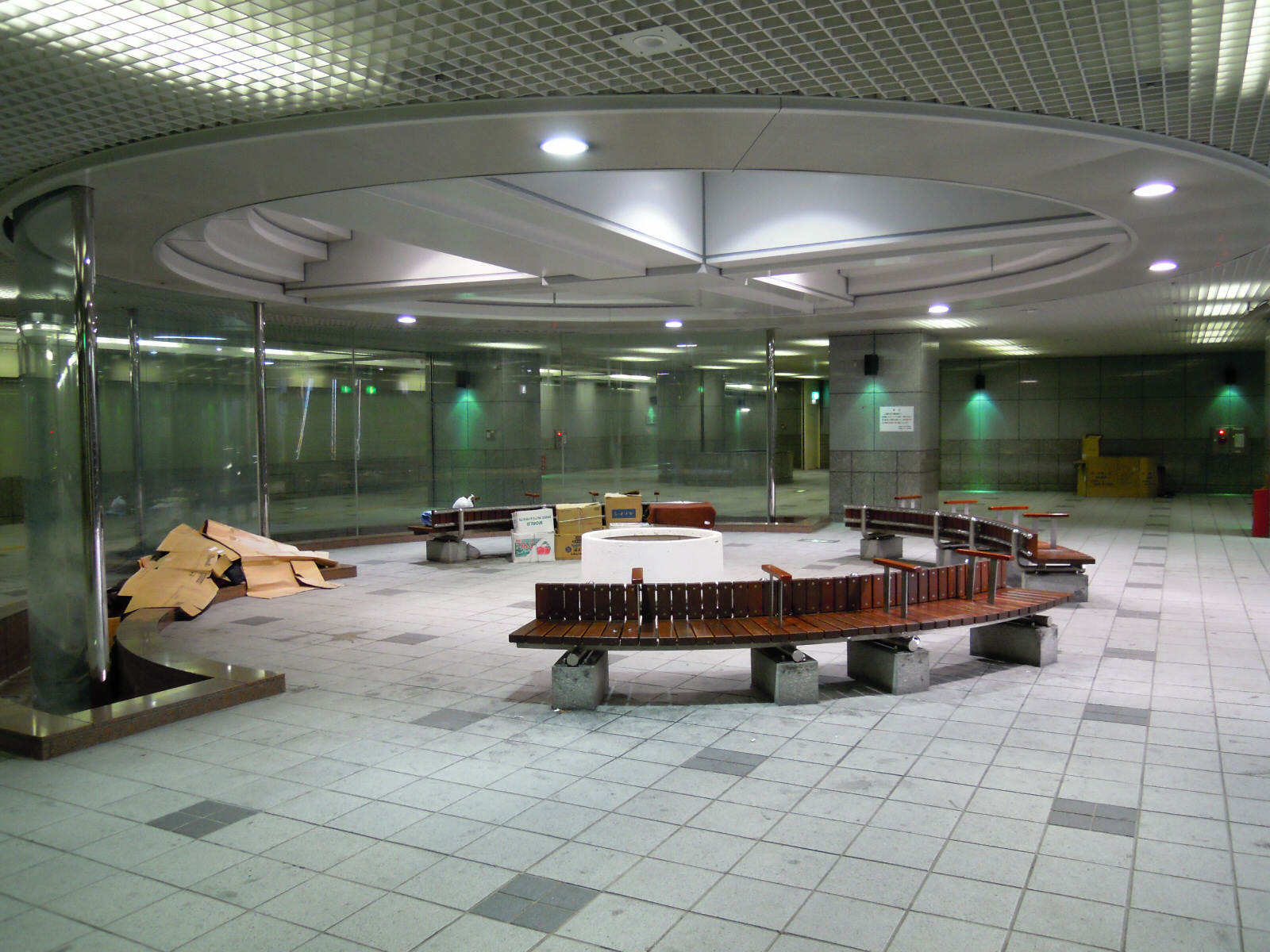
An image depicting a liminal space in the underground of Japan

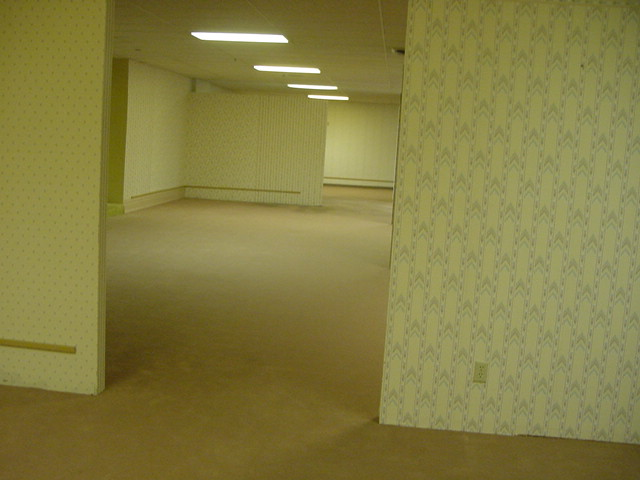
The picture that led to the creation of The Backrooms urban legend

Since The Exit 8's release, journalists began to analyse the game's success and what made it popular. In an interview with Shueisha Online, Kanakki, narrator for horror radio show "Magabanashi [ja] (禍話)", believed that part of what made the game successful was its blending of the non-horrific/gore supernatural elements in an ordinary urban environment, detailing that the game had dream-like qualities such as the looping mechanic that "really add to the eeriness." Kanakki further emphasised that the dream-like qualities also linked to the concept of liminal spaces, labelling underground passageways as "transitional spaces" that may allow person to imagine they are in another world. Kanakki suggested liminal spaces were another aspect he believed the game's success derived from, stemming from their rise in popularity from stories on message boards such as "Monkey Dream [ja] (猿夢)" and "The Backrooms". He explained how liminal spaces create a sense of nostalgia and claustrophobia, which Kanakki linked as a common theme to 1990s video games; he described how it would induce a fear of uncanniness, which he believes the game takes advantage of to allow players to "experience the presence of fear". Writing for Tatler Asia, Suchetana Mukhopadhyay saw the game as part of a growing trend in popularity for survival narratives in media, comparing The Exit 8 with television shows such as Alice in Borderland and Squid Game along with the video game Silent Hill f. Mukhopadhyay linked their popularity to people wanting to control their fate in an uncontrollable world, noting the game as demonstration that the human spirit is "indomitable."

In an article by TheGamer, Eric Switzer noted how due to the game's short gameplay loop it allowed the game to thrive on social media platforms such as TikTok, which caused the game to gain popularity and success. Similarly, according to Shueisha Online, playthrough videos of the game on YouTube have amassed a total of over 100 million views as of February 2025, with Japanese YouTubers such as Hikakin and Sakura Miko, as well as Nogizaka46 singer Haruka Kaki [ja] (賀喜遥香), observed to have played the game on their channels. Real Sound's Chihiro Yuki similarly believed that the game's success stemmed from its realistic graphics and easy to understand gameplay in a small environment which made it "highly compatible with live commentary and streaming culture", leading to its popularity. Later in the article, Yuki stated that he believed that The Exit 8 getting a film adaptation was an extension of its commercial and cultural success earned by its ideas and concepts, adding that if the film was successful it could lead a trend in indie games being adapted into other mediums, mentioning Gnosia and Paranormasight: The Seven Mysteries of Honjo (Note: Yuki mentioned in the article that Paranormasight was not an indie game, however, he still justified the comparison due to the game being a "small-scale production" that shared similarities with The Exit 8.) as other examples; Yuki expressed that it "will be a pioneer in the 'indie game film adaptation' movement."

=== Exit 8-likes ===
Following the release of The Exit 8, an influx of indie games inspired by the premise of the game became available online. Dubbed "Exit 8-like" by both news outlets and the developer themselves, also referred to as "8-likes" or "anomaly horror" by fans and journalists respectively, these games feature similar or even identical gameplay to Exit 8 but often set in a different environment and often trying to capture the liminal space aesthetic with examples such a shopping centre, hospital or subway trains. One such game, called "0th floor. – The cursed elevator to floor zero -", has the game set in an elevator and has the players looking for anomalies on different floors of a building, all of which have a different setting. Some of these Exit 8-likes leaned more into the horror aspect of the gameplay, such as by adding paranormal entities such as monsters and ghosts. A different take on this concept is "holo8", (Note: The game is meant to be pronounced "Holo-Hachi"; hachi being Japanese for "eight".) an Exit 8-like set in the offices of vtuber agency Hololive Production and featured over 70 current and former members such as Houshou Marine and Minato Aqua. Some of these can even change game genres or playstyles, such as changing to an FPS or online co-op. An example of this are the games "Track No. 9" and "Train45", two different adventure games which feature two-dimensional pixelated art-style where the player searches for anomalies on a subway platform or a train respectively. Many of these Exit 8-likes have been made available on online game stores such as Steam, itch.io and Unity Room.

神谷英樹🍀 Hideki Kamiya🍀
(@HidekiKamiya_X)
tweeted:

だから「8番ライク」って俺的に違和感あるんよな…

ゲーム史的には「P.T.ライク」と呼ぶのが正しいと思う…それくらいP.T.は革新的で、他に類を見ない独創性があり、後続のゲーム製作者達にも強い影響を与えたと思う…

※P.T.以前に閉鎖空間リピート系ゲームがあったら優しく教えてください…

Translation:

That's why the term Exit 8-like feels off to me. From a game history perspective, I think calling it P.T.-like would be more accurate. That's how innovative P.T. was, completely unique and without precedent, not to mention hugely influential on the developers who followed. (If there actually were looping closed-space games before P.T. I'm forgetting about, please kindly let me know).

10 October 2024

In October 2024, video game director and designer Hideki Kamiya made a series of tweets on his X account recounting how he thought when first playing the game it was styled like P.T., but was surprised when other people did not make a similar comparison. Kamiya argued that the genre should be referred to as "P.T.-likes" because P.T. was "the true originator" and influential for succeeding game designers. He further lamented that because P.T. was delisted from online stores by Konami, it would lose recognition over time and allow The Exit 8 to take its spot, with Kamiya chastising Konami for missing the potential of the idea and permanently delisting the game.

In response to the large amount of "copycats", Kotake Create expressed that they do not condone the use of thumbnails or titles on gameplay videos of Exit 8-like games that could be seen as connections to the original game. Further elaborating on his stance, Kotake mentioned that he would get messages from people about games "ripping off" The Exit 8, clarifying he was not angered by them as his game was also influenced by others. Kotake further stated that the reason he condoned the genre was due to the inability to stop people from making games using the same formula and that "ideas aren't copyrighted", adding that he was happy his creation "pioneered" a genre. Additionally the developer shared links to some Exit 8-likes that they were looking forward to and stated that "as a developer, I think it is absolutely ok to make a new game that 'puts a new spin on existing games,' as long as it is not exactly the same setting or gameplay system etc." One of the most notable examples of this was The Exit 9, which was released on the PlayStation Store in January 2024. Due to the game's strong likeness to The Exit 8, it caused online fans of the game to ask Kotake Create about the copycat to which they denied any involvement with The Exit 9. Verity Townsend from Automaton West speculated that the developers of the copycat were taking advantage of the fact that the original game was not released on consoles. Following the release of the PlayStation versions of The Exit 8, the copycat was rebranded to Exit 9 Metro. As of February 2025, the store page for the game has been delisted on the PS Store. During an interview, Kotake listed the games False Dreams, Victor's Test Night and Dead End as Exit 8-likes that left an impression on him.

In 2026, researchers at the Osaka Electro-Communication University developed a virtual reality experience inspired by The Exit 8 to teach people about indoor disaster prevention and mitigation for events such as earthquakes and floods through gamification in a VR environment. The experience, which has users wear a VR headset to explore a virtual room, adopts the "spot the difference" gameplay of The Exit 8 by having them identify "hazardous indoor conditions lacking disaster safety measures", such as cluttered areas. Throughout the experience, rooms are randomly assigned to the users with some containing no errors, prompting the user to determine which rooms have hazardous areas and which don't; rooms that do contain errors would also further explain the user about why these areas are dangerous and what can be done to counter them whenever the user correctly spots an error or gets a game over. According to the study, 83% of the 123 participants involved found that their awareness of disaster risks had increased following the experience.

=== Popularity ===
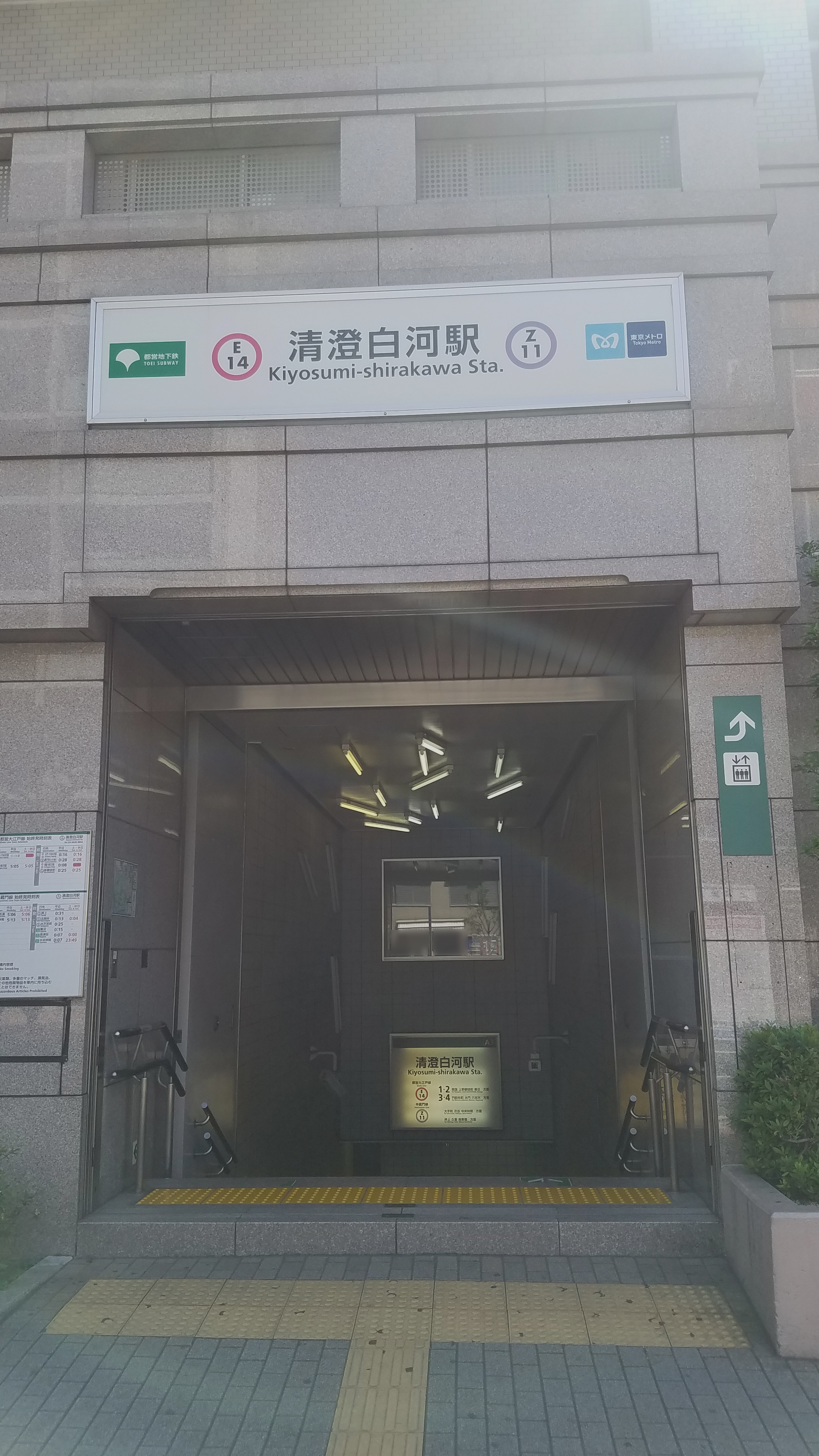
A picture of Exit A3. Part of the art installation can be seen on top the ceiling above the stairs.

Following the rise of The Exit 8's popularity, it attracted many fans from around the world to visit Kiyosumi-shirakawa Station, a station heavily speculated to be the base model for the game's passageway. In particular, the in-game passageway was speculated to have been based on Exit A3 in the station, which featured an irregular pattern of fluorescent lights scattered around the ceiling as part of a public art installation according to the Tokyo Metropolitan Bureau of Transportation. People who would travel to the station would often compare the environment to the game, with some even spreading rumours that supernatural incidents occur in the station. Due to the influx of visitors at the station, the reactions from local citizens and frequent users of the station were mixed. When asked by Shueisha Online, some felt surprised by the increase in visitors at the station, with one describing how prior to its gained popularity the station was non-distinctive and comparable to any other. However, others expressed anger and dismay at the new visitors, detailing how a number of visitors showcased unsociable behaviour towards the area such as littering; another local argued the area should be visited for its mikoshi and festivals, rather than for a video game.

Automaton West reported that following the release of the game, fans online had grown affectionate to the NPC passer-by seen in the game and had created works in his image such as fan art or recreating the character in games like Phantasy Star Online 2 or Soulcalibur VI. Described as a middle-aged man with a receding hairline and dressed in work clothes and a briefcase, the passer-by only walks down the hallway and can occasionally be one of the game's many anomalies, but never actually interacts with the player. Speculating as to why some fans felt so passionate towards the character, the article's author, Hideaki Fujiwara, believed that due to the NPC being the only other real person in the game, (Note: Not counting the ones that appear in anomalies) fans see the passer-by as a "source of security and familiarity for the player" which the feelings would then continue to build. Seeing as the player has to scrutinise every aspect of the game in order to spot anomalies, they add that it would cause players to notice certain qualities of the passer-by, describing the man as having a "sleeper build". Alternatively, Fujiwara also posited the idea the feelings may derive from the "mere-exposure effect", which caused players to like the character just from walking past them over and over. When questioned about the character, Kotake Create mentioned that he too had become attached to the man during development and liked reading comments about the man from players in reviews, adding that the man became the largest 3D model in the game at around 140,000 polygons. The character returned in the game's sequel, Platform 8. To celebrate The Exit 8 reaching 1 million downloads, a line of merchandise featuring the passer-by would be sold in Ikebukuro Parco department stores for a limited time between 23 August and 30 September 2024. At the 2024 Tokyo Game Show, an Exit 8 photo spot was set up, where attendees could take a picture with the passer-by. In December 2024, Playism began distributing masks resembling different variations of the passer-by outside the ticket gates at Shinjuku Station to advertise both Exit 8 and Platform 8.

In mid-April 2024, Japanese pharmaceutical company Earth Corporation [ja] (アース製薬) launched a web commercial parodying the game to advertise their mouthwash product, Mondamin. Due to a mistake on the company's Twitter account, Kotake Create responded to users stating that the commercial was not done as part of a collaboration and instead merely granted permission for the company to parody the game. During the same month, merchandise for the game was announced and would be distributed in stages across the year at amusement arcades and online retailers. In late-March 2025, The Exit 8 content was featured in an update for the game Maid Cafe on Electric Street as part of a collaboration. In July 2026, Japanese indie developer Lemorion_1224 announced The Exit 8 would be collaborating with the game Meccha Chameleon, with a playable map based on the passageway being added on 1 August.

=== Film adaptation ===
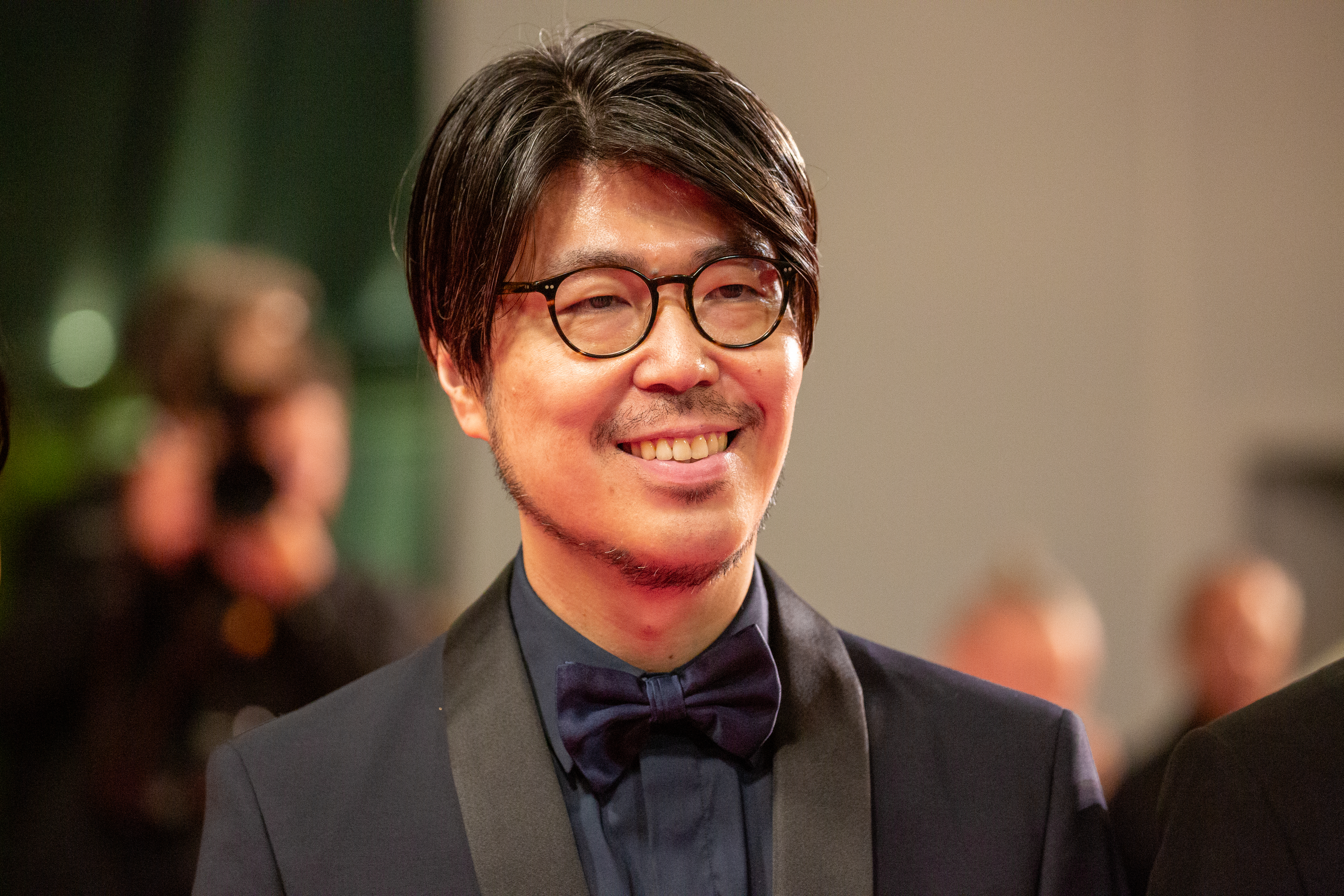
Exit 8's director, Genki Kawamura, at the film's premiere at the 2025 Cannes Film Festival

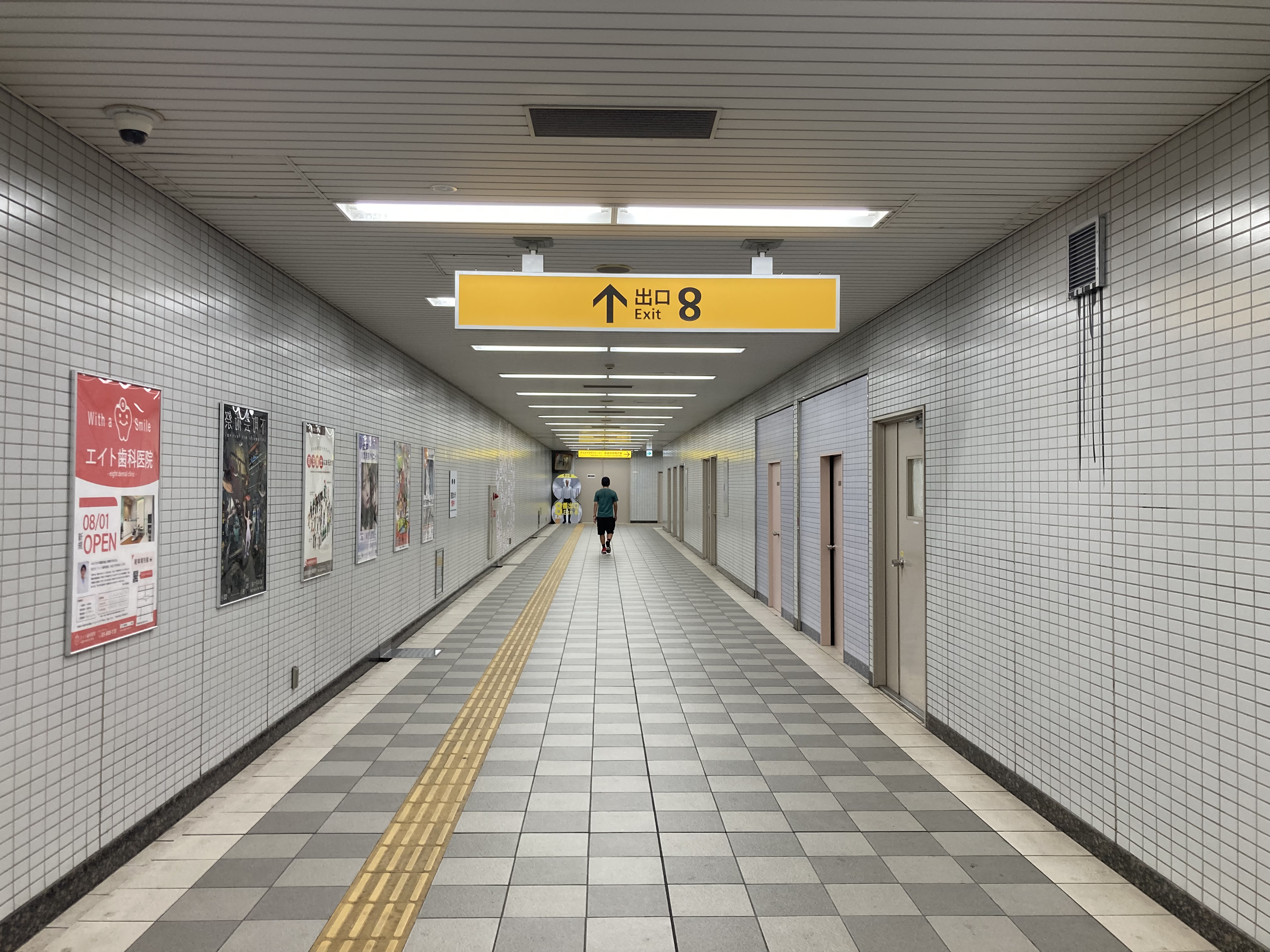
The recreation of the game's passageway at Shin-Nagata Station as part of a collaboration event for the film

A live-action film based on the Exit 8 video game was announced by Toho on 27 December 2024, with Genki Kawamura set to write, produce and direct the film. The film, which stars Kazunari Ninomiya and Yamato Kochi as the "lost man" and "walking man" respectively, premiered at the 2025 Cannes Film Festival's Midnight Screenings on 19 May 2025, before subsequently releasing a few months later on 29 August in Japan. On film review aggregator Rotten Tomatoes, Exit 8 has amassed a score of 96% score based on 27 reviews. The film received positive reviews from critics representing Dread Central, Game Watch Impress, IndieWire, Inverse, RogerEbert.com, Screen Daily, Slant Magazine, and the South China Morning Post. At the box office, the film earned over ¥960 million (approximately US$6.46 million) in its first three days of release, becoming the highest grossing live-action film released in Japan in 2025. By 12 September, the film had grossed over ¥2.49 billion (approximately US$15.9 million) internationally; by 25 September 2025, two weeks later, the film has grossed over ¥4.01 billion (approximately US$27 million). According to Screen Daily, the film was the joint 8th highest grossing film in the Japanese box office from between December 2024 to November 2025, grossing ¥5.17billion (approximately $33.9m). As of 1 February 2026, the film has grossed over $39.1m.

To celebrate the release of the film, a limited amount of film-inspired box art covers for the physical releases of the game on PlayStation 4, PlayStation 5 and Nintendo Switch were distributed across retailers in Japan. Multiple collaboration events were also held around different areas of Japan, such as one day photo op with Yamato Kōchi as well as the film's promotional material at Omotesandō Crossing Park in Omotesandō, Tokyo. From between 29 August to 3 November 2025, an escape game titled Tokyo Metro Escape Game: Exit 8 was set up across the Tokyo Metro by ESCAPE LLC on their ESCAPE.ID website where participates could spot anomalies and solves puzzles to escape the subway by purchasing a puzzle-solving kit. Within the first 28 days of the event's launch, over 20,000 people had purchased to tickets to participate. In a collaboration between Toho and the Kobe Municipal Subway for the film adaption, a real life version of the exit was created at Shin-Nagata Station, with plans to open the exit to the public on 31 October 2025. Another collaboration with the Shin-Nagata Ichibangai shopping district was also announced by the Kobe Municipal Transportation Bureau to be underway.

In the United States, Exit 8 debuted at Beyond Fest as part of American Cinematheque on 27 September 2025. The film is planned to be released internationally at future dates, with film distribution company Neon purchasing the distribution rights for the film in North America. In February 2026, Neon announced the film would release in North American theatres on 10 April 2026.

=== Novelisation ===
A manga adaptation written and illustrated by Tamura Mitsuhisa was launched on 30 May 2025. Later, a novel adaptation of the film was also released ahead of the film's launch on 9 July 2025 and published by Suirinsha, with actor Yuki Kaji providing the narration in the audiobook version. The novel helped to explain certain events that happened within the film, such as the tsunami event. Within its initial print run, the novel sold over 100,000 copies. The screenplay for the film was one of ten screenplays added by the Japan Writers Guild [ja] (ニ本スカサカサカ京会) to the 2025 edition of the "Yearbook of Representative Screenplays" ('25年鑑代表シナリオ集), an annual compilation of the best Japanese film screenplays of each year.
