= First-person adventure =

First-person adventure may refer to different video game genres that can be played from a first-person perspective:

- Adventure game, a game driven by exploration and/or puzzle-solving
  - Walking simulator, a subgenre of adventure games primarily consisting of movement
- Action-adventure game, a hybrid of action and adventure game genres
- First-person shooter, gun and other weapon-based combat games

"First-person adventure" was also a marketing phrase used by Nintendo for Metroid Prime.
