= Maid Cafe on Electric Street =

2024 video game

- Developer: Adventurer's Tavern
- Publisher: Playism
- Platform: Microsoft Windows
- Release: Windows; November 18, 2024; Switch; February 26, 2026
- Genres: Simulation, Adventure
- Mode: Single-player

Maid Cafe on Electric Street (Note: Japanese: 電気街の喫茶店) is a 2024 simulation video game developed by China-based Adventurer's Tavern and published by Japanese video game publisher Playism. The player controls a manager of maid café in Nipponbashi, Osaka, with the goal of making it return to its former glory.

The game was released for Microsoft Windows on November 18, 2024. The Nintendo Switch version was released on 26 February 2026.

== Gameplay ==
Maid Cafe on Electric Street is a simulation video game with adventure gameplay, where the player leads the daily life of running the Fuwa Fuwa Cafe, a maid café in Nipponbashi, Osaka. The game has elements of adventure and role-playing game.

== Development and release ==
Maid Cafe on Electric Street was developed by Adventurer’s Tavern, a development studio located in Shanghai, China, which had released visual novel Change and puzzle adventure game Wuxia Archive: Crisis Escape. The protagonist's backstory of suffering from toxic workplace was based on the director's own experience. Nipponbashi was chosen as the game's main setting instead of Akihabara due to the director's personal familiarity with the city and Nipponbashi having "the appeal of being less orthodox".

The game includes depiction of real-life brands in Den Den Town, where the game takes place. Pixel-art versions of stores like Super Potato, Surugaya and Game Tanteidan can be visited. The four maids at Fuwa Fuwa Cafe were voiced by Ikumi Hasegawa (Shiro), Ayasa Itō (Miyu), Sayumi Suzushiro (Favna), and Yui Ishikawa (Honoka).

Maid Cafe on Electric Street was first released on November 18, 2024, for PC via Steam. It was published by Playism. The developer plans to port the game to home consoles. On January 22, 2025, a major update was patched to the game, adding a new side story Rin and the Mysterious Challenge, new NPCs, new features, and bug fixes. The second update on 27 March added a new content in collaboration with video games The Exit 8 and Urban Myth Dissolution Center. The Nintendo Switch version was released on 26 February 2026.

== Reception ==
Reception

Review score
Publication	Score
Siliconera	7/10

Siliconera's Jenni Lada was favorable of the game's graphics and recreation of the experience in Japan, but found its gameplay tedious in certain parts, such as management tasks.
