= Unreal Engine 5 =

Game engine

- Original author: Tim Sweeney
- Developer: Epic Games
- Release: 5.0 / April 5, 2022; 4 years ago
- Stable release: 5.8 / June 17, 2026; 4 months ago
- Written in: C++
- Operating system: Windows, Linux, macOS, PlayStation 4, PlayStation 5, Xbox One, Xbox Series X/S, Nintendo Switch, Nintendo Switch 2, iOS, Android
- Predecessor: Unreal Engine 4
- Successor: Unreal Engine 6
- License: Source-available commercial software with royalty model for commercial use
- Website: unrealengine.com

Unreal Engine 5 (UE5) is the latest iteration of Unreal Engine, developed by Epic Games. It was revealed in May 2020 and officially released in April 2022. Unreal Engine 5 includes multiple upgrades and new features, including Nanite, a system that automatically adjusts the level of detail of meshes, and Lumen, a dynamic global illumination and reflections system that leverages software as well as hardware accelerated ray tracing.

== History ==
The cave system in the "Lumen in the Land of Nanite" Unreal Engine 5 demo was generated using real-world photogrammetry assets imported into the Nanite engine rather than detailed by hand.

Unreal Engine 5 was revealed on May 13, 2020, supporting all existing systems that could run Unreal Engine 4, including the PlayStation 5 and Xbox Series X/S. It was released in early access on May 26, 2021, and formally launched for developers on April 5, 2022.

Epic Games worked with Sony to optimize Unreal Engine 5 for the PlayStation 5. To demonstrate the engine's ease of use, both companies collaborated on a demo called "Lumen in the Land of Nanite" for the PlayStation 5 which featured a photorealistic cave setting that players could explore. The demo was showcased during the May 2020 reveal of the engine, and leveraged Nanite, Lumen, and assets from the Quixel library. Epic also affirmed that the Xbox Series X/S would fully support Unreal Engine 5.

Epic has used its game Fortnite as a testbed for Unreal Engine 5. The game was updated to use Unreal Engine 5 in December 2021. Briefly after, Epic released The Matrix Awakens, a promotional game demo for the 2021 movie The Matrix Resurrections, to showcase Unreal Engine 5 and other technology (such as MetaHuman Creator).

Unreal Engine 5 was made available to download in April 2022. It included a redesigned Unreal Editor with new animation and modelling tools. Some of the first major titles making full use of the new engine were released in 2023, including the Layers of Fear remake, Remnant 2 and Immortals of Aveum.

== Features ==
Example of a natural landscape made in Unreal Engine 5

=== Nanite ===
A major feature of Unreal Engine 5 is Nanite, a virtualized geometry system that allows developers to use photogrammetry and other high-detail meshes in their games without significant performance impact. Traditionally, artists had to create multiple models for different levels of detail (LoDs) and generate normal maps for finer details. Nanite automatically manages LoDs by scaling models dynamically based on draw distance, screen resolution, and performance requirements. It partitions meshes into a set of 128-triangle clusters called meshlets, allowing different parts of a single mesh to render at varying levels of detail. (Note: Karis himself does not use the term meshlet, which is an industry term that describes this data structure.) Nanite is compatible with many 3D model formats, including ZBrush sculpts and CAD models, enabling developers to directly import film-quality assets without manual optimization. According to Epic Games' Brian Karis, one of the significant innovations in Nanite is its ability to stitch edges between different automatically generated LoDs seamlessly, ensuring that no cracks appear at boundaries. In its initial release, Nanite was only compatible with static meshes.

Unreal Engine 5 takes advantage of the high-speed solid-state storage in next-generation hardware in order to stream assets into memory as they are needed. Epic Games CEO Tim Sweeney emphasized that this storage speed allows developers to "bring in [a game's] geometry and display it despite it not all fitting in memory," eliminating traditional loading screens and enabling seamless transitions between varying levels of detail as objects move closer to the player. Additionally, UE5 provides a way to divide large maps into smaller partitions called "World Partition," which decreases the amount of the level needed to be loaded.

=== Lumen ===
Lumen is a dynamic ray traced global illumination and reflections system that can react in real-time to scene and lighting changes. It eliminates the need for precomputed lightmaps for a given scene and enables automatic adjustments to light, reflections, and shadows. Lumen supports both software and hardware ray tracing. The software ray tracing option, which uses Mesh Distance Fields, is optimized for a broad range of devices and enables fast ray intersections at the cost of lower fidelity. Hardware ray tracing offers higher accuracy and supports additional geometry types, including skinned meshes. Lumen also incorporates a Surface Cache system that reduces the computational overhead required to evaluate lighting. When Lumen is disabled, the engine defaults to Signed Distance Field Ambient Occlusion for a lower-fidelity lighting solution.

=== Virtual Shadow Maps ===
Virtual Shadow Maps is another component added in Unreal Engine 5 described as "a new shadow mapping method used to deliver consistent, high-resolution shadowing that works with film-quality assets and large, dynamically lit open worlds". Virtual Shadow Maps differs from the common shadow map implementation in its high resolution, more detailed shadows, and the absence of shadow cascade and pop-in issues present in commonly used shadow mapping techniques.

=== Other features ===
UE5 uses Niagara for fluid and particle dynamics and its own Chaos physics engine in place of PhysX. Added in UE5.2, the engine introduced a new material creation system named Substrate, offering more versatile and modular authoring of materials.

Additional Unreal Engine 5 features come from Epic's acquisitions and partnerships. The Nanite virtualized geometry technology allows Epic to take advantage of its past acquisition of Quixel, the world's largest photogrammetry library as of 2019. The MetaHuman Creator is a project based on technology from three companies acquired by Epic—3Lateral, Cubic Motion, and Quixel—to allow developers to quickly create realistic human characters that can then be exported for use within Unreal. Through partnership with Cesium, Epic plans to offer a free plugin to provide 3D geospatial data for Unreal users, allowing them to recreate any part of the mapped surface of Earth. Epic will include RealityCapture, a product it acquired with its acquisition of Capturing Reality that can generate 3D models of any object from a collection of photographs taken of it from multiple angles, and the various middleware tools offered by Epic Games Tools.

From UE 5.5 onwards, Epic Games introduced a layer that makes it easier to maintain WebRTC internally, allowing Pixel Streaming 2 plugin to began shipping with Unreal Engine.

== Reception ==
Unreal Engine 5 has been credited with allowing developers to create games using higher fidelity assets via Nanite with more realistic lighting via Lumen. Gaming outlets credited UE5 for its use in multiple games from 2023 to 2025 including Black Myth: Wukong, ARC Raiders, Remnant 2, Senua's Saga: Hellblade II and Avowed. It has also been praised for allowing smaller independent and AA developers to achieve similar levels of graphical fidelity as larger studios. For example, Sandfall Interactive's debut title and 2025 Game of the Year Clair Obscur: Expedition 33 utilized many features like Lumen, Nanite and MetaHuman, to assist in keeping the development process more focused on the elements that would have the most impact on the player experience.

The engine has been blamed for certain types of performance issues, namely shader compilation stutter and traversal stutter—frame-time jumps that occur when a player's actions cause more entities to load into the game, although not all UE5 games display these issues to the same degree. Additionally, the use of temporal anti-aliasing, which is enabled by default, can in some cases lead to blur. Epic Games has acknowledged the shader compilation issue and has created a new system to better identify which shaders to precompile. CD Projekt, meanwhile, is working on a custom system that improves entity loading for The Witcher IV, parts of which may be upstreamed to Unreal Engine itself.

== Licensing ==
Unreal Engine 5 retains the royalty model started with Unreal Engine 4, with developers returning 5% of gross revenues to Epic Games, although this fee is waived for sales made through the Epic Games Store (EGS). Further, Epic announced alongside Unreal Engine 5 that they will not take any fee from games using any version of Unreal Engine for the first US$1 million in gross revenue, retroactive to January 1, 2020. In October 2024, Epic lowered royalties to 3.5% on sales of games outside EGS if they list the game on EGS as well. The source code for Unreal Engine 5 is available on GitHub.

Epic unveiled per-seat licensing of the Unreal Engine, starting in April 2024, for its runtime use with non-gaming applications such as in film and television production if their revenues exceed $1 million, with each seat costing $1,850 per year.

== See also ==
- Category:Unreal Engine 5 games
