= Liminal space =

Internet aesthetic depicting empty or transitional places

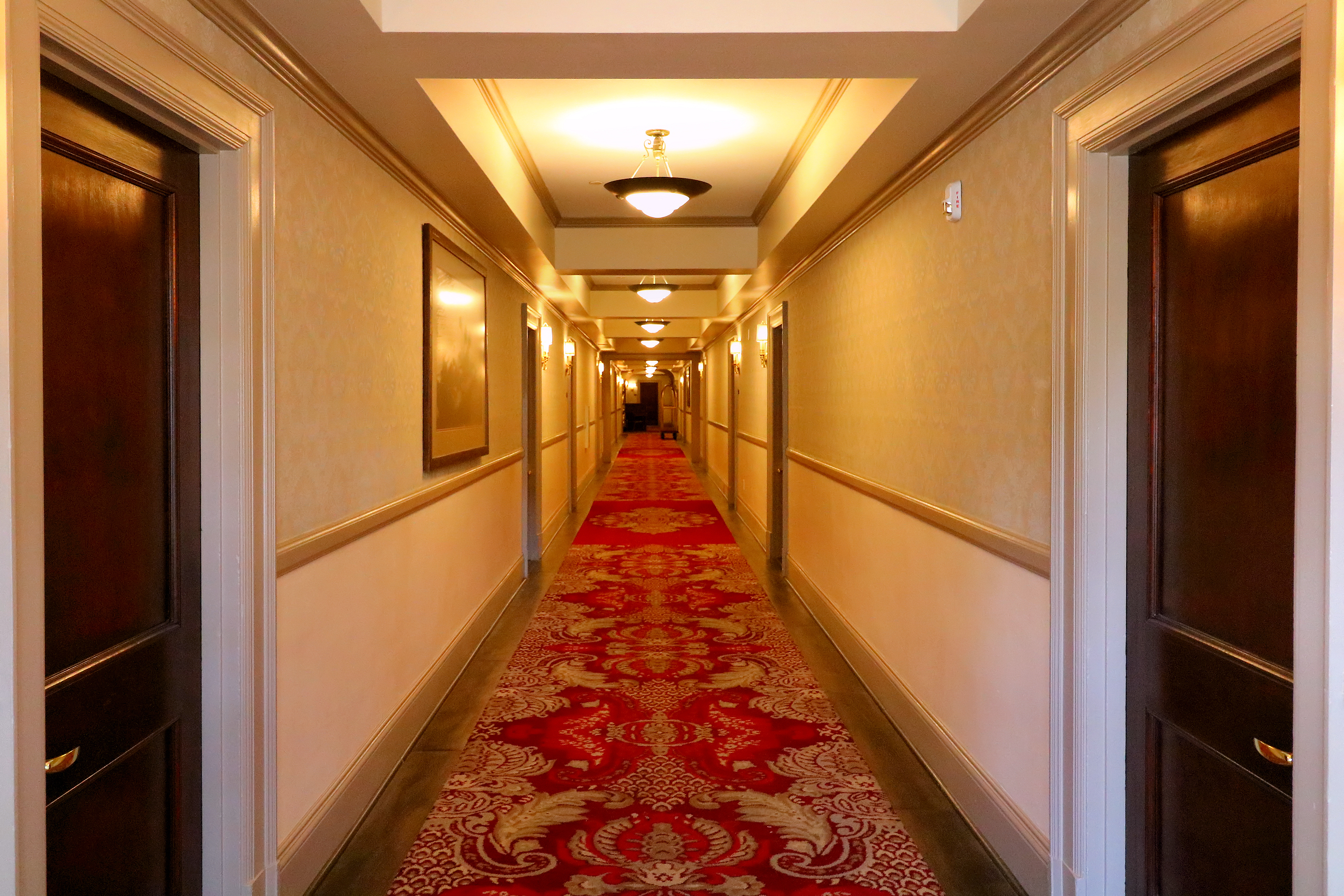
An empty hotel hallway, a common subject of liminal spaces

Liminal space is an internet aesthetic centered on depictions of empty, transitional, or temporary built environments, such as hallways, stairwells, lobbies, waiting rooms, empty parking lots, and closed shopping malls. In such imagery, the absence of people, activity, or context normally expected in a setting can make familiar places appear uncanny or surreal and may evoke nostalgia, sadness, comfort, or unease. The name derives from the anthropological concept of liminality, although its online use is broader and does not always refer to spaces that are literally transitional.

Liminal-space imagery circulated across online platforms in 2019, and the aesthetic became closely associated with the "Backrooms" creepypasta, an online urban legend that appeared on 4chan in May 2019. Interest increased during the COVID-19 pandemic, when images of unusually empty public spaces became widespread. Commentators have linked the aesthetic's appeal to nostalgia and the absence of expected human context; a 2022 study found that deviations from familiar architectural patterns can make built environments appear uncanny.

== Characteristics ==
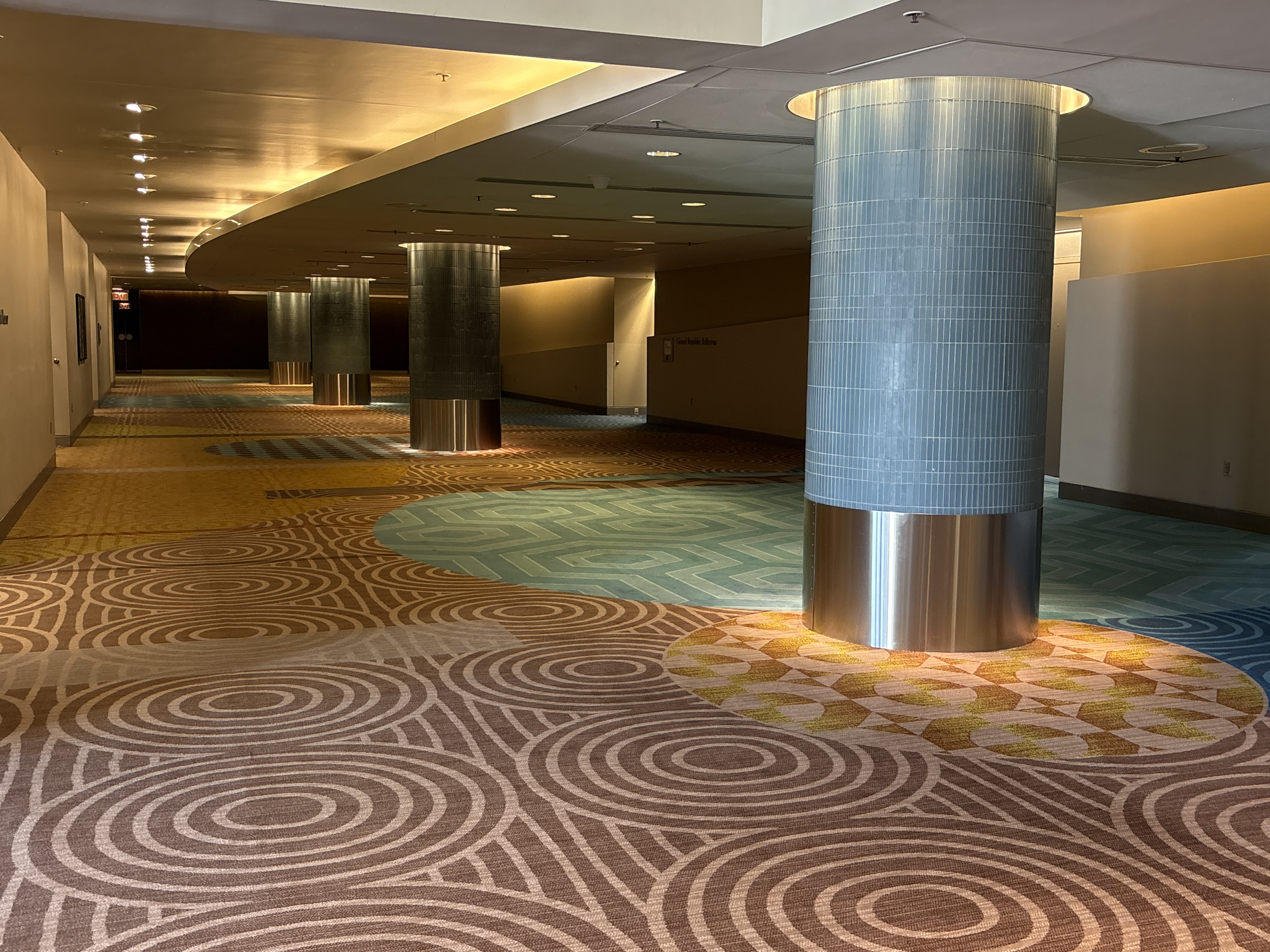
A corridor at Disney's Contemporary Resort, an example of a space associated with passage

Online use of the term is broader and more loosely defined than the anthropological concept of liminality. Some liminal-space images depict places associated with passage or temporary use, such as stairwells, roads, corridors, hotels, waiting rooms, or shopping malls; others show familiar settings without the people, activity, or context normally expected in them.

Seemingly endless environments like the one pictured (a stairway) can be seen as liminal.

Commentators have described the imagery as eerie, surreal, nostalgic, or sad, and as capable of eliciting both comfort and unease.

Peter Heft of Pulse: The Journal of Science and Culture has attributed the eeriness of some liminal-space imagery to familiar settings appearing outside their expected context. Drawing on the work of Mark Fisher, Heft describes the unexpected emptiness of a schoolhouse as a "failure of presence" characteristic of the eerie.

In a 2022 study, psychologists Alexander Diel and Michael Lewis found that deviations from familiar structural patterns can produce an uncanny-valley response to built environments.

Commentators have also linked the aesthetic's appeal to nostalgia and personal memory, as familiar visual cues invite viewers to recall or project comparable experiences onto otherwise contextless scenes.

== Development ==
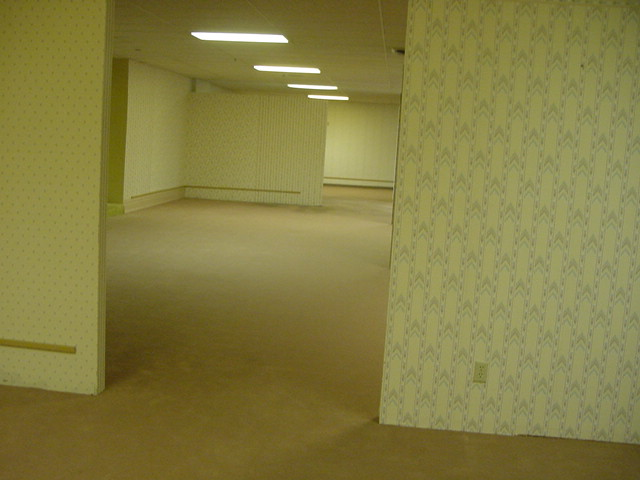
The photograph used in the original Backrooms thread

Arnold van Gennep introduced the anthropological notion of a liminal phase in Les rites de passage (1909). Van Gennep divided rites of passage into three phases: separation, liminality, and reaggregation or incorporation. Anthropologist Victor Turner later expanded the study of liminality, characterizing the liminal phase as being "betwixt and between" socially recognized positions.

In 2019, users on 4chan, Reddit, Tumblr, and other online platforms shared imagery associated with the liminal-space aesthetic. The Backrooms, an online urban legend that appeared on 4chan in May 2019, became closely associated with the aesthetic. In the thread, a user posted an image of an apparently vacant, carpeted interior lit by yellowed fluorescent lights; another replied with a description of an immense maze of empty rooms that could be entered by noclipping out of reality.

Interest increased during the COVID-19 pandemic, when photographs of unusually empty public spaces became widespread. A spike in the popularity of liminal-space imagery was reported in March 2020 as lockdowns began.

By November 2022, a subreddit called r/LiminalSpace had over 500,000 members, the liminal-space photo-posting account @SpaceLiminalBot on Twitter had accrued over 1.2 million followers, and the TikTok hashtag #liminalspaces had over two billion views.

== In media ==
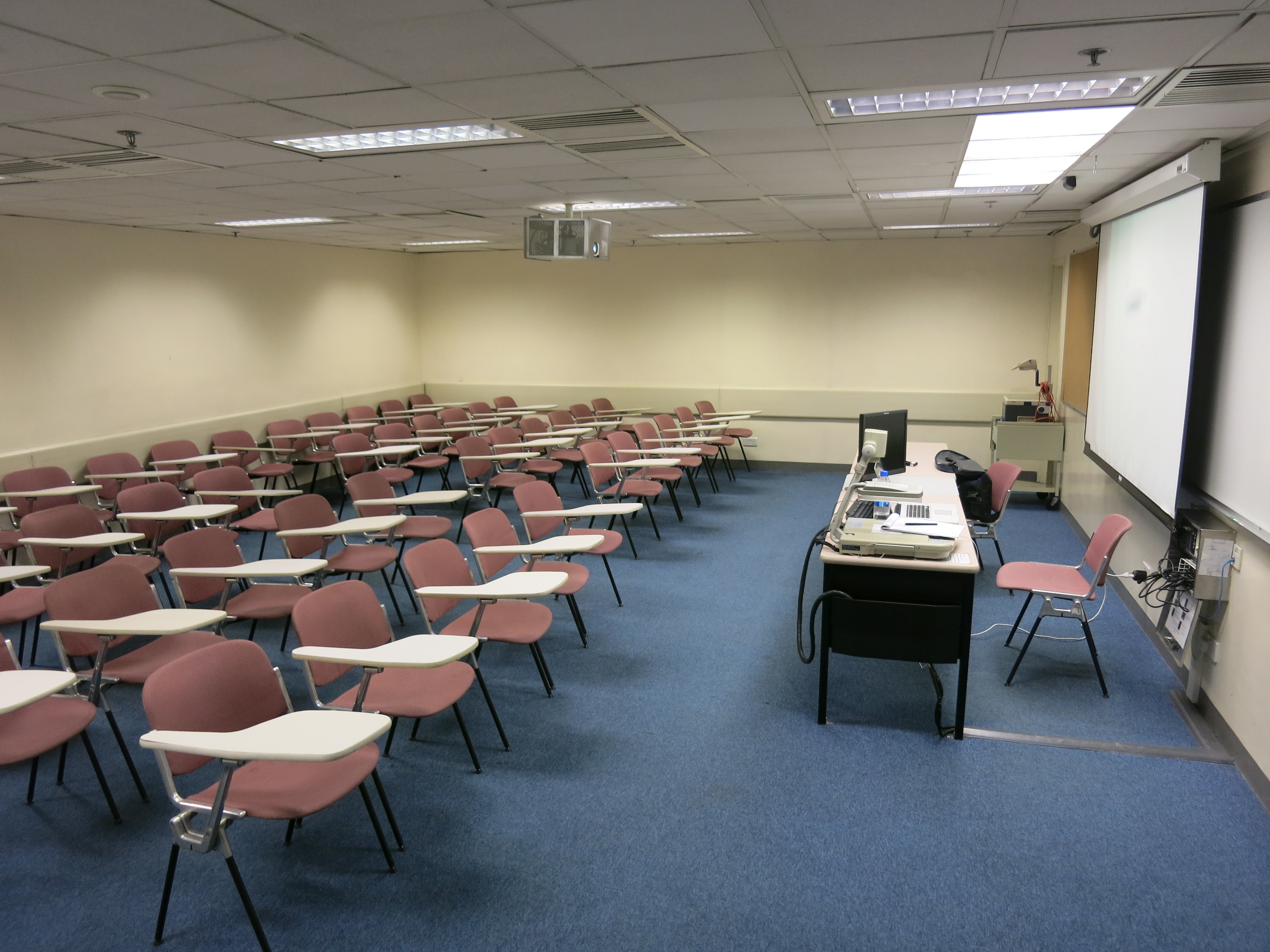
An empty classroom, shown without its expected occupants

Kane Parsons's found-footage Backrooms web series was adapted into an A24 feature film, released in 2026. The 2025 film Exit 8, directed by Genki Kawamura and based on the 2023 video game The Exit 8, has been discussed as an example of liminal-space horror.

Director Kyle Edward Ball said that, while developing his 2022 horror film Skinamarink, he looked at online communities including r/LiminalSpace and r/weirdcore. Severance creator Dan Erickson cited the Backrooms among the series' influences.

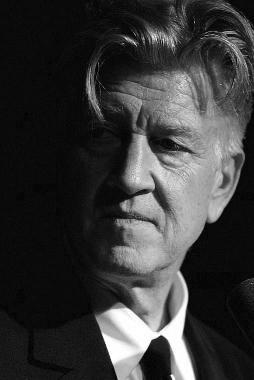
David Lynch in 2007

Use of liminal space in film predates the internet. The Overlook Hotel in The Shining, co-written and directed by Stanley Kubrick was intentionally designed by Kubrick to be physically illogical, with maze-like dead ends and overlapping rooms which make a floor-plan impossible to create. The hotel is often shot in intentionally close symmetry, creating an uncomfortable and cold atmosphere, almost demonstrating how the hotel sits out of the natural flow of time.

Director David Lynch is also cited as an early adopter of liminal space aesthetics, such as The Black Lodge, seen in the 1990 television series Twin Peaks and Lynch's 2006 experimental film Inland Empire. Notably, Inland Empire was shot entirely in standard-definition digital, on a Sony DSR-PD150.

Lynch's use of surrealist dream-like aesthetics demonstrate the connection that low fidelity digital filmmaking has with analog horror and liminal aesthetics. Owen Gleiberman of Variety citing Inland Empire as a progenitor to the 2026 psychological horror film Backrooms. Kane Parsons, director of Backrooms, in a 2025 interview with Collider, cited early exposure to Lynch's work as an influence on Backrooms and its aesthetics. As a child, his father, a fan of Lynch and Twin Peaks, decorated his home as the Black Lodge. Parsons states:

"He's an eccentric guy, and he decorated the entirety of the interior of this space in the house he was renting with those red curtains. It was the zigzag carpet. It was the Twin Peaks sort of […] I grew up kind of in that a little bit, literally that."

== See also ==
- Analog horror
- Dead mall
- Heterotopia (space)
- The Poolrooms
- Non-place
