= If Cats Disappeared from the World =

2016 Japanese drama film

- Poster

Japanese name
- Kanji: 世界から猫が消えたなら
Transcriptions
- Revised Hepburn: Sekai kara Neko ga Kieta nara
- Directed by: Akira Nagai
- Screenplay by: Yoshikazu Okada
- Based on: Sekai kara Neko ga Kieta nara by Genki Kawamura
- Produced by: Kei Haruna; Masaya Shibusawa
- Starring: Takeru Satoh; Aoi Miyazaki
- Cinematography: Shoichi Ato
- Edited by: Tsuyoshi Imai
- Music by: Takeshi Kobayashi
- Production companies: Hakuhodo DY Music & Pictures; Amuse Inc.; Shogakukan; Nippan Group Holdings; Sony Music Entertainment Japan; Gyao
- Distributed by: Toho
- Release date: May 14, 2016 (Japan)
- Running time: 103 minutes
- Country: Japan
- Language: Japanese
- Box office: US$4.7 million

If Cats Disappeared from the World (世界から猫が消えたなら, Sekai kara neko ga kietanara) is a 2016 Japanese fantasy drama film directed by Akira Nagai, starring Takeru Satoh and Aoi Miyazaki and based on the novel Sekai kara Neko ga Kieta nara by Genki Kawamura. It was released in Japan by Toho on May 14, 2016.

== Plot ==
An unnamed young man, living alone and working as a postman, is given a terminal diagnosis of brain cancer. As he despairs and wonders who will miss him when he dies, he returns home to find a doppelganger of himself, who claims to be the devil. The "devil" tells the man that if he agrees that one type of thing, chosen by the devil, will be removed from the world (as if it had never been), then the man can have another day of life instead of dying the next day.

The items are removed at the end of that day, giving the man one last day ostensibly to enjoy them before they disappear from the world. The story proceeds through successive days with new things being removed each day: after phones, then movies, clocks, and finally cats. The story focuses on the way in which the world is different for the man and his backstory without the removed items. Each of these is somehow crucial to his relationships with his few friends and family: an ex-girlfriend, a best friend who only knows how to interact with others through sharing movies, an acquaintance met in Buenos Aires, and most importantly, the man's late mother, whose cat he inherited.

The story is told both in the present and in a series of flashbacks, and the viewer comes to have a better understanding of the young man's relationships with family and friends, and the pain and beauty of mortality.

== Cast ==
- Takeru Satoh as Postman / Devil
- Aoi Miyazaki as She
- Gaku Hamada as Tsutaya
- Eita Okuno
- Anna Ishii as Mika
- Eiji Okuda
- Mieko Harada

== Reception ==
On its opening weekend at the Japanese box office, the film was third placed, with 141,691 admissions and ¥184.7 million in gross. On its second weekend, it was again third placed by admissions, with 104,440, and was second-placed by gross, with ¥141.4 million.

== See also ==
- The lyrics of "Fantasou Apla" by Greek artist Despina Vandi.
