= Ryunosuke Kimura =

Japanese theatre director (born 1983)

- 木村龍之介
- Born: 1983-07-11; Kusu, Ōita Prefecture, Japan
- Education: BA (The University of Tokyo)
- Occupations: Theatre director, dramatist
- Organization: Kakushinhan
- Known for: Staging Shakespeare

Ryunosuke Kimura (木村 龍之介, born 11 July 1983）is a Japanese theatre director and dramatist. He founded Theatre Company Kakushinhan. He is known for directing modernised Shakespeare productions.

== Early life ==
Ryunosuke Kimura was born on 11 July 1983 in Kusu, Ōita. According to Kimura, his parents experienced "Romeo and Juliet-like romance", but they separated after he was born. He spent his childhood in Osaka, Singapore, and Takarazuka. He studied English literature at the University of Tokyo, and it took 10 years to graduate from it.

== Career ==
After learning theatre at Sai-no-Kuni Saitama Arts Theater and Shakespeare Theatre, he started Kakushinhan in 2012, staging his own play Hamlet x Shibuya ~ Light, Was Our Revenge Tarnished?, an adaptation of Hamlet. Kimura says that the 2011 Tōhoku earthquake and tsunami was so shocking that he could not help finding hope in imagination and creativity, which prompted him to start the theatre company. This play was translated into English and published as a part of Re-imagining Shakespeare in Contemporary Japan: A Selection of Japanese Theatrical Adaptations of Shakespeare by the Arden Shakespeare in 2021.

After starting the company, Kimura mainly focuses on the original texts of Shakespeare, and staged various plays featuring Yamato Kochi as a lead.

In January 2016, Kakushinhan was selected as a "Promising Company" by Theater Fushikaden. This year, Kimura directed Julius Caesar, which attracted attention from young theatregoers in Tokyo and appreciated as "emotionally cathartic". In addition to Shakespeare productions in Tokyo, he directed The Taming of the Shrew in his hometown Kusu in 2016.

In 2018, he worked as an instructor in Hobonichi's Shakespeare Lecture Series 2018 with Shoichiro Kawai and Kazuko Matsuoka.

In 2025, he staged Natsuyume, an adaptation of A Midsummer Night's Dream, recreating Kayoko Shiraishi's face and voice by using AI.

In 2026, Kakushinhan staged Titus Andronicus: Reborn at the International Shakespeare Festival in Craiova.

== Style ==
Kakushinhan is described to "try to draw universality and entertainment by clashing Shakespeare into the modern world".

According to the International Shakespeare Festival in Craiova, Kimura's company Kakushin interprets Shakespeare's plays "as living texts that illuminate human emotion and existence today" by "rigorous textual interpretation". It modernises Shakespeare by utilising various performing arts and media, such as Noh, opera, dance, contemporary art, and AI tools.

== Works ==
- 2012: Hamlet x Shibuya ~ Light, Was Our Revenge Tarnished? (Shibuya Gallery LE DECO4)
- 2012: Romeo and Juliet on the Beach (Shibuya Gallery LE DECO4)
- 2013: Lear (Space Zatsuyu)
- 2014: A Midsummer Night's Dream: Kakushinhan Version (Space Zatsuyu)
- 2014: Titus Andronicus Without Honour and Humanity (Space Zatsuyu)
- 2014: Hamlet (Space Zatsuyu)
- 2015: Othello Black or White: Kakushinhan Version (Theater Green Big Tree Theater)
- 2015: The Taming of the Shrew (Shibuya Gallery LE DECO4)
- 2016: Julius Caesar: Kakushinhan Version (Theater Green Big Tree Theater)
- 2016: Richard III 1471-1485: Kakushinhan Version (Theater Fushikaden)
- 2016: Henry VI Trilogy (Theater Fushikaden)
- 2016: The Taming of the Shrew (Kusu Warabe no Yakata, Shinjuku Golden-gai Theater, Performing Gallery & Cafe Esorabako)
- 2017: Macbeth (Tokyo Metropolitan Theatre)
- 2017: A Midsummer Night's Dream (Theater Fushikaden)
- 2017: Titus Andronicus (Kichijoji Theater)
- 2017: Romeo and Juliet (Kusu Warabe no Yakata, Shinjuku Golden-gai Theater, Performing Gallery & Cafe Esorabako)
- 2018: Hamlet (Theater Green Big Tree Theater)
- 2018: The Winter's Tale (Nakano West End Studio)
- 2018: The Merchant of Venice (Harajuku VACANT)
- 2019: Hamlet x Shibuya ~ Light, Was Our Revenge Tarnished? , Staged Reading (Shibuya Gallery LE DECO4)
- 2019: The War of the Roses (Theater Fushikaden)
- 2019: Romeo and Juliet (Shibuya Gallery LE DECO3, Kusu Warabe no Yakata, Ikebukuro Atelier Fanfare)
- 2019: Macbeth: Digest (Ohori Park Nohgakudo)
- 2020: Romeo and Juliet: Love in the Time of CORVID (Streaming)
- 2021: The Hawk Princess
- 2021: Julius Caesar (Theater Fushikaden)
- 2021: Mishima Yukio in the Roman Empire, Staged Reading (Theater Fushikaden)
- 2022: King Lear (Matsumoto Citizen Theater)
- 2022: Hamlet (Theater Fushikaden)
- 2022: A Midsummer Night's Dream: Mini Version (Warehouse in OKS Kawaghuchi Campus)
- 2023: King Lear: Smartphones vs King Lear (Theater Fushikaden)
- 2023: A Midsummer Night's Dream: Concentrated Version (Warehouse in OKS Kawaghuchi Campus)
- 2023: Romeo and Juliet:Concentrated Version (Warehouse in OKS Kawaghuchi Campus)
- 2023: Julius Caesar: Concentrated Version (Warehouse in OKS Kawaghuchi Campus)
- 2023: Shin Titus Reborn (Warehouse in OKS Kawaghuchi Campus)
- 2025: Natsuyume (Kanagawa Art Theater)
- 2026: Titus Andronicus: Reborn (International Shakespeare Festival, Craiova)

== Bibliography ==
- Hamlet x Shibuya ~ Light, Was Our Revenge Tarnished?, in Tetsuhito Motoyama, Rosalind Fielding, Fumiaki Konno, ed., Re-imagining Shakespeare in Contemporary Japan: A Selection of Japanese Theatrical Adaptations of Shakespeare, The Arden Shakespeare, 2021.
- Shakespear for the 14-year-old, Yamato Shobo, 2024 (in Japanese).

== Links ==
- Studio Audubon (Japanese)
- Kakushinhan (Japanese)
