= Walking simulator =

Type of video game

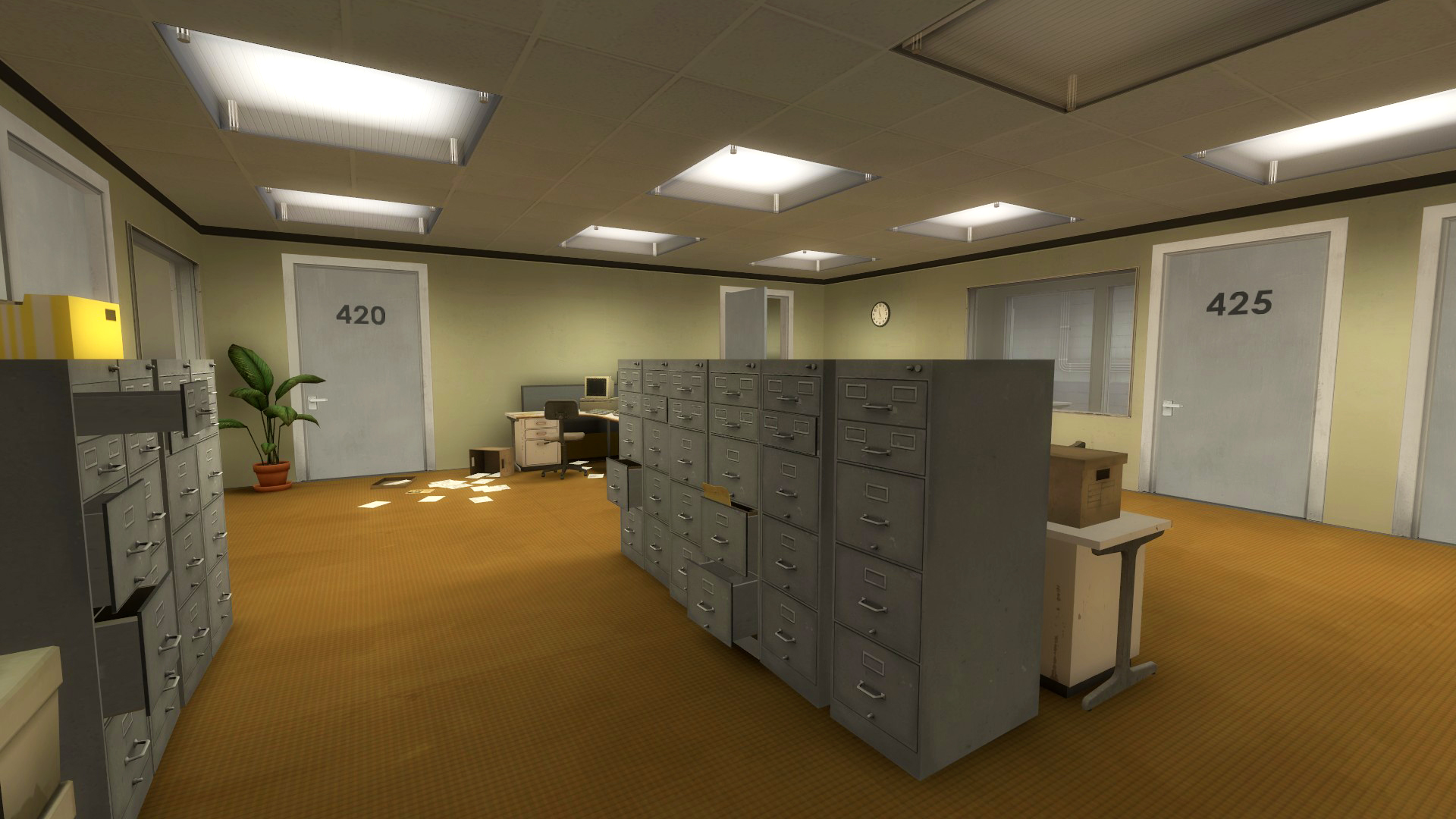
The Stanley Parable, an example of a walking simulator, in which the player explores an abandoned office and other environments

A walking simulator, shortened walking sim, is an adventure game that consists primarily of movement and environmental interaction. Walking sims generally do not have combat mechanics or traditional win/lose scenarios. While these video game elements originated in the 1980s, the term began to be used pejoratively to refer to new games as walking simulators in the late 2000s, notably with Dear Esther. The term was eventually used less pejoratively and adopted by gamers, while still being negatively perceived by some game developers and retaining negative gameplay connotation. Other descriptors have been commonly used for games of such style, including empathy, narrative, and exploration game. Such games are often a hallmark of art games, but some mainstream games have been described as having walking simulator elements.

The central elements of walking simulators are controversial due to purported lack of challenge, and discontent of such games became common in the mid-to-late 2010s among "hardcore" gamers. However, the artistic aspects and emphasis on decision-making and morality are appreciated and remain popular across other video games.

== Characteristics ==
=== Gameplay ===
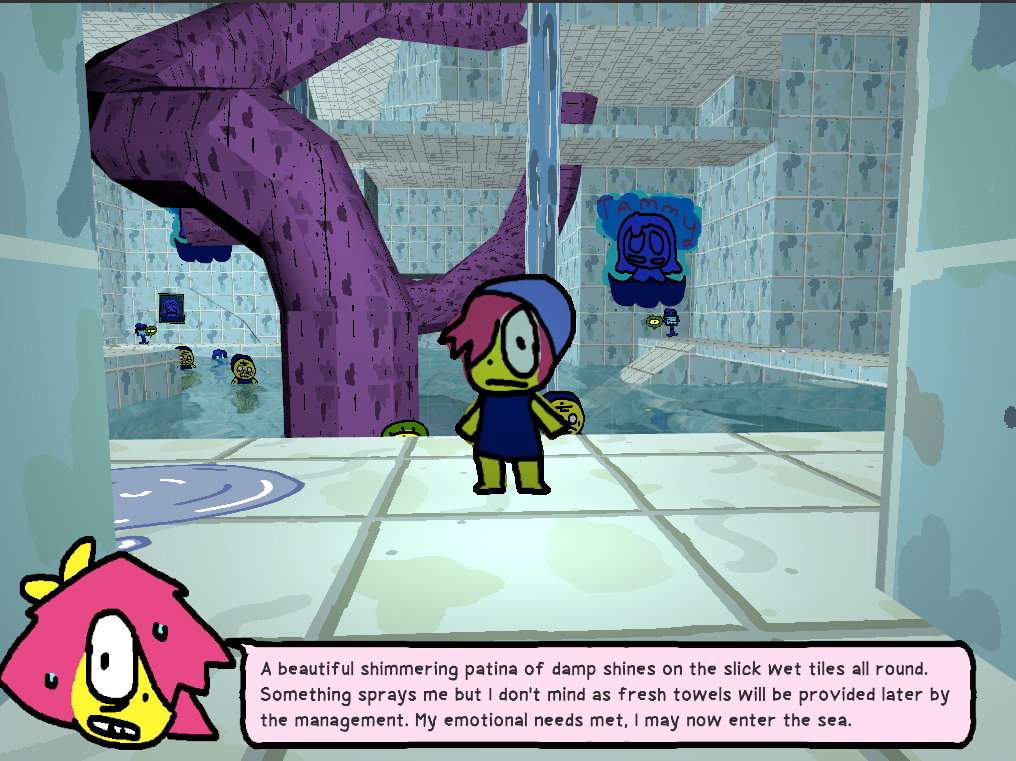
Anthology of the Killer, a game collection where the player controls a character named BB (pictured) to explore her surroundings.

Walking sims are centered around exploration, with the player being thrown into an unfamiliar environment that ranges from mundane to fantastical. The player uncovers aspects of that environment, gaining an understanding of who inhabits it and whether or not it is hostile. Most walking sims lack aspects such as combat, strategy, or economic systems. Most are also created by indie developers, although major titles such as Death Stranding have been referred to as walking sims.

Walking sims sometimes include horror game elements, adding tension to the exploration aspect. Though most survival horror games include combat and other actions the player can use to survive, some games–like Outlast and Paratopic–remove combat abilities, which leaves the player without any means to otherwise react to events. These games can be seen as walking simulators as they help to create an emotional response in their narrative by removing player agency to react to frightening events, combined with the ability to insert visual and audio cues designed to frighten the player. The Exit 8, a walking simulator inspired by the 2014 P.T. demo, requires players to walk down the same passage of a metro subway station repeatedly, turning around if they notice any differences in the passage from previous travels, creating a psychological horror experience for the player.

=== Naming ===
The name "walking simulator" often has negative connotations, implying that the gameplay is tedious and mundane. Critics, including Gamergate proponents and "hardcore" gamers, contend that walking sims are not "real games", asserting that games must include some sort of challenge or fail condition and that under this definition walking sims do not qualify as games.

Game developers–including Dan Pinchbeck, co-creator of Dear Esther–reject this narrow definition in favor of a more expansive and inclusive one. The initially pejorative term "walking simulator" was later embraced by fans, going so far as to be used as a description tag to help users find similar games on the Steam digital distribution service.

The term is sometimes used in an ironic manner. For example, Baby Steps by Bennett Foddy has been described as a "literal walking simulator" because the character must directly control the character's legs.

Fans and developers continue to debate whether the gaming community should continue to use the term, or switch to something else. Those in support point out the mental and health benefits of walking as a sign that it is not inherently derogatory as a genre label. Detractors characterize the label as dismissive and condescending, relating it to other insults like "social justice warrior", although some have expressed a feeling of inevitability that it would continue to be used for the foreseeable future.

== History ==
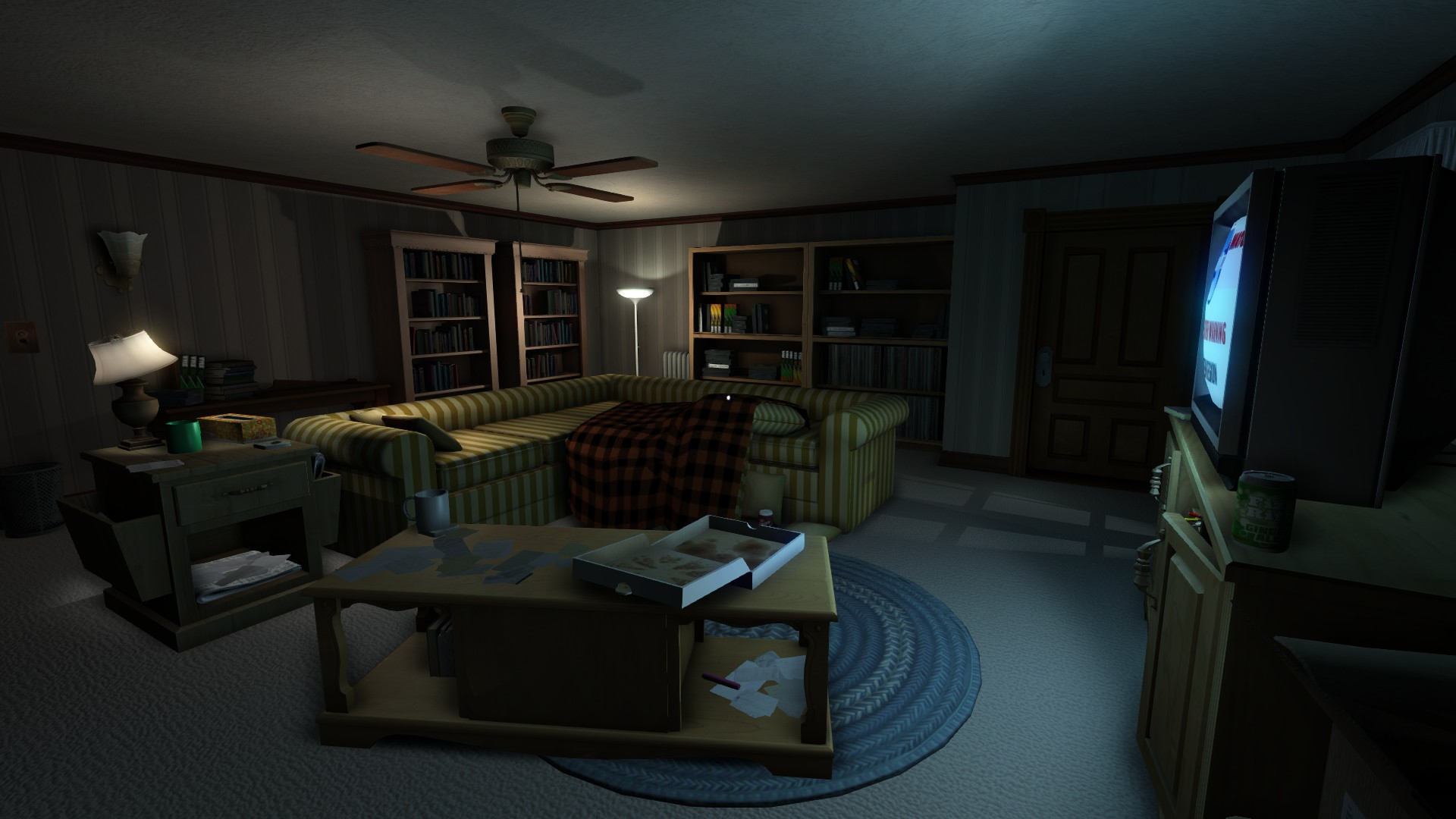
Gone Home has the player explore their character's family's new home, seemingly suddenly abandoned by their family, to discover clues and find out what has happened.

The first known walking simulator was an indie game, The Forest, developed as an orienteering simulation by Graham Relf for the ZX Spectrum in his spare time. Intended to be based around map-making and navigational skills, it allowed the player to navigate a vast virtual forest. It eventually received a commercial release, and was praised for its originality. A 1980s science fiction successor, Explorer, took place on a forested Earth-like planet and featured 40 billion procedurally generated individual locations, randomly combining graphical components. It also had a rudimentary combat system that allowed the player to shoot arrows at ghost-like creatures, as well as a form of fast travel via teleportation. However, the game was poorly reviewed by most outlets due to its slow pace, calling it more of a tech demo than a fully-fledged video game. Both Explorer and its predecessor were therefore considered commercial failures.

In 2003, [domestic], an art game developed by Mary Flanagan, reused first-person shooter environments to reconstruct a childhood memory of a fire. In 2004, Japanese developer Kikiyama released Yume Nikki, a game in which a girl explores dreams in her mind. In 2012, Dear Esther, a walking sim about exploring an unnamed island, was a breakout hit that popularized the modern incarnation of the walking simulator, receiving a large amount of positive critical acclaim. Despite receiving backlash, it was seen as a radical concept. Around the same period, several other minimalist exploration and narrative games helped establish the style as a recognizable genre, including Journey and Thirty Flights of Loving in 2012, followed by Proteus, The Stanley Parable and Gone Home in 2013. Gone Home was made by many of the team members of the DLC expansion BioShock 2: Minerva's Den, which featured an ending segment similar to walking simulators. Other notable games in the genre include The Vanishing of Ethan Carter in 2014, and, later, Firewatch in 2016. Walking sims started to be recognized by critics, with three of the 2016 BAFTA Games Award winners being walking simulators.

As walking sims rose in popularity, some gamers began to voice dissatisfaction with the emerging genre. Gamergate, beginning in 2014, added momentum to claims that walking sims are too "feminine" or "political" because they are generally story-focused, do not contain player combat, and often deal with themes such as race, class, and identity.

Beginning in the 2020s, several walking simulators that made use of the liminal space aesthetic were developed, including Anemoiapolis (2023), The Exit 8 (2023) and Pools (2024).

Walking simulations remain primarily a product of indie game developers. AAA studios have mostly refrained from creating walking sims, although there is a possibility that environments created for standard games could be reused without combat, as in the educational "Discovery Mode" of Assassin's Creed Origins and Odyssey.

== Reception ==
In 2017, Nicole Clark of Salon.com called walking sims "the most artful and innovative genre within video gaming", saying that it was "here to stay". In 2019, Rachel Watts of PC Gamer stated that walking sims "have challenged the way in how video games are played, experienced and defined", and that some of the criticism over their mechanics has begun to shift.

== See also ==
- Interactive storytelling
- Non-game
- Pace (narrative)
- Visual novel
- Wikipedia category for walking simulator games
