= Yamato Kochi =

Japanese actor (born 1978)

- 河内 大和
- Born: December 3, 1978 (age 47); Iwakuni, Yamaguchi Prefecture, Japan
- Occupation: Actor
- Years active: 2000–present
- Children: 1

Yamato Kochi (河内 大和, Kōchi Yamato; born December 3, 1978) is a Japanese actor.

== Career ==
Kochi was born in Iwakuni, Yamaguchi Prefecture, on December 3, 1978. After graduating from Yamaguchi Prefectural Iwakuni High School, he applied to enter Hokkaido University because he wanted to live in a snowy place. However, he failed the entrance exam. Kochi subsequently passed an exam and began studying civil engineering at Niigata University. In his fourth year at Niigata, he developed a passion for acting and dropped out of university.

He started his acting career at Niigata-City Performing Arts Center (Ryutopia) by performing in Shakespeare's play A Midsummer Night's Dream. Kochi's debuting role came in 2000 at another Shakespearean role, Richard III. In 2004, Kochi played Macbeth and Hamlet. After taking a break from acting, he lived with his family before returning to Niigata and, in 2010, moving to Tokyo. He played the title role of King Lear in Kakushinhan's production directed by Ryunosuke Kimura in 2013.

Kochi's passion for Shakespeare's works made him found G-GARAGE, a company whose aim was to pursue and promote Shakespearean works. In 2015, he played a role in The Two Gentlemen of Verona at an event organized by director Yukio Ninagawa in Saitama Prefecture and, in 2020, again under the direction of Ninagawa, in the play Henry VIII. In 2021, Kochi began working with playwright Hideki Noda.

Kochi's acting career outside theater became known in 2023 when he joined TBS Television's series Vivant. His breakthrough role in cinema came in the 2025 film Exit 8, which earned him praise and the award as the Newcomer of the Year at the 49th Japan Academy Film Prize.

== Personal life ==
Kochi is married and has a son. He likes soccer and played in regional tournaments in his youth.

Following his role as The Walking Man in the film Exit 8, Kochi said that his public life changed radically, pointing out that when he walks on the streets, people recognize him on the spot if he does not wear a hat. He added that while finding it embarrassing, he was happy that his son recognized the work of that role in his own way.

On April 8, 2026, Kochi flew to New York City to promote the movie's debut in North American theatres by appearing in New York City Subway stations between Fulton Street and Lexington Avenue–63rd Street in the role of The Walking Man.

== Selected roles ==
=== Filmography ===
Year	Title	Role	Notes	Ref
2025	Exit 8	The Walking Man	Breakthrough role	
2026	The Samurai and the Prisoner	Itami Ichirozaemon		

=== Television ===
Year	Title	Role	Notes	Ref
2023	Vivant	Wanizu		
2026	Brothers in Arms	Ujiie Naomoto	Taiga drama	
2026	Hakone Ekiden: Our Story	Tetsu Kuwana		

== Awards and nominations ==
Award	Date of ceremony	Category	Work	Result	Ref.
49th Japan Academy Film Prize	March 13, 2026	Newcomer of the Year	Exit 8	Won	

== External link ==
- Yamato Kochi at IMDb
