= Exit 8 (film) =

2025 Japanese film by Genki Kawamura

- Theatrical release poster
- Japanese: 8番出口
- Directed by: Genki Kawamura
- Screenplay by: Kentaro Hirase; Genki Kawamura
- Based on: The Exit 8 by Kotake Create
- Produced by: Kenji Yamada; Akito Yamamoto; Taichi Ito
- Starring: Kazunari Ninomiya; Yamato Kochi; Naru Asanuma; Kotone Hanase; Nana Komatsu
- Cinematography: Keisuke Imamura
- Edited by: Jimmy Liu
- Music by: Yasutaka Nakata; Shohei Amimori
- Production companies: Story Inc.; AOI Pro.
- Distributed by: Toho
- Release dates: 19 May 2025 (Cannes); 29 August 2025 (Japan)
- Running time: 95 minutes
- Country: Japan
- Language: Japanese
- Box office: $44 million

Exit 8 (Japanese: 8番出口, Hepburn: Hachiban Deguchi) is a 2025 Japanese mystery psychological horror film directed by Genki Kawamura, who co-wrote the screenplay with Kentaro Hirase. It is an adaptation of the 2023 video game The Exit 8 developed by Kotake Create. The film stars Kazunari Ninomiya as an unnamed man who is caught in a looping subway corridor and must spot possible anomalies in each loop to escape.

Exit 8 had its premiere at the Midnight Screenings of the 2025 Cannes Film Festival on 19 May, and was released in Japan by Toho on 29 August. The film received positive reviews from critics and has grossed ¥5.2 billion.

== Plot ==
While on a subway train, a man (credited only as the Lost Man) witnesses another man scolding a mother for failing to calm her crying baby. The Lost Man then receives a call from his ex-girlfriend, informing him that she is pregnant with his child and asking for his advice. He loses connection while trying to exit the station, and finds himself in a deserted, sterile, and seemingly endless looping corridor. Reading a set of instructions, the Lost Man learns that in order to escape, he must reach Exit 8 by turning back whenever the corridor has an anomaly, and moving forward when there is none. The anomalies he encounters range from bizarre events such as blood raining from the ceiling, to more subtle anomalies like eyes on posters tracking his movements. Any anomalies he misses return him to Exit 0, resetting his progress.

Upon reaching Exit 5, the Lost Man receives a call from his ex, who continues to implore him to help her reach a decision. He relays the altercation on the train that he had witnessed, recounting that nobody defended the woman, and tearfully confesses that his failure to stand up for her makes him feel unfit to be a father. His ex then appears in the corridor, revealing her to be an anomaly and thus sending him back to Exit 0. Upon realizing what happened, the Lost Man breaks down in frustration.

Eventually, the Lost Man meets the Boy, a small child who had been following the Walking Man, an unresponsive entity the Lost Man sees walking down the corridor in every loop. The Walking Man used to be similarly lost, but has seemingly become a part of the loop after abandoning the Boy for a false Exit 8. Although initially mute, the Boy proves highly perceptive; with his help, the Lost Man makes steady progress. The Boy gradually opens up to him, confessing that he ran away from his mother, and gives him a gastropod shell for good luck.

Upon reaching Exit 6, the corridor is suddenly flooded. After having a vision of himself, his ex, and the Boy (revealed to be their son) at a beach, the Lost Man tries to save the Boy, holding him above the water and comforting him before he himself is swept away. After regaining consciousness, the Boy turns the corner to Exit 8. The Lost Man appears a short while later; initially doubtful on whether it is the real Exit 8, he sprints toward it upon remembering the Boy's shell. This returns him to the real world, where he calls his ex, promising to meet her at the hospital. He enters the same crowded train he had taken earlier and once again witnesses the man berating the mother and her crying child. However, this time, the Lost Man turns to confront him.

== Cast ==
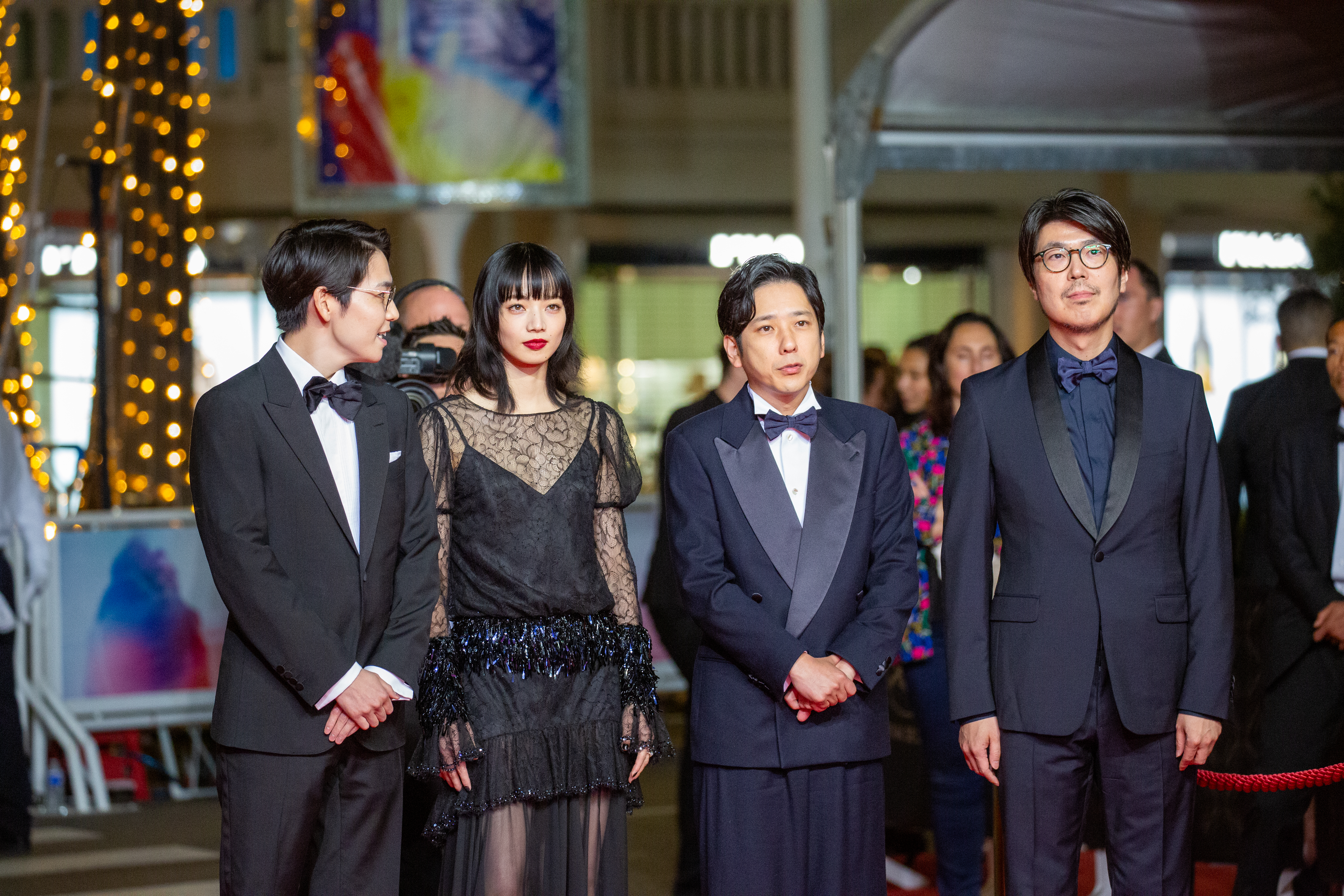
Cast and crew at the 2025 Cannes Film Festival

- Kazunari Ninomiya as The Lost Man
- Yamato Kochi as The Walking Man
- Naru Asanuma as The Boy
- Kotone Hanase as The High School Girl
- Nana Komatsu as The Woman

== Production ==
A live-action film based on The Exit 8 video game was announced by Toho on 27 December 2024, with Genki Kawamura set to write, produce and direct the film, starring Kazunari Ninomiya and Yamato Kochi as the "lost man" and "walking man", respectively. On 1 May 2025, it was announced that actress Nana Komatsu would be joining the cast. She was cast in a mysterious role with no official name or backstory revealed at the time.

Filming took place from late 2024 to early 2025 in Tokyo, mainly in a set that was built as a replica of the original game's underground passage.

Ninomiya was part of the production, credited with script cooperation. As a gamer himself, and knowing the game first hand, Ninomiya provided Kawamura with tips, which were useful in adapting a non-story game into a story. Ninomiya considered that in a production with many scenes featuring one person, filming would not progress smoothly if there were three directions to be taken from director, scriptwriter, and actor. In this particular production, costumes and setting remain the same, creating a loop. "That's why I felt it was necessary to organize things before filming so that there would be a single exit, and so when I was playing this role, I decided to get involved from the scriptwriting stage onwards," he said about his involvement.

=== Cut scene ===
Kawamura wrote in the novelization of the movie that he cut a scene before screening it at Cannes, because he thought that it was too scary to show. Among the parts of the scene that were cut (and reserved for a possible future "director's cut" version) are the backstory of "the Walking Man"; how "the Lost Man" could become a "Walking Man"; the reason for the photobooth and the pile of discarded items; a "Homeless Man". According to Polygon, who conducted an interview with Kawamura, the scene involves "the Lost Man" looking at the images from the photos in the dispenser, with the subject's face getting distorted after each set of photos dropped. The subject was him becoming a "Walking Man". Kawamura felt that making "the Lost Man" face the dreary reality of his repetitive, boring life was just as terrifying as facing supernatural terrors.

== Themes ==
Escher's work Möbius Strip II (Red Ants), which appears on one of the set of posters on the underground tunnel wall, is considered by some reviewers a metaphor for the life of the main character, and for the lives of the many other commuters in the film. The industrious ants walk their path on the figure of eight over and over again, but ultimately get nowhere and remain trapped on their path.

Ravel's musical work Boléro also features prominently throughout the film. The composition is best known for its unchanging ostinato rhythm, repeated 169 times, alongside the same melody stated again and again in the same key, mirroring the endless, cyclical nature of the game.

== Release ==
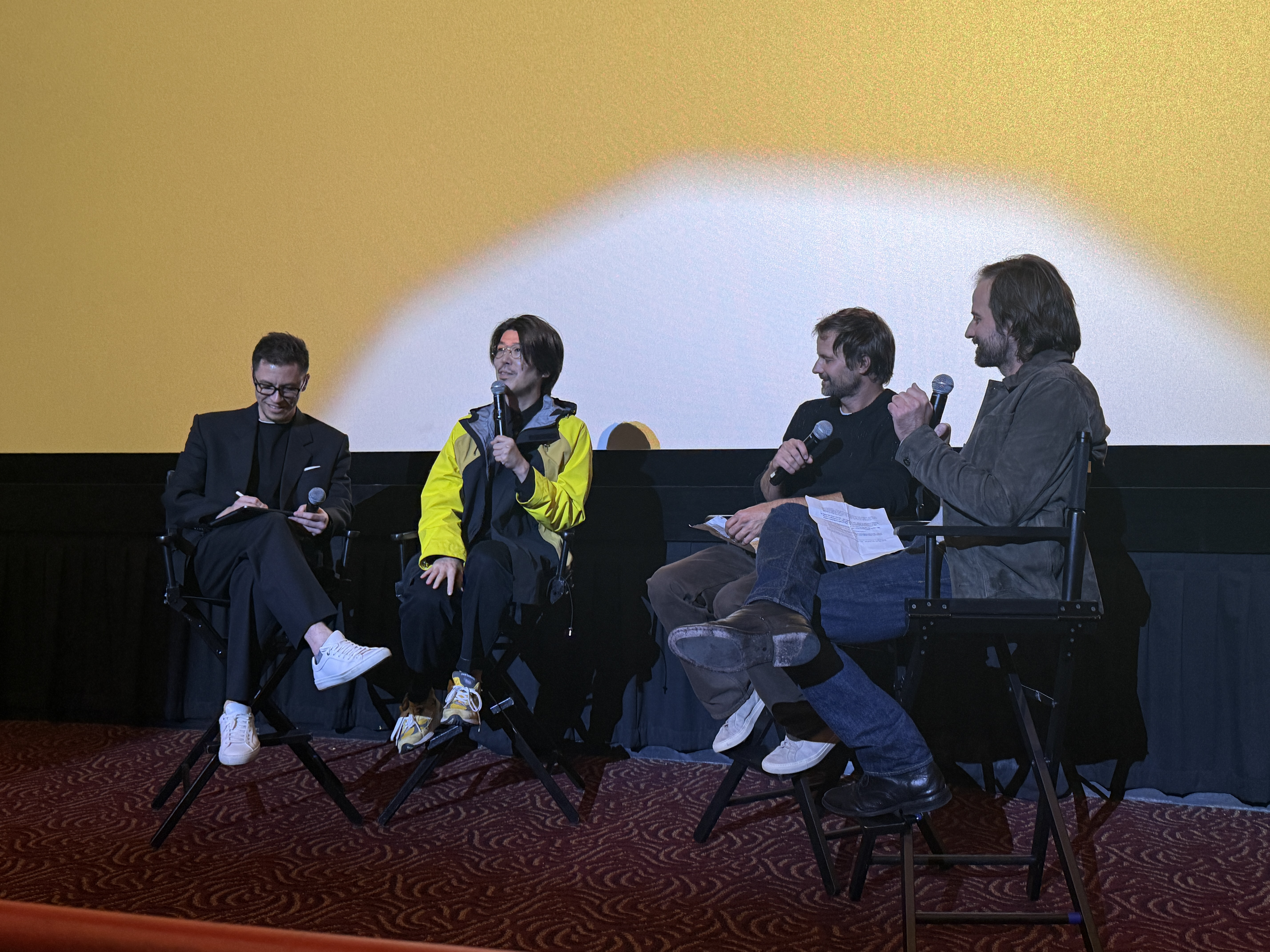
Kawamura (yellow jacket) and The Duffer Brothers at a Q&A event for Exit 8 in Century City, Los Angeles

The first teaser trailer was released internationally by Toho in March 2025. On 2 May 2025, it was announced that an eponymous novel would be published alongside the film, written by the director and writer Genki Kawamura. Exit 8 was selected to be screened out of competition at the 2025 Cannes Film Festival in May 2025. Following its debut at Cannes, Exit 8 was announced to be screening at many other film festivals such as the 58th Sitges Film Festival, 2025 Melbourne International Film Festival, 2025 Toronto International Film Festival,, the 30th Busan International Film Festival and 55th International Film Festival Rotterdam.

The film was released on 29 August 2025 in Japan, and throughout most of Europe, Asia and Canada during the rest of 2025. In August 2025, Neon acquired North American distribution rights to the film, planning to release it sometime in early 2026. Around the same time, CBI Pictures announced that the film would release in Indonesia on 10 September 2025. In February 2026, Neon announced the film would release in North American theatres on 10 April 2026.

The film was included among those to be screened in the horror genre festival Overlook Film Festival in New Orleans, United States. It was scheduled for 9 April 2026.

As part of the film's American promotions, Kochi appeared as The Walking Man at various New York City subway stations on 8 April 2026. Visitors who approached him and said a passphrase received a prize.

== Reception ==
=== Box office ===
Released on 29 August 2025, Exit 8 had the highest three-day opening for a live-action film in Japan for the year. It sold 672,000 tickets and earned over ¥960 million (approximately US$6.46 million). It debuted at #2 for the weekend, behind Demon Slayer: Kimetsu no Yaiba – The Movie: Infinity Castle.

The film has also had a solid opening run in international markets. It debuted as the #2 movie in Russia and Korea, as well as being in the top 10 in Turkey and Hong Kong. It has also been relatively successful in France. In South Korea, it debuted at #2 behind Chainsaw Man – The Movie: Reze Arc which had a cumulative audience of 186,107.

In the U.S., the film opened and remained for the first week of screening (April 10–16, 2026) on the 7th spot, continuing on the top 15 as of April 19. In Mexico, the film opened on April 22, reaching the 7th spot in its first weekend. According to the report, around 33,400 people saw it, with a gross income of 2.58 million MXN (around 148,000 USD) for the period.

=== Critical response ===
Metacritic review
breakdown (unweighted)

Positive
25 (81%)
Mixed
6 (19%)
Negative
0 (0%)

On the review aggregator website Rotten Tomatoes, 91% of 176 critics' reviews are positive, with an average rating of 7.2/10. The website's consensus reads: "An unsettling maze navigated with finesse by director Genki Kawamura, Exit 8 is a video game adaptation rendered with existential dread and stylistic sophistication." Metacritic, which uses a weighted average, assigned the film a score of 71 out of 100, based on 31 critics, indicating "generally favorable" reviews. It was the highest-rated film based on a video game on Rotten Tomatoes and Metacritic, overtaking Werewolves Within, until Zach Cregger's Resident Evil (2026) surpassed it.

Jonathan Romney from Screen International wrote "A rare game-based movie that actually has the feel of a game, with confoundingly tricky rules, Exit 8 should achieve solid cult status beyond Japan". Clarence Tsui from South China Morning Post gave it 3 stars out of 5, stating that "Genki Kawamura has turned a simple premise – in which a player is made to run repeatedly down a short underground passage to search for a way out – into a psychological thriller exploring a man's guilt and redemption".

=== Accolades ===
At the 2025 Cannes Film Festival, the film won an award for Best Poster Design. Additionally, the film received an eight-minute standing ovation during its premiere at the festival. The film also won Best Music for composers Yasutaka Nakata and Shouhei Amimori at the 58th Sitges Film Festival.

Award / Festival	Date of ceremony	Category	Recipient(s)	Result	Ref.
Cannes Film Festival	24 May 2025	Best Poster Design	Exit 8	Won	
Sitges Film Festival	18 October 2025	Best Feature Film	Exit 8	Nominated	
Sitges Film Festival	18 October 2025	Best Music	Yasutaka Nakata & Shouhei Amimori	Won	
TikTok Awards Japan	5 December 2025	Hit Film category	Exit 8	Won	
Japan Academy Film Prize	13 March 2026	Best Film Editing	Sakura Seya	Nominated	
Japan Academy Film Prize	13 March 2026	Newcomer of the Year	Yamato Kochi	Won	
Critics' Choice Super Awards	August 6, 2026	Best Superhero Movie	Exit 8	Nominated	
Critics' Choice Super Awards	August 6, 2026	Best Actor in a Superhero Movie	Kazunari Ninomiya	Nominated	
Fangoria Chainsaw Awards	October 25, 2026	Best International Movie	Exit 8	Won	

== See also ==
- List of films based on video games
