= Genki Kawamura =

Japanese film director and writer

- Genki Kawamura presenting the movie Suzume at the Berlinale 2023
- Born: March 12, 1979 (age 47); Yokohama, Japan
- Occupations: Film director, writer

Genki Kawamura (川村 元気, Genki Kawamura) is a Japanese film director and writer.

== Early life ==
Genki Kawamura was born in Yokohama in 1979. He graduated from the Faculty of Letters Department of Journalism at Sophia University.

== Career ==
=== Filmmaker ===
After graduating university, he started working at Toho, where he produced such films as Densha Otoko, Confessions, Akunin, Moteki, Wolf Children, and the Parasyte films.

In 2010, he was selected for The Hollywood Reporter's "Next Generation Asia",

In 2011, he became the youngest recipient of the Fujimoto Award, given to outstanding filmmakers.

He served as the creative director for the 2012 Louis Vuitton's CG movie LOUIS VUITTON –BEYOND–.

=== Writer ===
He published his first novel, "If Cats Disappeared from the World", in 2012. The book was nominated for the Japan Booksellers' Award, became a huge bestseller with over 700,000 copies sold, and was made into a film starring Takeru Satoh and Aoi Miyazaki.

In 2013, he published the first picture book of the "Tinny the Balloon Dog" series, co-authored with art director Kenjiro Sano, which was made into an anime adaptation by NHK, named "Tinny: The Story of a Balloon Dog".

Other works include the picture book "Moom (ムーム)" (2014) co-authored with illustrator Yūki Mashiko, which was later animated by Tonko House; "Work. (仕事。)" (2014), a collection of dialogues about work with 12 people including Yoji Yamada, Kotaro Sawaki, Hiroshi Sugimoto, Sō Kuramoto, Yasushi Akimoto, Hayao Miyazaki, Shigesato Itoi, Kishin Shinoyama, Shuntaro Tanikawa, Toshio Suzuki, Tadanori Yokoo, and Ryuichi Sakamoto; and his second novel, "Milion Dollar Man (or Billion Dollar Man)", which was serialized in Brutus magazine, later adapted into a movie.

His 2024 novel My Horse (私の馬 ) was translated by Chikako Kobayashi as The Horse and I in 2026.

== Filmography ==
- 2012: Wolf Children (おおかみこどもの雨と雪, Ōkami Kodomo no Ame to Yuki) (Producer)
- 2015: The Boy and the Beast (バケモノの子 Bakemono no ko) (Producer)
- 2016: Your Name (君の名は Kimi no na wa) (Producer)
- 2016: If Cats Disappeared from the World (世界から猫が消えたなら Sekai kara neko ga kietanara) (Drehbuch)
- 2018: Mirai (未来のミライ Mirai no mirai) (Producer)
- 2018: Duality (Director)
- 2019: Weathering with You (天気の子 Tenki no Ko) (Producer)
- 2021: Belle (竜とそばかすの姫 Ryū to Sobakasu no Hime) (Producer)
- 2022: A Hundred Flowers (百花 Hyakka) (Director)
- 2022: Suzume (すずめの戸締まり Suzume no Tojimari) (Producer)
- 2023: Monster (怪物 Kaibutsu) (Producer)
- 2025: Exit 8 (8番出口 8-Ban deguchi) (Director, Writer)
