= Melody (given name) =

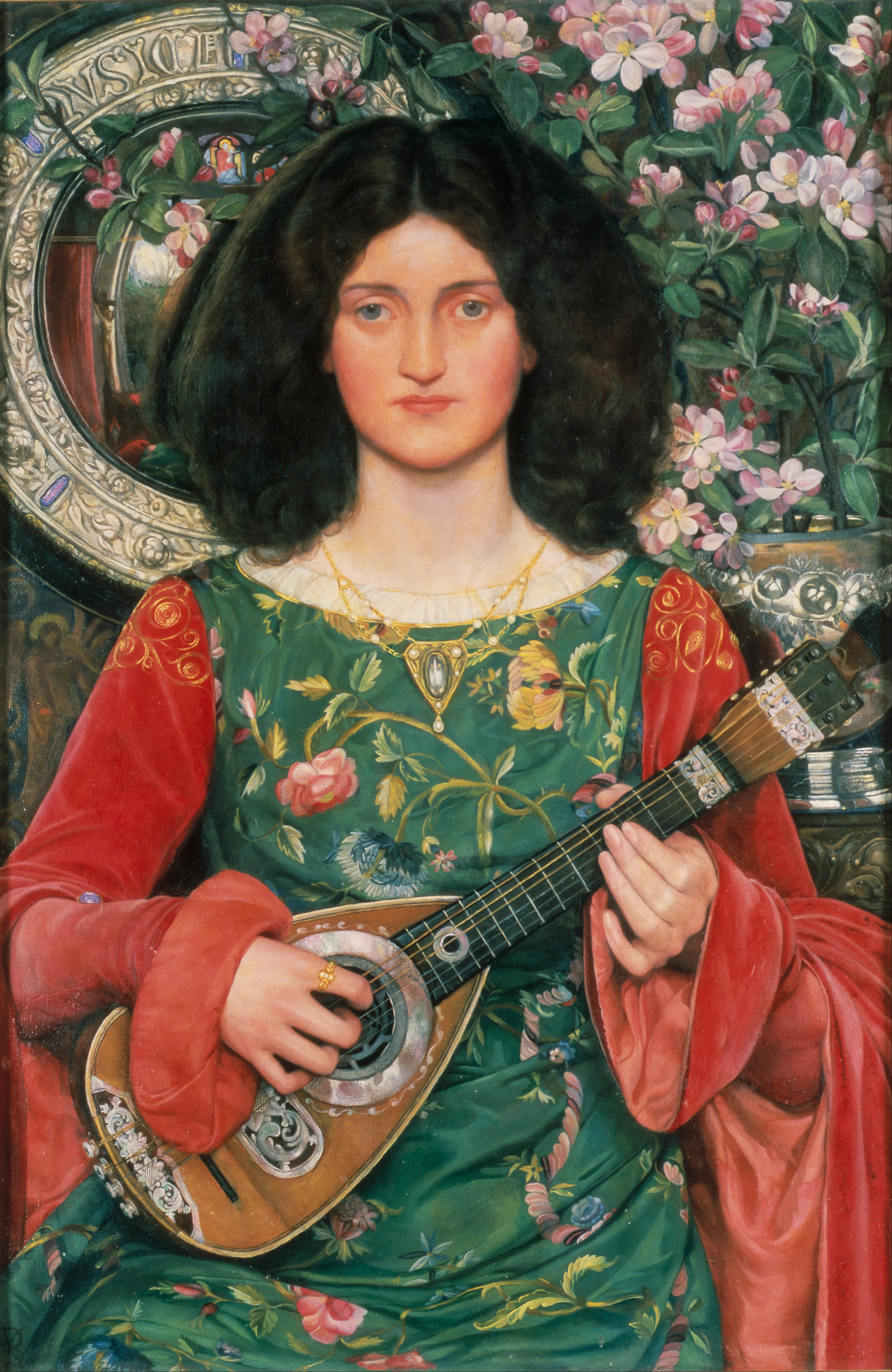
- Melody by Kate Elizabeth Bunce.
- Pronunciation: MEL-uh-dee
- Gender: Female
- Language: English

Origin
- Origin: English via Greek
- Meaning: melody

Melody is a modern English feminine given name taken from the vocabulary word melody, which is ultimately derived from the Greek μελῳδία, melōidía, "singing, chanting").

== Popularity ==
The name has been among the top one thousand names for girls in the United States since 1942 and was the 103rd most popular name for American girls in 2023. It has been increasing in popularity in the English-speaking world in recent years. It has been among the top five hundred names for girls in England and Wales since 2003 and among the top three hundred names since 2010. It has also been well used in France and the Netherlands.

Variants in use include the French Mélodie and Mélody and English spelling variants Mellody, Melodee, Melodey, Melodi, Melodie, and Melodii.

== Notable people ==
=== Given name ===
- Melody Anderson (born 1955), Canadian-American actress and social worker
- Melody Barnes (born 1964), American lawyer and political advisor
- Melody Beattie (born 1948), American self-help author
- Melody Brown (born 1984), American musician; member of the classical piano ensemble The 5 Browns
- Melody Carlson (born 1956), American author
- Melody Chan, American mathematician and violinist
- Melody Cooper (born 1983), New Zealand field hockey player
- Melody Currey (1950–2022), American politician
- Melody Davidson (born 1962/1963), Canadian ice hockey coach
- Melody Diachun (born 1968), Canadian singer, songwriter, and recording artist
- Melody Ding, Australian associate professor, scientist, and medical researcher
- Melody Ehsani (born 1980), American fashion designer
- Melody Eötvös (born 1984), Australian composer of classical music
- Melody Fairchild (born 1973), American long distance runner
- Melody Falcó (born 1975), Mexican professional tennis player
- Melody Francis (born 1988), Australian professional squash player
- Melody Gardot (born 1985), American musician
- Melody Gersbach (1985–2010), Filipino-German model and beauty pageant titleholder
- Melody Gilbert, American independent documentary filmmaker, and educator
- Melody Goodman, American biostatistician
- Melody Green, American wife of Christian musician Keith Green
- Melody Gudzowaty (born 1989), Dominican-Spanish model and beauty pageant contestant
- Melody Harris-Jensbach (born 1961), Korean-American business executive
- Melody Hernandez (gymnast) (born 1990), Australian artistic gymnast
- Melody Hernandez (politician), American politician
- Melody Horrill (born 1968), British-Australian journalist and author
- Melody Hossaini (born 1984), Iranian-born Swedish social entrepreneur, professional speaker, and personal development trainer- and coach
- Melody J. Stewart (born 1962), American lawyer and judge
- Mélody Johner (born 1984), Swiss equestrian
- Mélody Julien (born 1999), French long-distance runner
- Melody Kay (born 1979), American actress
- Melody Klaver (born 1990), Dutch actress
- Melody Lacayanga, American contestant on So You Think You Can Dance
- Melody Le Moal, French contestant on Dancing on Ice
- Melody Licious (born 1979), American heavy metal bass guitarist, newspaper writer, music show co-host, and bar co-owner
- Melody McCray-Miller (1956–2026), American politician
- Melody Mennite (born 1983), American professional ballet dancer
- Melody Miller (1945–2022), American political staffer
- Melody Millicent Danquah (1937–2016), Ghanaian pilot
- Melody Moezzi (born 1979), Iranian-American writer and attorney
- Melody Nurramdhani Laksani (born 1992), Indonesian member of girl group JKT48
- Melody Oliveria (born 1988), American video blog contributor
- Melody Patterson (1949–2015), American actress and singer
- Melody Perkins (born 1974), American actress, model, and dancer
- Melody Pool, Australian country-folk musician
- Melody Prochet (born 1987), French musician
- Melody Rose, American academic administrator
- Melody Sucharewicz (born 1980), German-born Israeli TV show winner, and former foreign affairs adviser and spokesperson
- Melody Swartz (born 1969), American professor and vice dean
- Melody Sze, American mezzo-soprano singer, voice teacher, and singing coach
- Melody Tan (born 1993), Malaysian singer
- Melody Teo (born 1991), Singaporean netball player
- Melody Thomas Scott (born 1956), American actress
- Melody Thornton (born 1984), American singer and television personality; past member of the girl group and dance ensemble The Pussycat Dolls
- Melody Trolly, Canadian candidate in the Family Coalition Party of Ontario candidates in the 2003 Ontario provincial election
- Melody Yeung (bowler) (born 1960/1961), Hong Kong ten-pin bowler

=== Surname ===
- Tony Melody (1922–2008), English actor

=== Stage name ===
- Melody (Belgian singer) (born 1977), Belgian singer
- Melody (Brazilian singer) (born 2007), Brazilian singer
- Melody (actress) (born 1982), Burmese actress
- Melody (Japanese singer) (born 1982), Japanese singer
- Melody (Spanish singer) (born 1990), Spanish singer
- Projekt Melody, American live streamer

== Fictional characters ==
- Melodie the Music Fairy, in the book franchise Rainbow Magic
- Melody, in the 2015 puzzle video game Angry Birds 2
- Melody, in the manga series Hunter × Hunter, voiced by Tarako Isono and Miina Tominaga (Japanese); Dorothy Elias-Fahn (English)
- Melody, in the UK TV soap opera EastEnders, played by Lyanne Compton
- Melody, in the US animated TV series My Little Pony Tales, voiced by Kelly Sheridan
- Melody Bell, in the UK medical soap opera Doctors, played by Elizabeth Bower
- Melody Jones, in the Australian TV soap opera Home and Away, played by Celeste Dodwell
- Melody Jones, in the Australian TV soap opera Neighbours, played by Robyn Arthur
- Melody Locus, in the US animated science fiction superhero comedy TV series My Life as a Teenage Robot
- Melody Longford, in the UK soap opera Hollyoaks, played by Sandy Hendrickse
- Melody-Melody, in the 1994 Peanuts special You're in the Super Bowl, Charlie Brown, voiced by Crystal Kuns
- Melody Mouse, in the Mickey Mouse universe
- Melody Pendras, in the US supernatural horror Netflix TV series Archive 81 and in the podcast on which it is based, played by Dina Shihabi
- Melody Pianissima, a character in the 2001 video game Luigi's Mansion
- Melody Piper, in the fashion doll franchise Ever After High, voiced by Laura Bailey
- Melody Pond, aka River Song, in the UK science fiction TV series Doctor Who, played by Alex Kingston (adult), Harrison and Maddison Mortimer, Sydney Wade, Maya Glace-Green, and Nina Toussaint-White (baby to young adult)
- Melody Robbins, in the New Zealand sitcom Melody Rules, played by Belinda Todd
- Melody Valentine (aka Melody Jones), in the Josie and the Pussycats franchise, voiced by Jackie Joseph (speaking voice) and Cheryl Ladd (singing voice)
- My Melody, in the Sanrio franchise
- Princess Melody, in the Walt Disney 2000 animated musical fantasy adventure film The Little Mermaid II: Return to the Sea, voiced by Tara Strong
- Melody Brooks, a character in the book and 2024 film Out of My Mind.
