= Melody (disambiguation) =

A melody is a series or progression of musical notes over time.

Melody or Melodies may also refer to:

== People ==
=== People with the given name ===
- Melody Anderson (born 1955), Canadian-American actress and social worker
- Melody Barnes (born 1964), Director of the Domestic Policy Council for Barack Obama's administration
- Melody Beattie (born 1948), self-help author
- Melody Brown (born 1984), musician, member of the musical ensemble The 5 Browns
- Melody Chan, American mathematician
- Melody Currey (1950–2022), American politician
- Melody Gardot (born 1985), American musician
- Melody Harris-Jensbach (born 1961), Korean-American manager, deputy CEO and member of the board of Puma
- Melody Horrill (born 1968), weather presenter and reporter with Seven News in Adelaide
- Mélody Johner (born 1984), Swiss equestrian
- Melody Kay (born 1979), American actress
- Melody Lacayanga, dancer from So You Think You Can Dance
- Melody McCray-Miller (1956–2026), Democratic member of the Kansas House of Representatives
- Melody Perkins (born 1974), actress
- Melody Thomas Scott (born 1956), American actress known for playing "Nikki" on The Young and the Restless
- Melody Thornton (born 1984), member of the Pussycat Dolls
- Melody Nurramdhani Laksani (born 1992), Indonesian actress
- Melody Prima (born 1995), Indonesian actress

=== People with the surname ===
- Tony Melody (1922–2008), English actor

=== People with the stage name ===
- Melody (Belgian singer), Nathalie Lefebvre (born 1977), Belgian singer
- Melody (Brazilian singer), Gabriella Abreu Severino (born 2007), Brazilian singer
- Melody (actress) (born 1982), Burmese actress
- Melody (Japanese singer), stylized as "melody.", Melody Ishihara (born 1982), Japanese pop singer
- Melody (Spanish singer), Melodía Ruiz Gutiérrez (born 1990), Spanish singer

== Arts, entertainment, and media ==
=== Fictional characters ===
- Melody (Hunter × Hunter), a character from the manga series Hunter × Hunter
- Melody Valentine (also known as Melody Jones), a character in the Josie and the Pussycats franchise
- Princess Melody, a character from the Walt Disney film The Little Mermaid II: Return to the Sea

=== Film, stage, and television ===
- Melody (1953 film), a Disney animated film
- Melody (1971 film), a British film, also titled S.W.A.L.K.
- Melody (2014 film), a Belgian drama film
- Melody (2015 film), a Kannada-language film
- Melody (2023 film), a Tajik-Iranian mystery drama film
- Melody (musical), a musical by Sigmund Romberg, Edward Childs Carpenter, and Irving Caesar
- Melody (TV series), a British animated children's television series
- "Melody" (The Gentle Touch), a 1980 television episode

=== Music ===
==== Albums ====
- Melodies (album), by Tatsuro Yamashita, released in 1983
- Melody (Joy Electric album), 1994
- Melody (Sharleen Spiteri album), 2008
- Melody (soundtrack), for the 1971 film Melody
- Melodies, a 1977 album by Jan Hammer Group
- Melody, a 2010 EP by Never Shout Never

==== Songs ====
- "Melodies", by Madison Beer, 2013
- "Melodies" (song), by GAM, 2006
- "Melody" (Masaharu Fukuyama song), 1993
- "Melody" (Sigala song), 2022
- "Melody", by Lost Frequencies from the 2019 album Alive and Feeling Fine
- "Melody (Sounds Real)", by Ayaka, 2006
- "Melody", by Serge Gainsbourg from the 1971 album Histoire de Melody Nelson
- "Melody", by The Rolling Stones from the 1976 album Black and Blue
- "Melody", by Arash from the 2012 album Superman
- "Melody", by Steve Perry from the 1998 album Greatest Hits + Five Unreleased
- "Melody", by Andy Gibb from the 1978 album Shadow Dancing
- "Melody", a 2015 song by Oliver Heldens
- "Melody", by Blonde Redhead from the 2004 album Misery Is a Butterfly
- "Melody" (Skoryk), a musical composition Myroslav Skoryk

=== Print and online media ===
- Melody (magazine), a Japanese shōjo and josei manga magazine published by Hakusensha
- Melody (radio station), a Malaysian radio station
- Melody, a 1966 novel by V. C. Andrews
- Melody, a blog engine that forked from Movable Type
- Melody 105.4 FM, a radio station in London later rebranded Magic 105.4
- Melody Radio (Bulgaria), a radio station
- Melody TV network owned by Ethnic Channels Group, including: Melody Aflam, Melody Drama and Melody Hits

== Other uses ==
- Melody 34, a French sailboat design
- Melody (building), building in Miami, Florida, United States
- Melody (grape), a type of wine grape
- Melody potato, a potato cultivar
- MSC Melody, an Italian cruise ship that repelled pirates in April 2009
- Discos Melody, former name of Fonovisa Records
- Melody (given name)

== See also ==
- Melodia (disambiguation)
- My Melody (disambiguation)
- Melodi (disambiguation)
