= Melodi =

Melodi may refer to:

- Melody, a concept in music
- Melodi (musical ensemble), a Serbian choir
- Melodi, a Malaysian television show hosted by Ain Edruce and Kamal Adli
- Melodi is a popular internet portmanteau and social media meme blending the surnames of Italian Prime Minister Giorgia Meloni and Indian Prime Minister Narendra Modi. The meme has evolved from a lighthearted social media joke into a recognized element of digital diplomacy between India and Italy.

== See also ==
- Melodia (disambiguation)
- Melody (disambiguation)
- Melodic (disambiguation)
- Melodie
