= 3 nach 9 =

German talk show produced and aired by Radio Bremen since 1974

- Genre: Talk show
- Presented by: Giovanni di Lorenzo; Judith Rakers
- Countries of origin: West Germany (1974–1990); Germany (1990–present)
- Original language: German

Production
- Production locations: Bremen, Germany
- Running time: 120 min

Original release
- Network: Radio Bremen TV/NDR Fernsehen
- Release: November 19, 1974 – present

3 nach 9 is the oldest running German television talk show. The programme is produced on behalf of Radio Bremen and runs every four weeks on Fridays from 22:00 to 0:00 on Radio Bremen TV. NDR Fernsehen, hr-fernsehen and rbb Fernsehen also broadcast the live programme, 3sat repeats the programme ten days after the first broadcast.

The programme has been hosted by Giovanni di Lorenzo since 1989, together with Judith Rakers since 3 September 2010.

== History ==
3 nach 9 is broadcast from Bremen, for the first time on 19 November 1974. The start of III after 9, because the name was changed years later as well as the conception, ran in the common third television program of Norddeutscher Rundfunk (NDR) and Radio Bremen (RB) and (at that time still) Sender Freies Berlin (SFB). The "III" also stood for the fact that three presenters were present at the same time, so that the actors, the invited as well as the audience in the hall, could choose the one they liked most and vice versa.

The Frankfurter Rundschau wrote on the occasion of the programme's 30th anniversary: "In the first few years, it was decided on a case-by-case basis when the credits would start – in the immediate vicinity of the presenters and the audience, because the director and editors were sitting directly in the studio and could also be seen in the picture from time to time." The FR author continues: "The production conditions were made visible, and this transparency alone was extraordinary in a medium that sought to perfect the illusion, at least in the entertainment sector" – the programme was perceived as unconventional, unemotional and spontaneous.

This new format was based entirely on an idea of the then newly appointed RB programme director Dieter Ertel. This, as a pioneer of television documentary film at the Süddeutscher Rundfunk in Stuttgart, had been honoured journalistically and wanted an "anti-magazine", live and direct, alive with surprises and the presence of mind of the participants. By no means was the TV format of the "talk show", freshly imported from the US at the time, adopted. This editorial team pursued its very own ideas – others called the result a "talk show".

Journalistic television critics were unanimously enthusiastic about it. The jurors of the Grimme-Preis awarded Alfred Mensack and Michael Leckebusch their bronze medals in 1976. In 2004, Harald Keller assessed the appearance completely differently: "... 3 nach 9 is one irrelevant personality talk show among many. If controversies arise between the guests, the presenters Amelie Fried and Giovanni di Lorenzo often suffocate them in the beginning for the sake of a harmonious chat".

== Hosts ==
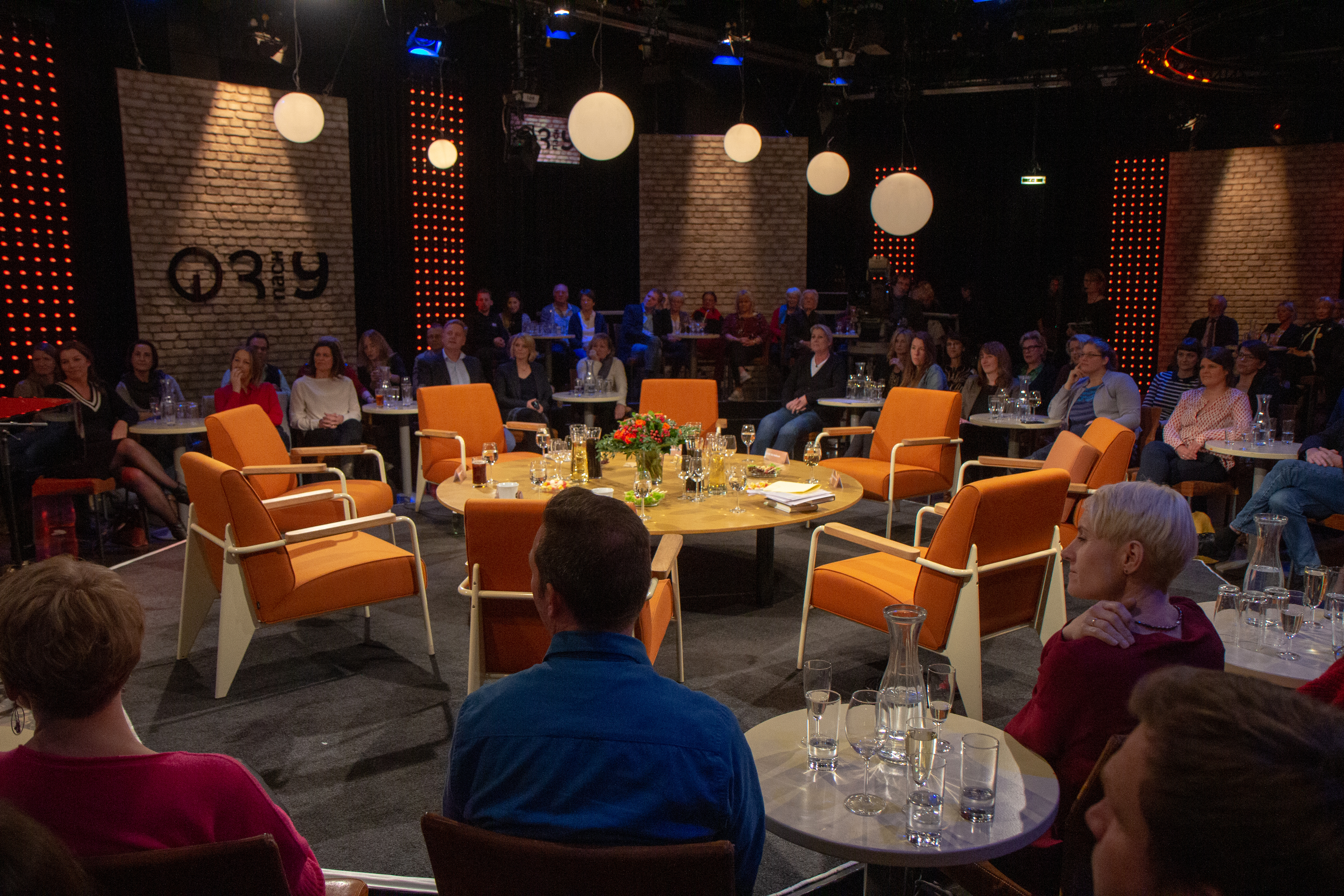
Studio set of 3 nach 9 (2018)

- Wolfgang Menge (1974–1982)
- Marianne Koch (1974–1982)
- Gert von Paczensky (1974–1975)
- Karl-Heinz Wocker (1975–1982)
- Carmen Thomas (1975–1977)
- Lea Rosh (1982–1989)
- Dagobert Lindlau (1982–1989)
- Günther Nenning (1982–1989)
- Wolfgang Hagen (1986)
- Juliane Bartel (1989–1998)
- Randi Crott (1989–1991)
- Ilja Richter (1989–1990)
- Giovanni di Lorenzo (1989–present)
- Gaby Hauptmann (End of the 90s)
- Charlotte Roche (2009–2010)
- Amelie Fried (1999–2009)
- Judith Rakers (2010–present)

From 26 February 2010, Giovanni di Lorenzo hosted the following six programmes with alternating co-hosts. These were Sandra Maischberger, Annette Dasch, Maria Furtwängler, Katrin Bauerfeind, Judith Rakers and Sarah Wiener. On 13 May 2011, Margot Käßmann replaced Judith Rakers, who was needed for the Eurovision Song Contest 2011, in the programme. On the occasion of the 40th anniversary on 14 November 2014, Maria Furtwängler led the programme alongside Rakers and di Lorenzo.

The pianist Gottfried Böttger accompanied 3 nach 9 from the first show with improvisations on the piano. In the last years he spent the breaks in between chatting with the television viewers. After 40 years Böttger said goodbye to the programme in the anniversary edition.

== Trivia ==
Sensation was caused when on February 19, 1982, the former leading member of the 2 June Movement Fritz Teufel and the then Federal Minister of Finance Hans Matthöfer (SPD) were among the guests on the programme. During a discussion with the moderator about good behaviour, Teufel pulled a water pistol and sprayed the minister with magic ink. Matthöfer reacted by pouring a glass of wine over Teufel.

On 9 March 1984 the brothel boss Karl-Heinz Germersdorf from Hanover together with his third Thai wife and his lawyer was a guest on the talk show. He fought a verbal battle with the politician Herta Däubler-Gmelin and the feminist and author Gerlinde Schilcher. During the show, Schilcher tipped a glass of wine down Germersdorf's neck. The talk show became known as "Thaimädchen-Eklat".

Franz Schönhuber was one of the guests on the programme on 22 June 1990. At that time, he had recently resigned from the chairmanship of the Republicans. In front of the glass studio, demonstrators tried to prevent Schönhuber from performing, throwing stones at the studio windows (causing one window to break) and interrupting the transmission. Meanwhile, peaceful demonstrators held up signs with criticism of Schönhuber to the discs. The studio itself was shielded by police units. At times, due to all these circumstances, it was discussed within the show itself with guests and partly also spectators whether and to what extent one could continue the current show in this situation. Some of the demonstrators also spoke briefly. The singer Anja Silja, who was also a guest, left the programme early because of the unclear situation.

In 2009, Middle East expert and journalist Peter Scholl-Latour clashed with Israeli public relations manager Melody Sucharewicz in a heated discussion. The point of contention was the Israeli Gaza War, which had just been ignited. Scholl-Latour felt "trapped" and wrongly pushed into an anti-Israeli corner that he would not represent. He had previously criticised Israel's Palestinian policy; Sucharewicz contradicted vigorously. The moderators di Lorenzo and Fried were later publicly sharply criticised for their passivity and their behaviour toward Scholl-Latour.
