= Archive 81 (podcast) =

Horror podcast

- Genre: Analog horror podcast; Science fiction podcast; Investigative journalism podcast; Paranormal horror
- Language: English

Production
- Length: 15–30 Minutes

Technical specifications
- Audio format: Radio drama; Scripted fiction podcast; Found-footage podcast

Publication
- No. of seasons: 3
- No. of episodes: 35
- Original release: April 16, 2016-June 5, 2019
- Provider: Dead Signals

Related
- Related shows: Lore; The Black Tapes; Limetown
- Adaptations: Archive 81 (2022)
- Website: www.archive81.com

Archive 81 is a horror podcast created by Daniel Powell and Marc Sollinger. Presented as found footage, it follows Dan (voiced by Powell), an archivist tasked with restoring the audio recordings of a young woman named Melody Pendras (Amelia Kidd) during her stay in an old apartment building.

The series premiered April 16, 2016, with its third and final season concluding on October 5, 2018. Each of the three seasons consisted of ten episodes. The series also includes two miniseries, the two-episode The Golden Age released in 2017 between seasons 2 and 3, and the three-episode Left of the Dial released in 2019 after the conclusion of the main show. A television adaptation of the same name premiered on Netflix in January 2022.

== Synopsis ==
The first two seasons center on an audio archivist named Dan, who has recently been hired for a job that involves reviewing and cataloguing a set of old audio tapes. The contract is for a group called the Housing Historical Committee of New York State and involves working at a remote and isolated bunker in the middle of the woods. Throughout his time on the job, Dan is contacted by his boss, who insists that Dan must continuously record himself for archival and legal purposes. The audio tapes that Dan is listening to are over two decades old and contain interviews conducted by a social worker named Melody Pendras.

In the 1990s, Melody Pendras was doing interviews with residents of an old and mysterious Manhattan apartment building called the Visser building. The interviews are with strange and eccentric residents of the building and often include references to a terrible and unnerving song that has affected the people living in the building. Pendras grows increasingly concerned about the effect the Visser building is having on its residents and attempts to intervene, rather than acting simply as an observer. Pendras has a female partner named Alexa who is briefly introduced, but otherwise the tapes consist only of her interviews with other residents.

Throughout the first season, Dan attempts to make sense of the tapes and becomes increasingly rattled by the unsettling interviews carried out by Pendras. He becomes obsessed with his work, neglecting his relationships both with his girlfriend and his best friend, Mark.

At the end of the first season, Mark reveals that the podcast up to that point consisted of tapes he received in the mail from Dan shortly before Dan went missing in January 2016. Mark is trying to figure out what happened to Dan by slowly releasing the audio to the public as a series of podcast episodes.

The second season follows Dan as he explores a different world. After the events of the first season, he was captured by a corporation known as LMG, which was really funding his archival project in season one. His body has been modified without his consent, making him part tape recorder. He is tasked with using an archive of tapes to assist two explorers, Clara and Lou, as they search a strange other world called the City for economic opportunities for LMG to exploit. Dan is joined by an unnerving man who he names Rat and a woman named Suit who LMG executives possess in order to access the City.

Between seasons two and three is a miniseries called "The Golden Age". It shows the production of a radio play called "Wingbeats" that famous director Oscar Waters is trying to put on.

The third season introduces new protagonists, half-siblings Nicholas Waters and Christine Anderson who met recently at their father's funeral. They discover that their father was involved in a magic underworld and decide to investigate using the tapes of instructions he left Nicholas in his will. They recruit an eldritch being called Static Man as their ally.

The final installment of the show is three-part miniseries called Left of the Dial, which began with an episode entitled "The Passenger". The miniseries follows Nicholas and Static Man as they go on a road trip to a section of the City called "the Blacktop".

== Background and production ==
Daniel Powell began recording radio shows at a young age using the family computer and Windows 95. Powell graduated from Darlington School and began his career in sound engineering. Powell was working from home in isolation, reviewing and archiving sound effects from an audio library for a company called Sound snap, when he and his friend Marc Sollinger came up with the idea for Archive 81. Sollinger worked as an associate producer on a radio program called Innovation Hub, which had support and funding from WGBH and Public Radio Exchange. Archive 81 did not have the same support and funding as Innovation Hub because it was produced independently, which meant that the first season was written, performed, recorded, and edited by themselves in a friend's bedroom.

The second season was released in January 2017. A month later, a mini-series titled The Golden Age was released, which uses the old school radio drama style production.

== Characters ==
=== Main ===
- Dan (Daniel Powell) is an archivist employed by the "Housing Historical Committee of New York State" in 2015 and the protagonist of seasons 1 and 2. His task to digitize the tapes in Archive 81 leads him to become deeply invested in Melody and her findings at the Visser. In season 2, his body is forcefully modified to record and play tapes, replacing a third of his human body with machines. He briefly appears in the final episode of season 3.
- Mark (Marc Sollinger) is Dan's friend who releases the first season's tapes in order to solve the disappearance of Dan. He returns as the Leviathan Dromen in seasons 2 and 3. In The Golden Age, he appears as the Foley artist for the radio production of Wingbeats, where it is also revealed how he became Dromen.
- Melody Pendras (Amelia Kidd) is a social worker surveying the Visser in 1994, under the supervision of the "Urban Preservation and Development Department of New York State". She mostly appears in the tapes archived by Dan, in which she interviews the residents living in the Visser and investigates meetings held by the Visser Historical Society. In season 2, it is revealed that she has taken residence in The City with her wife, Alexa.
- Oscar Waters (Peter Musante) is the director and lead actor of Wingbeats, starring as the King in the radio play. In The Golden Age, he recounts how he bought the script for Wingbeats from a mysterious shop in Paris, not knowing that the play is a ritual used to summon a Leviathan. He is the grandfather of Nicholas and Christine.
- Alice (Kristen DiMercurio) is a cast member of Wingbeats and plays the role of the Dancer.
- Patricia (Leigh Poulos) is a cast member of Wingbeats and plays the role of the Queen. She also appears in the 28th episode as Ms. Roland, a seller of "arcane artifacts" who transports Christine into another world to obtain some dream ambergris.
- Nicholas Waters (Peter Musante) is the protagonist of season 3 and Christine's half-brother. Throughout the season, he attempts to perform a ritual passed onto him by his deceased father. He is the grandson of Oscar Waters.
- Christine Anderson (Kristen DiMercurio) is the protagonist of season 3 and Nicholas' half-sister. Along with Nicholas, she performs the ritual given by their deceased father. In the 28th episode, she goes into a dream state where she becomes a crew member of The Irons. Since time moves differently in the dream state, she stays there for three years, but returns to the human world only moments after being put to sleep.

=== Recurring ===
- Mr. Davenport (David Powell) is a middle manager in LMG and Dan's employer.
- Samuel (Austin Mitchell)
- Jacob Lester (John Maher)
- Alexa (Carly Piersol)
- Suit (Lori-Felipe Barkin)
- Clara (Francesca Calo)
- Lou (Alister Austin)
- Payphone (Jamie Agnello)
- Static Man (Jack Calk)
- Aleister (Neil Tyrone)

== List of episodes ==
Season	Episodes	Originally released	
Season	Episodes	First released	Last released
1	10	April 5, 2016	August 9, 2016
2	10	January 18, 2017	May 24, 2017
The Golden Age	2	June 7, 2017	June 21, 2017
3	10	May 16, 2018	October 5, 2018
Left of the Dial	3	May 1, 2019	June 5, 2019

=== Season 1 (2016) ===
The first season chronicles Dan's time in the bunker, which was recorded for legal purposes and due to the insistence of Mr. Davenport, the man who hired him to catalog and restore audio tapes from archive 81 of the Housing Historical Committee of New York State's tape library. Each episode ends with a note from Mark, Dan's friend, who has released the tapes to the public in an effort to find Dan, who has mysteriously disappeared.

No. overall	No. in season	Title	Running time	Original release date
1	1	"A Body In A New Place"	16:46	April 5, 2016
2	2	"A Night At An Opera"	14:47	April 19, 2016
3	3	"A Story In Cycles"	16:52	May 3, 2016
4	4	"A Collection of Disparate Strangeness"	17:58	May 17, 2016
5	5	"A Spider in a Web"	16:28	May 31, 2016
6	6	"A Conversation Without Record"	14:17	June 14, 2016
7	7	"A Face in a Crowd"	15:44	June 28, 2016
8	8	"A Chemical Experiment"	18:35	July 12, 2016
9	9	"An Implosion of an Idea"	15:34	July 26, 2016
10	10	"The Ending, Perhaps"	15:07	August 9, 2016

=== Season 2 (2017) ===
The second season focuses on Dan as he is transported to another world called The City. Each episode begins and ends with a note from a creature named Dromen.

No. overall	No. in season	Title	Running time	Original release date
11	1	"Body, Recorder"	38:38	January 18, 2017
12	2	"Fly, Honeypot"	41:51	February 1, 2017
13	3	"Song, Doorway"	33:39	February 15, 2017
14	4	"Water, Leviathans"	36:46	March 1, 2017
15	5	"Aurora, Cello"	43:15	March 15, 2017
16	6	"Vines, Contest"	43:31	April 2, 2017
17	7	"Reflection, Retaliation"	30:10	April 12, 2017
18	8	"Collection, Composition"	34:09	April 26, 2017
19	9	"Escape, Birth"	29:22	May 10, 2017
20	10	"Portal, Ending"	35:55	May 24, 2017

=== The Golden Age (2017) ===
No. overall	No. in season	Title	Running time	Original release date
21	1	"The Golden Age, Part 1"	27:44	June 7, 2017
22	2	"The Golden Age, Part 2"	31:52	June 21, 2017

=== Season 3 (2018) ===
No. overall	No. in season	Title	Running time	Original release date
23	1	"Anoint his forehead with rabbit's blood"	38:38	May 16, 2018
24	2	"Sleep on a pillow of swanfeathers"	29:35	May 30, 2018
25	3	"Sacrifice three bunnies on the stump of an oak tree to stop moderate to severe throat irritation"	29:51	June 13, 2018
26	4	"And a knife both of you have used to cut meat"	37:13	June 27, 2018
27	5	"Mix the crushed lead with three drops of your own blood"	36:16	July 11, 2018
28	6	"Exist in the place you are currently occupying"	1:02:19	August 8, 2018
29	7	"A secret that will make the other think less of you"	41:01	August 22, 2018
30	8	"Lay a tarp upon the ground"	38:53	September 5, 2018
31	9	"Whatever is in the pond...kill it"	36:07	September 19, 2018
32	10	"Are we going to have a problem here?"	36:17	October 5, 2018

=== Left of the Dial (2019) ===
No. overall	No. in season	Title	Running time	Original release date
33	1	"The Passenger"	43:24	May 1, 2019
34	2	"Trucker's Atlas"	1:01:14	May 15, 2019
35	3	"When The Open Road Is Closing In"	1:10:37	June 5, 2019

== Influences ==
Powell and Sollinger view Orson Welles' radio drama The War of the Worlds as an inspiration and influence for their work on Archive 81. The show has influences from the soft horror and paranormal horror popularized by 90s television series such as Twin Peaks and The X Files. The show also has similarities to a Roberto Bolaño novel and contains references to David Cronenberg's film Videodrome. The show also has similarities to the urban horror themes present in series such as Candyman.

The show has been described as a radio drama, found-footage podcast, and a fictional scripted investigative journalism podcast. The show uses themes of conspiracy theories. The show is a mix of horror, fantasy, and sci-fi.

While not playing in the worlds of H.P. Lovecraft, there are clear connections to some of Lovecraft's works, such as "The Call of Cthulhu" and "At the Mountains of Madness." For example, there are references to "non-Euclidean geometry" and to a woman with gills, a Deep One in Lovecraft's world.

== Reception ==
The show was recommended by Cassandra Baim at The Guardian, saying that "the show will suck you in from the very first episode and leave you with new questions and theories after each listen."

The first season was ten episodes long and reached #25 on the iTunes Chart.

== TV adaptation ==
The podcast was adapted into a television series for Netflix by Rebecca Sonnenshine, with James Wan executive producing through his Atomic Monster banner. The show debuted on January 14, 2022, and stars Mamoudou Athie, Dina Shihabi, and Matt McGorry. The television series was loosely based on the same story. In the podcast Dan is only archiving audiotapes, but in the television series he is restoring videotapes. In March 2022, the series was canceled after one season.
