= Bob Murphy (jazz musician) =

Canadian jazz pianist and music educator

- Born: May 28, 1945
- Died: October 22, 2015 (aged 70) Vancouver, British Columbia, Canada
- Genres: Jazz
- Occupations: Pianist, music educator
- Instrument: Piano

Bob Murphy (May 28, 1945 – October 22, 2015) was a Canadian jazz pianist and music educator, prominent on the Vancouver, British Columbia, and Toronto, Ontario, music scenes. A professional musician since age 14, Murphy composed, arranged, and performed music for films, CBC Television shows, CTV shows, commercials, and CBC radio. In addition to regular live performances, Murphy was an esteemed music instructor specializing in jazz piano, improvisation, and musician performance skills.

Murphy's musical influences include Bill Evans, Keith Jarrett, Miles Davis, Cannonball Adderley, Chick Corea and John Coltrane.

He died on October 22, 2015, in Vancouver.

== Discography ==
- Come Rain Or Come Shine (Hammond B-3 Organ)
- B3 (Hammond B-3 Organ)
- I Have A Dream (piano)
- The Art Of The Jazz Ballad (piano) Joani Taylor (vocals)
- Lullaby of the Leaves (piano) Melody Diachun (vocals)
- Mysteries And Tall Tales (piano)
- Wall Street Sessions (piano) Joani Taylor (vocals)
- Free On The Inside (piano)
- Downtown Eastside Picnic (jazz quartet)
- In My Own Voice (piano) Joani Taylor (vocals)

== See also ==
- List of jazz pianists
- Music of Canada
