= Amelie Fried =

German writer and television presenter (born 1958)

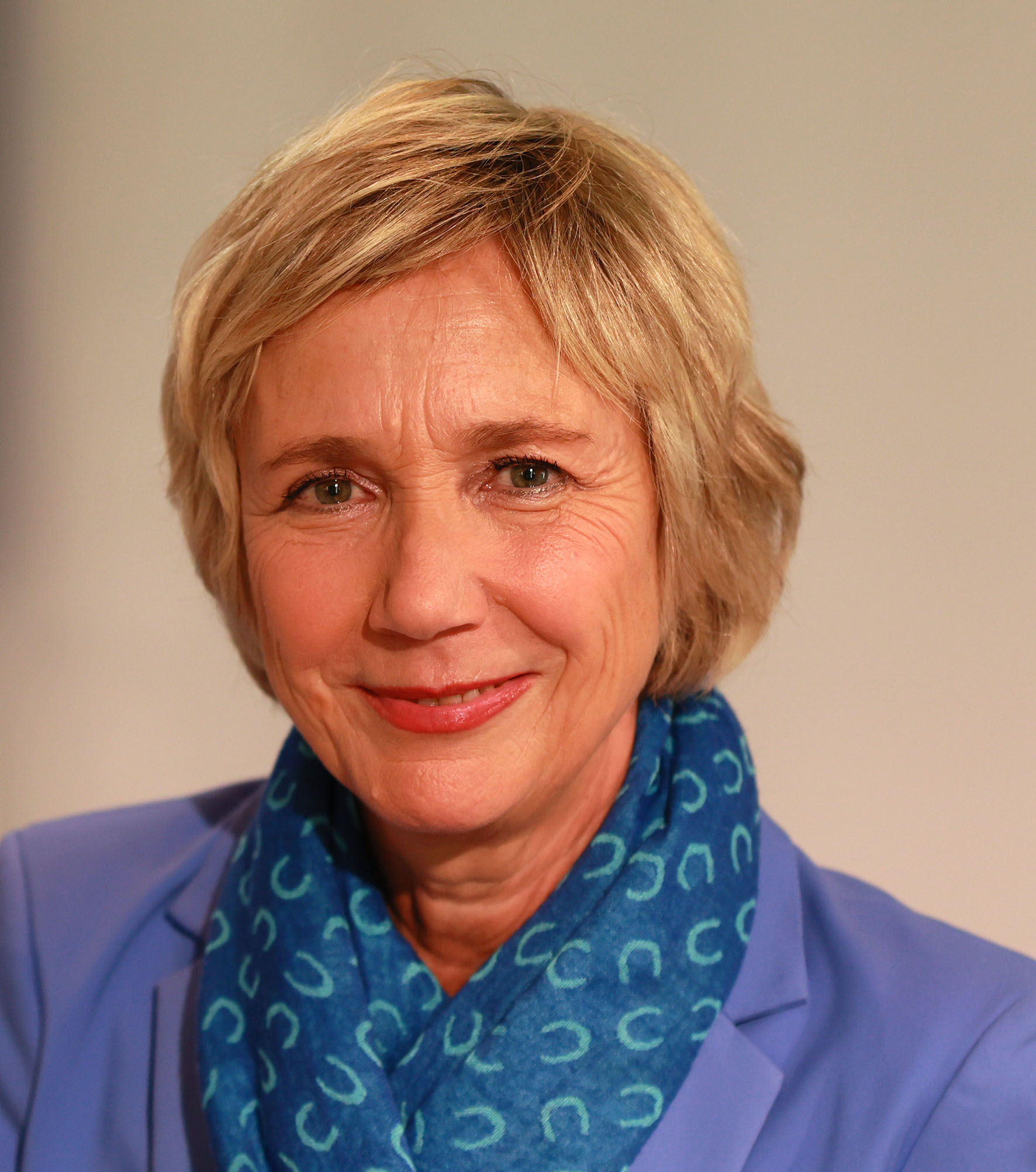
- Fried in 2022
- Born: Amelie Ilse Fried; 6 September 1958 (age 67); Ulm, Germany
- Occupations: Writer; television presenter
- Spouse: Peter Probst
- Relatives: Nicolaus Florian Fried; Rainer Fried
- Writing career
- Language: German
- Website: ameliefried.de

Amelie Fried (6 September 1958) is a German writer and television presenter. Her father, Kurt Fried, is the creator-publisher of Schwäbische Donauzeitung, part of Südwest Presse. She studied journalism and film at the University of Television and Film Munich. She has worked extensively in television and has published numerous books. Her 2008 book Schuhhaus Pallas. Wie meine Familie sich gegen die Nazis wehrte deals with her family's persecution in Nazi Germany.

== Biography ==
After graduating from the Odenwald School in Heppenheim, Fried studied theater, journalism, art history, German studies, communication studies, ethnology, and Italian at LMU Munich from 1976 to 1983, without obtaining a degree. She then studied documentary film and television journalism until 1989 at the University of Television and Film Munich.

In 1984, Fried began to host television programs, including the 1984–1997 youth radio program Live aus dem Alabama (Live from the Alabama), which dealt with topics such as AIDS, right-wing radicalism, drugs, and occultism. She also hosted the show 3 nach 9 between 1999 and 2009.

Fried has worked extensively as a writer. Until 2011, she wrote a regular column for the women's magazine Für Sie, and in 1995, she published her first children's book, Die StörenFrieds. Geschichten von Leo und Paulina (The Troublemakers. Stories from Leo and Paulina).

Fried is married to screenwriter Peter Probst, who has contributed to some of her publications.

== Selected works ==
=== Adult literature ===
- Traumfrau mit Nebenwirkungen Hoffmann und Campe, Hamburg 1996; Goldmann, Munich 1998, ISBN 3-442-43865-9
- Am Anfang war der Seitensprung Novel. Hoffmann und Campe, Hamburg 1998; Heyne Verlag, Munich 2006, ISBN 3-453-40497-1
- Wann bitte findet das Leben statt? (editor) Rowohlt Verlag, Reinbek 1999; ibid. 2006, ISBN 3-499-24261-3
- Der Mann von nebenan Novel. Heyne, Munich 1999; ibid. 2006, ISBN 3-453-40496-3
- Geheime Leidenschaften und andere Geständnisse Heyne, Munich 2001, ISBN 3-453-18665-6
- Glücksspieler Novel. Heyne, Munich 2001; ibid. 2008, ISBN 978-3-453-40647-6
- Verborgene Laster und andere Geständnisse Heyne, Munich 2003, ISBN 3-453-87129-4
- Liebes Leid und Lust Novel. Heyne, Munich 2003; ibid. 2006, ISBN 3-453-40495-5
- Rosannas Tochter Novel. Heyne, Munich 2005; ibid. 2008, ISBN 978-3-453-72174-6
- Offene Geheimnisse und andere Enthüllungen Heyne, Munich 2006, ISBN 3-453-59015-5
- Die Findelfrau Novel. Heyne, Munich 2007; ibid. 2008, ISBN 978-3-453-40550-9
- Schuhhaus Pallas. Wie meine Familie sich gegen die Nazis wehrte with participation from Peter Probst. Carl Hanser Verlag, Munich 2008; expanded: dtv, Munich 2010, ISBN 978-3-423-62464-0
- Franz Josef und ich oder Liebe auf den zweiten Blick Sanssouci Verlag, Munich 2008, ISBN 978-3-8363-0089-6
- Immer ist gerade jetzt Novel. Heyne, Munich 2009; ibid. 2010, ISBN 978-3-453-40719-0
- Eine windige Affäre Novel. Heyne, Munich 2011, ISBN 978-3-453-26588-2
- Wildes Leben. Späte Einsichten und verblüffende Aussichten Heyne, München 2011, ISBN 978-3-453-40674-2
- Verliebt, verlobt – verrückt. Warum alles gegen die Ehe spricht und noch mehr dafür Heyne, Munich 2012, ISBN 978-3-453-19524-0
- Traumfrau mit Lackschäden Novel. Heyne, Munich 2014, ISBN 978-3-453-26589-9
- Ich fühle was, was du nicht fühlst Novel. Heyne, Munich 2016, ISBN 978-3-453-26590-5

=== Books for children and young adults ===
- Die StörenFrieds. Geschichten von Leo und Paulina. Illustrated by Jacky Gleich. Mosaik, Munich 1995; Goldmann, Munich 1999, ISBN 3-442-44380-6
- Neues von den Störenfrieds Illustrated by Jacky Gleich. Mosaik, Munich 1997; Goldmann, Munich 1999, ISBN 3-442-44564-7
- Hat Opa einen Anzug an? Illustrated by Jacky Gleich. Hanser, Munich 1997, ISBN 3-446-19076-7
- Der unsichtbare Vater Illustrated by Jacky Gleich. Hanser, Munich 1999, ISBN 3-446-19737-0
- Taco und Kaninchen (with Peter Probst). 6 Volumes, Munich 2003–2006
- Ich liebe dich wie Apfelmus. Die schönsten Gedichte für Kleine und Große (editor) Bertelsmann, Munich 2006, ISBN 3-570-13141-6
- Unsere Lieblingsgeschichten (editor) Omnibus, Munich 2007, ISBN 978-3-570-21806-8

=== Newspaper articles ===
- Über die Odenwaldschule. Die rettende Hölle. in: FAZ, 14 June 2010.

=== Film adaptations ===
- Traumfrau mit Nebenwirkungen (1998)
- Am Anfang war der Seitensprung (1999)
- Am Anfang war die Eifersucht (2001)
- Der Mann von nebenan (2001)
- Liebes Leid und Lust (2006)
- Rosannas Tochter (2010)

== Awards and recognition ==
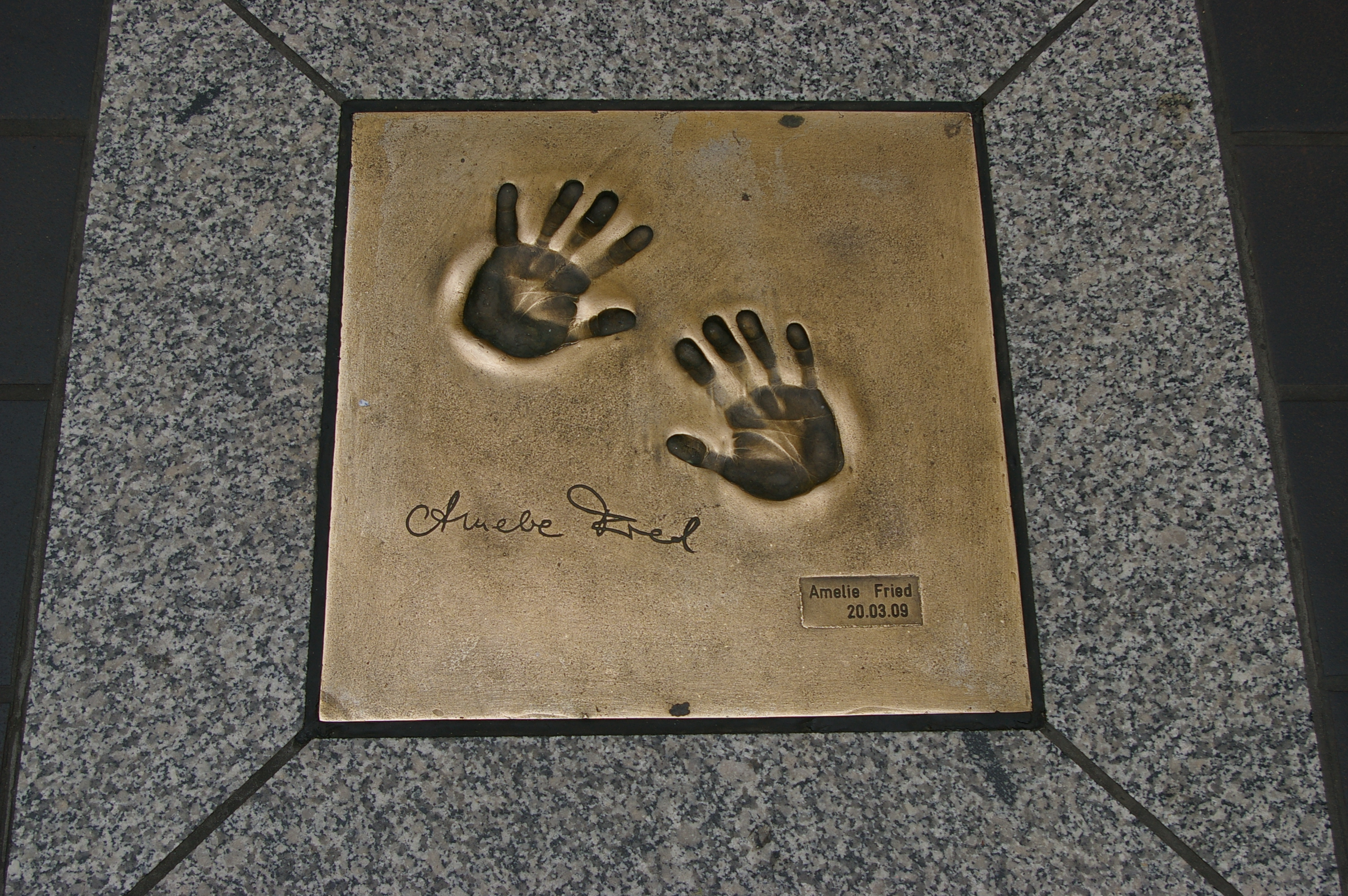
Amelie Fried's handprints on the Mall of Fame, Bremen

- Grimme-Preis (1986)
- Telestar (1986)
- Bambi Award – for television hosting (1988)
- Deutscher Jugendliteraturpreis for Hat Opa einen Anzug an? (1998)
- Handprint on the Mall of Fame in Bremen (2009)
- Upper Bavarian Culture Award (2019)
