= Jack Wolfskin =

German outdoors clothing and equipment manufacturer and retail chain

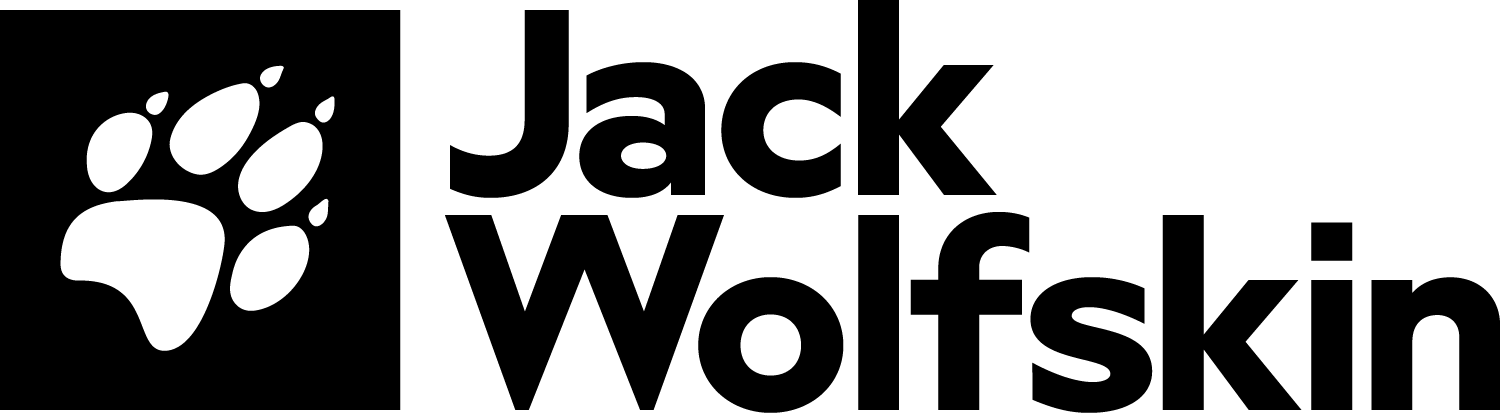
- Type: GmbH & Co. KGaA
- Industry: Outdoor clothing; Camping equipment
- Genre: Outdoor clothing
- Founded: 1981; 45 years ago
- Founder: Ulrich Dausien
- Headquarters: Idstein, Germany
- Number of locations: Worldwide
- Key people: Richard Collier, CEO
- Revenue: ▼€ 351 million (2012)
- Number of employees: ca. 700 (end-2012)
- Parent: Anta Sports
- Website: jack-wolfskin.com

Jack Wolfskin is a producer of outdoor wear and equipment headquartered in Idstein, Germany.

Founded in 1981, the German firm has now supplies outdoor products including sports equipment, mountain and leisure clothing, footwear, rucksacks, sleeping bags, and tents.

== History ==
Jack Wolfskin was founded as a trademark of the company Sine in Frankfurt am Main, Germany by Ulrich Dausien in 1981. With proceeding success, Jack Wolfskin was incorporated separately from Sine.

Sold in 1991 to Johnson Outdoors, the company had supplied only specialist shops until their first own shop was opened in Heidelberg in 1993. As of mid-2012, there were more than 500, mostly franchised, Jack Wolfskin stores worldwide.

In 2005, three years after purchasing it for €42 million, Bain Capital sold Jack Wolfskin to Quadriga Capital and Barclays Private Equity for €93 million. In 2011, when it acquired the firm, Blackstone Group is expected to help Jack Wolfskin to grow further on an international level.

Simultaneously with the sale of Jack Wolfskin to Blackstone, the former CEO and co-owner Manfred Hell left the company with immediate effect, after 25 years at the top of the company. In November 2014, Melody Harris-Jensbach was selected as CEO of the company.

On 6 July 2017, Jack Wolfskin announced that it had successfully completed a financial restructuring with its main creditors and reduced its debt by €225 million ($256 million); the move brought down its debt from €365 million to €110 million, with terms extended until 2022. Additionally, the clothing firm received a new temporary loan of €25 million ($28 million) from current senior creditors, who would become new shareholders of the company as a result of the restructuring process.

Jack Wolfskin's new owners will hold their stake via a Luxemburg-based holding company; these include Bain Capital Credit, HIG / Bayside Capital and CQS, who now own more than 50% of the brand. Reports announced in April that private equity firm Blackstone had handed over control of the German company to a group of its lenders in a debt-for-equity swap.

In January 2019, two months after the company announced that it would be acquired by Callaway Golf Company (currently known as Topgolf Callaway Brands), it was reported that the transaction valued at €418 million had been completed. On 23 November 2020, Jack Wolfskin announced that Richard Collier would be the new CEO of Jack Wolfskin, effective from 1 December 2020.

In 2022, researchers from Nordhausen University of Applied Sciences identified cotton from Xinjiang in Jack Wolfskin shirts.

In April 2025, it was announced that Jinjiang-based company Anta Sports would acquire Jack Wolfskin for €262 million ($290 million). On June 2, this transaction was completed.

== Corporate responsibility ==
Since July 2010, Jack Wolfskin has been a member of the Fair Wear Foundation (FWF), a multi-stakeholder initiative working to improve workplace conditions in the garment and textile industry. In July 2007, Jack Wolfskin became patron of the I.C.E. Youth Camp a UNEP-initiative which has the aim to train young persons an environmentally awareness and a thrifty use of resources in cooperation with Arved Fuchs.

In 2008, supplier monitoring was established at Jack Wolfskin, and in 2009, the company announced that membership in a multi-stakeholder initiative will be checked. When the Clean Clothes Campaign distributed questionnaires about working and production conditions to several outdoor producers in 2009 and 2010, Jack Wolfskin decided to become a member of the FWF as there were many similarities to their own established social audit system. Together with Wolfgang Niedecken and World Vision Germany the project "Rebound" was initiated in 2008. The aim of the project is to improve the living conditions of former child soldiers in Uganda and to reintegrate them into society. In 2010, the Swiss NGO Erklärung von Bern compared working condition standards in countries of production of 77 fashion brands. Jack Wolfskin was graded into the "average" category, the second best of five categories.

== Litigation ==
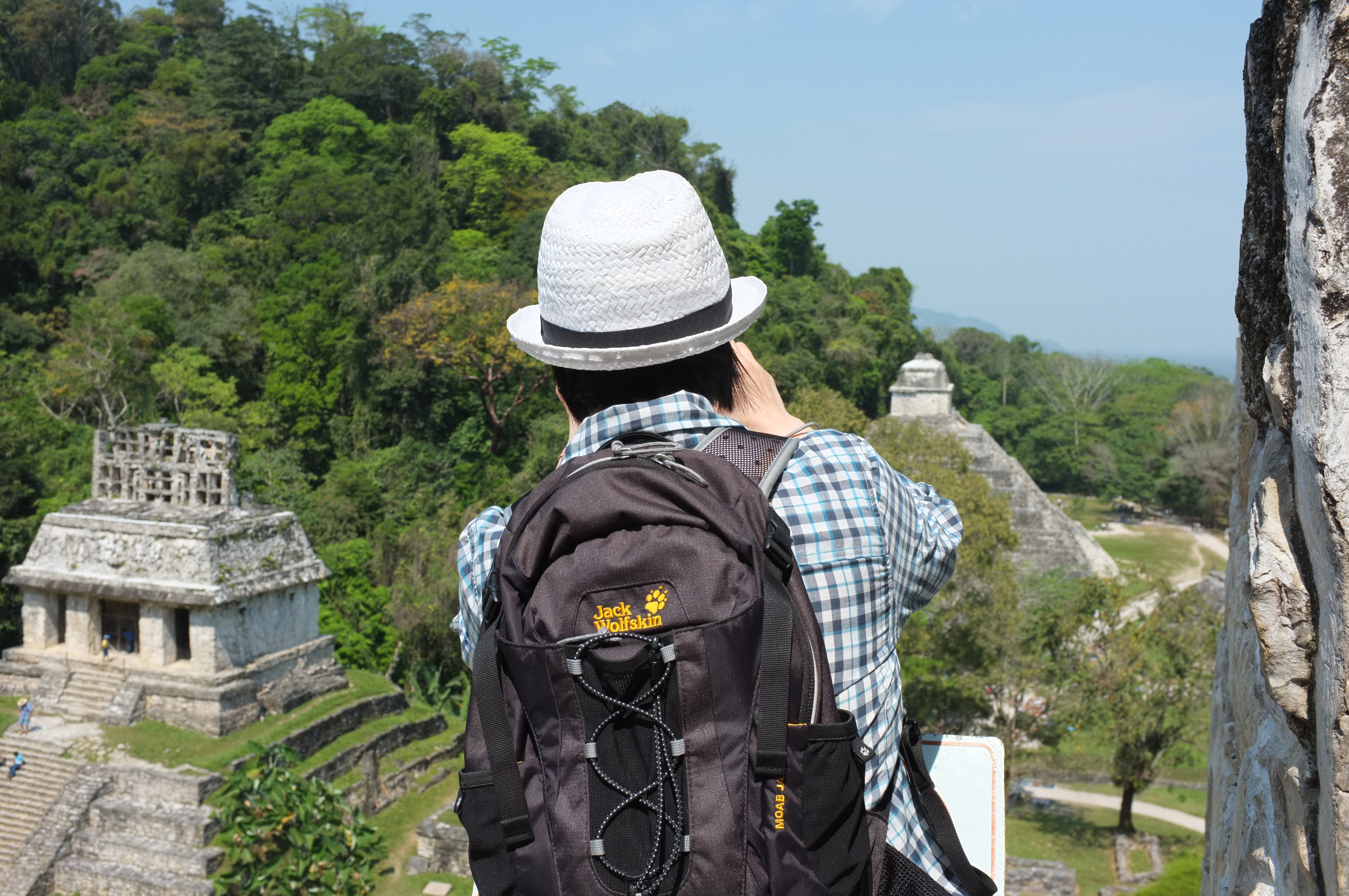
A Jack Wolfskin rucksack being worn by a tourist.

Jack Wolfskin has a history of aggressive legal action related to its paw print logo. In 2002, it succeeded in prohibiting the taz newspaper from using a paw print design on merchandise designed for outdoor use on the grounds that the taz logo designed in 1978 was not registered as a trademark, whereas the Jack Wolfskin logo was registered in 1982. This led to many people boycotting its products.

In October 2009, Jack Wolfskin's lawyers sent demands for damage payments to handicraft hobbyists who had used paw designs in their creations, irrespective of whether the paw design was of a wolf, cat or other animal. This prompted a backlash in online forums for handicrafts and bloggers documenting corporate behaviour, outraged at the bullying tactics used by a large firm against individual hobbyists with barely measurable income through clothing and no intention to mimic Jack Wolfskin goods. The protest reached national news media in Germany. A blunt refusal to back down by Jack Wolfskin led to calls to boycott their products in several online communities in Germany and abroad. As the impact of the negative publicity became apparent, Jack Wolfskin later issued a press release to indicate they would in future open dialog directly with people it suspected of breaching its copyright, rather than sending damage payment demands as the first contact.

In November 2009, Jack Wolfskin threatened the Dutch company Bearwear, a clothing supplier to the gay bear scene, with legal action causing it to suspend its European web shop and generating ill-feelings to Jack Wolfskin with its customers. This was eventually resolved, allowing Bearwear to continue trading with its logo that incorporates a bear paw print.

On 19 December 2011, the Civic Association Dog Soul from Slovakia (a non-profit organization) received an e-mail with a copy of a letter from an attorney and patent office representing the Jack Wolfskin Ausrüstung für Draussen GmbH & Co. KGaA company. Simultaneously - without any valid court decision - they directly accused them of violating trademark property rights.

== Sponsorship ==
In August 2010, Jack Wolfskin signed a 3-year deal to sponsor the English football club Liverpool FC, in a chance to increase its exposure in the UK. In April 2013, Liverpool FC and Jack Wolfskin announced a 3-year extension of their partnership deal.

Jack Wolfskin have previously been sponsors of the FIS Alpine Ski World Cup.
