= Heyne Verlag =

German publishing house

- Parent company: Penguin Random House
- Founded: 15 February 1934; 92 years ago
- Country of origin: Germany
- Headquarters location: Munich
- Key people: Ulrich Genzler
- Fiction genres: Suspense, entertainment for women, historical programs, youth literature, fantasy and science fiction, hardcover, nonfiction and guidebooks
- Official website: www.heyne.de

Heyne Verlag (formerly Wilhelm Heyne Verlag) is a German publisher based in Munich, which was founded in Dresden in 1934 and sold to Axel Springer in 2000. In 2004 it became part of Random House. Heyne was one of the largest publishing houses in Germany in 1999.

== History ==
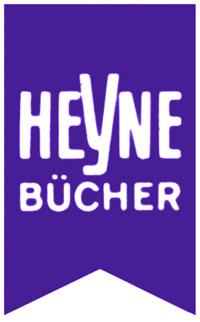
Logo until 2003

=== Wilhelm Heyne era: 1934–1960 ===
Wilhelm Heyne founded the publisher, named after him, on 15 February 1934 in Dresden. The first authors included Reinhold Conrad Muschler (Die Unbekannte), Werner Bergengruen (Die drei Falken), Ernst Moritz Mungenast (Christop Gadar), and Arthur-Heinz Lehmann (Rauhbautz will auch leben!), as well as the US writer Gwen Bristow with Deep Summer (Tiefer Süden). In 1940, Franz Schneekluth acquired minority shares in Heyne after he became director of the publishing house in 1935. During the air raids on Dresden the publishing house in Reichsstraße was completely destroyed.

After the war, the activities in Munich were resumed in 1948, with Wilhelm Heyne holding only 40 percent of the shares in the publishing house.

=== Rolf Heyne era: 1960–2000 ===
In 1951, Rolf Heyne joined the Wilhelm Heyne Verlag, where he took over the management at the beginning of the 1960s. Under his leadership, the publisher's paperback program was created. It was expanded in 1966 by the works of Georges Simenon, which was given to the Wilhelm Heyne Verlag by Kiepenheuer & Witsch. In addition, the paperbacks of the Kindler Verlag were taken over. The 1950s and 1960s were also characterized by the introduction of various series in addition to the regular program (General Series). These included Heyne Paperbacks for world literary works as well as Heyne Science Fiction and Heyne Trade books. The latter started with Profiles in Courage by John F. Kennedy, for which the author received the Pulitzer Prize. In 1970, the Moewig Verlag, which the Heyne family had bought before the Second World War, was sold to Bauer Media Group.

In 1974, Wilhelm Heyne Verlag co-operated with the publishing group Bertelsmann, with the intention of better covering the market for paperbacks. At the same time, Heyne should be facilitated access to youth, trade and specialist titles. They also worked with Hestia Verlag from Bayreuth. At the end of the 1970s, a number of licenses from the publisher Fritz Molden was also purchased to expand Heyne's program.

At that time, the Heyne paperbacks had a total circulation of over 100 million copies. The Karl May series began with Winnetou I in 1976, and other specialized programs such as Heyne Geschichte and Heyne Lyrik.

In 1982 the Wilhelm Heyne Verlag was finally transformed into a GmbH & Co. KG (a kind of limited liability partnership) under the direction of Hans-Joachim Brede and Friedhelm Koch. Rolf Heyne was a limited partner with a contribution of eight million Deutsche Mark. In the early 1990s, the publisher bought the majority of Zabert Sandmann and worked together with publishers Haffmans and Beltz-Quadriga in the areas of various imprints. By the end of 1993, Heyne had published a total of 16,000 titles in an edition of 500 million copies.

=== Axel Springer and Random House ===
At the end of the 1990s, the media reported about interests from several major publishers wanting to take over Heyne, including Bertelsmann and the publishing group Holtzbrinck. According to media reports, Bertelsmann was given the best chances, but Axel Springer stepped up in December 2000. Rolf Heyne was to join the supervisory board of the new publishing group Heyne Ullstein, but died shortly after the acquisition.

In February 2003 the publishing group Random House wanted to take over the publishers Ullstein Heyne List from Axel Springer. The Federal Cartel Office, however, did not approve the acquisition, as a dominant market position of German-language paperbacks was feared. The acquisition was limited to the Wilhelm Heyne Verlag, while the remaining publishers including the Heyne programs for esoterism and fantasy were distributed to the Swedish Bonnier Group. The guidebooks and audiobook publishers were part of the transaction, which the Federal Cartel Office finally agreed to in November of that year. Heyne was merged with Random House during the takeover. Since then, the Heyne Verlag has been a part of the Random House publishing group, but is treated as a separate publisher in bookstores.

== Program ==
Previously, the Heyne Verlag organized its program in so-called series, of which a total of more than 50 existed. The subject of a series were either certain subjects (e.g., Heyne Film Library) or events (e.g., the Heyne Jubilee Series since 1993). In 2014, all available works were divided into the following categories: Suspense, Entertainment for Women, Historical Programs, Young Program, Fantasy & Science Fiction, Hardcover, Nonfiction and Guidebooks. Heyne published both hardcover and paperbacks, including Authors such as Nicholas Sparks, Robert Harris, Amelie Fried, Sabine Thiesler, John Grisham and Stephen King.

In the mid-1980s, the publisher launched the Rolf Heyne Collection for the first time to expand the hardcover program. The aim of the imprint was, according to various statements of the publication of high-quality illustrated volumes, to meet the "aesthetic requirements" of the publisher. A central theme of the series was, for example, French cuisine, but also baby photos by Anne Geddes. With the takeover of the Wilhelm Heyne Verlag by Axel Springer in the year 2000, the program of the Rolf Heyne CollectionGmbH was continued as an independent publisher. At the end of 2014, Rolf Heyne's widow Anja closed business of the Rolf Heyne Collection.

== Controversies ==
Heyne placed Maggi soup adverts in the body of various fictional works without the authors' knowledge, giving the company additional revenue which would not have to be passed on to the creators. This included the German edition of Pyramids by Terry Pratchett. Pratchett switched publishers upon learning of this practice.
