= Y'a pas que les grands qui rêvent =

Single by Melody

from the album Danse ta vie
- Language: French
- B-side: "Instrumental"
- Released: August 1989
- Genre: Pop
- Length: 3:40
- Label: Orlando / Carrère 14713
- Composer: Jean-Pierre Millers
- Lyricists: Guy Carlier, Jean-Pierre Millers
- Producers: Orlando, Jean-Pierre Millers

Melody singles chronology
"Y'a pas que les grands qui rêvent" (1989)	"Chariot d'étoiles" (1990)

Music video
- "Y'a pas que les grands qui rêvent" (Télé Caroline, FR3) on YouTube

"Y'a pas que les grands qui rêvent" is the a 1989 song by Belgian singer Melody. Written by Guy Carlier and Jean-Pierre Millers, it was released as her debut single in August 1989, when she was 12-years-old. Later, it was included on Melody's debut album, Danse ta vie, released in 1991. It achieved success in France, peaking at number two for one month.

== Chart performance ==
In France, "Y'a pas que les grands qui rêvent" debuted at number 43 on the chart edition of 19 August 1989, climbed and reached the top ten in its sixth week, and eventually spent consecutive four weeks at number two in November, being blocked by Jive Bunny & The Mastermixers' "Swing the Mood" which topped the chart then. It remained for 19 weeks in the top ten and 28 weeks in the top 50. It achieved Gold status, awarded by the Syndicat National de l'Édition Phonographique. On the Eurochart Hot 100 Singles, it debuted at number 96 on 30 September 1989, reached a peak of number 12 in its 11th week, and fell off the chart after 21 weeks of presence, nine of them in the top 20.

== Cover versions ==
The song was covered and released in July 2021 by 12-year-old French singer Valentina.

== Track listings ==
- 7" single
1. "Y'a pas que les grands qui rêvent" — 3:40
2. "Y'a pas que les grands qui rêvent" (instrumental) — 3:40

== Charts ==
=== Weekly charts ===
Chart (1989–1990)	Peak position
Europe (European Hot 100)	12
France (SNEP)	2

=== Year-end charts ===
Chart (1989)	Peak position
Europe (Eurochart Hot 100)	83

Chart (1990)	Peak position
Europe (Eurochart Hot 100)	94

=== Certifications ===
Certifications for "Y'a pas que les grands qui rêvent"
Region	Certification	Certified units/sales
France (SNEP)	Gold	400,000^{*}
^{*} Sales figures based on certification alone.
