= Rebecca Sonnenshine =

American screenwriter

- Education: UCLA School of Theater, Film and Television
- Occupation: Screenwriter
- Writing career
- Years active: 2004-present
- Genres: Supernatural horror; Superhero; Fantasy; Historical fiction

Rebecca Sonnenshine is best known for her Emmy nominated work on the Amazon Prime show The Boys, being the screenwriter for the thriller, The Housemaid, and for being the developer and showrunner for the 2026 version of Little House on the Prairie.

Sonnenshine grew up in Oroville, California, and learned to read at a very young age. At UCLA she pursued being a filmmaker. After college she was awarded the Nicholl Fellowship. Shortly after being awarded the scholarship, she produced a film called Bunny in 2000, which garnered an Independent Spirit Award nomination. Several years later, she was hired to write for The Vampire Diaries, a job which she would continue doing for 5 years.

After working on the Vampire Diaries until 2015, she returned to filmmaking in 2017. Her return was marked by her script for the film The Keeping Hours, which was directed by fellow Nicholl Fellowship awardee Karen Moncrieff. After finishing The Keeping Hours she co-executive produced the TV show The Crossing. The Crossing would only last one season.

She then became an executive producer for Amazon Prime’s The Boys. While working for the show in its second season she secured two Emmy Nominations. She then worked with Netflix for the first time on a show entitled Archive 81. For the first time she would be both the creator and showrunner.

Her most recent film was The Housemaid for which she had the sole writing credit. In 2026, she worked with Netflix again, this time to update the 1970s television classic Little House on the Prairie.

== Early life ==
Sonnenshine grew up in Oroville, California. When she was five years old, one of the first book series she read was the Little House… book series by Laura Ingalls Wilder. She graduated from Soquel High School in 1989. She then graduated from UCLA School of Theater, Film and Television in 1993.

== Career ==
In 1999 Sonnenshine received a Nicholl Fellowship based on her script Mermaid Dreams. The Nicholl Fellowship is specifically intended to support young screenwriters. After receiving the fellowship she produced the film Bunny, which debuted in the year 2000. Sonnenshine did not write the script for the movie. The film was nominated for an Independent Spirit Award.

In 2004 she wrote her first film, Happily Even After. The movie is about the impact that parental death has on a pair of siblings. The film was not reviewed on Rotten Tomatoes. Only one reviewer in Singapore, from the blog Sinema, said the film was a conventional achievement in filmmaking. Sonnenshine worked on several other writing projects after making this film. She worked on the following television and film projects in between 2007 and 2009: American Zombie, The Haunting of Molly Hartley, Reversion, and Within.

Sonnenshine remarked, in an interview with Awards Radar that Julie Plec, creator of The Vampire Diaries took a chance on her even though Sonnenshine had no prior television experience. When she was hired as co-producer on the series, a supernatural soap opera about vampires and high school students, she finally felt like a working writer. Plec, in 2015, wrote that she liked the writing that Sonnenshine had done for the characters Klaus and Caroline in Season 3 of The Vampire Diaries. She made these comments while writing a commentary for Entertainment Weekly on an episode that Sonnenshine had written in Season 7 of The Vampire Diaries.

In 2017 Sonnenshine wrote a film which fellow Nicholl Fellowship winner Karen Moncreiff directed. The film was called The Keeping Hours. It is about how a couple deals with the loss of their child. The Keeping Hours won the LA Film Festival Narrative Feature Audience Award. Yet, even though it won a prize at the LA Film Festival not all critics were as enamored with the film as the audience members at the LA Film Festival. Sam Fragoso of The Wrap wrote that Sonnenshine “telegraphs the emotions of her characters”, and that she makes her main characters “quotidian”.

After completing The Keeping Hours Sonnenshine went on to co-executive produce produce a science fiction series for ABC called The Crossing. It was cancelled after one season. She was able to join another series just months after. She joined Cinemax's Outcast as a co-executive producer on the second season, and contributed to season 2, episode 4 entitled The One I'd Been Waiting For. The series was cancelled a month after the conclusion of its second season.

For the 2020 season of The Boys, a television program about a group of vigilantes, who want to take down superheroes, who have been corrupted by too much money and power, Sonnenshine received two Emmy nominations. One Emmy nomination was for Outstanding Writing in a Series for the episode entitled What I Know, the second-season finale. The other Emmy nomination was for Outstanding Drama Series. For both awards she lost to The Crown created by Peter Morgan. The episode received frustration and praise from different critics. Roxana Hadadi of The AV Club found the episode to be flawed in that it created false equivalencies between diametrically opposed political ideologies. Nick Nafpliotis of AIPT considered the episode to be highly successful calling it “thrilling, poignant, and haunting”.

After the success of her Emmy nominations for The Boys she developed a series with Netflix called Archive 81 which premiered in the beginning of 2022. At the beginning of the first season, Sonnenshine said that "Don’t Look Now, Hereditary, Rosemary’s Baby, Midsommar, and The X-Files" are all influences on Archive 81. The show is about an archivist who starts to repair video tapes and finds that they are about a dangerous cult that might harm the documentarian that is making the film. TV show has a 87% certified fresh critics score, and 75% audience score.

A decade after she had made The Keeping Hours, Sonnenshine made another contribution to cinema in 2025. Sonnenshine was the sole credited writer on the film The Housemaid, which is a thriller about a very wealthy couple and the new housemaid they have hired. On a budget of $35 million the film produced $400 million at the global box office. The critic rating stands at a certified fresh, 74% score, for the film at Rotten Tomatoes. From an audience perspective, 92% of The Housemaid audience members on Rotten Tomatoes gave it a positive rating. Individual critics from various Hollywood magazines gave their own nuanced opinions of the film. David Rooney of The Hollywood Reporter said that for a thriller this movie should have been more over the top, and was a bit too long, yet gave it a moderate recommendation. Pete Hammond of Deadline Hollywood on the other hand highlighted Sonnenshine's contribution by saying that the twists her writing added to the film made “The Housemaid” his guilty pleasure of the season.

In 2025, Netflix announced that Rebecca Sonnenshine would develop a new interpretation of the Little House on the Prairie series of books written by Laura Ingalls Wilder. Variety reported that this version would incorporate more indigenous, particularly Osage influence, on the stories telling. The Hollywood Reporter highlighted that family and community would be important themes for this adaptation of the books. The show stands certified fresh at Rotten Tomatoes at 80% and has a 69% positive rating from audience members. According to Deadline Hollywood, the show debuted with 6.4 million views, third among all Netflix shows. The second week the number of views increased by 50%, and the show had 9.8 million views making it the show with the highest views on Netflix by its second week.

== Personal life ==
Sonnenshine likes to bake, embroider, and knit in her spare time.

== Filmography ==
=== Film ===
- 2000: Bunny, producer
- 2004: Happily Even After, screenwriter
- 2007: American Zombie, co-writer
- 2008: The Haunting of Molly Hartley, co-writer
- 2008: Reversion, screenwriter and producer
- 2009: Within, screenwriter
- 2017: The Keeping Hours, screenwriter
- 2025: The Housemaid, screenwriter

=== Television ===
- 2011–2016: The Vampire Diaries; writer, co-producer (season 5), producer (season 6) and supervising producer (season 7)
- 2018: The Crossing; writer and co-executive producer
- 2018: Outcast; writer and co-executive producer (season 2)
- 2019–2020: The Boys writer; co-executive producer (season 1) and executive producer (season 2)
- 2022: Archive 81; developer, writer, showrunner and executive producer
- 2026–present: Little House on The Prairie; developer, writer, showrunner and executive producer
