= The Keeping Hours =

- Official poster
- Directed by: Karen Moncrieff
- Written by: Rebecca Sonnenshine
- Produced by: Jason Blum; John Miranda
- Starring: Lee Pace; Carrie Coon; Amy Smart; Ray Baker
- Cinematography: Anastas Michos
- Edited by: Timothy Alverson
- Music by: Adam Gorgoni
- Production company: Blumhouse Productions
- Distributed by: Universal Pictures
- Release dates: June 15, 2017 (LAFF); July 24, 2018
- Running time: 91 minutes
- Country: United States
- Language: English

The Keeping Hours is a 2017 American supernatural horror drama film directed by Karen Moncrieff and written by Rebecca Sonnenshine. The film stars Lee Pace, Carrie Coon and Sander Thomas. The film released on July 24, 2018, via video on demand and DVD on August 7, 2018, by Universal Pictures. Seven years after the death of their son, a divorced couple is suddenly reunited by supernatural events that offer them a chance at forgiveness.

== Plot ==
The movie opens with a couple preparing for a wedding at their home. Mark and Elizabeth already have a son, Jacob. After eight years they make the relationship official, exchange wedding vows, and enjoy a day long reception with family and friends. Time flashes to the future with the couple divorced after the son was killed in an automobile accident. The father was driving and the mother thinks she failed to secure the boy's seat belt. Each blame the other parent and yet themselves for the tragic death.

Mark is an attorney busy working at a large law firm. Elizabeth has remarried, written a book and lives in an expensive home with her step-daughters. Mark is bothered with tenants who abandoned the rented former marital home. Mark inspects the home where lights flicker and he hears strange noises. He hears footsteps and he finds Jacob's toys in the attic. He sees Jacob and passes out. After time and adjustment, Mark accepts Jacob's ghost as real. After Jacob asks Dad about Mommy, Mark brings Elizabeth to the home. She sees her son and thinks Mark has played some cruel trick on her. She learns to accept reality and is happy the boy is back in their lives. Neither parent can touch the boy.

Mark quits his job to make time to be with Jacob. Elizabeth visits the house each day. Jacob tells his parents he wants things back to normal including the couple back together loving one another. They all do things to make up for lost opportunities. Mom reads bedtime stories and Dad plays games. Jacob wants that real train set that he never got. The couple become close again. They learn that Jacob can leave the house so they go to the beach, build sand castles, and watch a beautiful sunset.

Jacob tells Mark that he pushed the red button that released the seat belt. Jacob caused his own death and Mark should not feel guilty and he should forgive Elizabeth. Elizabeth has been having nose bleeds and passes out after claiming to see her deceased mother. After an emergency room visit, Elizabeth tells Mark she stopped her depression medicine and the fainting was isolated and nothing to worry about. When Mark gets home, Jacob has his train set up and fully running. Jacob tells Mark that Elizabeth has to take a long train ride with him. Mark confronts Elizabeth and she tells him she has terminal cancer. Mark tells her that Jacob told him that he unlatched the seat belt and she was not at fault. Later, Jacob comes to his mother's hospital room; she hugs him, and they disappear into a white light.

== Cast ==
- Lee Pace as Mark Bennett - Father
- Carrie Coon as Elizabeth Welles - Mother
- Sander Thomas as Jacob - Son
- Ray Baker as Lenn - Mark's father
- Amy Smart as Amy - Neighbor lady
- Julian Latourelle as Dash - Neighbor boy
- Ana Ortiz as Janice Trejada - Psychic medium
- Molly Hagan as Daniels - Mark's boss
- Brianne Howey as Caroline
- Anna Diop as Kate
- Jane Daly as Elizabeth's Mom
- Cliff Chamberlain as Smith - Elizabeth's new husband
- Lylah Raye Acosta as Emma - Step-daughter
- Ruby Moncrieff-Karten as Isabelle - Step-daughter

== Production ==
On October 14, 2015, it was announced that Karen Moncrieff would direct a supernatural romance horror film scripted by Rebecca Sonnenshine, about two parents whose life together ends when their son dies in a car accident. Lee Pace and Carrie Coon were cast in the film to play the parents, while Jason Blum would produce the film through his Blumhouse Productions.

Principal photography on the film began on December 1, 2015, in Los Angeles, which ended on January 22, 2016.
