= Giovanni di Lorenzo (journalist) =

German-Italian journalist (born 1959)

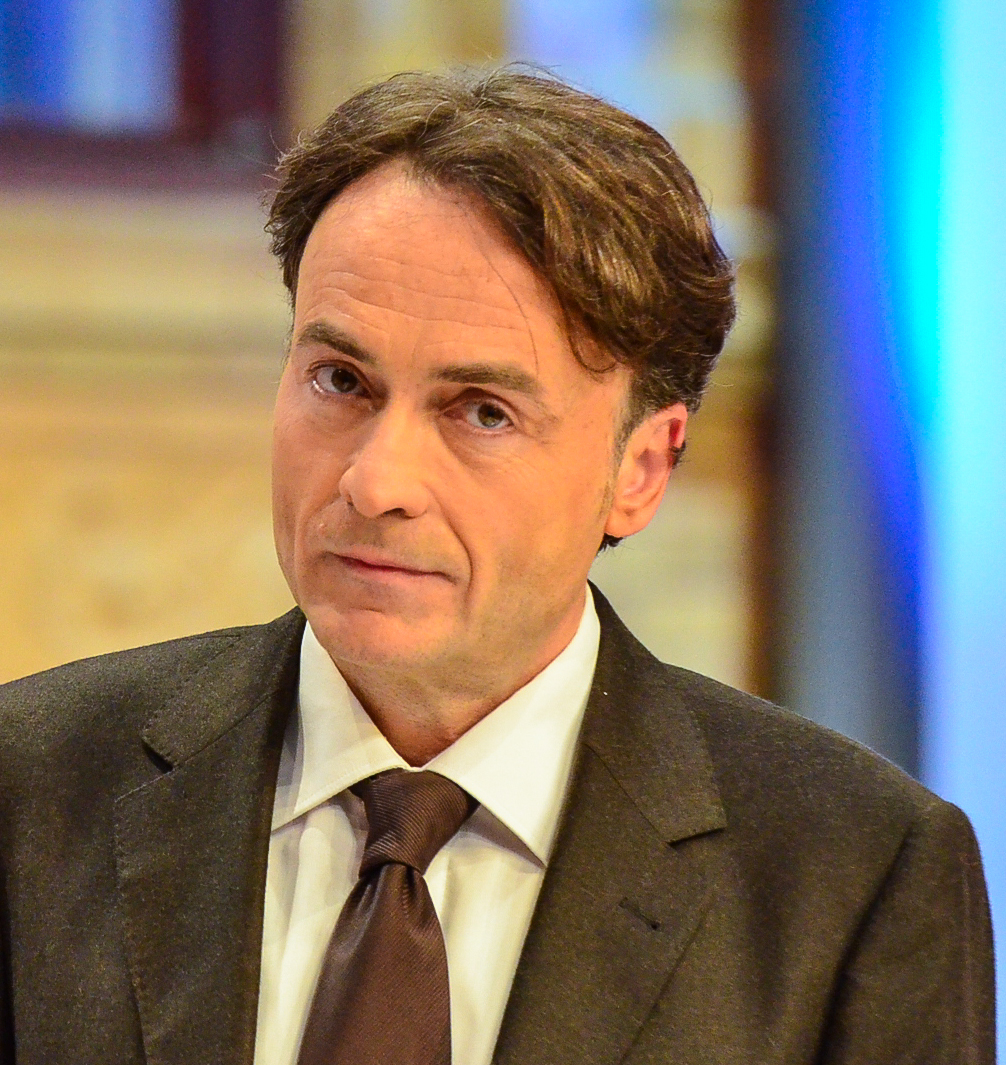
di Lorenzo in 2013

Giovanni di Lorenzo (Italian pronunciation: [dʒoˈvanni di loˈrɛntso]; born 9 March 1959) is a German-Italian journalist. He is editor-in-chief (since 2004) of German nationwide weekly newspaper Die Zeit and former editor-in-chief of Berlin's liberal daily newspaper Der Tagesspiegel (1999–2004; has since retained the position of publisher). Additionally di Lorenzo is a prominent talk show host for the Radio Bremen show 3 nach 9 airing monthly on NDR.

== Biography ==
Giovanni di Lorenzo was born 9 March 1959, in Stockholm, Sweden to a German mother and an Italian father. He spent his early childhood in Rimini and Rome, Italy. After his parents' separation, he and his mother moved to Hanover, Germany. He is a citizen of both Germany and Italy.

At the age of 15, upon seeing an edition of 3 nach 9 (lit. '3 past 9', named after its regular airing time) on the family's first black-and-white TV-set, di Lorenzo allegedly announced his wish to someday host the show. Today, after nearly 16 years on the job, di Lorenzo is the longest serving host on 3 nach 9.

In Hanover di Lorenzo attended the Ratsgymnasium and the Tellkampfschule, from which he graduated in 1979. During his senior year of high school, an internship at Hanover's daily newspaper Neue Presse prompted di Lorenzo to pursue a career in journalism. He continued working for Neue Presse until 1982. It was there where he met his future mentor Michael Radtke. His first article was published under the pseudonym Hans Lorentz, because the editor in charge believed his name to be a pen name and felt it sounded too construed.

Di Lorenzo attended LMU Munich, where he majored in communication studies, modern history, and political science. His Master's thesis was entitled Strategie und Aufstieg des Privatfernsehens in Italien am Beispiel der Networks von Silvio Berlusconi (Strategy and Ascent of Private Television in Italy Exemplified by the Networks of Silvio Berlusconi) and earned him the highest possible grade.

== Personal life ==
Di Lorenzo is a passionate cook. Learning how to cook, he stated, was an "act of self-defense," as his mother was not particularly talented in the kitchen. After their move to Hanover, di Lorenzo quickly felt the need to emulate his father, who is also a good cook. Because of his demanding work schedule, he now often lacks time to go about his hobby, something he deeply regrets. From 2005 to 2015 he had a relationship with Sabrina Staubitz (born 1968), their daughter was born in 2008.

Di Lorenzo is a citizen of both Germany and Italy. In the aftermath of the European Parliament election on 25 May 2014, he said on a talk show that he had voted twice, once in the Italian consulate and again in a local German school. It was quickly pointed out to him that every EU citizen was allowed only one vote, and that he effectively admitted to voter fraud on national television. He soon made a statement that he was unaware of the law in this case (even though Die Zeit ran an article pointing it out just days earlier) and apologized.

== Other activities ==
- Reporters Without Borders Germany, Member of the Board of Trustees
- Hamburger Theaterfestival, Member of the Board of Trustees
- Federal Chancellor Helmut Schmidt Foundation, Member of the Board of Trustees (since 2017)
- Hildegard-von-Bingen-Preis für Publizistik, Member of the Board of Trustees
- Institute for Media and Communication Policy (IfM), Senat
- M100 Sanssouci Colloquium, Member of the Board
- ZEIT-Stiftung, Member of the Board of Trustees (since 2010)

== Awards ==
- 2006 Medienpreis für Sprachkultur – category press
- 2005 Ischia International Journalism Award
- 2001 Preis der europäischen Presse – RAI/Radiotelevisione Italiana
- 2001 Goldene Feder for his work as editor-in-chief of Der Tagesspiegel
- 2001 München leuchtet
- 1993 Theodor-Wolff-Preis
- 1992 Bambi
- 1986 Adolf-Grimme-Preis
