= Chariot d'étoiles =

Single by Melody

from the album Danse ta vie
- Released: 1990
- Genre: Pop
- Length: 3:40
- Label: Orlando / Carrère Distribution 14873
- Songwriter(s): Jean-Marie Moreau; Jean-Pierre Millers
- Producer(s): Jean-Pierre Millers; Orlando

Melody singles chronology
"Y'a pas que les grands qui rêvent" (1989)	"Chariot d'étoiles" (1990)	"Le Prince du roller" (1990)

"Chariot d'étoiles" is the second single by Belgian singer Melody. She released it in 1990.

The song debuted in France at number 42 during the week of 10 March 1990, climbing to number 15 for one week in May.

The song would later appear on Melody's debut album, Danse ta vie, which was to be released in 1991.

== Track listing ==
single 7" (Carrère 14873)
No.	Title	Writer(s)	Length
1.	"Chariot d'étoiles"	J.-M. Moreau / J.-P. Millers	3:40
2.	"Chariot d'étoiles" (Version instrumentale)	J.-M. Moreau / J.-P. Millers	3:40

== Charts ==
Chart (1990)	Peak position
France (SNEP)	15
