= Melody 34 =

Sailboat class

Development
- Designer: Andre Mauric; Gilles Vaton
- Location: France
- Year: 1974
- No. built: 607
- Builder: Jeanneau
- Role: Cruiser
- Name: Melody 34

Boat
- Displacement: 13,330 lb (6,046 kg)
- Draft: 6.23 ft (1.90 m)

Hull
- Type: monohull
- Construction: fiberglass
- LOA: 33.63 ft (10.25 m)
- LWL: 28.50 ft (8.69 m)
- Beam: 11.09 ft (3.38 m)
- Engine: 27 hp (20 kW) inboard diesel engine

Hull appendages
- Keel: fin keel
- Ballast: 6,393 lb (2,900 kg)
- Rudder: skeg-mounted rudder

Rig
- Rig type: Bermuda rig
- I foretriangle height: 46.50 ft (14.17 m)
- J foretriangle base: 14.80 ft (4.51 m)
- P mainsail luff: 42.40 ft (12.92 m)
- E mainsail foot: 11.90 ft (3.63 m)

Sails
- Sailplan: masthead sloop
- Mainsail area: 269 sq ft (25.0 m^{2})
- Jib/genoa area: 226 sq ft (21.0 m^{2})
- Spinnaker area: 1,076 sq ft (100.0 m^{2})
- Other sails: genoa: 538 sq ft (50.0 m^{2}) solent: 355 sq ft (33.0 m^{2}) storm jib: 97 sq ft (9.0 m^{2})
- Upwind sail area: 807 sq ft (75.0 m^{2})
- Downwind sail area: 1,345 sq ft (125.0 m^{2})

The Melody 34 is a type of cruiser, a class of French sailboat that was designed by Andre Mauric and Gilles Vaton of the design firm Bureau Mauric. The first example of a Melody 34 was built in 1974.

== Production ==
The design was built by Jeanneau in France, from 1974 until 1982, with 607 boats built.

== Design ==
The Melody 34 is a recreational keelboat, built predominantly of fiberglass, with wood trim. It has a masthead sloop rig, with a deck-stepped mast, one set of straight spreaders and aluminum spars with stainless steel wire rigging. The hull has a raked stem, a reverse transom a skeg-mounted rudder controlled by a tiller and a fixed swept fin keel. It displaces 13,330 lb (6,046 kg) and carries 6,393 lb (2,900 kg) of cast iron ballast.

The boat has a draft of 6.23 ft (1.90 m) with the standard keel.

The boat is fitted with an inboard diesel engine of 18 or 27 hp (13 or 20 kW) for docking and maneuvering. The fuel tank holds 24 U.S. gallons (91 L; 20 imp gal) and the fresh water tank has a capacity of 48 U.S. gallons (180 L; 40 imp gal).

The design has sleeping accommodation for eight people, with a double "V"-berth in the bow cabin, an L-shaped settee and a straight settee in the main cabin and an aft cabin with a double berth on the starboard side. The galley is located on the port side at the companionway ladder. The galley is U-shaped and is equipped with a three-burner stove, ice box and a double sink. A navigation station is opposite the galley, on the starboard side. The head is located just aft of the bow cabin on the starboard side. Cabin headroom is 74 in (188 cm).

For sailing downwind the design may be equipped with a symmetrical spinnaker of 1,076 sq ft (100.0 m^{2}).

The design has a hull speed of 7.16 kn (13.26 km/h).

== Operational history ==
Melody 34s have been sailed on extensive cruising voyages, including in the Caribbean.

== See also ==
- List of sailing boat types
