= Melody Sze =

Hong Kong opera singer

Melody Siu-Wan Sze is a mezzo-soprano singer, voice teacher and singing coach. She earned her doctorate of Musical Arts in the United States and teaches in Hong Kong.

== Early life ==
Sze was born in Hong Kong. She obtained her Doctor of Musical Arts degree from Michigan State University (MSU), majoring in vocal performance and choral conducting as cognate and a Master of Music in Vocal Performance from the New England Conservatory of Music in Boston with academic honors. She holds a Professional Diploma in Western Opera from The Hong Kong Academy for Performing Arts (HKAPA) with full tuition scholarship; and Bachelor of Arts degree in Music with honors from The Chinese University of Hong Kong. She was a recipient of multiple scholarships, including the Michigan State University Dissertation Completion Fellowship, Hong Kong Arts Development Council Scholarship, the Bernard Van Zuiden Music Fund, as well as the Jockey Club Music and Dance Fund. She was a winner in NATS Michigan audition Advanced Men and Women.

Besides giving private voice lessons, she teaches at the Hong Kong Academy for Performing Arts, the Hong Kong Baptist University, and the Chinese University of Hong Kong.

== Career ==
Sze was one of the most active performing singers in Hong Kong. Her operatic career highlights include singing Zheng Yi Sao in The Legend of Zhang Baozai at the Shanghai Grand Theatre as part of the World Expo 2010Candarmen and the leading role Mother in Amahl and the Night Visitors produced by Musica Viva. Other overseas engagements include Grand Rapids Opera (USA) production of Georges Bizet’s Carmen as Mercédès, at Beijing’s National Center for the Performing Arts as the Second Lady in The Magic Flute, as well as the Macao International Music Festival production of Puccini’s Suor Angelica as The Nursing Sister.

She performed principal roles in Rossini's La Cenerentola as Cinderella, De Falla’s El Retablo de Maese Pedro as The Boy, Daniel Catán’s Florencia en el Amazonas as Paula, Mozart’s Don Giovanni as Elvira, Offenbach’s The Tales of Hoffmann as Nicklausse, Britten’s Turn of the Screw as Mrs. Grose, Smetana’s The Bartered Bride as Ludmilla, and the première of the Cantonese musical Boys and Girls as Susan. Hong Kong productions of Verdi’s La Traviata as Flora, Bizet’s Carmen as Mercédès, Gounod’s Roméo et Juliette as Stephano, Massenet’s Manon as Javotte, and Hong Kong International Opera Production of Gounod’s Faust as Siebel, Musica Viva's La Fille du Régiment as Marquise, Cavalleria Rusticana as Lola, City Opera’s Orphée aux enfers as Juno, La Vie parisienne as Louise, La Veuve Joyeuse as Manon.

Besides operas, Sze has performed actively as a concert soloist. Her repertoire includes Mahler’s Song of a Wayfarer and Symphony No.8, Bach's Magnificat, Haydn’s Harmoniemesse, Beethoven’s Symphony No. 9, Saint-Saëns' Christmas Oratorio, McCartney’s Liverpool Oratorio, Mozart’s Requiem, Schubert’s Mass in A♭ and Magnificat in C, Handel’s Messiah, Vivaldi’s Gloria (RV 588 and RV 589), Imant Ramish’s Magnificat, De Falla’s Siete Canciones Populares Españolas, Schnittke’s Requiem, and other major vocal works. She has also appeared as a solo artist in Verdi's Commemoration Concert and the Chinese Composer Festival Concert.
