= Melodic (disambiguation) =

Melodic means relating to or having melody. It may also refer to:

- Melodic (magazine) (melodic.net), an online magazine
- Melodic Magazine (melodicmag.com), an online music magazine
- Melodic Records, a record label
- Melodics, features of melody
