= Melodia =

Melodia may refer to:

== Music ==
- Luiz Melodia (1951–2017), a Brazilian singer and songwriter
- Melodía, an album by Spanish singer Melody (2004)
- Melodia (album), an album by the Vines (2008)
- Melodia (label), a Soviet music label
- "Melodia", an Italian song, adapted into English as "The Way It Used to Be" (Engelbert Humperdinck song)
- Melodia Women's Choir of New York City, a choral organization

== Other uses ==
- Melodia (personification), the personification of Melody in medieval Byzantine iconography
- Melodia, a fictional music-based villain from the animated television series SilverHawks
- Cadena Melodía, a Colombian radio network
  - Melodía FM Estéreo, a radio station in Bogotá, Colombia, part of the Cadena Melodía network

== See also ==
- Melodica, a musical instrument
- Melospiza melodia, or song sparrow
- Melody (disambiguation)
