= Karen Moncrieff =

American actress, director and screenwriter

- Born: December 20, 1963 (age 62); Sacramento, California
- Occupations: Film director, screenwriter, actress

Karen Moncrieff (born December 20, 1963, in Sacramento, California) is an American actress, director and screenwriter. She is best known as the writer and director of critically acclaimed films Blue Car and The Dead Girl.

Movies she has directed have won several awards. The Dead Girl won the Deauville American Film Festival's grand prize in 2007. The Keeping Hours won the Audience Award for Fiction Feature Film at the L.A. Film Fest in 2017.

Her directing credits are in both television and features, and she has acted in the soap operas Days of Our Lives and Santa Barbara. In 1985, she was crowned Miss Illinois and competed in the Miss America 1986 pageant. She graduated from Rochester Adams High School in 1982.

== Filmography ==
Year	Title	Role	Notes
1986	Guiding Light	Patricia Murphy	
1987	Days of Our Lives	Gabrielle Pascal	Episode #5572
1989	The Bold and the Beautiful	Dr. Michelle Brookner	9 episodes
1990	Matlock	Miss Eberhardt	Episode: "The Witness"
1990–1992	Santa Barbara	Cassandra Benedict	278 episodes
1993	Midnight Witness	Katy	
1993	Rage	Sarah Dameron	
1993	Renegade	Cynthia Mainard	Episode: "No Good Deed"
1993	Perry Mason	Mimi Hoyle	Episode: "Perry Mason: The Case of the Killer Kiss"
1993	Wings	Deidre	Episode: "Come Fly With Me"
1993–1994	Silk Stalkings	Various roles	2 episodes
1994	Murder Between Friends	Amy Morin	
1995	Robin's Hoods	Heather	Episode: "Hell Hath No Fury"
1995	Nowhere Man	Pam Peterson	Episode: "A Rough Whimper of Insanity"
1995	Xtro 3: Watch the Skies	J.G. Watkins	
1995	Russian Roulette: Moscow 95	Uncredited	
1996–1997	Diagnosis Murder	Dr. Claire Hartman	2 episodes
1997	Unhappily Ever After	Zelda	Episode: "Sternberg"
1998	Mike Hammer, Private Eye	Lucille Banks	Episode: "A Candidate for Murder"
1998	Waking Up Horton	Miriam	
1998–2000	Any Day Now	Uncredited	2 episodes
2002	Blue Car	Director and writer	
2003	Six Feet Under	Director	Episode "The Opening"
2004	Touching Evil	Director	Episode "Slash 30"
2006	The Dead Girl	Director and Writer	
2013	The Trials of Cate McCall	Director, Writer, and Producer	
2014	Petals on the Wind	Director	
2017	The Keeping Hours	Director	
2018	The Quad	Director	Episode "Native Son"
2018	13 Reasons Why	Director	2 episodes
2018	The Girl in the Bathtub	Director and Writer	
2019	Escaping the Madhouse: The Nellie Big Story	Director	
2020	Paradise Lost	Director	2 episodes
