= My Melody =

My Melody may refer to:

- My Melody, a fictional character created by Sanrio
- My Melody (Queen Pen album), 1997
- My Melody (Stereo Total album), 1999
- My Melody (Deniece Williams album), 1981
- "My Melody", a 1987 song by Eric B. & Rakim from Paid in Full
- "My Melody", a 2017 song by Loona from YeoJin
- "My Melody", a 2022 song by Doda from Aquaria (deluxe edition)

== See also ==
- Onegai My Melody, a 2005 Japanese anime series based on the Sanrio character
