= Archive 81 =

American streaming television series

- Promotional poster
- Genre: Analog horror; Drama; Mystery thriller; Supernatural
- Based on: Archive 81 by Daniel Powell and Marc Sollinger
- Developed by: Rebecca Sonnenshine
- Starring: Mamoudou Athie; Dina Shihabi; Evan Jonigkeit; Julia Chan; Ariana Neal; Matt McGorry; Martin Donovan
- Music by: Ben Salisbury and Geoff Barrow
- Country of origin: United States
- Original language: English
- No. of seasons: 1
- No. of episodes: 8

Production
- Executive producers: Rebecca Sonnenshine; Rebecca Thomas; James Wan; Michael Clear; Paul Harris Boardman; Antoine Douaihy
- Producers: Bobak Esfarjani; Amanda Kay Price
- Cinematography: Julie Kirkwood; Bobby Bukowski; Nathaniel Goodman
- Editors: Tyler L. Cook; Michael Scotti Jr.; Amelia Allwarden; Patrick J. Smith; Joel T. Pashby
- Running time: 45–58 minutes
- Production companies: Atomic Monster; Sonnenshine Productions

Original release
- Network: Netflix
- Release: January 14, 2022

Archive 81 is an American supernatural horror television series developed by Rebecca Sonnenshine, who was also an executive producer for the show, along with Paul Harris Boardman and James Wan. The series was released on Netflix on January 14, 2022. Between January 9 and 30, the series was watched for 128.47 million hours globally according to Netflix Top 10s. However, in March 2022, the series was canceled after one season.

The series is based on the podcast of the same name that began in 2016. Mamoudou Athie and Dina Shihabi star as Dan, examining video tapes in the present, and Melody, who recorded the tapes in 1994. Dan is hired by a mysterious company to restore video footage of grad student Melody's documentary project on an apartment building that burned down, but the job is not what it seems and suddenly, Dan finds himself in the middle of a dangerous mystery involving a disappearance and a secret cult.

== Cast and characters ==
=== Main ===
- Mamoudou Athie as Dan Turner
- Dina Shihabi as Melody Pendras
- Evan Jonigkeit as Samuel Spare / Alexander Davenport
- Julia Chan as Anabelle Cho
- Ariana Neal as Jess Lewis
- Matt McGorry as Mark Higgins
- Martin Donovan as Virgil Davenport

=== Supporting ===
- Charlie Hudson III as Dr Steve Turner
- Kate Eastman as Tamara Stefano
- Eden Marryshow as John Smith
- Georgina Haig as Iris Vos
- Kristin Griffith as Cassandra Wall
- Emy Coligado as Helen Yung

== Production ==
=== Development ===
On October 26, 2020, it was announced that Rebecca Sonnenshine would be the executive producer and showrunner of a horror television series for Netflix and Atomic Monster, with Paul Harris Boardman as writer and executive producer, and James Wan also executive producing. The series was inspired by the podcast of the same name. On January 5, 2022, it was reported that Michael Clear, Rebecca Thomas, and Antoine Douaihy were executive producing the series as well. Archive 81 was released on January 14, 2022, on Netflix. On March 24, 2022, Netflix canceled the series after one season.

=== Casting ===
Along with the announcement, Mamoudou Athie and Dina Shihabi were cast in the series. In November that same year, Martin Donovan, Matt McGorry, Julia Chan, Evan Jonigkeit, and Ariana Neal joined the cast.

=== Filming ===
Principal photography began on November 16, 2020, and concluded on March 29, 2021, in Pittsburgh, Pennsylvania, with Rebecca Thomas directing half of the series.

== Reception ==
The review aggregator website Rotten Tomatoes reported an 85% approval rating with an average rating of 7.1/10, based on 34 critic reviews. The website's critics' consensus reads, "An intriguing blend of horror and noir, Archive 81 offers addictive supernatural thrills that are haunting in the best way." Metacritic, which uses a weighted average, assigned a score of 73 out of 100 based on 16 critics, indicating "generally favorable reviews".

Professional critics highlighted the series' atmospheric horror, suspense, and character-driven storytelling. Lucy Mangan of The Guardian praised the show's performances, jump scares, and conspiracy-driven storyline, describing it as an entertaining horror series, although she noted that its slow pacing and plot inconsistencies could become tiring for viewers. Saloni Gajjar of The A.V. Club praised the series' found-footage storytelling, character-driven mysteries, and atmospheric tension, particularly highlighting the performances of Mamoudou Athie and Dina Shihabi. However, Gajjar noted that the series introduced more supernatural concepts than it was able to fully develop.

When the show debuted, it broke into the Nielsen streaming rankings at number seven, and it reached as high as number two in its second week.

== Episodes ==
No.	Title	Directed by	Written by	Original release date
1	"Mystery Signals"	Rebecca Thomas	Teleplay by : Paul Harris Boardman and Rebecca Sonnenshine	January 14, 2022
Dan Turner is a conservator who is asked to work on a Hi8 tape. He restores it and watches the introduction to Melody's PhD dissertation in 1994 about an apartment building called the Visser. The tape restoration is for Virgil Davenport of a corporation called LMG; Virgil invites him to fix the rest of the tapes. Though he finds it strange that Virgil somehow knows that Dan's family died in a fire when he was young, he eventually accepts after declining the first time. As the tapes are too fragile to be moved, he goes to live in a research campus owned by LMG, in a rural wooded area. Virgil gives Dan a bracelet that can summon emergency medical staff as there is no cell service or Internet in the area, and Dan has a history of mental health issues. Melody looks for Jess, a kid from the building that she claims was taken. As she is fighting with the guards, Dan's father, Dr. Steve Turner, arrives and tries talking her down. Dan is left shocked about his father's connection. It is revealed that Dan is being watched.
2	"Wellspring"	Rebecca Thomas	Rebecca Sonnenshine	January 14, 2022
Dan calls his friend Mark from his cellphone in the woods, realizing that Virgil searched him out intentionally. Mark convinces him to keep working on the tapes to understand why his father was involved. Jess introduces Melody to more of the Visser's residents, including Beatriz, and Samuel, who asks her out. Dr. Turner leaves a message on the answering machine for Melody, revealing she is a patient of his. She deletes it. While looking for cell service, Dan sees a child in a red jacket outside the fence who flees. He finds a secret area in the research facility, and Virgil tells him that Dr. Turner may have set the fire that killed Dan's family. One night, Melody finds many residents including Samuel in the basement, worshipping a statue. Mark reveals to Dan that Melody is alive and did not die in the Visser fire.
3	"Terror in the Aisles"	Justin Benson & Aaron Moorhead	Michael Narducci	January 14, 2022
As a baby, Melody was left in a church by her mother Julia Bennett. She was then raised in an orphanage run by nuns. She would also have black-out spells. Dan taps into the security cameras and begins mapping where they are. Jess is experiencing seizures so she goes to Dr. Turner. Jess' mother believes that Father Russo will rid Jess of her seizures. Mark visits Melody in present day. She says that the tapes have all been faked and Mark realizes that she is just impersonating Melody: the real Melody is dead. In the past, Melody finds Jess tied to a chair in her apartment while Father Russo tries to perform an exorcism. Samuel bursts in and throws Russo out, promising to get Jess proper help. Father Russo warns Melody to leave while she still can. Dan has been dreaming that he can talk to Melody.
4	"Spirit Receivers"	Justin Benson & Aaron Moorhead	Evan Bleiweiss	January 14, 2022
Dan begins losing time when he sees Melody. Melody interviews Mrs. Wall and sees the statue the group was worshipping in Mrs. Wall's apartment. Mrs. Wall calls them a cult and shows Melody her pendant; Melody sees a disturbing image in it; Wall gives Annabelle a jar of black paint her 'sister' Eleanor used for her work. In the present, Dan tells Melody who his father is; she gets upset. When she vanishes, a journal is left there. Written by T. Bellows, the journals reveal the code to get in the locked room off the church. Once in, Dan finds a paper Dr. Turner wrote about cross-dimensional bridges. Mark is asked by Virgil to spy on Dan. At Mrs. Wall's party, Beatriz performs a seance to contact Melody's mother but senses another force. Dan's computer freezes then and Melody appears. He explains that she died 25 years ago. She disappears and Beatriz recites pieces of conversations Melody and Dan have had, including the one that just happened. Overwhelmed, Beatriz begins tearing her own face off. In Melody's apartment, Annabelle claims there is a person in the dozens of paintings she just made with Eleanor's paint.
5	"Through the Looking Glass"	Haifaa Al Mansour	Bobak Esfarjani	January 14, 2022
Beatriz warns Melody, "Don't let it out." Dr. Turner tells Melody that he tried to sign her up for a study researching people with sensitivities, whom he called Baldung, but she was rejected. Melody discovers that Father Russo died after going to a mysterious meeting the night before. She discovers that Father Russo had been investigating the Visser and that Samuel has multiple fake identities. In Father Russo's research she finds descriptions of a cult called the Baldung Coven and an image of a statue like the one she saw in the community room. The statue depicts a being called Kaelego, who is both god and demon. Melody realizes her mother's ring has the Baldung Sigil on it. At the art show, she sees that Annabelle's work is covered in mold and the paintings are all of the same woman. She confronts Samuel when Chris, a junkie, falls from the building dead. Watching Melody's footage, Dan sees Virgil share a look with Samuel on the street immediately following Chris' death. Virgil tells Dan that Samuel was his brother and that he thinks Melody murdered Samuel and may have set the fire that killed Dan's family.
6	"The Circle"	Haifaa Al Mansour	Helen Leigh	January 14, 2022
Mark tells Dan he has found Thomas Bellows. Thomas was hired by Virgil to digitize VHS tapes. He experienced delusions in the research facility and died after leaving. Dan breaks all the cameras in the facility. Melody learns that Annabelle had a psychotic break and injured two people at the art show. She discovers that Mrs. Wall is poisoning people with mold and goes to inspect the source but is caught by Samuel. Dan discovers that Thomas was seeing the same face in the tapes as Dan. Samuel takes Melody to the ritual room. The song she has been hearing is actually a prayer and her feeling ill when she hears it means she is the "right one." Samuel shows Melody the snuff film, which is a ritual that was performed in the building the Visser was built on top of. Melody realizes that Jess is the sacrifice to "hold the new world." Dr. Turner shows up to have Melody committed to a psych ward. A demon tries crawling through the screen to get Dan so he smashes all the screens and tapes. He discovers a room similar to the one in the snuff film and is knocked unconscious.
7	"The Ferryman"	Rebecca Thomas	Rebecca Sonnenshine	January 14, 2022
Dan wakes up in his apartment, confused and without his mobile phone. He goes to confront Virgil at LMG but is threatened with legal action to stop him from continuing his investigation. Mark fills Dan in about what he has found regarding the Vos Society and William Crest. Dan realizes that the woman Annabel was painting is Iris Vos. The episode then transitions to 1924: a woman named Rose is being interviewed for the position of maid in the Vos household and witnesses the arrival of the Kaelego statue. Iris leads a group in prayer to Kaelego. Later, Rose finds Iris bloodied after a miscarriage. The mold appears in the mansion and Iris sees it as a sign from her god. A Baldung witch - who had attended an earlier party at the mansion under a false name - attempts to steal the ritual book but Jonah Vos shoots her. The Vos family plans to perform the ritual but Lukas Vos leaves because he cannot reconcile himself with human sacrifice or the potential consequences. Iris proceeds with the ritual, which Jonah films (this is the origin of the snuff movie William Crest saw). When Iris slits Rose's throat, a mysterious light appears which disrupts the film, ending the recording. Mark and Dan find Annabelle, who says that Melody has been waiting for Dan in the Otherworld.
8	"What Lies Beneath"	Rebecca Thomas	Evan Bleiweiss & Michael Narducci	January 14, 2022
Steve reunites Melody with Annabelle in the psychiatric facility, but he will not let Melody leave for her own safety. She escapes to save Jess. Annabelle gives Dan a box of tapes that Jess left for him. The tapes show Melody returning to save Jess. Melody convinces Jess to escape, but Melody is knocked unconscious by John Smith. Samuel and the cult members proceed with the ritual and use Tamara in place of Jessica. Iris appears in the portal, which Samuel and Melody enter. Jess returns with her camera, but runs out of the building as the ritual ends in flames. Virgil declines to help Dan find Melody. Mark and Dan decide to try the ritual themselves, but Bobbi stops them at gunpoint revealing herself to be a Baldung and Melody's birth mother. Bobbi sends Dan to the Otherworld where he sees his late family before finding Melody. Dan finds Melody and they make their way to the portal exit, pursued by Kaelego. Samuel appears at the exit, pulling Melody through. Melody and her mother are reunited, and Mark frantically calls for Dan. Dan awakens in a hospital bed to discover the year is 1994, weeks after the Visser fire.
