= Melody (building) =

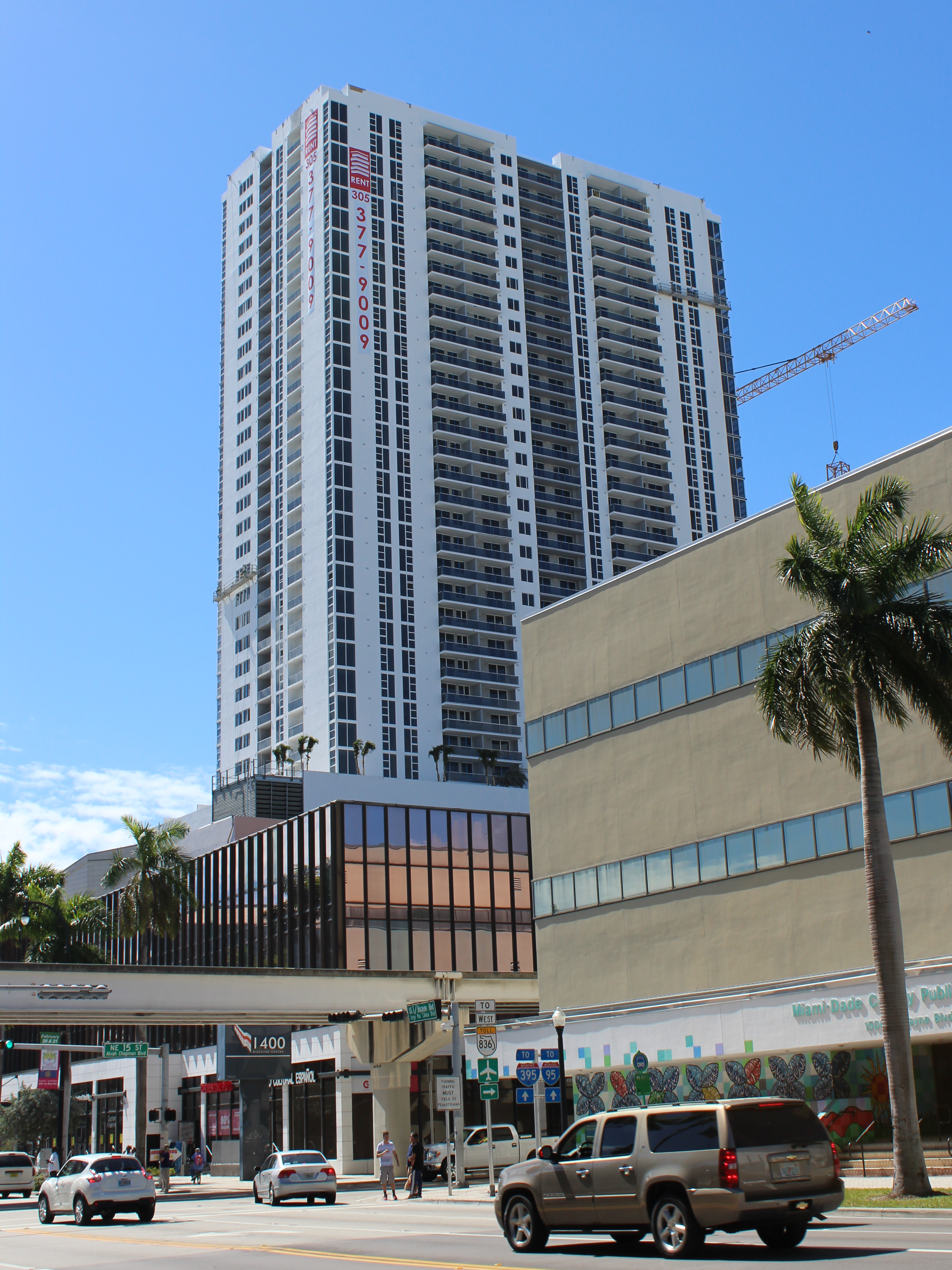
- Melody under construction
- Interactive map of the Melody area

General information
- Status: Completed
- Type: Residential
- Location: 245 NE 14th Street Miami, Florida, United States
- Coordinates: 25.78849°N 80.19007°W
- Construction started: June 2014
- Completed: May 2016

Height
- Roof: 467 ft (142 m)

Technical details
- Floor count: 36

Design and construction
- Architect: Itec Design

Melody is a residential high-rise building completed in May 2016 in the Arts & Entertainment District neighborhood of Miami, Florida, U.S.A. The building rises about 467 feet (142 m) with 36 floors and contains nearly 500 rental units. It is located about one block from the Adrienne Arsht Center/Omni Metromover and Metrobus hub.

== See also ==
- List of tallest buildings in Miami
