= Melody Sucharewicz =

Israeli television star and foreign advisor

- 'מלודי סוכרוויץ
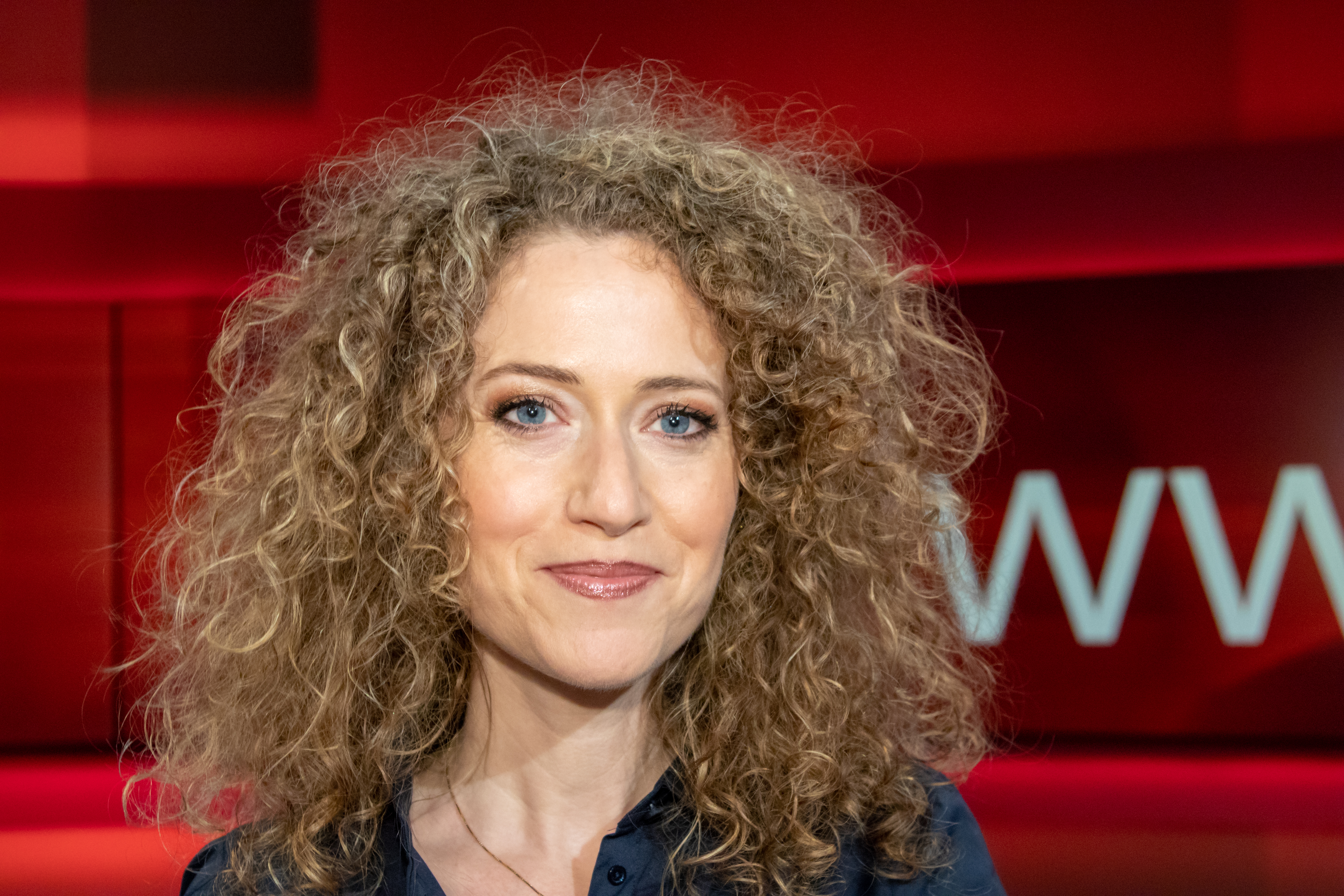
- Sucharewicz in 2018
- Born: April 12, 1980 (age 46); Munich, West Germany
- Education: Tel Aviv University
- Known for: Television appearances

Dr. Melody Sucharewicz (Hebrew: מלודי סוכרביץ; born April 12, 1980) is the winner of the second and final season of Israel's popular TV show, The Ambassador, and a former foreign affairs adviser and spokesperson of Israeli former alternate Prime Minister, Defense Minister and IDF Chief of Staff Benny Gantz. Since the Hamas-led October 7 attacks in Israel in 2023, Sucharewicz has led a solidarity campaign for the families of Israeli hostages with German citizenship, supporting their efforts to mobilize the German public and political establishment to call for the release of their loved ones.

"The Ambassador" is a reality series similar in format to the American The Apprentice game show, though its theme focuses on public diplomacy and political PR instead of business. Elected among hundreds of candidates. The aim is to choose a spokesperson for Israel from among several thousands of young professionals. Rhetoric and diplomatic skills, social competence, coping with hostile media, and skills in creative political PR of 14 final candidates were tested throughout a series of international challenges (Uganda, Sweden, Russia, United States), later broadcast on Israel's Channel Two. The three finalists of the show held speeches on their vision of peace at the headquarters of the United Nations in New York.

Chosen as the winner in 2006 by a high-profile committee (IDF General Gil Regev, journalist Rina Mazliach, media anchor Nachman Shai), Sucharewicz traveled around the world as a goodwill ambassador for Israel for one year. Her activities ranged from speaking engagements at the European Parliament to media appearances, publications and interviews concerning Israel's perception in the media and the Middle East peace process.

Born in Munich, Germany in 1980, Sucharewicz immigrated to Israel at the age of 19, where she earned a B.A. in sociology and anthropology and an M.Sc. in management sciences at Tel Aviv University. She holds a PhD in War Studies from King's College London, with her dissertation focusing on deradicalization processes of former Islamist extremists and terrorists.

After serving as goodwill ambassador, she returned to Israel, where she worked as an international relations adviser for the Peres Center for Peace. She was also the director of the German Israel Congress, Europe's largest pro-Israel event with 3000 participants, aiming at strengthening bilateral ties between Israel and Germany. Sucharewicz continues to work as a representative for Israel, with most engagements taking place in Germany and Israel, where she works as a political communications and strategy consultant, moderates and speaks at high-profile conferences and events.

She, together with the "For Yarden" foundation established the Hostages Square installation in Berlin's historic Bebelplatz square.

== Awards ==
In 2024, Dr. Sucharewicz received the Honorary Award from the German NGO ELNET for her tireless support of the Israeli hostages' families' awareness campaign in Germany since the October 7 attacks.
