= Melody (Belgian singer) =

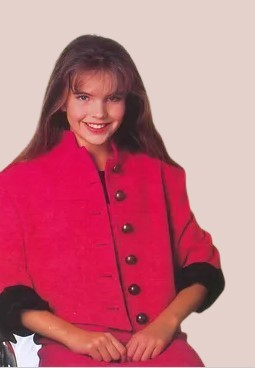

Background information
- Also known as: Nathalie Lefebvre
- Born: Nathalie T'Sobbel; 20 January 1977 (age 49)
- Origin: Ronse, Belgium
- Genres: Pop
- Occupation: Singer
- Years active: 1989–1993
- Label: Carrere

Nathalie Lefebvre (born T'Sobbel on 20 January 1977), known under the name of Melody, is a Belgian former singer. Although from Flanders, she sang mostly in French.

== Biography ==
Lefebvre was born at Ronse, Belgium. Discovered by Jean-Pierre Millers, Melody was produced by Dalida's brother, Orlando. In 1989, at the age of 12, she released her first single "Y'a pas que les grands qui rêvent", written by J.-P. Millers and Guy Carlier, which was a huge hit in France (#2, 28 weeks on the chart) and won an SACEM award. She also released other songs such as "Chariot d'étoiles", "Le Prince du roller" and "Mamie", which achieved a minor success.

She recorded an album in 1990, Danse ta vie, which was reissued in 1993 and containing two new songs. However, it passed unnoticed.

== Discography ==
=== Albums ===
- Danse ta vie
- Une Flèche en plein cœur
- Mon Cœur

=== Singles ===
- "Y'a pas que les grands qui rêvent" - #2 in France, Gold disc
- "Chariot d'étoiles" - #15 in France
- "Le Prince du roller"
- "Mamie"
- "Avoir 15 ans"
- "Djami"
- "Laissez-moi partir"
- "La Passoire à mensonges"
- "Adolescence"
- "Métamorphose"
- "Envie de tout"
