= Melody Diachun =

Canadian singer

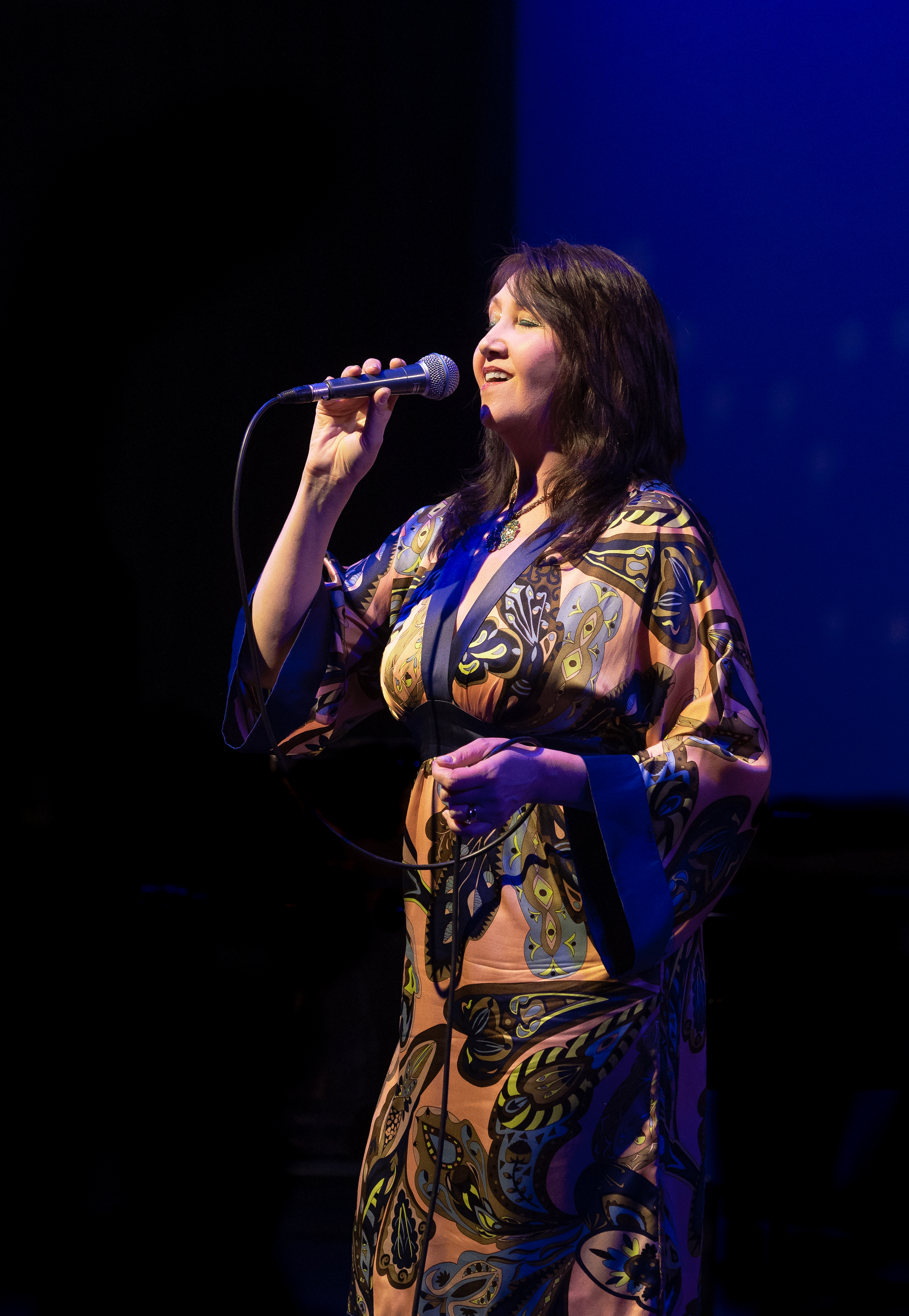
Melody Diachun Melody Diachun performs at the Jazz at The 'Bolt Festival, 2024
- Born: Melody Diachun; December 30, 1968 (age 57); Montreal, Québec, Canada
- Genres: Jazz, alternative jazz, contemporary jazz, R&B, pop
- Occupations: Singer, songwriter, arranger, performer
- Years active: 1992–present
- Labels: Third Beach Records, Cellar Live, independent
- Awards: Jazz Artist of the Year, 2023 Western Canadian Music Awards
- Website: melodydiachun.com

Melody Diachun (born December 30, 1968) is a Canadian singer, songwriter and recording artist. She won the Jazz Artist of the Year award at the 2023 Western Canadian Music Awards and was named the 2026 Cultural Ambassador for the City of Nelson, British Columbia.

== Biography ==
Diachun was born in Montréal, Québec and raised in Annapolis Royal, Nova Scotia. Singing from an early age and accompanied by her father Bill Diachun, a part-time singer and piano player, she began piano lessons at age 6 and played French horn and electric bass through junior and senior high school. At age 15 she took her first professional singing gig. At age 17 Diachun moved back to Montréal to attend McGill University where she was the first vocalist admitted to the school's Jazz Performance Program. Diachun earned her Bachelor of Music degree "with distinction" in Jazz Voice in 1994. After university, Diachun moved to New York City to study briefly with jazz vocalist Sheila Jordan under a grant from the Canada Council for the Arts.

In 1997, Diachun moved to Western Canada and began a long-term engagement at the Banff Springs Hotel where she met her future husband, guitarist, bassist, and mixing engineer Doug Stephenson. From 2000 to 2012 Diachun worked as a freelance vocalist in Vancouver, British Columbia. In 2012, Diachun began teaching at the Contemporary Music & Technology Program at Selkirk College in Nelson, British Columbia. She took on the role of School Chair of the School of Arts & Technology at Selkirk College in August 2022.

== Awards and honours ==
Year	Nominated work	Category	Award	Result	Notes	Ref.
2026	Melody Diachun	City of Nelson, British Columbia Awards	Cultural Ambassador Award	Won		
2023	Melody Diachun	Jazz Artist of The Year	Western Canadian Music Awards	Won		
2019	Melody Diachun	Artist of the Year	Kootenay Music Awards	Nominated		
2019	"Get Back to the Groove"	Best R&B Song	Kootenay Music Awards	Nominated	Songwriters: Melody Diachun, Doug Stephenson	
2019	"High Definition Love"	Best Pop Song	Kootenay Music Awards	Nominated	Songwriters: Melody Diachun/Doug Stephenson	
2018	Melody Diachun	Artist of the Year	Kootenay Music Awards	Nominated		
2018	"That's What Delete Is For"	Best Blues Song	Kootenay Music Awards	Nominated	Songwriter: Melody Diachun	
2009	Melody Diachun	Female Vocalist of the Year	Canadian National Jazz Awards	Nominated		
2008	Metaphora, Altered Laws	Outstanding Jazz Recording of The Year	Western Canadian Music Awards	Won	feat. Melody Diachun	
2008	Metaphora, Altered Laws	Contemporary Jazz Album of the Year	JUNO Awards	Nominated	feat. Melody Diachun	

== Discography ==
=== As leader ===
- Lullaby of the Leaves (self-release, 2002)
- Dreams & Places (self-released, 2006)
- EQ (Cellar Live, 2008)
- Get Back to the Groove (Third Beach, 2018)
- Sumner's Tales: The Music of Sting (Third Beach, 2022)

=== As guest ===
- Kris feat. Melody Diachun, Johanna Sillanpa, and Roger Mooking a.k.a. Roger Audio Truth Be Told (2006)
- Altered Laws featuring the Babayaga String Quartet and Melody Diachun Metaphora (Artist Jazz Records, 2007)
- Gabriel Mark Hasselbach with Jeff Lorber, Victor Bailey, Warren Hill (musician), Melody Diachun, Alan "Lupe" Smithee and Rock Hendricks Cool Down (Wind Tunnel, 2008)
- Dave Ronald So Alive (self-released, 2017)
- Tom Keenlyside Quartet A Night at the Espresso (Cellar Live, 2022)
