= Melody Harris-Jensbach =

Korean-American Manager (born 1961)

Melody Harris-Jensbach (born 1961) is a Korean-American manager. Currently she is CEO of the German outdoor apparel and equipment producer Jack Wolfskin.

== Career ==
She graduated at the Parsons School of Design in New York City. Due to her marriage, Melody Harris-Jensbach moved to Germany in 1986 where she first worked for the fashion firms Cartoon, Triangle and later became head designer for Viventy by Bernd Berger. In 1993 she became chief designer women's wear and accessories at Escada's label Laurèl, and a few years later, chief design and product manager at Fink Modelle.

As a next step in her career, Harris-Jensbach took the position of design director women's wear at Esprit in 1998. In 2003, she took on the responsibility as international product director women, and in 2005 she also took over the Women's Casual Division, Esprit's core business.

As Puma had stated in June 2007, Melody Harris-Jensbach joined the company's board of management as Deputy CEO in January 2008. She took over the position from Martin Gänsler and is responsible for the areas product, product development, design, business unit management and worldwide sourcing for the retail business. This made her the first female deputy CEO of a German company.

In November 2014, Harris-Jensbach has been nominated CEO of the Germany-based outdoor apparel and equipment producer Jack Wolfskin, a company owned by Callaway Golf.
