= Dina Shihabi =

Saudi Arabian actress (born 1989)

- دينا الشهابي
- Born: September 21, 1989 (age 37); Riyadh, Saudi Arabia
- Education: New York University (MFA)
- Occupation: Actress
- Years active: 2009–present
- Height: 166 cm (5 ft 5 in)
- Partner: Jai Courtney
- Children: 1

Dina Shihabi (Arabic: دينا الشهابي; born September 21, 1989) is a Saudi Arabian actress working in the United States.

== Early life and education ==
Shihabi was born in Riyadh, Saudi Arabia, and was raised in Saudi Arabia, Beirut, and Dubai. Her family is of Arab and European origin. She described her multi-ethnic background thusly: "I consider myself Arab European because my father Ali Shihabi is half-Saudi, half-Norwegian, and my mom Nadia is half-Arab, half-German and Haitian, but raised in France." She stated that she enjoyed watching films from an early age. Shihabi's father is a commentator on Saudi politics and a former banker. He was the chairman of Saudi Hollandi Bank.

== Career ==
At age 11 she began taking dance lessons from Sharmila Kamte, a renowned dance teacher at the Dubai Community Theatre and Arts Centre Chaloub Studio, known as the "dancing queen" of the United Arab Emirates. She became a member of her modern professional dance team.

In Dubai she attended Al Mawakeb School, Emirates International School, and Dubai American Academy. Shihabi performed in numerous school plays, and was encouraged by her teacher, Nancy Mock, to pursue an acting career.

At age 18, Shihabi moved to New York City in 2007 and began pursuing a career in acting; this became a full-time profession in 2010. She attended the American Academy of Dramatic Arts for two years. In 2011, she was accepted at both Juilliard and The graduate Acting Program at NYU Tisch School for the Arts. Although Shihabi did not complete a 4-year bachelor's degree (she attended the American Academy of Dramatic Arts, an Acting Conservatory from 2008 to 2010), NYU waived the requirement of a bachelor's degree, and she graduated with her MFA in 2014. She is the first Middle East-born woman to be accepted to both the Juilliard and NYU Graduate Acting programs, as well as the first Saudi Arabian woman accepted to these institutions.

In February 2019, it was announced that Shihabi was cast in the main role of Dig 301 for the second season of Netflix's science-fiction series, Altered Carbon.

== Activism ==
In September 2025, she signed an open pledge with Film Workers for Palestine pledging not to work with Israeli film institutions "that are implicated in genocide and apartheid against the Palestinian people."

== Personal life ==
Dina enjoys dancing as a hobby. Her native Arabic dialect is a form of Levantine Arabic.

== Filmography ==
Year	Title	Role	Notes
2011	David	Aishah	
2013	Ben		
2014	Amira & Sam	Amira Jafari	Shihabi's first major role
2015	Cigarette Soup		
2016	Cul-de-Sac (short film)		
2016	Madam Secretary (season 2)	Hijriyyah Al Bouri	
2017	Cherry Pop		
2018	Daredevil	Neda Kazemi	Episodes: "Resurrection"; "Please"
2018	Jack Ryan	Hanin Suleiman	Main role (Season 1)
2019	Ramy	Nour	Episode: "Between the Toes"
2020	Altered Carbon	Dig 301	Main role (Season 2)
2022	Archive 81	Melody Pendras	Main role
2022	These Are the Ways	Anthony Kiedis's baby mother	Music Video
2023	Catching Dust	Amaya	
2023	Ghosts of Beirut	Lena	Series for Showtime
2023	Painkiller	Britt Hufford	Miniseries; 6 episodes
2024	Accused	Jordan	Episode: "Val's Story"
