= 2026 Fangoria Chainsaw Awards =

Horror film awards

32nd Fangoria Chainsaw Awards
- Release poster
- Presented by: Fangoria
- Announced on: July 2, 2026
- Presented on: October 25, 2026
- Hosted by: Devon Sawa

Highlights
- Most nominations: 28 Years Later: The Bone Temple and Dust Bunny (9)

The 32nd Fangoria Chainsaw Awards honored the best horror films that were released between July 2025 and June 2026. The nominees were announced on July 2, 2026. The ceremony was livestreamed on Shudder on October 25, 2026.

Among the nominees, 28 Years Later: The Bone Temple and Dust Bunny led with nine nominations each.

== Winners and nominees ==
Best Wide Release	Best Limited Release
Obsession − Directed by Curry Barker; 28 Years Later: The Bone Temple − Directed by Nia DaCosta; Backrooms − Directed by Kane Parsons; The Bride! − Directed by Maggie Gyllenhaal; Faces of Death − Directed by Daniel Goldhaber; Forbidden Fruits − Directed by Meredith Alloway; Hokum − Directed by Damian McCarthy; Leviticus − Directed by Adrian Chiarella; Send Help − Directed by Sam Raimi; Weapons − Directed by Zach Cregger	Dust Bunny − Directed by Bryan Fuller; Mārama − Directed by Taratoa Stappard; Queens of the Dead − Directed by Tina Romero; The Serpent's Skin − Directed by Alice Maio Mackay; Touch Me − Directed by Addison Heimann
Best International Movie	Best Streaming Premiere
Exit 8 − Directed by Genki Kawamura (Japan); Alpha − Directed by Julia Ducournau (France); Mārama − Directed by Taratoa Stappard (New Zealand); Reflection in a Dead Diamond − Directed by Hélène Cattet and Bruno Forzani (Belgium); The Wailing − Directed by Pedro Martín-Calero (Spain)	V/H/S/Halloween − Directed by Bryan M. Ferguson, Casper Kelly, Micheline Pitt-Norman, R.H. Norman, Alex Ross Perry, Paco Plaza and Anna Zlokovic (Shudder); I Am Frankelda − Directed by Arturo and Roy Ambriz (Netflix); Influencers − Directed by Kurtis David Harder (Shudder); Mother of Flies − Directed by John Adams, Toby Poser and Zelda Adams (Shudder); Reflection in a Dead Diamond − Directed by Hélène Cattet and Bruno Forzani (Shudder)
Best Director	Best First Feature
Curry Barker − Obsession; Zach Cregger − Weapons; Nia DaCosta − 28 Years Later: The Bone Temple; Bryan Fuller − Dust Bunny; Maggie Gyllenhaal − The Bride!	Backrooms − Directed by Kane Parsons; Buffet Infinity − Directed by Simon Glassman; Dust Bunny − Directed by Bryan Fuller; Iron Lung − Directed by Markiplier; Queens of the Dead − Directed by Tina Romero
Best Lead Performance	Best Supporting Performance
Inde Navarrette − Obsession as Nikki Freeman; Zazie Beetz − They Will Kill You as Asia Reaves; Jessie Buckley − The Bride! as Ida / The Bride / Mary Shelley; Peter Dinklage − The Toxic Avenger as Winston Gooze / the Toxic Avenger / Toxie; Chiwetel Ejiofor − Backrooms as Clark; Ralph Fiennes − 28 Years Later: The Bone Temple as Dr Ian Kelson; Rachel McAdams − Send Help as Linda Liddle; Toby Poser − Mother of Flies as Solveig; Adam Scott − Hokum as Ohm Bauman; Sophie Sloan − Dust Bunny as Aurora	Amy Madigan − Weapons as Aunt Gladys; Stacy Clausen − Leviticus as Ryan Whelan; Jacob Elordi − Frankenstein as The Creature; Elle Fanning − Predator: Badlands as Thia / Tessa; Regina Hall − Scary Movie as Brenda Meeks; David Jonsson − The Long Walk as Peter "Pete" McVries (#23); Mads Mikkelsen − Dust Bunny as Resident 5B; Dacre Montgomery − Faces of Death as Arthur Spevak; Jack O'Connell − 28 Years Later: The Bone Temple as Sir Lord Jimmy Crystal; Sigourney Weaver − Dust Bunny as Laverne
Best Screenplay	Best Score
Obsession − Curry Barker; 28 Years Later: The Bone Temple − Alex Garland; Faces of Death − Isa Mazzei and Daniel Goldhaber; Hokum − Damian McCarthy; Weapons − Zach Cregger	Backrooms − Kane Parsons and Edo Van Breemen; 28 Years Later: The Bone Temple − Hildur Guðnadóttir; Faces of Death − Gavin Brivik; Frankenstein − Alexandre Desplat; Mother Mary − Daniel Hart
Best Make-Up FX	Best Creature FX
Frankenstein − Mike Hill; 28 Years Later: The Bone Temple − John Nolan; Lee Cronin's The Mummy − Arjen Tuiten; The Bride! − Chris Gallaher, Nadia Stacey and Scott Stoddard; The Toxic Avenger − Millennium FX	Five Nights at Freddy's 2 − Jim Henson's Creature Shop; Backrooms − Werner Pretorius and Amazing Ape Productions; Dust Bunny − Legacy Effects; Predator: Badlands − Studio Gillis and Wētā Workshop; Primate − Millennium FX
Best Costume Design	Best Cinematography
Frankenstein − Kate Hawley; 28 Years Later: The Bone Temple − Carson McColl and Gareth Pugh; Dust Bunny − Olivier Bériot and Catherine Leterrier; Queens of the Dead − David Tabbert; The Bride! − Sandy Powell	Backrooms − Jeremy Cox; 28 Years Later: The Bone Temple − Sean Bobbitt; Dust Bunny − Nicole Hirsch Whitaker; Hokum − Colm Hogan; Mother Mary − Andrew Droz Palermo and Rina Yang
Best Documentary Feature	Best Video Game
In Search of Darkness: 1995-1999 − Directed by David A. Weiner; 1000 Women in Horror − Directed by Donna Davies; Chain Reactions − Directed by Alexandre O. Philippe; The Last Sacrifice − Directed by Rupert Russell; Strange Journey: The Story of Rocky Horror − Directed by Linus O'Brien	Resident Evil Requiem − Capcom; Fatal Frame II: Crimson Butterfly Remake − Team Ninja; Little Nightmares III − Supermassive Games; No, I'm Not a Human − Trioskaz; Silent Hill f − NeoBards Entertainment
Best Series	Best Non-Fiction Series or Miniseries
Widow's Bay (Apple TV); Alien: Earth (FX); The Creep Tapes (Shudder); Something Very Bad Is Going to Happen (Netflix); The Vampire Lestat (AMC)	The Last Drive-in with Joe Bob Briggs (Shudder); The Boulet Brothers' Dragula: Titans (Shudder); Grave Conversations (YouTube); Monstrum (YouTube); Svengoolie (MeTV)
Best Kill	Chainsaw Award for Goodest Boy
The Brick Kill – Obsession	Indy – Good Boy
Editorial Eye on the Future Award
Joe Bird − Leviticus; James A. Janisse and Chelsea Rebecca − Dead Meat

== Presenters ==
- Tracie Thoms — presented Best Supporting Performance
- Glenn McQuaid — introduced Chris Colfer
- Chris Colfer — presented Best First Feature
- Sarah Lind and Isa Mazzei — presented Best Non-Fiction Series or Miniseries
- Emily Zarka and Vander Von Odd — presented Best Documentary Feature
- Kelli Maroney and Spencer Williams — presented Best Costume Design
- John Kassir — presented Best Creature FX
- Darren Stein and Peaches Christ — presented Best Make-Up FX
- Alanah Pearce — presented Best Video Game
- BJ Colangelo and Harmony Colangelo — presented Rules and Regulations
- Dylan Clark — presented Best Cinematography
- Cerina Vincent and Curtis RX — presented Best Score
- Julia Marchese and Teri Gamble — presented Best Series
- Katie Hettenbach and Kyra Gardner — introduced Phil Nobile Jr. and James A. Janisse
- Phil Nobile Jr. and James A. Janisse — presented Editorial Eye on the Future Award
- Dee Wallace — presented Chainsaw Award for Goodest Boy
- Jimmy Shaw — introduced Stephen Graham Jones
- Stephen Graham Jones — presented Best Screenplay
- Aurora Perrineau — presented Best International Movie
- Krsy Fox and Big Baby — presented Best Limited Release
- Kimberly Leszak — introduced Patrick Brice
- Patrick Brice — presented Best Streaming Premiere
- Tiffany Shepis and Felissa Rose — presented Best Kill
- Mink Stole — presented Best Lead Performance
- Mick Garris and William Malone — presented Best Director
- Lin Shaye — presented Best Wide Release
