= Faces of Death (2026 film) =

Film by Daniel Goldhaber

- Theatrical release poster
- Directed by: Daniel Goldhaber
- Written by: Isa Mazzei; Daniel Goldhaber
- Based on: Faces of Death by Gorgon Video (Note: Original 1978 film written and directed by John Allen Schwartz.)
- Produced by: Don Murphy; Susan Montford; Greg Gilreath; Adam Hendricks
- Starring: Barbie Ferreira; Dacre Montgomery; Josie Totah; Aaron Holliday; Jermaine Fowler; Charli XCX
- Cinematography: Isaac Bauman
- Edited by: Taylor Levy
- Music by: Gavin Brivik
- Production companies: Legendary Pictures; Angry Films
- Distributed by: Independent Film Company
- Release dates: April 5, 2026 (Beyond Fest); April 10, 2026 (United States)
- Running time: 97 minutes
- Country: United States
- Language: English
- Budget: $7.4 million
- Box office: $2.6 million

Faces of Death is a 2026 American horror film and reimagining of the 1978 film. Directed by Daniel Goldhaber and co-written with Isa Mazzei, it stars Barbie Ferreira, Dacre Montgomery, Josie Totah, Aaron Holliday, Jermaine Fowler, and Charli XCX. Filming was completed in May 2023.

The film premiered at the Beyond Fest Chicago as a 35mm screening on April 5, 2026. It was released in theaters by Independent Film Company on April 10, 2026.

== Plot ==
Margot Romero is a content moderator for Kino, a TikTok-like video platform. She is responsible for filtering out contents deemed offensive or violent. During her shift, she comes across an eerily real video depicting a decapitation execution. Initially disregarding the video as staged, she grows more concerned by another video depicting death via electric chair. Margot's request for second opinions is dismissed, seemingly caused by her past involvement in a trend that resulted in her sister's gruesome death. At home, Margot's roommate Ryan gives her a lipstick knife.

Arthur Spevak, a telecom store employee and the killer behind these videos, injects influencer Samantha Gravinsky with fentanyl and kidnaps her. Another graphic video involving a gruesome scalping alarms Margot, whose concern is shut down once more. She posts the videos on Reddit asking members whether the murders are real. The videos quickly skyrocket in popularity. Meanwhile, Arthur kidnaps a local news anchor and his teenage son, then kills the news anchor in a shoot-out setup.

On Reddit, Margot discovers the original Faces of Death film and notices similarities to the murder videos posted on Kino. Ryan explains the film's purported infamy as a "real" array of snuff deaths, yet reveals that it was all fake, which may coincide with the modern renditions being uploaded. Wanting clear proofs, Margot offers to cover the shift for her superior Josh, and uses his computer to copy the uploaded videos. She finds the uploader's metadata and uploads it to Reddit. Arthur replies to Margot's post with a malicious link and acquires her home's IP address.

The next day, Margot is fired by Kino for leaving a bag of stimulants on Josh's desk. Later, Arthur breaks into her apartment, kills Ryan, then drugs and kidnaps Margot.

Margot awakes in a caged basement and frees herself with the lipstick knife. She saves Samantha, who urges her to leave, but Margot stays behind to steal Arthur's hard drive for the original footage, which shows him unmasked. Samantha breaks free but is shot by Arthur with a scoped rifle. Margot flees into the woods and returns with a police escort in hopes of saving Samantha, but Arthur manipulates them into believing she trespassed on his property, and she is detained.

At a hospital, Margot receives Narcan and is sent a text demanding she return with the drive or Samantha and the other boy will be murdered.

At his place, Arthur holds Margot at gunpoint, explaining the world's desensitization to violence alongside the attentive desire for remade content in a newer age, which spurred his murder spree. In the garage, Arthur reveals the severed heads of the two victims strewn atop mannequins and orders Margot to inject herself with fentanyl. Shortly afterwards, Margot repeatedly stabs Arthur with her lipstick knife, and a lengthy, bloody scuffle ensues between the two. Margot survives, having recorded the entire confrontation on a hidden body camera. Arthur watches the last lines of Faces of Death as he bleeds out. On his computer, Margot uploads the footage to Kino and laughs in celebratory victory as it passes through the site's moderation, though finds herself disturbed that the comments on the video are callous and glib, not taking the situation seriously.

== Cast ==
- Barbie Ferreira as Margot Romero, a content moderator for Kino
- Dacre Montgomery as Arthur Spevak, a serial killer recreating deaths from the original Faces of Death
- Josie Totah as Samantha Gravinsky, an influencer and one of Arthur's victims
- Aaron Holliday as Ryan, Margot's roommate
- Jermaine Fowler as Josh, Margot's boss
- Charli XCX as Gabby, one of Margot's co-workers
- Kurt Yue as Neal, a local news anchor and one of Arthur's victims
- Isa Mazzei as a woman talking about Narcan on a Kino video

== Production ==
In October 2006, Rogue Pictures was in talks to produce a remake of the 1978 horror film Faces of Death with J. T. Petty attached to direct with producers citing a desire to tap into audiences' appetites for gory horror films citing the success of The Grudge and The Texas Chainsaw Massacre. The rights were reported in May 2021 to have been acquired by Legendary Entertainment. The writing team Daniel Goldhaber and Isa Mazzei were hired, with Goldhaber set as director. Susan Montford and Don Murphy produced under Angry Films, while Adam Hendricks and Greg Gilreath under their Divide/Conquer banner.

In April and May 2023, Barbie Ferreira, Dacre Montgomery, Josie Totah, Charli XCX and Jermaine Fowler were announced as the lead cast. Montgomery based his character on that of Adrian Țofei in the Romanian found footage horror film Be My Cat: A Film for Anne (2015).

On a production budget of $7.4 million (before tax incentives), principal photography began in New Orleans on April 10, 2023, under the working title Home Movies, and wrapped on May 12, 2023. While principal shooting was completed in 2023, pick-up shots were finished in March 2024.

== Release ==
North American distribution rights to the film were acquired by Independent Film Company and Shudder, with a release date set for April 10, 2026. The film marks IFC's widest release to date. The film premiered at the Beyond Fest Chicago as a 35mm screening on April 5, 2026. It also screened at the Aero Theatre in Los Angeles on April 7, and at the 2026 Overlook Film Festival on April 9.

== Reception ==
=== Box office ===
Faces of Death opened in 1,678 theaters, earning $892,000 from preview screenings and Friday ticket sales, and was projected to gross $1.8 million over its opening weekend.

=== Critical reviews ===
On the review aggregator website Rotten Tomatoes, 69% of 119 critics' reviews are positive, with an average rating of 6.3/10. The website's consensus reads: "A fiercely transgressive, self-aware reimagining that occasionally gives way to conventional genre exploitation, Faces of Death interrogates the morbid spectacle of violence with striking brutality and intelligence." Metacritic, which uses a weighted average, assigned the film a score of 63 out of 100, based on 22 critics, indicating "generally favorable" reviews. Audiences polled by CinemaScore gave the film an average grade of "C" on an A+ to F scale.
