= Faces of Death =

1978 film by John Alan Schwartz

- Theatrical release poster
- Directed by: John Alan Schwartz
- Written by: John Alan Schwartz
- Produced by: John Burrud; William B. James; Herbie Lee; Rosilyn T. Scott
- Starring: Michael Carr
- Cinematography: Michael Golden
- Edited by: James Roy
- Music by: Gene Kauer Sloter
- Production company: F.O.D. Productions
- Distributed by: Aquarius Releasing
- Release date: November 10, 1978 (United States)
- Running time: 105 minutes
- Country: United States
- Language: English
- Budget: $450,000
- Box office: $35 million

Faces of Death (later re-released as The Original Faces of Death) is a 1978 American mondo horror film written and directed by John Alan Schwartz, credited under the pseudonyms "Conan Le Cilaire" and "Alan Black" respectively.

The film centers on fictional pathologist Francis B. Gröss, played by actor Michael Carr, who presents the viewer with footage from a variety of sources showing different gruesome ways of dying. Many scenes were faked for the film, but most portions include pre-existing video footage of real deaths and their aftermath.

Faces of Death received generally negative reviews from critics but was a success at the box office, reportedly grossing over $35 million worldwide. It gained a cult following and spawned several sequels, the first of which, Faces of Death II, was released in 1981.

== Plot ==
After performing an autopsy, pathologist Francis B. Gröss tells the viewer that he is interested in the transitional periods of life and death thanks to a recurring dream. At the same time, his experience as a pathologist has desensitized him to grotesque deaths. He has compiled footage to understand the many "faces of death."

Footage is played of various deaths, including a man killed by an alligator, which Gröss calls a "violent retaliation from a creature who has suffered continued abuse from mankind". Gröss next narrates over recordings of assassinations, stating that humans are the only species to kill for greed. Assassin François Jordan is interviewed and admits that he kills solely for payment, not for political or social value. If there were a case on which he had thoughts, he would immediately, but respectfully, decline the mission. Gröss introduces another type of killer, "the one who kills for no apparent reason." A gunfight ensues between a SWAT team and an armed murderer. During the gunfight, the SWAT team throws tear gas into the house of the murderer, who is later shot, after which the team enters the killer's house to find his family stabbed to death; Gröss questions whether the man's actions were caused by society. As criminal Larry DeSilva is executed by electric chair, Gröss questions "if two wrongs make a right."

Gröss visits the Los Angeles County coroner's office, where Dr. Thomas Noguchi is embalming multiple corpses after their autopsies. One cadaver is a horrifically bloated drowned woman; the other is a decapitated man whose skin is peeled off his skull for examination. Gröss asks Noguchi for his thoughts on his own embalming process after he dies, to which he replies: "life is purely a transitory state."

One man, Samuel Berkowitz, has his body subjected to cryopreservation after death; his bodily fluids are replaced with a liquid with a low freezing point, then he is stored in a freezer to preserve his body for future science to revive him. The "theater of preservation" transitions to a brief discussion on suicide with footage of a woman jumping from a building; Gröss admits this was "a face of death he wishes never to face again."

The next segment displays war and atrocities in history, including the Holocaust. Footage of German forces slaughtering enemy forces is shown, as they were becoming more desperate in the latter years of the war. The segment ends with footage of Nazis being obliterated in battle and symbols of Nazism destroyed, with Gröss saying that Hitler "lost control not only of his army but of his mind."

Footage of animals dying due to litter and pollution is shown, followed by sick children in impoverished villages. Nature is examined with footage of a search party finding a body in a cave, a drowned man recovered at a beach, and footage of a bear mauling irresponsible campers. More of the "horrific nature of man" is examined with footage of a venomous snake cult in Louisville, Kentucky, killing a handler and a cannibalistic cult eating a cadaver stolen from a morgue before partaking in an orgy.

Footage of several more tragic accidents is shown, culminating in a scene of a person attempting a parachute jump but dying after the parachute fails to open correctly. Gröss disputes the notion that this death was quick and painless, as he would have been conscious and aware of the entire fall to the ground. The segment ends with a section on PSA Flight 182 and its grisly aftermath, featuring photographs of the accident, excerpts of audio from air traffic control, and footage of scattered body parts and destroyed houses at the crash site in San Diego. Numerous witnesses are seen, including horrified people from the neighborhood and disgusted first responders. Gröss states the neighborhood smells like "rotting bodies and jet fuel" and that a mutilated body with only its torso and right hand "is the worst face of death."

Gröss introduces his next topic, the role of supernatural forces in death. He meets with architect Joseph Binder, whose wife and son both died under tragic circumstances. Binder confides to the viewer that he believes his family remains as ghosts in his house, attempting to communicate with him. To verify this, Gröss enlists the services of parapsychologists. The team takes photographs of footprints and two apparitions. Binder communicates with his family's spirits through a medium, seemingly confirming the existence of life after death.

After studying Binder's case, Gröss concludes that "when we die, it isn't the end" as "the soul in each of us remains a traveler forever." Gröss questions whether death is "the end of the beginning or the beginning of the end" and leaves the footage he has shown to the viewer's interpretation. The film ends with peaceful music, footage of a baby's birth, and photos of the child and its mother being together and happy.

== Cast ==
- Michael Carr as Francis B. Gröss
- Samuel Berkowitz as Victim (uncredited)
- Mary Ellen Brighton as Suicide Victim (uncredited)
- Thomas Noguchi as Chief Medical Examiner Coroner (uncredited)
- John Alan Schwartz as Cult Leader (uncredited)
- Vern Stierman as Narrator (uncredited)

== Production ==
The film was written and directed by John Alan Schwartz (credited as "Alan Black" for writing and as "Conan Le Cilaire" for directing). Schwartz also took credit as second unit director, this time as "Johnny Getyerkokov". He also appears in one of the film's segments as the leader of the alleged flesh-eating cult in San Francisco, and has brief appearances in several other movies in this series. Schwartz wanted to depict very real death with "an analytical view, rather than a purely exploitive purpose", but the film's inclusion of fake scenes makes this debatable. The movie features Michael Carr as the narrator, and 'creative consultant' called "Dr. Francis B. Gröss", whose voice is reminiscent of Leonard Nimoy in the popular TV show In Search of... (which Schwartz worked on). Schwartz states that the movie's budget was $450,000, and there are estimates that it has grossed more than $35 million worldwide in theatrical releases, not including rentals.

Approximately 60% of the film was real footage purchased from news stations, medical researchers, witnesses to the Flight 182 crash, graphic war footage, graphic autopsies, deleted footage from other documentaries, and/or footage filmed by the actual crew in morgues or on a beach.

Many sequences in the film were recreations of news footage; special effects artist Douglas White stated the producers watched hundreds of hours of news footage and studied crime scene photos to determine whether their effects looked realistic. Editor Glenn Turner stated the initial version of the movie consisted of gruesome newsreel footage bought and compiled, but the lack of narrative made it "difficult to watch", leading to the decision to recreate some of the footage instead.

With the exception of the slaughterhouse sequence (which uses methods of killing that are long outdated), chicken beheading and African tribe butchering a cow, several scenes of animals were inauthentic: a seal clubbing which featured choreographed clubbing to avoid harming the seals, and a "violent dog fight" that was simply two dogs covered in theater blood playing with dramatic editing and music, whilst a scene showing a monkey being "killed and having its brains eaten" used cauliflower and theater blood for "brains".

The electric chair execution was achieved by building a fake chair, using toothpaste to emulate saliva, and adding electricity sounds in post-production. Schwartz was inspired to make the scene after reading about electric execution in the southern USA, and was surprised to find it still in practice. He wanted to find a way to film a real chair execution, but none were available during production.

The only "real, unscripted" part of the film features the body of a dead surfer who had washed up on shore as filmmakers were filming B-roll of litter for the pollution sequence nearby, and beachgoers started a commotion.

White and Allen Apone's newly formed special effects company had been given no details about the film upon being hired; they conceived the police shootout, the alligator attack, the monkey-brain dinner, the decapitation sequence, and the cannibalistic cult scene, with Schwartz himself playing the leader.

The morgue, suicide jumper, parachute jumper, snake cult, war, and Holocaust footage, and some of the vehicular accidents were authentic. The snake cult footage was later used in Michael Bolton's music video "Everybody's Crazy", without the handler dying of a snake bite. The WWII footage was also used, with the exception of the Holocaust and graphic battle footage. In their book Killing for Culture, authors David Kerekes and David Slater note that the nadir of the movie is the inclusion of an extreme fatal accident; "the shattered remains of a cyclist are seen under a semi-tractor trailer. The camera pans long enough to capture paramedics scooping up blood clots, brain matter, and clumps of hair from the tarmac; this incident is authentic and culled from newsreels." The train derailment footage was authentic, but the grisly aftermath was faked.

The PSA Flight 182 crash happened less than 2 months before the film's release, and graphic footage depicting the crash aftermath, destroyed houses, and scattered body parts were included in the film near the climax. Still images and air traffic audio were used to simulate the crash itself, because no actual footage is known to exist. According to Schwartz, the film was largely completed but reworked immediately after the crash.

One sequence involves cryogenic patient Samuel Berkowitz, who was frozen in July 1978 and stored in Northern California. The relatives who were funding the suspension began to lose interest and wherewithal, and an offer was made to continue the suspension as a neuro (head-only) free of charge, but was turned down. Instead, in October 1983, they had Berkowitz thawed, submerged in formaldehyde, given a proper funeral, and buried. No attempt was made to preserve the brain.

== Censorship ==
Due to its graphic content, Faces of Death was banned and censored in many countries. The movie is often billed as "Banned in 46 Countries", but this claim was exaggerated for marketing purposes. In the United Kingdom, the film was prosecuted and added to the "video nasty" list, as it was deemed to violate the Obscene Publications Act 1959. In 2003, the film was allowed to be released on DVD in the UK; however, cuts of 2 minutes and 19 seconds were required by the BBFC to remove scenes of "fighting dogs and [a] monkey being cruelly beaten to death in accordance with Cinematograph Films (Animals) Act 1937 and BBFC Guidelines." In 1980, Faces of Death was refused classification by the ACB. Despite the ban, several bootleg VHS tapes were released in the country, and the film was unbanned and released uncut on DVD in 2007. However, its sequels remain banned in the country. The film was also banned in New Zealand in 1989. In Germany, the film was edited for a VHS release, with the removal of some graphic scenes. The ban in Germany was lifted in 2022.

== Reception ==
The film was received relatively poorly by critics, both retrospective and contemporary. Review aggregator website Rotten Tomatoes reports that Faces of Death received a 23% critical approval rating of 13 surveyed critics. Writing for the Kansas City Kansan, reviewer Steve Crum denounced the film as "crude, tasteless exploitation footage. Filmed carnage." He ended his review urging the viewer to "be ashamed to watch this garbage."

Joshua Siebalt of Dread Central had mixed feelings about the film: "as a curiosity piece, Faces of Death is well worth a look, especially if you've not seen it in a very long time. As for its place in horror cinema history, well, that remains to be seen. As I said it's not a film that holds up very well at all, but considering how groundbreaking it was for its time, I doubt anyone will ever forget it. And while it is nice to have all of the myths about Faces finally addressed by the people who created it, it also takes some of the fun out if it, too."

Christopher Kulik of DVD Verdict wrote, "The YouTube generation will be unable to comprehend what purpose the film served thirty years ago, and thus it's difficult to ignore how hopelessly dated Faces of Death really is. In short, it's a cinematic experiment which has long outlived its effects, although it remains compelling for film and horror buffs viewing the film in the proper perspective. For the curious virgins, I say give it a shot only if you can handle what has been described up until this point; if you can get through Faces of Death, then you can get through just about anything. Feel free to judge for yourself."

In his review, Screen Anarchy's Ard Vijn was dismissive of the film, remarking that "many of the segments have lost their ability to shock, or can easily be recognized as fake by today's more media-savvy audience. Interesting as a curious bit of film history, but nothing more."

It was ranked #50 on Entertainment Weekly's "Top 50 Cult Films of All Time" in 2003.

== Legacy ==
=== Sequels ===
A number of straight to video sequels were made. Some contained almost exclusively authentic footage, while some were almost exclusively staged. Faces of Death II, Faces of Death III - The Final Assault, The Worst of the Faces of Death, and Faces of Death IV, as well as Faces of Death: Fact or Fiction? (a documentary on the making of the series) were written and directed by John Alan Schwartz (as Conan Le Cilaire).

Originally released in theaters on November 10, 1978 by Aquarius Releasing, Faces of Death was released on VHS and Betamax in October 1983, although a heavily edited version (running at 73 minutes) was released in the United Kingdom by "Atlantis Video Productions LTD" in 1982, only to later get banned and placed on the "video nasty" list.

Originally released in theaters in late 1981 (May 1981 in Japan), Faces of Death II was later released on VHS and Betamax on May 22, 1985. It contained real footage of a dead body being pulled from under a pier, Guerrilla death squads in El Salvador, napalm bombings in Vietnam, Buddhist self-immolations, the drugging of a monkey, a dolphin slaughter, a train disaster in India, Cambodian patients with leprosy, a death museum featuring Joaquin Murrieta's preserved head, a driver high on PCP and boxer Johnny Owen going down for his "final" count. The gas station robbery is the only scene outside of the narration to have been faked. Much like the PSA Aircraft crash, the assassination attempt on US President Ronald Reagan occurred recently before the film's completion, and was included as well.

Faces of Death III was released on VHS in mid-August 1986, with the earliest known date being August 20 (March 10, 1985 in Japan). It was originally planned to be released on November 1, 1985, but was withheld from purchase due to concerns of its content, and protests from a number of animal rights groups, in which resulted in "National Video Inc." banning the first two movies from over 550 video rental stores. It featured real footage of the German Autobahn, drug smugglers getting killed away by the Coast Guard, a parachutist landing in a crocodile pit, a videotaped rape/murder (the killer being played by Schwartz), and a car thief getting ripped apart by two junkyard dogs.

The Worst of the Faces of Death was released on VHS in the Fall of 1991 as a 60-minute compilation film featuring the "worst" of the previous three movies, which included some new footage as well. It was originally planned to be released on February 28, 1990, but would be delayed for unknown reasons. This compilation film was likely produced because of both the delay of Faces of Death IV, and because the original trilogy was briefly discontinued in 1987 by "MPI Home video" due to controversy surrounding the franchise until it was rereleased in the early 1990s by its spin-off company, "Gorgon Video".

Originally released in America as a midnight showing as early as August 29, 1991, Faces of Death IV was later released on VHS around late 1991 (November 28, 1990 in Germany). The film was originally produced in 1985, and was planned to be released in the Summer of 1987, but it would be delayed due to similar concerns that Faces of Death III had previously faced with their content, resulting in the previous movies being temporary discontinued from circulation. According to the copyright, the film was planned to be released in 1990, but was again delayed. The ending of the film features footage of the Symphony Orchestra Stage Collapse in Rio de Janeiro, Brazil. The narrator claims that it resulted in many deaths, where various shots of injured musicians, corpses and ripped limbs were shown over the end credits. However, when the footage was shown on other TV shows, such as Maximum Exposure and Stupid Behavior: Caught on Tape, it clarified that while 43 people were left injured, no one was killed by the collapse. Since the film was delayed for a few years due to the controversy, it was able to include the aforementioned stage collapse footage from March 1988.

Faces of Death: Fact or Fiction was released on VHS and DVD on September 28, 1999. Unlike the previous entries in the series, this film goes into debunking some of the well known scenes in the franchise, such as "the leg amputation scenes and the infamous eating live-monkey-brains sequence...", explaining how the reenacted scenes were produced to look realistic. While the VHS release also included a "Faces of Death" music and "Scenes From the Underground" (a compilation short of shocking, explicit footage from the Gorgon Video vaults), the DVD release also included the VHS bonuses, and the entire first Faces of Death film.

The franchise would have various Friday/Saturday midnight showings throughout the 1990s, with the earliest known date being late-August 1991, and the last known showing being October 16, 1999.

=== Additional "sequels" ===
Faces of Death V and Faces of Death VI were released in the mid-90s, and are compilations made up entirely of highlights from the first four movies (V also took much of its footage from Nick Bougas's 1989 film Death Scenes), with no new footage, intentionally released in countries where the original movies were banned. The first three featured Carr as "Dr. Gröss", although The Worst of Faces of Death (released between installments III and IV and consisting of highlights from the first three installments) instead featured Schwartz's brother, James Schwartz, as "Dr. Louis Flellis". Flellis explains that he accidentally killed "Dr. Gröss" while operating on him the prior week. However, in Faces of Death IV, Flellis explains the absence of Dr. Gröss by stating that he had killed himself, having been driven insane as a result of witnessing so much death.

Also released was Faces of Death VII, simply a retitled version of Death Scenes, and another assemblage of stock footage titled Faces of Death part 7 was released as an online file sometime during the late 1990s. Faces of Death 8 followed soon after. Released only in Germany, and made by unknown individuals, it is a collection of mostly unrelated gore scenes from around the world, with no narration, and no on-screen credits, aside from its title.

=== Reboot ===
In May 2021, it was reported that Legendary Entertainment had purchased the rights to the film, and a remake was in development, with filmmakers Isa Mazzei and Daniel Goldhaber attached to direct. The film stars Barbie Ferreira and Dacre Montgomery. Josie Totah was later announced to have joined the cast with Ferreira and Montgomery, with filming starting April 2023. Singer Charli XCX also joined the cast in a small role. The reboot is a narrative film, surrounding an online moderator finding obscene content.

== Legal cases ==
In June 1985, mathematics teacher Bart Schwarz showed the film to his class at Escondido High School in Escondido, California. Two of his students, Diane Feese and Sherry Forget, claimed they were so traumatized by the film that they both "developed an unnatural fear of dying and suffered emotional distress." The families of the two girls sued the school district and received a combined $100,000 settlement ($57,500 for Feese and $42,500 for Forget). Schwarz was suspended from the school for 15 days without pay, but was not fired.

In November 1986, 14-year-old Rod Matthews of Canton, Massachusetts bludgeoned his Canton High School classmate Shaun Ouillette to death with a baseball bat. Matthews claimed the idea to kill Ouillette was conceived after he viewed Faces of Death, as he was curious about what it would be like to kill someone. He had shown previous signs of mental illness. Matthews was sentenced to life in prison, with parole eligibility after 15 years. In November 2024, he was granted parole on his fifth appeal.

== Home media ==
Faces of Death and its sequels were released in boxset form on DVD by MPI Home Video in July 2002. Australian distributor Umbrella Entertainment released the film on DVD in 2007. In 2008, Gorgon Video released the movie on DVD and Blu-ray for its 30th anniversary. A brand new high definition transfer was made with new material and a 5.1 digital soundtrack. The company still offers VHS editions of the film, with the 1980s and 1990s box art. Due to its graphic content and legal difficulties, the film has never been broadcast on television, but is available to stream on Tubi and at one point on Shudder. In 2026, the video company Vinegar Syndrome began releasing restored versions of the films in 4K resolution on their sublabel Vinegar Syndrome Archive. To date they have released Faces of Death, Faces of Death II, Faces of Death III (aka Fear), and Faces of Death IV.

== See also ==
- Traces of Death
- Snuff film
