= Fresh Meat =

Fresh Meat may refer to:

== Film and television ==
- Fresh Meat (TV series), a British comedy-drama
- Fresh Meat (2012 film), a New Zealand horror comedy film
- Fresh Meat (2026 film), an American independent horror anthology film

== Other uses ==
- Fresh Meat (album), the debut album of Arkarna
- FreshMeat, the former name of the software website Freecode
- Fresh Meat (song), by Jeffree Star from the album Beauty Killer

== See also ==
- Meat, animal flesh used as food
