= In Search of the Last Action Heroes =

2019 documentary film about action films from the 1980s and 1990s

- Directed by: Oliver Harper
- Written by: Oliver Harper; Timon Singh
- Cinematography: Jim Kunz
- Edited by: Oliver Harper; Michael Peristeris
- Music by: Peter Bruce
- Production company: CreatorVC Studios
- Distributed by: Gravitas Ventures (United States); 101 Films (United Kingdom)
- Release date: 18 December 2019 (London)
- Running time: 140 minutes
- Country: United Kingdom
- Language: English

In Search of the Last Action Heroes is a 2019 documentary film written and directed by Oliver Harper, and co-written by Timon Singh. The film revisits the action films of the 1980s and 1990s, often regarded as the genre's Golden Age, via interviews with filmmakers and actors who were active during that time, or are viewed as their successors.

== Cast ==
- Scott Adkins
- Shane Black
- Stan Bush
- Ronny Cox
- Boaz Davidson
- Steven E. de Souza
- Brad Fiedel
- Sam Firstenberg
- Mark Goldblatt
- Jeffrey Greenstein
- Mario Kassar
- Mark L. Lester
- Sheldon Lettich
- Peter MacDonald
- Zak Penn
- Phillip Rhee
- Eric Roberts
- Cynthia Rothrock
- Brian Tyler
- Paul Verhoeven
- Graham Yost
- Vernon Wells
- Michael Jai White

David J. Moore, author of the book The Good, the Tough, and the Deadly: Action Movies and Stars, and Ian Nathan, Empire journalist and author of the book The Terminator Vault, also appear.

== Production ==
Director Harper worked in various capacities for British cinema chain Cineworld. Inspired by video retrospectives produced by gaming website Gametrailers, he started producing similar featurettes about classic action films, which he published on Blip and his own website Oliver Harper's Retrospectives and Reviews. Robin Block, a music documentarian looking to branch out into popular film history, came across Harper's series and offered to sponsor his work. The relationship evolved into a feature-length project. News of the documentary's production reached Timon Singh, an advertising creative and author of the book Born to Be Bad: Talking to the Greatest Villains in Action Cinema, who offered to collaborate on the venture and use the connections he had forged during the making of his book to arrange some of the film's interviews. Film journalist David A. Weiner, who would go on to direct his own documentaries for Block, served as a producer on the feature.

== Release ==
In Search of the Last Action Heroes premiered on 18 December 2019 at the Castle Cinema in London, United Kingdom. The film was released on DVD and Blu-ray Disc by American distributor Gravitas Ventures on 21 January 2020.

== Reception ==
Writing for Stuff, reviewer James Croot asserted that while "[p]erhaps not as in-depth, irreverent or stylish as Netflix’s The Movies That Made Us, or revelatory as the likes of Electric Boogaloo: The Wild, Untold Story of Cannon Films [...], In Search of the Last Action Heroes is still a thoroughly entertaining, inspiring watch."

== Follow-ups ==
In Search of the Last Action Heroes launched a series of similar pop culture documentaries, which also includes In Search of Darkness, a trilogy about horror films, and In Search of Tomorrow, a science-fiction film retrospective. Those were directed by Weiner.
Harper went on to direct Here Comes a New Challenger, which examines the craze surrounding the Street Fighter transmedia franchise. He also edited The Last Kumite, a throwback feature reuniting many familiar faces of 1980s martial arts cinema, including this film's interviewees Cynthia Rothrock and Stan Bush.
