= In Search of Darkness =

2019 documentary film about horror films from the 1980s

- Promotional release poster by Graham Humphreys
- Directed by: David A. Weiner
- Written by: David A. Weiner
- Produced by: David A. Weiner; Jessica Dwyer; Heather Wixson
- Starring: John Carpenter; Heather Langenkamp; Joe Dante; Jeffrey Combs; Barbara Crampton; Keith David; Greg Nicotero; Bill Moseley; Caroline Williams; Kane Hodder; Sean S. Cunningham; Tom Holland
- Edited by: Samuel Way
- Music by: Weary Pines
- Production company: CreatorVC Studios
- Release date: October 6, 2019 (Beyond Fest)
- Running time: 264 minutes
- Countries: United Kingdom; United States
- Language: English

In Search of Darkness is a 2019 documentary film written and directed by David A. Weiner and executive produced by Robin Block of CreatorVC Studios. An international co-production of the United Kingdom and the United States, the film explores the development and lasting impact of the horror film genre during the 1980s, and features interviews with numerous horror icons both from that decade and from the modern era, along with popular horror influencers.

In Search of Darkness premiered at the 2019 Beyond Fest.

== Cast ==
- Tom Atkins
- Doug Bradley
- Joe Bob Briggs
- Lori Cardille
- John Carpenter
- Nick Castle
- Larry Cohen
- Jeffrey Combs
- Barbara Crampton
- Sean S. Cunningham
- Joe Dante
- Keith David
- Katie Featherston
- Mick Garris
- Michael Gingold
- Stuart Gordon
- Andre Gower
- Gunship
- Spencer Hickman
- Kane Hodder
- Tom Holland
- Graham Humphreys
- Lloyd Kaufman
- Robert Kurtzman
- Heather Langenkamp
- Don Mancini
- Harry Manfredini
- Kelli Maroney
- Robbi Morgan
- Bill Moseley
- Greg Nicotero
- Phil Nobile Jr.
- Cassandra Peterson
- James Rolfe
- Ken Sagoes
- Ben Scrivens
- James A. Janisse
- Corey Taylor
- Cecil Trachenburg
- Ryan Turek
- Caroline Williams
- Alex Winter
- Heather Wixson
- Tom Woodruff Jr.
- Brian Yuzna

== Production ==
In Search of Darkness initially began as a crowdfunding campaign on Kickstarter in October 2018, and the project met its initial goal in two days. It went on to amass £99,478 in pledges from 1,532 backers on Kickstarter, before later moving platforms to Indiegogo in March 2019, where it has raised over £234,300. The film received an exclusive release in 2019 to backers of the project.

== Critical reception ==
On the review aggregator website Rotten Tomatoes, In Search of Darkness has an approval rating of 100%, based on 13 reviews, with an average rating of 8.3/10.

Josh Weiss of Forbes called the documentary "a scary good magnum opus" and recommended it for fans of horror fiction and for those interested in history, writing: "At times, you'll be lost in wonder at how this comprehensively epic behemoth was cut together in the first place. [...] This is a definitive, intimate, anecdotal, thematic, funny, and loving oral history of a decade that changed the face of big screen horror forever." Michelle Swope of Dread Central gave the film a score of 5 out of 5, writing that "even at about four hours long, it's never boring", and summarizing it as "an all-encompassing, delightfully spooky love letter to eighties horror."

Carolyn Mauricette of Rue Morgue wrote that "You might find the volume of information overwhelming at first because they come at you with a rapid-fire pace, but once you settle in, this documentary is a great ride." Noah Berlatsky of The Verge called the documentary "a compulsively watchable delight" and wrote that "even hardcore genre fans are bound to find something new they'd like to see or something old they want to revisit". Jessica Gomez of All Horror wrote: "It's well-researched, well-rounded, and filmed without bias. A masterpiece worthy of the most important decade of horror."

== Series ==
In Search of Darkness was the second installment of the In Search of documentary series, following In Search of the Last Action Heroes, which is dedicated to 1980s and 1990s action cinema.
It was followed by several further films: In Search of Tomorrow, which chronicles science fiction films of the 1980s, and In Search of Darkness: Part II, Part III, In Search of Darkness: 1990-1994, and In Search of Darkness: 1995-1999, which serve as a direct continuation of In Search of Darkness. In 2026, In Search of Darkness ’70s was announced, exploring horror movies of the 1970s.
