= Founders Day (film) =

2023 American slasher film by Erik Bloomquist

- Theatrical release poster
- Directed by: Erik Bloomquist
- Screenplay by: Erik Bloomquist; Carson Bloomquist
- Produced by: Erik Bloomquist; Carson Bloomquist; Adam Weppler
- Starring: Naomi Grace; Devin Druid; William Russ; Amy Hargreaves; Catherine Curtin; Emilia McCarthy
- Cinematography: Mike Magilnick
- Edited by: Erik Bloomquist; Carson Bloomquist
- Music by: Timothy Williams
- Production company: Mainframe Pictures
- Distributed by: Dark Sky Films
- Release dates: August 18, 2023 (Popcorn Frights Film Festival); January 19, 2024 (United States)
- Running time: 104 minutes
- Country: United States
- Language: English

Founders Day is a 2023 American slasher film directed by Erik Bloomquist. The screenplay was written by Bloomquist with his brother Carson Bloomquist and stars Naomi Grace, Devin Druid, William Russ, Amy Hargreaves, Catherine Curtin and Emilia McCarthy. The plot follows the lives of a group of citizens who are pursued and killed by a mysterious masked figure in the middle of a political campaign.

The film premiered at the Popcorn Frights Film Festival on August 18, 2023. It was given a limited theatrical release in the United States on January 19, 2024, by Dark Sky Films. Founders Day received mixed reviews from critics.

== Plot ==
In the small New England town of Fairwood, a heated political campaign is underway between two mayoral candidates on the town's 300th anniversary. In the middle of it all, the candidates' inner circle becomes the target of a masked serial killer in a judge's suit who begins to torment everyone in the city.

== Cast ==
- Naomi Grace as Allison Chambers
- Devin Druid as Adam Faulkner
- William Russ as Mr. Jackson
- Amy Hargreaves as Blair Gladwell
- Catherine Curtin as Commissioner Judith Peterson
- Emilia McCarthy as Lilly Gladwell
- Olivia Nikkanen as Melissa Faulkner
- Jayce Bartok as Harold Faulkner
- Andrew Stewart-Jones as Thomas Chambers
- Tyler James White as Rob Donahue
- Erik Bloomquist as Oliver Hull
- Adam Weppler as Deputy Finn Miller
- Kate Edmonds as Britt
- Dylan Slade as Tyler Allen
- Arun Storrs as Nancy Faulkner

== Production ==
The project was announced in November 2022, when Deadline Hollywood revealed that the Bloomquist brothers under the production of the Mainframe Pictures company had developed a film titled Founders Days. At the time, the film was described as a political mystery satire that addresses the bloody murders in a small town on the eve of the mayoral elections. Additional co-producers of the film include Amy Hargreaves and William Russ; also Mike Chapman, Fatima Hayward and William Kay of the company Blue Finch Films were announced as executive producers, which was also in charge of the international sales of the film for its screening.

The principal photography for the film began in September 2022 and concluded in New Milford, Connecticut, on November 22, 2022. Filming took place in the Town Green, the John Pettibone Community Center, Bank Street, Bank Street Theater and New Milford Town Hall. Additional, it was announced that the main cast of the film was made up of Devin Druid, Emilia McCarthy, Amy Hargreaves, Catherine Curtin, William Russ, Naomi Grace, Olivia Nikkanen and among others.

== Release ==
Founders Day premiered at Popcorn Frights Film Festival in Florida, on August 18, 2023. The film was released theatrically on January 19, 2024, by Dark Sky Films in the United States.

== Reception ==
=== Critical response ===
On the review aggregator website Rotten Tomatoes, 49% of 39 critics' reviews are positive, with an average rating of 5.2/10. The website's consensus reads: "Founders Day brings a few clever bits to bear on its '80s-inspired slasher story, but its scattershot tone and an overreliance on horror clichés prevent it from leaving much of an impression." On Metacritic, the film has a weighted average score of 39 out of 100, based on reviews from eight critics, indicating "generally unfavorable" reviews.

Dennis Harvey of Variety wrote: "Siblings Erik and Carson Bloomquist's latest has surface polish, but the intended mix of current-events satire and horror doesn't quite gel." Simon Abrams of RogerEbert.com gave the film 1.5/5 stars, writing: "A couple of pedal-to-the-floor melodramatic twists suggest that Founders Days might've been a bolder or just meaner genre movie, but its toothless satire, like its timid horror drama, sadly doesn't cut it." Writing for The A.V. Club, Matthew Jackson gave the film a positive review, saying that: "Founders Day is a slasher movie blast, a clever, brutal little movie that's capable of pleasing diehard horror fans and newcomers alike."

=== Accolades ===
Year	Award	Category	Nominee(s)	Result	Ref.
2023	Toronto After Dark Film Festival	Film Most Want to See a Sequel to	Founders Day	Won	
