= Dust Bunny =

2025 film by Bryan Fuller

- Theatrical release poster
- Directed by: Bryan Fuller
- Written by: Bryan Fuller
- Produced by: Basil Iwanyk; Erica Lee; Bryan Fuller
- Starring: Mads Mikkelsen; Sophie Sloan; Sheila Atim; David Dastmalchian; Sigourney Weaver
- Cinematography: Nicole Hirsch Whitaker
- Edited by: Lisa Lassek
- Music by: Isabella Summers
- Production companies: eOne Films; Thunder Road Pictures; Living Dead Guy Productions
- Distributed by: Lionsgate; Roadside Attractions
- Release dates: September 9, 2025 (TIFF); December 12, 2025 (United States)
- Running time: 106 minutes
- Country: United States
- Language: English
- Box office: $1.4 million

Dust Bunny is a 2025 American independent fantasy action film written, produced, and directed by Bryan Fuller in his feature film directorial debut. It stars Mads Mikkelsen, Sophie Sloan, Sheila Atim, David Dastmalchian, and Sigourney Weaver. It follows a hit man who is approached by an eight-year-old girl to kill the "monster" under her bed that she claims "ate" her family.

The film premiered at the 2025 Toronto International Film Festival on September 9, 2025, followed by a theatrical release in the United States on December 12.

== Plot ==
Eight-year-old Aurora lives in New York City with her parents. While she is lying on the fire escape at night, a firefly draws her attention to a neighbor in unit 5B. Intrigued, she follows him to Chinatown one night and witnesses him kill a dragon – actually an armed gang in a dragon dance puppet.

Aurora warns her parents to avoid stepping on her bedroom floor, as she says this will trigger the appearance of a monster under her bed. They attempt to soothe her while setting aside her concerns, but she remains convinced and says "Goodbye" to them. That night, hiding under her blanket, she hears them being attacked and wakes up alone, finding her parents' bedroom torn apart.

Aurora steals the offering plate from a local church and attempts to use the money to hire Resident 5B to kill the monster. He finds it more likely that her parents were mistakenly killed by assassins who were looking for him, and informs his handler Laverne, who advises him to kill the child since she witnessed the killing in Chinatown, but he opts to ignore this advice. That evening, two hitmen arrive in Aurora's apartment. 5B kills one following a hand-to-hand battle; the other disappears after shooting at Aurora's unoccupied bed. In the aftermath, Aurora and 5B narrowly avoid questioning from Brenda, the child protection agent assigned to Aurora; she reveals enough for 5B to understand that Aurora's birth parents and three sets of foster parents have all disappeared.

Aurora becomes more deeply immersed in 5B's world. They bring the dismembered body of the assassin he killed to Laverne, who reveals that she hired the two assassins to remove Aurora as a loose end, being a witness to 5B's activity. They also encounter an assassin who has a contract on 5B.

The assassin and his team follow them home and converge on Aurora's apartment. Brenda returns as well, revealing that she is an FBI agent (as 5B suspected). 5B, the hitmen, and the FBI engage in a fierce firefight that ends when the monster – a giant, vicious bunny that emerges from the floor – consumes everyone except Aurora.

In the morning, 5B emerges from the floor, presumably spat out by the monster due to having applied a thumb-sucking deterrent. Laverne arrives and 5B pleads with her to not kill Aurora and to get off the floor, revealing that she is his mother. The monster re-emerges and Laverne stands her ground shooting at it before it consumes her. The monster then moves at 5B but Aurora stands between them and tells the monster "No."

5B understands that the monster is hers and tells Aurora that she can control it. Together, they leave the city to start a new life together. As they drive between fields of sunflowers, their car's shadow on the road has the form of the monster running with them.

A mid-credits scene reveals that Brenda survived by hiding in the ironing cabinet.

== Cast ==
- Mads Mikkelsen as Resident 5B, a hitman
- Sophie Sloan as Aurora, a girl whose family was killed by a monster under the bed
- Sigourney Weaver as Laverne, the handler of Resident 5B
- Sheila Atim as Brenda
- David Dastmalchian as Conspicuously Inconspicuous Man
- Rebecca Henderson as an intimidating woman
- Line Kruse as Mother
- Caspar Phillipson as Father

== Production ==
In November 2022, it was reported that Bryan Fuller would produce and direct the "family horror film" Dust Bunny, from a script he wrote, with Mads Mikkelsen signed on in a lead role. In 2025, Fuller revealed the story was originally devised as an episode of the 2020 revival of Amazing Stories. In June 2023, Sigourney Weaver was reported to be in the cast. She told the New York Social Diary that she plays "another person who's not so nice, opposite Mikkelsen". In December 2023, it was announced that David Dastmalchian was in the film's cast.

Principal photography began in Budapest in June 2023. Since the production is not part of the Alliance of Motion Picture and Television Producers, it was granted an interim agreement to continue filming during the 2023 SAG-AFTRA strike.

Danish actress Line Kruse played the part of mother, as well as being an acting coach for Sophie Sloan.

The location scout for the film, Marci Bálint, chose the refurbished Hungarian Treasury Building as the centrepiece of the film. The Art Nouveau interior of the building with a staircase spiralling around an ornate elevator set the tone for the apartment building where the majority of the film takes place.

Production designer Jeremy Reed took inspiration from the varied architecture in Budapest and created ornate sets full of symbolism, like the wallpaper covering the hallways of Aurora’s apartment, one restaurant full of floral arrangements and another with a huge aquarium full of sharks. The team had considered filming in a European zoo, but they stated that the conditions for the animals were not sufficient for them to feel comfortable filming there.

== Release ==
Dust Bunny premiered at the 2025 Toronto International Film Festival in its Midnight Madness program on September 9, 2025 and had its U.S. premiere at American Cinematheque's Beyond Fest on September 30, 2025. It was released theatrically in the United States on December 12, 2025.

=== Box office ===
As of May 23, 2026, it grossed a total of $584,724 in the United States, and $791,987 in other territories, for a worldwide total of $1,376,711.

== Reception ==
=== Critical response ===
On the review aggregator website Rotten Tomatoes, 85% of 115 critics' reviews are positive, with an average rating of 7/10. The website's consensus reads: "Elevated by Mads Mikkelsen and Sophie Sloan's magnetic chemistry, Dust Bunny is a dazzingly imaginative and stylish feature debut from director Bryan Fuller." Metacritic, which uses a weighted average, assigned the film a score of 73 out of 100, based on 15 critics, indicating "generally favorable" reviews.

=== Accolades ===
| Award | Date of ceremony | Category | Recipient(s) | Result | Ref. |
|---|---|---|---|---|---|
| British Film Designers Guild Awards | February 28, 2026 | Best Production Design – Feature Film – Fantasy | Jeremy Reed, Adorjan Portik, Dorka Kiss, and Kata Kiss | Won | |
| Fangoria Chainsaw Awards | October 25, 2026 | Best Limited Release Movie | Dust Bunny | Won | |
| Fangoria Chainsaw Awards | October 25, 2026 | Best First Feature | Dust Bunny | Nominated | |
| Fangoria Chainsaw Awards | October 25, 2026 | Best Director | Bryan Fuller | Nominated | |
| Fangoria Chainsaw Awards | October 25, 2026 | Best Lead Performance | Sophie Sloan | Nominated | |
| Fangoria Chainsaw Awards | October 25, 2026 | Best Supporting Performance | Mads Mikkelsen | Nominated | |
| Fangoria Chainsaw Awards | October 25, 2026 | Best Supporting Performance | Sigourney Weaver | Nominated | |
| Fangoria Chainsaw Awards | October 25, 2026 | Best Cinematography | Nicole Hirsch Whitaker | Nominated | |
| Fangoria Chainsaw Awards | October 25, 2026 | Best Costume Design | Olivier Bériot and Catherine Leterrier | Nominated | |
| Fangoria Chainsaw Awards | October 25, 2026 | Best Creature FX | Legacy Effects | Nominated | |
| Film Independent Spirit Awards | February 15, 2026 | Best First Feature | Bryan Fuller, Basil Iwanyk, and Erica Lee | Nominated | |
| Film Independent Spirit Awards | February 15, 2026 | Best Cinematography | Nicole Hirsch Whitaker | Nominated | |
| Saturn Awards | March 8, 2026 | Best Independent Film | Dust Bunny | Won | |
| Saturn Awards | March 8, 2026 | Best Actor in a Film | Mads Mikkelsen | Nominated | |
| Saturn Awards | March 8, 2026 | Best Supporting Actress in a Film | Sigourney Weaver | Won | |
| Saturn Awards | March 8, 2026 | Best Younger Performer in a Film | Sophie Sloan | Nominated | |
| Saturn Awards | March 8, 2026 | Best Film Screenwriting | Bryan Fuller | Nominated | |
