= Twelve (TV series) =

2025 South Korean television series

- Promotional poster
- Hangul: 트웰브
- RR: Teuwelbeu
- MR: T'ŭwelbŭ
- Genre: Fantasy action; Superhero
- Written by: Kim Bong-han; Ma Dong-seok
- Directed by: Kang Dae-gyu; Han Yun-seon
- Starring: Ma Dong-seok; Park Hyung-sik; Seo In-guk; Sung Dong-il; Lee Joo-bin; Ko Kyu-pil; Kang Mi-na; Sung Yoo-bin; Ahn Ji-hye; Regina Lei
- Music by: Hwang Gwang-seon; Seo In-guk
- Opening theme: "Taesan" by Tiger JK
- Country of origin: South Korea
- Original language: Korean
- No. of episodes: 8

Production
- Executive producers: Gu Seong-mok; Ma Dong-seok; Choi Won-gi; Heo Jeong-uk
- Producers: Park Jeong-hoon; Park Mi-hyeon; Son Jeong-hyeon
- Cinematography: Chae Jeong-suk; Yoon Yeong-su
- Editor: Go Ah-mo
- Running time: 45 minutes
- Production companies: Contents G; Big Punch Pictures; Nova Film; Studio X+U; The Contents On; Monster Union
- Budget: ₩20 billion

Original release
- Network: KBS2
- Release: August 23 – September 14, 2025

Twelve (Korean: 트웰브) is a 2025 South Korean fantasy action superhero television series written by Kim Bong-han and Ma Dong-seok, directed by Kang Dae-gyu and Han Yun-seon, and starring Ma, Park Hyung-sik, Seo In-guk, Sung Dong-il, Lee Joo-bin, Ko Kyu-pil, Kang Mi-na, Sung Yoo-bin, Ahn Ji-hye, and Regina Lei. The drama revolves around the 12 angels and their struggles to protect the Korean Peninsula from evil spirits. It aired on KBS2 from August 23, to September 14, 2025, every Saturday and Sunday at 21:20 (KST). The drama is also available for streaming on U+ Mobile TV in South Korea and on Disney+ in select regions.

== Synopsis ==
Twelve heavenly beings led by Tae-san each represents one of the animals of the Eastern zodiac. Long ago, they sealed away a powerful demonic entity threatening the human world, resulting in the sacrifice of four of their own. The remaining eight angels, burdened by grief and guilt, withdrew from the mortal realm and vowed never to interfere again.

In the present day, the seal begins to weaken, and an ancient evil spirit named O-gwi resurfaces, intent on plunging the world into chaos. Wanting to prevent catastrophe, the zodiac angels must reunite and confront the growing threat.

== Cast and characters ==
- Ma Dong-seok as Tae-san

An angel symbolizing the tiger who protects the world with absolute power and is the leader of the 12 angels. He buries the four angels symbolizing the ox, rabbit, goat, and rooster who were sacrificed in a past battle deep in his heart, and lives in the human world while hiding his identity.

- Park Hyung-sik as O-gwi

An evil spirit who confronts the angels with merciless power.

- Seo In-guk as Won-seung

An angel symbolizing the monkey. He is a quick-witted and resourceful man who dreams of becoming the next leader after Tae-san.

- Sung Dong-il as Ma-rok

The only human with special abilities chosen by God and the manager of the 12 angels. He stays by the side of the angels and helps them protect the human world.

- Lee Joo-bin as Mirr

An angel symbolizing the dragon. She lives with her special powers sealed along with evil spirits in a battle thousands of years ago.

- Ko Kyu-pil as Don-yi

An angel symbolizing the pig who works as a nurse at a Korean medicine clinic to help Bang-wool by vocalizing her thoughts. He has an agile body movement when fighting and can read minds.

- Kang Mi-na as Kang-ji

An angel symbolizing the dog. She is as agile as a fighting dog when fighting and has a warm heart that never lets go of her desire to protect humans. She is able to locate demons.

- Sung Yoo-bin as Jwidol

An angel symbolizing the rat. He has a quick judgment that plays an indispensable role in the activities of the angels.

- Ahn Ji-hye as Mal-suk

An angel symbolizing the horse.

- Regina Lei as Bang-wool

An angel symbolizing the snake. She is a doctor of oriental medicine who treats all diseases of humans with medical techniques passed down from ancient times. She does not speak and relies on Don-yi to speak her thoughts.

== Production ==
=== Development ===
The series is directed by Kang Dae-gyu, whose works include the movie Harmony (2010) and Pawn (2020), with Han Yun-seon. It is written by Kim Bong-han and Ma Dong-seok. Contents, Big Punch Pictures, Nova Film, Monster Union, The Contents On, and Studio X+U managed the production with the latter also taking on the planning. The production cost was about ₩20 billion.

=== Casting ===
In 2023, Ma Dong-seok reportedly received the series' script and was reviewing it well. In 2024, Ji Chang-wook, Seo In-guk, Lee Joo-bin, Kang Mi-na, Sung Dong-il, and Ko Kyu-pil were reportedly cast and positively considering appearing. Ma, Seo, Sung, Ko, Lee – along with Park Hyung-sik, Ahn Jihye, Kang Mi-na, Sung Yoo-bin, and Regina Lei – officially confirmed their appearances in October.

=== Filming ===
Principal photography began at the end of October 2024.

== Release ==
Twelve premiered on KBS2 on August 23, 2025, and airs every Saturday and Sunday at 21:20 (KST). It is also available for streaming on U+ Mobile TV in South Korea and Disney+ in select regions.

== Viewership ==
Twelve : South Korea viewers per episode (millions)

Season	Episode number								Average
Season	1	2	3	4	5	6	7	8	Average
1	1.591	1.228	0.772	0.599	0.648	0.475	0.585	0.486	0.798

Source: Audience measurement performed nationwide by Nielsen Korea.

Average TV viewership ratings
Ep.	Original broadcast date	Average audience share (Nielsen Korea)	
Ep.	Original broadcast date	Nationwide	Seoul
1	August 23, 2025	8.1% (2nd)	7.2% (2nd)
2	August 24, 2025	5.9% (7th)	5.3% (8th)
3	August 30, 2025	4.2% (10th)	3.7% (13th)
4	August 31, 2025	3.1% (13th)	2.5% (16th)
5	September 6, 2025	3.4% (15th)	3.3% (14th)
6	September 7, 2025	2.6% (18th)	2.2% (20th)
7	September 13, 2025	3.0% (16th)	2.6% (19th)
8	September 14, 2025	2.4% (26th)	—
Average		4.1%	—
In the table above, the blue numbers represent the lowest ratings and the red numbers represent the highest ratings.
