= Demon Hunters (film) =

Indian Taiwanese comedy horror film

- Taiwan theatrical release poster
- Directed by: Chen Mei-Juin
- Screenplay by: Po-Jung Hua; Jun-You Wu
- Produced by: Yong Yu Huang; Chen-Shing Yeh
- Starring: Arjan Bajwa; JC Lin; Regina Lei; Jack Kao
- Cinematography: Tony Cheung
- Production companies: Lighthouse Productions; Kleos Entertainment Group
- Release date: 31 December 2025 (Taiwan)
- Countries: Taiwan; India
- Languages: Taiwanese Mandarin; Hindi; English; Cantonese

Demon Hunters is a 2025 action-horror-comedy film directed by Chen Mei-Juin and produced by Light House Productions (Taiwan) and Kleos Entertainment Group (India). The film stars Arjan Bajwa, JC Lin, Regina Lei and Jack Kao.

== Cast ==
- Arjan Bajwa as Sanjay
- JC Lin
- Regina Lei as Arumi
- Jack Kao
- Harry Chan

== Production ==
The film is produced by Lighthouse Productions (Taiwan) and Kleos Entertainment Group (India). The director is Chen Mei-Juin and director of photography is Hong Kong veteran Tony Cheung.

The cast includes Arjan Bajwa, JC Lin, Regina Lei and Jack Kao.

Filming took place in Taiwan in October 2023.

== Release ==
The film was featured at the 2024 Cannes Film Market ahead of a global release in the winter of 2024. The film will be released in Taiwan on December 31, 2025.
