= Devin Druid =

American actor (born 1998)

- Born: Devin McKenzie Druid; January 27, 1998 (age 28); Chesterfield, Virginia, U.S.
- Occupation: Actor
- Years active: 2012–present

Devin McKenzie Druid (born January 27, 1998) is an American actor. He is known for his portrayal of Tyler Down in the Netflix series 13 Reasons Why, based on the 2007 novel by Jay Asher.

== Filmography ==
=== Film ===
Year	Title	Role	Notes	Ref.
2012	Trading Ages	Lead boy	Documentary film	
2013	Troop 491: the Adventures of the Muddy Lions	Melvin		
2015	Louder Than Bombs	Conrad		
2016	Wiener-Dog	Dwight		
2016	MacBeth Unhinged	Boy Macduff		
2016	Sugar!	Danny		
2016	Imperium	Johnny		
2018	Cam	Jordan		
2020	Greyhound	Wallace		
2020	The Pale Door	Jake		
2020	White Elephant	Wayne		
2020	The Man in the Woods	E.W. Noyes		
2022	Curse of the Macbeths	Boy Macduff		
2023	Founders Day	Adam Faulkner		
2024	Puddysticks			
TBA	Crossed	Stan	Post-production	

=== Television ===
Year	Title	Role	Notes
2012	Fatal Encounters	Young Jesse Schwartz	Documentary; episode: "Fatal Fantasy"
2014	Those Who Kill	Young Nathan	Episode: "A Safe Place"
2014	Louie	Young Louie	2 episodes
2014	Olive Kitteridge	Christopher (age 13)	2 episodes
2016	House of Cards	Danny	1 episode
2017–20	13 Reasons Why	Tyler Down	Main role
2017	13 Reasons Why: Beyond the Reasons	Himself	Documentary
2018	9-1-1	Marjorie Daniel's son	Season 1, episode 9: "Trapped"
2026	Will Trent	Viitor Langley	Season 4, episode 8: "We're Looking for a Vampire"
2026–present	NCIS: New York	Sean Sullivan	Main role
