= Regina Lei =

Taiwanese actress (born 2000)

- 雷嘉汭
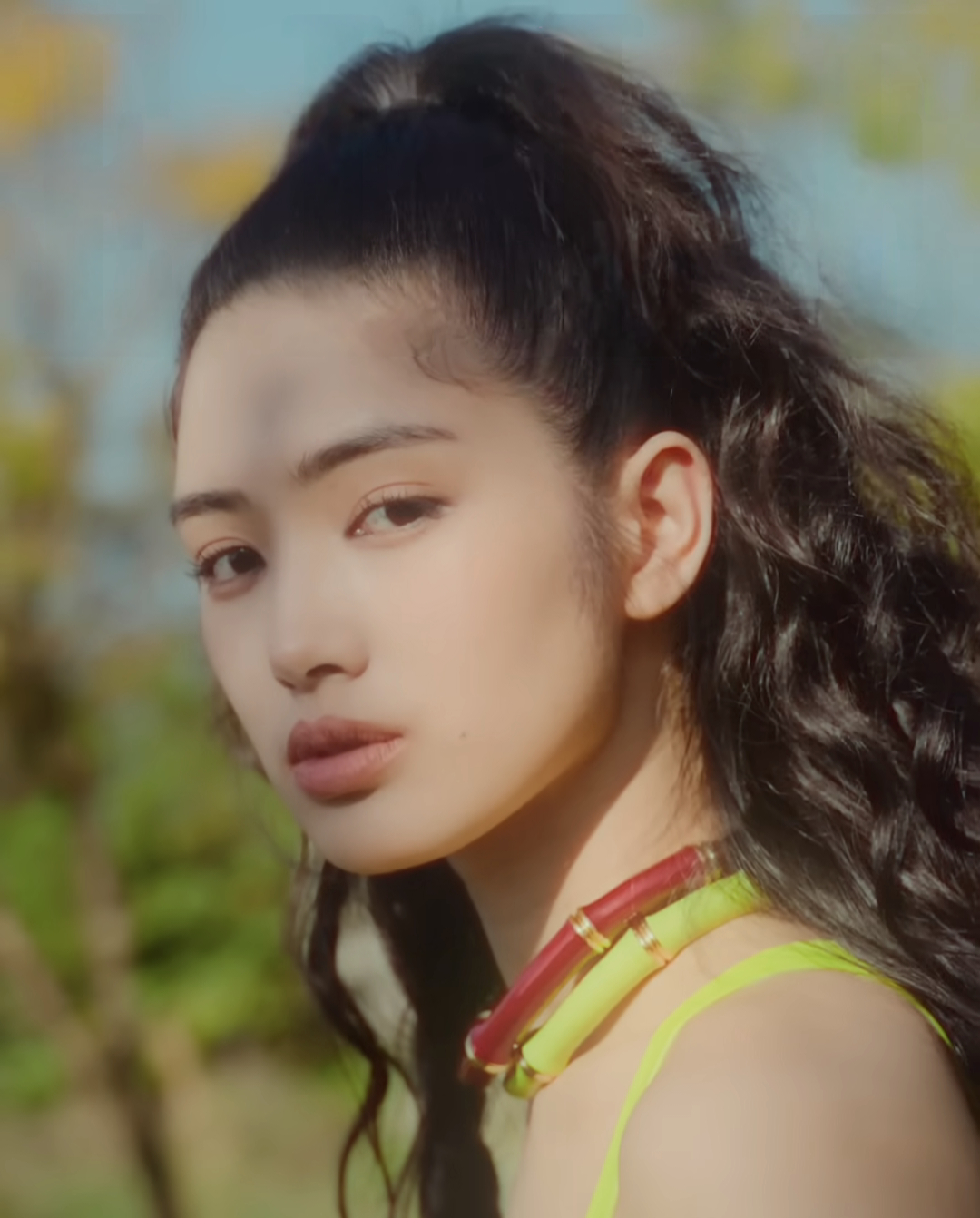
- Lei in February 2025
- Born: Lei Jia-rui; 2000 (age 25–26); Puli, Nantou, Taiwan
- Education: Kainan University (BA)
- Occupation: Actress
- Years active: 2020–present

Regina Lei Jia-rui (Chinese: 雷嘉汭; born 2000) is a Taiwanese actress. She made her feature film debut as Kat in the zombie film The Sadness (2021) and rose to prominence with her role as Leena in the PTS series Port of Lies (2023), for which she was nominated for Best Leading Actress in the 59th Golden Bell Awards. She made her Korean debut in Twelve in 2025.

== Early life and education ==
Lei was born in 2000 in Puli, Nantou, Taiwan, and grew up with a younger brother. She studied at a Buddhist school, and was a member of her high school cheerleading team. She later pursued applied Japanese at Kainan University, graduating with a Bachelor of Arts in 2022. In her freshman year, a friend of her mother who worked as a talent agent encouraged Lei to film an audition tape, leading to her casting as an advertisement model. She began working part-time in advertising in 2018, and accumulated around 40 advertisements over the next three years. She also started filming music videos, which she found enjoyable and sparked her interest in acting.

== Career ==
Lei decided to pursue an acting career after graduating from university, and made her debut in the horror anthology series 76 Horror Bookstore. She then made her feature film debut as the female lead, Kat, alongside Berant Zhu's character Jim, a couple trying to reconnect during a zombie apocalypse, in Rob Jabbaz's zombie film The Sadness. Han Cheung of Taipei Times praised her for doing a "satisfactory job" for a debut; while Jasneet Singh of Collider commended Lei's "emotional performances" that evoke sympathy from the audience as they "witness the ordeal through [her character's] eyes". She also appeared as the younger version of Christina Mok's character in the SET series Love is Science?. She was named Top Talent by Taipei Film Festival in 2022.

In 2023, Lei delivered a breakout performance in her starring role as Leena, an Indonesian caretaker appointed as a court translator for a fellow Indonesian accused of murder in the PTS series Port of Lies. She was cast three weeks before filming after the original Indonesian actress was unable to travel to Taiwan due to the COVID-19 pandemic, and Lei secured the role by auditioning while wearing a hijab. To prepare for her character, Lei learned Indonesian, Javanese, and Arabic, and practiced Muslim customs for a short period. Lu Hao-ping of Global Views Monthly described her acting as "perfect", making her "seem like an Indonesian migrant herself"; while The Storm Media ranked her performance as the second best among the ensemble cast based on audience responses. She was also nominated for Best Leading Actress in a Miniseries or Television Film in the 59th Golden Bell Awards with the role. The same year, she landed another starring role as Wang Yu-fan, a girl loved by Huang Kuan-chih's character who seeks sorcery to win her affection, in the horror film Antikalpa.

In 2024, Lei made a cameo appearance as a sky lantern saleswoman in the fourth season of the Japanese TV Tokyo series Recommendations for Solo Live Girls, which was filmed in Taiwan. She starred in a leading role in the Taiwanese-Indian comedy film Demon Hunters, and made her Korean debut with the U+ Mobile TV series Twelve. Lei studied Korean for a year and participated in auditions in South Korea to secure the role. Lei also would be starring in a romantic action film Wanted alongside Shin Hyun-joon.

== Filmography ==
=== Film ===
Year	Title	Role	Notes
2021	The Sadness	Kat (曾凱婷)	
2023	Antikalpa	Wang Yu-fan (王羽凡)	
2025	Demon Hunters	Alumi (阿嚕米)	
2026	Wanted	Yan-fei	

=== Television ===
Year	Title	Role	Notes
2020	76 Horror Bookstore	Hsiao Min (小敏)	Main role; segment: Hide and Seek
2021	Love is Science?	Young Yen Fei (顏霏)	Guest role
2023	Port of Lies	Leena (莉娜)	Main role
2024	Recommendations for Solo Live Girls	Sky lantern saleswoman	Cameo
2025	Twelve	Bang-wool (방울)	Main role

== Awards and nominations ==
Year	Award	Category	Nominated work	Result	Ref.
2024	59th Golden Bell Awards	Best Leading Actress in a Miniseries or Television Film	Port of Lies	Nominated	
