= Phil Nobile Jr. =

American film director

Phil Nobile Jr. is an American writer, producer, and director of non-fiction video entertainment. He is currently the Editor-in-Chief of Fangoria. He is also known for his movie reviews for Birth.Movies.Death.

== Career ==
Nobile was a producer in Philadelphia from 2001-2018, working on game shows, home improvement shows, true crime series and other documentary projects.

At the website Birth.Movies.Death., he wrote about genre films for eight years from 2010-2018, with a focus on the James Bond franchise. His writing on the Bond franchise has also appeared on Rotten Tomatoes, Esquire, and Thrillist.

In March 2018, Nobile became Editor-in-Chief of the American horror film magazine Fangoria.

== Filmography (selected) ==
| Year | Title | Director | Producer | Writer | Actor | Notes |
|---|---|---|---|---|---|---|
| 2003 | Flesh Wounds | Yes | Yes | Yes | No | Short film |
| 2010 | Halloween: The Inside Story | Yes | Yes | Yes | No | Feature-length documentary |
| 2011 | Inside Story: Fatal Attraction | No | Yes | Yes | No | Television film |
| 2013 | Killer Profile | Yes | Yes | No | No | True crime series |
| 2019 | Horror Noire | No | Yes | No | No | Executive Producer |
| 2019 | In Search of Darkness | No | No | No | Yes | Self |
| 2019 | Satanic Panic | No | Yes | No | No | Executive producer |
| 2019 | VFW | No | Yes | No | No | Executive producer |
| 2020 | Cursed Films | No | No | No | Yes | Self |
| 2020 | In Search of Darkness: Part II | No | No | No | Yes | Self |
