= Crossed (film) =

- Teaser poster
- Directed by: Rob Jabbaz
- Screenplay by: Garth Ennis
- Based on: Crossed by: Garth Ennis; Jacen Burrows
- Produced by: Carl Choi; Benjamin Hung; Ken Levin; Carl Amari
- Starring: Devin Druid; Ash Santos
- Cinematography: Benji Bakshi
- Edited by: Juan Aguinaga
- Production companies: Six Studios; Retro Entertainment; Nightsky Productions
- Country: United States
- Language: English

Crossed is an upcoming American post-apocalyptic horror film based on the comic series by Garth Ennis and Jacen Burrows. It was directed by Rob Jabbaz and written by Ennis.

== Synopsis ==
A small group must survive against a pandemic that causes its victims to turn into bloodthirsty maniacs known as the "Crossed" due to a large, cross-like rash appearing on their faces, who engage in sadistic killing, rape, cannibalism, and maiming themselves for fun.

== Cast ==
- Devin Druid as Stan
- Ash Santos as Cindy
- Ethan Jones Romero as Thomas
- Kyla Hee as Kelly
- Chido Nwokocha as Kitrick
- Spenser Granese as Brett
- Bob Morley as Randall
- Ana Mulvoy-Ten as Sheena
- Steven Hack as Geoff
- Lorenzo Ross as Patrick
- Owen Harn as Horsecock
- Fedor Steer as Face
- Kelvin Adekunle as Stump
- Angie Campbell as Amy
- Peter Falls as Joel

== Production ==
In August 2024, it was announced that a live-action adaptation of Crossed was in development, with Garth Ennis writing the screenplay. In January 2025, Rob Jabbaz was hired to direct the film. Principal photography wrapped in July 2025 in Los Angeles, after only 21 days of shooting.

== See also ==
- The Sadness
