= The Sadness =

2021 film by Rob Jabbaz

- Theatrical release poster
- Traditional Chinese: 哭悲
- Hanyu Pinyin: Kū Bēi
- Hokkien POJ: Khàu-pi
- Directed by: Rob Jabbaz
- Written by: Rob Jabbaz
- Produced by: Jeffrey Huang; David Barker; Wei-Chun Lu
- Starring: Berant Zhu; Regina Lei; Tzu-Chiang Wang
- Cinematography: Jie-Li Bai
- Edited by: Rob Jabbaz
- Music by: TZECHAR
- Production company: Machi Xcelsior Studios
- Distributed by: Raven Banner Entertainment
- Release date: 22 January 2021
- Running time: 100 minutes
- Country: Taiwan
- Languages: Taiwanese Hokkien; Mandarin
- Box office: $430.254

The Sadness (Chinese: 哭悲; pinyin: Kū Bēi; lit. 'Cry Sad') is a 2021 Taiwanese body horror film written, directed, and edited by Canadian filmmaker Rob Jabbaz in his feature directorial debut. It stars Berant Zhu and Regina Lei (in her feature film debut role) as a young couple attempting to reunite amidst a viral pandemic that turns people into homicidal maniacs.

Produced by Machi Xcelsior Studios and David Barker, the film received a theatrical release in Taiwan on 22 January 2021, and premiered internationally at the 74th Locarno International Film Festival on 12 August 2021. It received mostly positive reviews from critics.

== Plot ==
Jim and his girlfriend Kat are preparing for their usual day at an apartment complex in Taipei. Online, Jim sees that medical experts and government officials in Taiwan continue to debate the "Alvin virus", which causes an infection with symptoms similar to influenza. Virologist Dr. Alan Wong warns that the virus has a high potential for mutation. However, the government downplays the threat while prioritizing its re-election campaign, and much of the general public remains sceptical. Jim spots an elderly woman covered in blood on a nearby rooftop, but she disappears when he looks away.

As Jim drives Kat to the subway station, they pass an ambulance carrying a bloodied corpse on a stretcher. After dropping her off, Jim stops at a cafe, where the same elderly woman appears. She viciously attacks the cook with a frying basket and spits mucus at a customer who attempts to intervene, causing him to attack and kill other patrons. The woman chases Jim but is struck by an infected driver. Jim returns to his apartment, witnessing the chaos caused by the infection throughout the city. While attempting to contact Kat, he is attacked by their infected neighbour, Mr. Lin, who cuts off two of his fingers with hedge clippers. Jim knocks Lin unconscious and escapes.

On the subway, Kat is sexually harassed by an older businessman, prompting her to switch seats with a student named Molly. An infected man boards the train and begins stabbing passengers indiscriminately, killing and infecting several of them. The infected businessman stabs Molly in the eye with his umbrella. Kat helps the injured Molly out of the station, pursued by the businessman, who uses a fire axe to kill a bystander attempting to defend them. They narrowly escape when a subway employee named Kevin closes the station's security shutter. Meanwhile, Jim continues trying to contact Kat as he drives through the increasingly chaotic city. After bandaging his injured hand and arming himself with a billhook, he attempts to intervene when he sees a group of infected boys beating and torturing a man on a basketball court. However, the supposed victim is also infected, and the group is engaging in a sadomasochistic game. Jim is forced to flee.

Kat, Molly and Kevin reach a hospital filled with survivors and police officers, where Molly receives treatment for her injured eye. Kat takes Kevin's phone and uses it to inform Jim of their whereabouts. They watch a televised address by the president and the Chief of the General Staff, who promise to contain the infection. However, the general reveals that he is infected and detonates a grenade. A fight subsequently breaks out in the hospital waiting room between the president's supporters and those angered by his death. As the police attempt to restore order, Kat spots the businessman approaching the hospital entrance and leaves the room before he kills one of the officers. Infected individuals then break into the waiting room, killing or infecting everyone inside. Kevin survives by hiding underneath a cart and witnesses the businessman infecting Molly by raping her through her injured eye socket. Jim eventually contacts Kat and tells her to remain where she is while he makes his way to the hospital. However, he begins showing signs of infection when he starts crying and hallucinates a discarded mannequin head taunting him. Kevin attempts to escape the hospital but stumbles upon an orgy involving several infected individuals. He is spotted by Molly, who restrains him with the help of the others before killing him with a bone saw.

The businessman pursues Kat, who blinds him with a fire extinguisher before beating him to death with it. Dr. Wong, who has taken refuge in the hospital's maternity ward, allows Kat into a secured room. Holding her at gunpoint, he forces her to undress and shower to remove any traces of infected blood. Wong explains that the mutated Alvin virus affects the limbic system, causing infected individuals to act on their most violent and sadistic impulses while retaining their intelligence and ability to speak. He also reveals that he has been in contact with the military, which is sending a helicopter to evacuate him from the city. Wong gives Kat a fresh set of medical scrubs, but when she disposes of her contaminated clothes, she discovers an infected infant in a biohazard bin. Wong then injects Kat with a sample of the virus and handcuffs her. He reveals that he used newborn infants for human trials in an attempt to develop an antibody against the virus. After discovering that none of them were immune, he killed them. Wong explains that if Kat does not develop symptoms within five minutes, she is likely immune and will be taken with him during the evacuation.

When Kat does not develop symptoms within the allotted time, Wong prepares to take her to the hospital's helipad. He frees her and contacts the military to arrange a helicopter evacuation, warning her that the soldiers will not rescue her without him. As they make their way to the roof, two infected individuals attack them. Wong manages to kill both attackers but is wounded in the process. Jim then confronts them outside the maternity ward, having fully succumbed to the infection. Wong shoots him in the neck, but his 3D-printed pistol explodes after the second shot, allowing Jim to kill him. Before dying, Wong expresses his enjoyment of euthanizing the infected infants. Kat locks herself behind a metal gate in the stairwell leading to the roof, keeping Jim at a distance. When Jim appears to plead with her, Kat asks him how the infection feels. Dying from his injuries, Jim explains that the virus has given him a sense of purpose and describes his "love" for her as a desire to torture and kill her. Kat breaks down and laughs hysterically before running up the stairs towards the helipad. The camera then pans to Jim's corpse, which is still grinning, as gunshots are heard and Kat screams off-screen.

== Cast ==
- Berant Zhu as Jim
- Regina Lei as Kat
- Ying-Ru Chen as Molly
- Tzu-Chiang Wang as the Businessman
- Emerson Tsai as Warren Liu
- Wei-Hua Lan as Dr. Alan Wong
- Ralf Chiu as Mr. Lin
- Chi-Min Chou as Old Woman
- Lue-Keng Huang as Kevin
- An-Long Cai as President
- Chang-Han Liou as General

== Production ==
The Sadness was shot on Red Digital Cinema "Monstro" cameras with Arri "Signature Prime" lenses. Filming lasted 28 days in Keelung and Taipei. The film's special effects were handled by IF SFX Art Maker. The effects crew spent up to three months producing a number of practical artificial heads, including some that could be made to explode or spray blood, as well as prostheses, organs, and other props. Production designer Liu Chin-Fu oversaw the film's set design, which included a subway car and a hospital.

== Release ==
The Sadness was released in Taiwan on 22 January 2021. It had its international premiere at the 74th Locarno International Film Festival in Switzerland on 12 August 2021. It was screened at the 25th Fantasia International Film Festival in Canada in August 2021, as well as at Fantastic Fest in the U.S. in September 2021.

Raven Banner Entertainment acquired the worldwide distribution rights to the film. In April 2022, it was confirmed that the film would begin streaming on Shudder on May 12, 2022.

== Reception ==
=== Critical response ===
The Sadness received positive reviews upon release. On the review aggregator website Rotten Tomatoes, 88% of 48 critics' reviews are positive, with an average rating of 6.9/10. The website's consensus reads: "The Sadness lives up to its title with an unstintingly grim -- and overall effective -- slice of dystopian horror." Metacritic, which uses a weighted average, assigned the film a score of 68 out of 100, based on 7 critics, indicating "generally favorable" reviews.

Film Threat's Alex Saveliev awarded The Sadness a 10/10 score, calling it "some kind of genius, propelling ahead with a vicious force, full throttle, both embracing and disregarding convention". Saveliev praised the style of the film, observing that "it's made with filmmaking finesse, elegantly structured, with a gorgeous electronic score helping to drive the narrative [...] obvious allusions to the current pandemic resonate, skillfully avoiding the 'overwrought' trap". Han Cheung of the Taipei Times called the film a "slickly-produced gorefest", noting the "fast-paced action and not-so-subtle digs at the government and humanity" but lamenting "the oversimplified plot and lack of attention to storytelling nuances and details".

Phuong Le of The Guardian gave the film 3/5 stars, writing, "Unencumbered by a need to explicitly spell out any overarching message, The Sadness accentuates gore's tactile yuckiness, utilising practical effects in a fashion that recalls retro exploitation flicks." She criticized the film's use of erotic violence as "a desensitising misstep" and added, "Nevertheless the assured command of style situates Jabbaz as an impressive new voice in horror cinema."

Some people have compared the film to the comic book series Crossed. In January, 2025 it was announced that Rob Jabbaz would be directing the comic's film adaptation.

=== Awards ===
At the 2021 Fantasia International Film Festival, The Sadness won the award for Best Film in the New Flesh competition for first features.

Fantastic Fest awarded The Sadness Best Picture and Best Director in its 2021 horror competition.

== See also ==
- Crossed, an upcoming film adaptation of the comic book series of the same name, also directed by Rob Jabbaz.
