= Cam (film) =

2018 film by Daniel Goldhaber

- Release poster
- Directed by: Daniel Goldhaber
- Screenplay by: Isa Mazzei
- Story by: Daniel Goldhaber; Isa Mazzei; Isabelle Link-Levy
- Produced by: Isabelle Link-Levy; Adam Hendricks; John Lang; Greg Gilreath
- Starring: Madeline Brewer; Patch Darragh; Melora Walters; Devin Druid; Imani Hakim; Michael Dempsey
- Cinematography: Katelin Arizmendi
- Edited by: Daniel Garber
- Music by: Gavin Brivik
- Production companies: Divide/Conquer; Blumhouse Productions; Gunpowder & Sky
- Distributed by: Netflix
- Release dates: July 18, 2018 (Fantasia); November 16, 2018 (United States)
- Running time: 95 minutes
- Country: United States
- Language: English
- Budget: $1 million

Cam is a 2018 American psychological horror film directed by Daniel Goldhaber and written by Isa Mazzei from a story by Goldhaber, Mazzei, and Isabelle Link-Levy. The story is partially drawn from writer Mazzei's own experience working as a camgirl. The film is the first feature film for both Goldhaber and Mazzei. A co-production between Divide/Conquer, Blumhouse Productions, and Gunpowder & Sky, the film stars Madeline Brewer, Patch Darragh, Melora Walters, Devin Druid, and Michael Dempsey.

The film premiered at the Fantasia International Film Festival on July 18, 2018, and was released on Netflix on November 16, 2018. It received a largely positive reception from critics, who praised the atmosphere, direction, and Brewer's performance.

== Plot ==
Alice Ackerman works as a camgirl on a website called FreeGirlsLive under the name "Lola_Lola". Obsessed with her rank on the site, she hopes to become number one. Alice's mother believes she works in web development; her younger brother Jordan persuades Alice to tell their mother the truth. Alice has two loyal viewers, Barney and Arnold, with whom she regularly engages in direct messages. One night, while streaming, she commits suicide by slitting her throat at the request of an anonymous user (later revealed to be Arnold), only to then reawaken and reveal it was a stunt.

While chatting with Barney that night, she learns that he will be in her area soon and agrees to a date with him. While shopping for Jordan's birthday, Alice sees Arnold. She angrily confronts him later, assuming he has moved to her area to be closer to her, though he insists that he simply coincidentally got a job nearby.

One morning, Alice finds that she cannot access her FreeGirlsLive account, though the account is still active and streaming. She finds that the channel has been taken over by someone with her exact appearance and mannerisms. Alice contacts FreeGirlsLive's customer service, believing that they are replaying past shows, but they assure her that this is impossible. When Alice messages the channel, the "Lola" onscreen responds to her directly. Alice confides in her fellow camgirls, who agree that the situation is strange but deny responsibility for it.

All of Alice's attempts to either access her FreeGirlsLive account or create a new one fail. At Jordan's birthday party, a fight ensues between him and his friends after they happen across one of the fake Lola's streams and ridicule her, inadvertently revealing the truth to her mother. Humiliated, Alice panics and leaves.

That night, the fake Lola hosts a show in which she stages her own suicide by shooting herself in the mouth. Alice contacts the police, who are unhelpful and judgmental. When the fake Lola announces an upcoming joint show with fellow camgirl BabyGirl, Alice unsuccessfully attempts to get in contact with the latter.

When "Lola" goes live during Alice's date with Barney, he assaults Alice, accusing her of lying about her identity to scam him, but she escapes. She later uses information provided by Barney to determine that Baby's real name is Hannah Darin and that the real Hannah died in a car accident six months prior. She searches for other camgirls she assumes to be doppelgängers, noticing that they each have Arnold as their top friend.

Alice seeks Arnold out at his motel and begs for his help. He agrees, professing his love for her. She later falls asleep and awakens in the middle of the night to find Arnold in a private cam session with Lola. An enraged Alice demands answers; Arnold explains that he knows about the replicas, but is not behind them, nor does he know what causes them or how they work. Alice then talks to the fake Lola from Arnold's computer. The entity does not comment on the fact that they are identical, apparently unable to recognize what it is replicating. Alice angrily leaves, ignoring Arnold's pleas with her to stay.

Alice goes home and sets up her vanity mirror, camera, and television in a position that creates an illusion showing multiple images of herself. She joins a private cam session with the fake Lola (who once again does not recognize her) and suggests that they go live together, to which the fake Lola enthusiastically agrees. Viewers chalk up the two Lolas to special effects. Alice challenges Lola to a game in which they imitate each other. Whoever the viewers think does the best wins—if Alice wins, she gets to ask anything of Lola. Alice is declared the winner after breaking her own nose. She demands Lola's password, then deletes the account just as it reaches the number-one rank.

Some time later, Alice creates a new account, "EveBot", using a fake ID with the moniker "Emily Ramsay" and enlisting her mother's assistance with cosmetics. She cheerfully greets her viewers as her first stream as "Eve" begins.

== Cast ==
- Madeline Brewer as Alice / Lola
- Patch Darragh as Arnold / Tinker
- Melora Walters as Lynne, Alice's mother
- Devin Druid as Jordan, Alice's brother
- Imani Hakim as Baby, a top camgirl
- Michael Dempsey as Barney / BarnacleBob
- Flora Diaz as Fox, Alice's camgirl friend
- Samantha Robinson as Princess_X, a competitor
- Jessica Parker Kennedy as Katie
- Quei Tann as LuckyDuck
- Longmont Potion Castle as operator

== Production ==
Screenwriter Isa Mazzei, a former camgirl herself, wanted to create a documentary film about camgirls. She decided that a documentary was not the best medium, telling Vice, "I felt like often, for people that I talk to about camming, no matter how much I would explain it or show it to them, they still didn't fully get it." She decided a horror film would be a better way to present the story.

Much of the story was drawn from Mazzei's own experience as a camgirl. The story element of Lola having her image stolen came from Mazzei having her camming videos pirated and reposted without crediting her. Alice's interactions with the police officers are taken from Mazzei and other sex workers' experiences of being dismissed and hit on when reaching out for help. According to Mazzei, the question one of the police officers asks her, "What's the weirdest thing you've ever had to do?", was actually asked of her by several Hollywood executives in meetings once they learned that she had previously worked as a cam model.

Mazzei and director Daniel Goldhaber had been friends since high school, and he had previously directed some of her pornographic videos. Goldhaber's directing credits had previously only been shorts and student films.

The film was shot over 20 days. Principal photography began on March 27, 2017. The film wrapped on April 23, 2017.

The film has a joint opening credit "A Film by Isa Mazzei & Daniel Goldhaber", in place of the traditional opening credit which only credits the director. According to Mazzei and Goldhaber this was done as "a rebuke to director-oriented auteurship".

== Release ==
Cam had its world premiere at the Fantasia International Film Festival on July 18, 2018. Shortly afterward, Netflix acquired distribution rights to the film. It was released on November 16, 2018. After the film was removed from Netflix on November 16, 2025, it was made available on Daniel Goldhaber's website with a Vimeo link to the film on June 4, 2026.

== Reception ==
=== Critical response ===
On the review aggregator website Rotten Tomatoes, the film holds an approval rating of 93% based on 103 reviews, with an average rating of 7.2/10. The website's critics consensus reads, "Smart and suspenseful, Cam is a techno-thriller that's far more than the sum of its salacious parts – and an outstanding showcase for Madeline Brewer in the leading role." On Metacritic, which assigns a weighted average score out of 100 to reviews from mainstream critics, the film received an average score of 71, based on 17 critics, indicating "generally favorable" reviews.

Bryan Bishop of The Verge wrote that Brewer's performance "performance goes a long way toward making all this work" and noted that the film's premise is "unsettling enough in the way it taps into fears of identity theft and the implications of losing a carefully curated online persona", describing the film as "more relatable and terrifying even than an average Black Mirror episode". Yomi Adegoke of The Guardian praised the film's "dreamy visuals plucked straight from Tumblr's heyday" and wrote that "Cam is at its heart an excellent exploration of personas and projection online, artfully displayed by how well Brewer oscillates between nervy and anxious Alice then the fearless, confident Lola, as well as the robotic, disconcerting Lola 2.0."

David Ehrlich of IndieWire commented that "[Daniel] Goldhaber's steady hand ensures that things are rivetingly queasy from start to finish, and Brewer's performance is powerful enough to flip the script on the entire cam experience", comparing the film to the works of director David Lynch and photographer Gregory Crewdson. Aja Romano of Vox praised Brewer's "stellar" performance and concluded, "Ultimately as cheeky as it is scary, Cam is a seduction disguised as a sermon, and it's all the better for it." Alison Foreman of Mashable praised Cam as a "masterful, layered work of horror about a cam girl" and wrote, "More than a disturbingly sexy Unfriended, CAM uses its adult setting to indirectly address feminist themes and motifs in a way that is not only nuanced, but also highly effective."

In a mixed review, Jeannette Catsoulis of The New York Times wrote, "Despite a strong premise and a terrific lead performance, the movie suffers visually from too many shots of screens within screens and scrolling, emoji-enhanced requests for live-streamed lewd behavior." Stephen Dalton of The Hollywood Reporter described Cam as "Lewis Carroll meets David Lynch" and praised Brewer's "solid, nuanced" performance, but felt that the film "sacrifices some of its suspenseful momentum for an open-ended, fablelike resolution that will leave some viewers dissatisfied."

=== Accolades ===
Accolades for Cam
Award	Date of ceremony	Category	Recipient(s)	Result	Ref.
Brooklyn Horror Film Festival	October 23, 2018	Best Actress – Head Trip Competition	Madeline Brewer	Won	
Brooklyn Horror Film Festival	October 23, 2018	Best Production Design – Head Trip Competition	Emma Rose Mead	Won	
Brooklyn Horror Film Festival	October 23, 2018	Audience Choice Award	Cam	Won	
Fantasia International Film Festival	July 24, 2018	New Flesh Award for Best Feature Film	Daniel Goldhaber	Won	
Fantasia International Film Festival	July 24, 2018	Cheval Noir Award for Best Screenplay	Isa Mazzei	Won	
Philadelphia Film Festival	October 30, 2018	Archie Award for Best Feature Film	Daniel Goldhaber	Nominated	
