= Dead Meat (YouTube channel) =

American YouTube channel

- The logo of the Dead Meat channel

YouTube information
- Channel: Dead Meat
- Years active: 2017–present
- Subscribers: 7.06 million
- Views: 3.3 billion
- Last updated: October 25, 2026
- Website: deadmeat.rip

Dead Meat is an American YouTube channel dedicated to horror and horror-adjacent media. Dead Meat was created in 2017 by James A. Janisse and is owned and operated by Janisse and his wife Chelsea Rebecca. It is known mainly for the web series The Kill Count, which covers the body counts of horror media, along with comedic commentary and behind-the-scenes information. Dead Meat also hosts the Dead Meat Podcast which was launched by Rebecca with Janisse as a co-host in 2018.

A secondary channel for horror video games, Dead Meat Games, is hosted by Zoran Gvojic. Since 2022, Dead Meat have done an annual award ceremony named the Dead Meat Horror Awards, which celebrates achievements in the horror film genre. As of 2023, Dead Meat is working on a feature length film, Pre-Game, and in 2026 released a horror anthology film, Fresh Meat. The YouTube channel has over 7 million subscribers. Dead Meat has received generally positive reception from critics and horror filmmakers.

== History ==
James A. Janisse and Chelsea Rebecca in 2024

James A. Janisse and Chelsea Rebecca met as film students at the University of Michigan. After having some success with comedy YouTube channels, Janisse spent November 2016 to April 2017 in pre-production on a new horror-focused channel. The name "Dead Meat" was chosen as it is a common turn-of-phrase in the genre. The first Dead Meat video, the first episode of The Kill Count covering Friday the 13th, was uploaded on April 7, 2017. As of 2026, the channel has over 1,800 videos and 7 million subscribers.

== Content ==
=== The Kill Count ===
The channel is known primarily for its The Kill Count series, where Janisse summarizes horror films, counts the number of deaths within them, and offers behind-the-scenes insights. At the end of each episode, a breakdown of the kills, known as "the numbers", is shared, which includes a final tally, a gender breakdown, and awards for the coolest kill (Golden Chainsaw) and lamest kill (Dull Machete). The channel is mainly hosted by Janisse, with Rebecca and channel co-writer Zoran Gvojic occasionally serving as auxiliary hosts.

A wide array of horror films have been covered, including well-known and popular franchises such as Child's Play, A Nightmare on Elm Street, Friday the 13th, Halloween, The Texas Chainsaw Massacre, Saw, Scream, and It, as well as classic horror films, cult-classic horror films, and lesser-known exploitation and B movies. The Kill Count has branched out to discuss other media in the horror genre, including television, video games, stage productions, music videos, comic books, and YouTube originals such as Don't Hug Me I'm Scared. In May 2026, Dead Meat released a new channel dedicated to horror video games, video game film adaptations, and tabletop games, Dead Meat Games. It is hosted by Zoran Gvojic. The first Kill Count for the channel was the 2024 game Fear the Spotlight.

=== Dead Meat Podcast ===
In 2018, Rebecca launched the Dead Meat Podcast, with Janisse as a co-host. The podcast explores horror films, industry trends, and cultural significance, featuring reviews, interviews, thematic discussions, and games based around the horror genre and related trivia. Content on the Dead Meat Podcast includes behind-the-scenes information and research, such as an episode on final girls, which drew on the work of Carol Clover. In 2025, the Dead Meat Podcast became part of Bloody Disgusting's BloodyFM podcast network.

=== Dead Meat Horror Awards ===
Dead Meat began presenting the annual Dead Meat Horror Awards in 2022, which celebrates achievements in the horror film genre. Categories include: Best Stunts/Choreography, Best Digital Effects, Best Practical Effects, Best Production Design, Best Kill, Best Villain, Best Supporting Performer, Best Lead Performer, Best Director, Fan Favorite, Best Remake/Sequel, and Best Original Film. In 2026, the Dead Meat Horror Awards hosted a ticketed live-stream event, with talent in attendance, and a red carpet, at the Pacific Electric in Los Angeles.

== Other activities ==
In 2018, Janisse played the role of Raymond in the second season of Crypt TV's Look-See. Janisse and Rebecca had a cameo in the 2022 film Scream as two fictional YouTube movie critics for a YouTube channel called Film Fails. Also in 2022, James and Chelsea were invited to tour the house used in the original Scream. In December 2024, Janisse and Rebecca served as executive producers and were featured in a music video for musician T-Pain's song "Does She Know?". During the 2025 Super Bowl halftime show, Janisse and Rebecca co-hosted a special episode on their channel with The Monkey director Osgood Perkins and actor Elijah Wood, discussing the best horror films of 2024. In 2025, Janisse and Rebecca were featured as guest judges for season 2 episode 3 of The Boulet Brothers' Dragula: Titans.

Janisse and Rebecca started work on a movie of their own called Pre-Game alongside Nick Scadarossi and Max de Leo. A proof of concept teaser has been released. It was also announced that Janisse would be appearing in the 2026 horror anthology called Grind. In May 2026, Jason Blum tweeted a photo of Kane Parsons and Curry Barker, shaking hands on the outskirts of a red carpet. The photo shows Janisse in the background photobombing. In June 2026, Variety announce that Janisse and Rebecca will be cast in the upcoming horror comedy film Best Friends Forever. In July 2026, Janisse and Rebecca announce that they were launching Fresh Meat, a horror short-film competition that culminated in a theatrically released feature anthology. The trailer was released on September 24, 2026 and the movie was be in theaters on October 12, 2026. In September 2026, Rebecca voiced Judith Myers in Halloween: The Game.

== Reception ==
Critical reception for Dead Meat has been generally positive. Jonathan Barkan of Dread Central said that Janisse was "one of YouTube’s biggest horror creators". In 2023, Justina Bonilla of The Hollywood Reporter described The Kill Count as "giving viewers a deeper understanding and appreciation of the art and technicalities of horror." Mike Flanagan, a critically acclaimed horror director, praised the channel, saying "It's not just commentary, it's not just critique, it's excellent entertainment in its own right, and beautifully produced by James and Chelsea". Karen Kemmerle of Decider said that The Kill Count was the "Cliff Notes for Horror Fans". In 2025, Variety included Janisse and Rebecca on their Horror Impact Report. Alison Foreman of IndieWire said Dead Meat has "become one of the genre’s most active online communities and a passionate digital brand." Jason Blum, an American horror film producer, praised Janisse and Chelsea, saying that they "know this genre inside and out, [...] Their audience is exactly who these movies are for.”
