= Emily Zarka =

American folklorist and historian

- Born: United States
- Occupations: Scholar, writer, television host, educator
- Years active: 2012–present
- Employer(s): Arizona State University, PBS Digital Studios
- Known for: Creator and host of Monstrum
- Title: Creator, writer, and host of Monstrum

Academic background
- Education: Ph.D. in English Literature, Arizona State University (2018)
- Alma mater: University of Colorado Boulder
- Thesis: Monstrous Bodies of Knowledge: The Undead as Epistemological Tool in the Romantic Period
- Doctoral advisor: Mark Lussier

Academic work
- Notable works: Monstrum (2019–present), Exhumed: A History of Zombies (2020)
- Website: Monstrum on PBS

Emily Zarka is an American scholar, writer, and media personality, best known for her work as the creator, writer, and host of Monstrum, a PBS Digital Studios series exploring the cultural, historical, and symbolic significance of monsters. Zarka is also a scholar in the fields of Gothic literature, folklore, and horror, with a particular focus on the epistemological role of monsters in literary traditions.

== Early life and education ==
Zarka earned her Ph.D. in English Literature from Arizona State University in May 2018. Her doctoral dissertation was Monstrous Bodies of Knowledge: The Undead as Epistemological Tool in the Romantic Period. In addition to her Ph.D., Zarka holds two undergraduate degrees from the University of Colorado Boulder: a Bachelor of Arts in English and a Bachelor of Science in journalism, both completed in May 2012.

== Career ==
Zarka is a faculty member in the English Department at Arizona State University, where she teaches undergraduate and graduate courses in composition, literature, and the intersection of horror, folklore, and popular culture. As ASU's official "monster expert," she works to combine traditional academic methods with public scholarship, to make complex literary and cultural ideas more accessible through various media.

In 2019, Zarka became the creator, writer, and host of Monstrum, a web series produced by PBS Digital Studios. The series explores the origins, meanings, and impact of monsters from mythology, folklore, and popular culture. Episodes of Monstrum address topics from historical creatures such as the Kraken to more contemporary figures such as zombies, aiming to maintain academic rigor while offering fresh perspectives on the monstrous.

In addition to Monstrum, Zarka co-wrote and hosted the PBS documentary Exhumed: A History of Zombies in 2020, which examines the zombie's cultural evolution from folklore to modern popular media.

== Articles ==
- Zarka, Emily. "The Evolution of the Modern-Day Zombie: What Tales of the Undead Say About Our Attitudes Toward Science." Slate, 18 Jan. 2018.
- Zarka, Emily. “The Sexualized Heroics of Rick and Michonne". The Politics of Race, Gender and Sexuality in The Walking Dead: Essays on the Television Series and Comics, edited by Elizabeth Erwin and Dawn Keetley, McFarland & Company, 2018, pp. 119–128.
- Looser, Devoney, and Emily Zarka. "Annotated Bibliography on the Scholarship of Teaching Jane Austen", Pedagogies Edition: Teaching Jane Austen, Romantic Circles Pedagogy Commons, April 2015. Romantic Circles.
