= James A. Janisse =

American YouTuber (born 1989)

- Janisse in 2024
- Born: James Anthony Janisse; May 6, 1989 (age 37); Detroit, Michigan, U.S.
- Education: University of Michigan (BFTV)
- Occupations: YouTuber; filmmaker; writer; editor; executive producer; actor
- Years active: 2009–present
- Spouse: Chelsea Rebecca (m. 2022)

James Anthony Janisse (born May 6, 1989), is an American YouTuber, filmmaker, and actor. He is best known as the founder and host of the YouTube channel Dead Meat, which features the popular series The Kill Count, horror podcasts, and interviews.

Janisse has appeared in several film and television productions, including In Search of Darkness (2019), Scream (2022), Friendsgiving (2023), Little Bites (2024), and Hysteria! (2024). He also appeared in the second season of the web series The Look-See (2018) and directed Fresh Meat (2026).

== Early life ==
James Anthony Janisse was born on May 6, 1989, in Detroit, Michigan. He developed a passion for horror films at a young age, citing Scream franchise as his introduction to the genre. As a child, he learned HTML to create a website dedicated to counting kills in horror movies. Janisse earned a degree in filmmaking from the University of Michigan.

== Career ==
=== 2009–2016: Early career ===
Before Janisse became a content creator on YouTube, he worked as an actor and appeared in 2009 short film Everyone's a V.I.P. to Someone in a small role. Janisse spent over five years co-running comedy YouTube channels with his now-wife Chelsea Rebecca, starting with Comediocracy and later Practical Folks in 2010. While studying at the University of Michigan, he began making comedy videos together with Rebecca.

In 2011, they founded Comediocracy, which was later removed by YouTube, and then launched Practical Folks with James Graessle and Joel Arnold. Handling most of the editing for Practical Folks limited his creative freedom, so he left the channel and spent late 2016 to early 2017 developing a new horror-focused project, Dead Meat.

=== 2017–present: Dead Meat ===
Janisse launched Dead Meat in 2017 with its flagship show The Kill Count, where he breaks down horror movies, highlights memorable deaths, shares trivia, and notes production details. The channel grew fast, and by 2022 it had 5.94 million subscribers and more than 2 billion views. He is president and executive producer of Dead Meat, which he co-owns with Rebecca, who launched the Dead Meat Podcast in 2018.

In 2018, Janisse appeared in the second season of Crypt TV's The Look-See, where he played the role of Raymond. In 2022, streaming service Shudder sponsored the Dead Meat Horror Awards. Winners, chosen by him and his wife, were presented by their friends from the horror community. He has also appeared in acting roles, such as playing Toby, a store clerk in the Thanksgiving horror-comedy Fiendsgiving alongside Samm Levine. He has expressed interest in professional wrestling and has begun training for a potential future match. He has explained that his on-camera persona in The Kill Count is partly a character, while he is more candid on the podcast. His favorite films include John Carpenter's The Thing and Scream (1996).

== Personal life ==
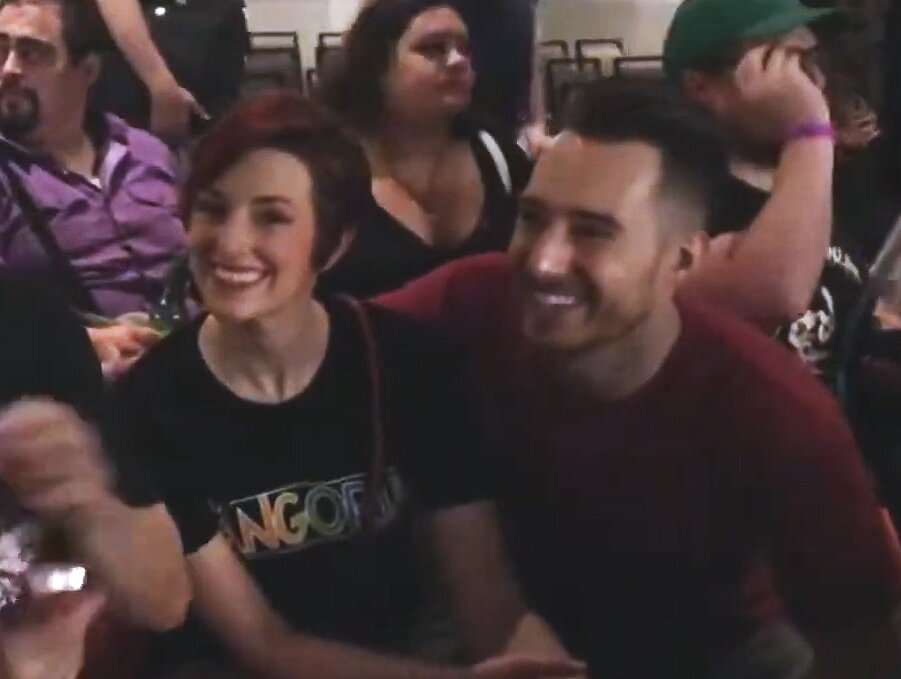
Janisse and his wife Chelsea Rebecca in 2021

Janisse lives in Los Angeles, California, with his wife Chelsea Rebecca. The couple are both horror enthusiasts, and actress Heather Langenkamp officiated their wedding.

== Filmography ==
=== Film ===
Year	Title	Role	Notes	Ref.
2009	Everyone's a V.I.P. to Someone	Ben	Small role	
2019	Hashtag	Beach guy	Short film	
2019	In Search of Darkness	Himself		
2022	Scream	Critic	Cameo	
2023	Fiendsgiving	Toby		
2024	Little Bites	Doug		
2024	Grind	Justin		
2025	The Red Mask	Himself	Cameo	
2025	Frankenbabes from Beyond the Grave!	Newscaster	Executive producer	
2026	Fresh Meat	Butcher Shop Owner	Directorial debut	
2026	Blood Rush †	Zealous Townsfolk Man		

=== Television ===
Year	Title	Role	Notes	Ref.
2018	The Look-See	Raymond	Season 2	
2024	Hysteria!	Male Townsperson	Cameo; Season 1, Episode 3	
2025	The Boulet Brothers' Dragula: Titans	Himself	Season 2	

=== Music videos ===
Year	Title	Artist	Role	Ref.
2014	"Fiona Coyne"	Skylar Spence	Main character	
2019	"On and On"	Foster	Himself	Cameo
2021	"Assault & Batteries"	Ice Nine Kills	Officer Dunbar	
2021	"Rainy Day"	Ice Nine Kills	Officer Dunbar	
2021	"Funeral Derangements"	Ice Nine Kills	Officer Dunbar	
2023	"Welcome to Horrorwood"	Ice Nine Kills	Officer Dunbar	
2025	"Does She Know?"	T-Pain	Executive producer	

=== Other appearances ===
Year	Title	Notes	Ref.
2020	Joe Bob's Haunted Drive-In	Special guest	
