= In Search of Darkness: Part II =

2021 documentary film about horror films from the 1980s

- Poster
- Directed by: David A. Weiner
- Written by: David A. Weiner
- Produced by: David A. Weiner
- Starring: Nancy Allen; Tom Atkins; Doug Bradley; Clancy Brown; Lori Cardille; John Carpenter; Jeffrey Combs; Joe Dante; Keith David; Robert Englund; Jackie Kong
- Edited by: Samuel Way
- Music by: Weary Pines
- Release dates: 6 October 2020 (DVD and Blu-ray); 26 April 2021 (Shudder)
- Running time: 263 minutes
- Language: English

In Search of Darkness: Part II is a 2020 documentary film written and directed by David A. Weiner. It is a sequel to Weiner's 2019 documentary In Search of Darkness.

Unlike the first documentary, which featured more mainstream films, Part II focuses on more obscure movies and features over four hours of new interviews.

For Part II, I definitely made a very concerted effort to go on an international scope and do a lot of the B-sides and straight-to-video deep cuts...There's something special about horror films, where the fans will really love them like their own homely child. They circle the wagons around their favorites and defend them ‘till their dying breath. We all love these films for different reasons and we all acknowledge that while The Shining might be the cream of the crop, Chopping Mall still has a place in our hearts.

The documentary premiered on Shudder on April 26, 2021.

== Reception ==
Movieweb praised the documentary, calling it "a hell of a ride from start to finish." 411Mania gave it 7/10 and opined that while the film was "not as good as the first," it was nonetheless "a worthy successor."
