= Fresh Meat (2026 film) =

Anthology film by Dead Meat

- Theatrical release poster
- Directed by: James A. Janisse
- Production companies: Dead Meat LLC; Atlas Literary; Hades Film
- Distributed by: Dead Meat LLC
- Release date: October 12, 2026
- Running time: 116 minutes
- Country: United States
- Languages: English; Japanese
- Box office: $561,614

Fresh Meat is a 2026 American independent horror anthology film consisting of thirteen independently-produced and compiled short films and a wraparound segment directed by James A. Janisse in his directorial debut. It was distributed by Dead Meat Productions. The film has grossed over $560,000.

== Plot ==
Fresh Meat is presented as an anthology of 13 films interspersed with a wraparound story. There is no central theme, with shorts presented in a variety of methods including animation and found footage.

=== "Sate the Screen" (wraparound segment) ===
- Written and directed by James A. Janisse

The frame narrative focuses on a butcher shop owner and his young daughter, Jessica. Throughout the film, the shop owner provides meat for Jessica to feed to a seemingly sentient freezer. Upon feeding, a screen on the freezer provides Jessica with a series of horrific tales. As the film continues, the freezer repeatedly demands fresher meat, causing the shop owner to resort to murdering a health inspector to satiate the creature. When the shop owner attempts to force the freezer to accept the dead man's leg, the creature responds by biting off the shop owner's hand. After the final segment, Jessica goes to her father, who has bled out from the missing hand. She gets an idea. She is then shown happily continuing to view her stories - having seemingly fed her father to the creature, as well as her arm.

=== "Earworm" ===
- Directed by Benjamin Baraad

A young man scrolls videos online. He comes across a video supposedly taken of a woman just moments after she had killed her children. The video warns the viewer that they "cannot unhear" the music being played. The video then shows the woman standing before an open piano and pulling on the same 4 strings repeatedly, before revealing her blood-soaked body to the cameraman. Disturbed, the man turns off his phone.

The man attends a date with his partner before surprising her with a birthday party at their apartment. During the party, he continues to hear the 4 notes from the video. He is disturbed by visions of the woman, eventually panicking and pulling out a knife in the middle of the party before fleeing the apartment. He sleeps in his car for several days, ignoring phone calls from his girlfriend and wearing his noise cancelling headphones. While picking up groceries, his headphones die and the song begins playing again. He hallucinates the woman from the video, and believes the cashier is threatening him. To alleviate the earworm, he stabs himself in the ears and experiences relief. The film cuts to a YouTube video of the incident that has been posted online. In the video, the man is humming 4 notes.

=== "You'll Be Fine" ===
- Written and directed by Sarah Stephens

A married couple shares a candlelit dinner while reflecting on their recent marital struggles. The wife notes that she is proud of the progress they've made over the past month, and suggests they celebrate with weekly date nights. She excuses herself to the bathroom and fails to notice a figure hiding behind the shower curtain. Upon returning, she initiates a kiss, but is disturbed when her husband growls in response. Startled, he insists he is fine and retreats to the bedroom. The woman follows him, but finds a monstrous entity instead. As she flees the bedroom, the front door opens and her husband walks in, revealing he came because she asked him to and that he has not seen or spoken to her in a month. Realizing the entity is not her husband, she insists they leave but finds she cannot open the front door. Her husband impatiently opens it for her, but freezes when he finally sees the entity standing behind her. In shock, he watches the creature devour his wife before silently leaving the apartment.

=== "The Witchening" ===
- Directed by MK Kopp

A young girl tells her babysitter about a dry patch in the yard, explaining it is the result of witches who once used their land for magic rituals before being executed for witchcraft by the townspeople. The girl claims she was told the story by one of the witches herself, and that the witch left her a gift - an animal jaw once used in a ritual. Concerned, the sitter takes the animal bone and reassures the girl that it was just a scary story.

Downstairs, the babysitter invites her boyfriend over to watch a movie but is disturbed when she sees a figure reflected in the television screen. As she goes to check on her charge, her boyfriend picks up the animal jaw and accidentally cuts his finger and bleeds on it. When the babysitter returns, she finds him standing over a blender, before proceeding to stick his hand into it. He is then compelled to kill himself by stabbing a knife into his eye. Witnessing this, the sitter attempts to flee but is also killed. The girl hides under the kitchen table and watches as the witch drags a body across the floor. Spotting the child, the witch approaches her with a fiendish grin before the segment ends.

=== "Closing Hour" ===
- Directed by Tim Smink

In the film's only animated segment, a young woman working at a convenience store prepares to close for the night. Her estranged boyfriend shows up unexpectedly, apologizing for a mistake he made (implied to be cheating). The woman hesitates to forgive him, but allows him to use the restroom at the back of the store. While he is in the bathroom, the woman notices a masked figure on the security cameras wielding a shotgun. When the masked person enters the store, the woman hides under the counter and hears them enter the bathroom. The woman calls out for them to stop, distracting the person before they can take the shot.

Suddenly the masked attacker is attacked by an unseen force. The woman watches as the attacker is then thrown across the store, a massive hole in their chest. As they die, they offer a small knife to the woman before being dragged back by a massive creature. Realizing the masked assailant was a hunter of some kind, the woman sneaks toward the exit while her boyfriend - now a vicious monster - tears the hunter apart.

Upon reaching the exit, the woman accidentally steps on a cockroach, alerting the creature of her presence. She then runs out the doors and slams the door grate closed, as the creature wraps his arms around her throat. She is able to subdue him with the knife the hunter gave her. The monster taunts her, then begs her to forgive him. The woman uses a nearby gas pump to coat the monster in gasoline before setting him ablaze.

=== "Why Did You Stop Me?" ===
- Directed by Vichhay Tek

In a found footage segment, a police officer pulls over a young woman for driving slowly and without a license plate. The woman repeatedly asks the officer, "Why did you pull me over?" and refuses to provide an ID, stating only her name and date of birth. The office gives the name and DOB to dispatch, who reveal the information belongs to a woman who has been missing for several years. The dispatcher then begins to repeat the girl's question, disturbing the officer. Upon hearing a noise from the trunk of the car, the officer opens it to reveal a corpse in a plastic bag. The officer flees to his car and radios for all available units, only to be attacked by the woman. Dashcam footage shows the woman laughing as she tosses the officer's severed head into the trunk before driving away.

=== "The Way I Feel" ===
- Directed by Joshua Chislett

An experimental therapy claims to help family members cope with their grief through the use of a new technology. A woman explains to an unseen interviewer that she and her husband have been struggling to cope since the body of their young daughter - who had been missing for some time - was found a year ago. The woman and her husband are then seen hooked up to a machine that causes them to "switch" perspectives, allowing each to feel what the other is feeling.

The wife is horrified to discover, while viewing his perspective, that her husband is a resentful and violent man who has fantasized about hurting her. She realizes that he is the one who killed their daughter, and he attacks her. She is then seen fleeing through the property surrounding their home, severely injured while her husband stalks her with a rifle. Her husband, meanwhile, is haunted by visions of his daughter and waves of his wife's grief, which distract him long enough for her to sneak up and stab him. He gains the upper hand until another vision subdues him. The wife picks up the rifle and shoots him in the head.

=== "Koko: The Invisible Dog" ===
- Directed by Haiku

A young girl tells viewers (via a series of drawings) about Koko, her invisible dog. Koko is initially a very normal dog, except for the fact that he is invisible. However, a mysterious illness causes Koko to become aggressive and the dog begins attacking people.

The segment then cuts to a first-person perspective of a teenage girl hiding in the bathroom. Outside, she hears Koko's growls and begs him to calm down to no avail. Attempts to escape are thwarted because she cannot see Koko. When she hears her brother come home, she tries to warn him but can only listen as he is torn apart by the invisible creature. She eventually meets the same fate when she leaves the bathroom to try to get away.

A voiceover from the young girl reveals that she is the younger sister of the two teenagers, that Koko hasn't been seen since, and that her uncle - who found the bodies - told her he does not think Koko was ever a dog at all.

=== "Tchotchke" ===
- Directed by Finn Bell and Ethan Droze

A young man visits an antique store and purchases a tchotchke in the form of a ceramic clown. At home, he places a coin in the clown's mouth and watches in amusement as it swallows. He places the tchotchke in his bedroom closet. That night he has a nightmare that the tchotchke spits a coin at him before coming to life in the form of a monster. When he wakes from the dream, he finds coins on the floor and the tchotchke levitating above the shelf.

Frightened, the man takes the tchotchke back to the antique store but finds it closed. The tchotchke comes to life in the form of a jester and attacks him, subdued only when he places a coin in the tchotchke's mouth. The man becomes obsessed with obtaining as many coins as possible to please the tchotchke, pawning his personal belongings and eventually robbing a coin-operated laundromat. When he is confronted by the store's employee, the tchotchke appears and stabs the employee to death.

The young man flees to his apartment and locks himself in the bathroom. Upon looking in the mirror, he is terrified to find that his face features the same makeup as the clown's. He begins choking and coughs up a single coin before vomiting profusely across the bathroom. The vomiting becomes more violent as the man regurgitates blood and piles of coins, eventually bleeding out and dying.

=== "Jinx" ===
- Directed by Jonnie Stapleton

A couple is shown to be in a rut in their relationship, following the same routine night after night. Though they are seemingly happy together, their peaceful life has become somewhat boring. One night the man suggests he would like to skip their usual Friday night dinner with friends, and the woman is hurt by the idea. He reassures her that he is happy to go to dinner, and they accidentally answer a question in unison, playfully yelling "Jinx!" before falling asleep.

The woman wakes up in the middle of the night to use the restroom, only to find that the man has also gotten up. Startled, she chides him for scaring her, only to find that he is reciting everything she says at the same time she is saying it. He is also mirroring all of her movements, following her back to the bedroom and copying whatever she says and does. As she becomes more agitated and frightened, she flees to the bathroom, failing to realize that by locking him out, she has left him standing beside the staircase. When she paces, he copies her and falls over the railing to the floor below and is gravely injured.

EMTs arrive and the woman tries to explain that she cannot move from the man's side, otherwise he might also move and injure himself further. As she (and the man) speak in unison to the confused EMTs, the jinx slowly begins to spread until all four of them are in sync. She cries out in despair as the segment ends.

=== "What's In Your Bag?" ===
- Directed by Béla Baptiste

A celebrity named Dolly Lewis films a "What's In Your Bag?" segment for an entertainment channel. During her interview she reveals typical items including a book of poetry, vials of essential oils, and a pair of zip ties, which she playfully suggests can be used as handcuffs in an emergency. She eventually pulls an ASP from the bag and offers to demonstrate its use before using it to beat the TV host repeatedly. She then pulls a gun from the bag and forces the host and his cameraman to move to a secondary location.

Upon reaching the second location, the host is attacked by a group of people in plastic suits who hold him down and force him to watch an unseen video (implied to be footage of a crime he committed) before slashing his eye and disemboweling him. The cameraman is forced to film the murder, which he does before retreating outside where he finds Dolly, smiling calmly to herself.

=== "Dagnabbit!" ===
- Written and directed Joshua David Matthews and Jason Sheedy

A man places a folding chair, a cooler of beer, and a rifle in front of a small door leading to the crawlspace beneath his house. Every night, he drinks beer and waits for the door to open before shooting whatever comes out of the darkness. One night, he wakes up to find the crawlspace door open. He falls to the ground, and as something rushes towards him, he grabs the rifle and shoots it. The next night, he ditches the beer and opt for coffee instead, hoping it will help him stay awake. He falls asleep while on watch and fails to wake up as a long, clawed arm emerges from the darkness and drags him inside, seemingly killing him.

One month later, a realtor and his clients explore the yard and discuss using the space for gardening. The crawlspace door opens and as the realtor crouches down to examine it, he is pulled in and killed by the man, now a monstrous creature himself.

=== "Psychopomp" ===
- Directed by Brady Palubiski

A young woman at a carnival is invited to take a ride on a "Demon Bus." She initially walks away but is taunted by the ride operator, who claims it will be the scariest ten minutes of her life. Skeptical, she agrees to board the bus.

As the bus drives through the nearby woods, the woman continues to be unimpressed by the "fake" blood and stained clothing she finds discarded on the floor. When the bus comes to a stop, she notices a man chained to the seats in the back and approaches him. As the man growls and fights against his chains, she comments on how realistic his "mask" is and attempts to touch it, only to have her finger bitten off. She runs to the bus driver, who is revealed to have no eyes, and is forced to leave the bus and flee into the woods before reaching an abandoned salvage yard.

The demon breaks his chains and pursues her through the junkyard, wielding a sledgehammer. She evades him long enough to reach the edge of the yard, but he uses demonic power to blow up several cars. When he catches up to her, he knocks her unconscious and brings her back to the bus.

Upon waking, the girl begs the demon to let her live. As he prepares to deliver the killing blow, the bus suddenly comes to a halt and the door opens to reveal the ride operator, who congratulates her for surviving ten minutes. As the girl leaves the bus in shock, the operator gives her a t-shirt stating she survived the demon bus. The girl gets into her car, stares at the stump where her finger used to be, and lets loose a horrified scream.

=== "Vape Glow" ===
- Written and directed by Steven Schloss

In a segment filmed from the perspective of a vape pen, a young man bickers with his girlfriend over his dependence on his vape before she heads upstairs. The power suddenly goes out, forcing the man to rely on the light from the vape (which only works when he is inhaling) to navigate the pitch-black house. As he finds the front door open, he hears his girlfriend scream and heads upstairs to investigate, hearing strange noises and finding overturned furniture and blood on the floor. Suddenly he is attacked by a zombie-like creature. During the struggle, he shoves the vape into the creature's head and is shocked when it takes the vape and inhales it, seemingly satiated by the contents, before vomiting onto the man, who cries in horror.

Armed personnel enter the house and shoot the creature in the head, citing it as a "heavy user" and insisting it must be contained. From the vape pen's perspective, we see an intruder kill the man's girlfriend when she runs into the room, before the other one crushes the man's head under his boot.

== Cast ==
=== "Sate the Screen" ===
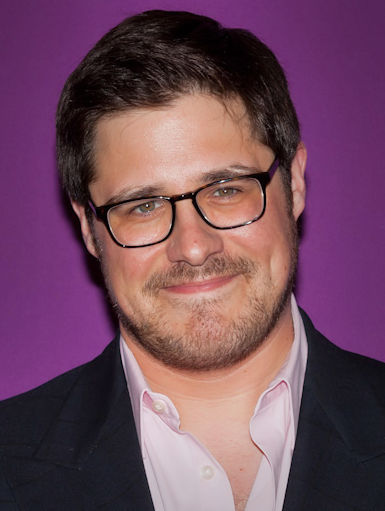
The cast members from the "Sate the Screen" segment. From left to right: James A. Janisse, Chelsea Rebecca, and Rich Sommer.
- James A. Janisse as butcher shop owner
- Elle Riot Fox as Jessica
- Chelsea Rebecca as delivery person
- Rich Sommer as health inspector

=== Rest of Cast (Alphabetically) ===
- Aidan Armstrong
- Béla Baptiste
- Benjamin Baraad
- Finn Bell
- Joshua Chislett
- Ethan Droze
- Haiku
- MK Kopp
- Joshua David Matthews
- Brady Palubiski
- Steven Schloss
- Jason Sheedy
- Tim Smink
- Jonnie Stapleton
- Sarah Stephens
- Vichhay Tek

== Production and release ==
The idea for Fresh Meat was born from Janisse and his wife Chelsea Rebecca's desire to "find, highlight, and amplify people who can do these things and helping develop their ideas and make them bigger", with the pair putting out a call for horror short film submissions in July 2026. The 13 selected films were made from a pool of over 500 and a $2,500 stipend was provided to each winner. It was created in partnership with Atlas Entertainment's Atlas Literary and Hades Film.

A one night only theatrical release was announced on September 24, 2026, with the winner of the competition being decided by those in attendance, as every screening will include a QR code where audiences can vote for their favorite short. The winner will take home a grand prize of $25,000. It was screened on October 12, 2026 in theaters. The film has grossed over $560 thousand. On October 23, Fresh Meat was released for rental on the streaming platform Pijama. Tom Skink, who directed the animated short "Closing Hour", won the $25,000 grand prize.

=== Critical reception ===
On the review aggregator Rotten Tomatoes, there is only one critic review for Fresh Meat. John Odette of Cinefied said the film "will entertain many horror fans; it is a launchpad that works on two fronts: it inspires new voices, yes, but it also reinforces the public trust that Dead Meat isn't a pompous, pretentious one-trick pony."
