= David A. Weiner =

American filmmaker, magazine editor, and journalist

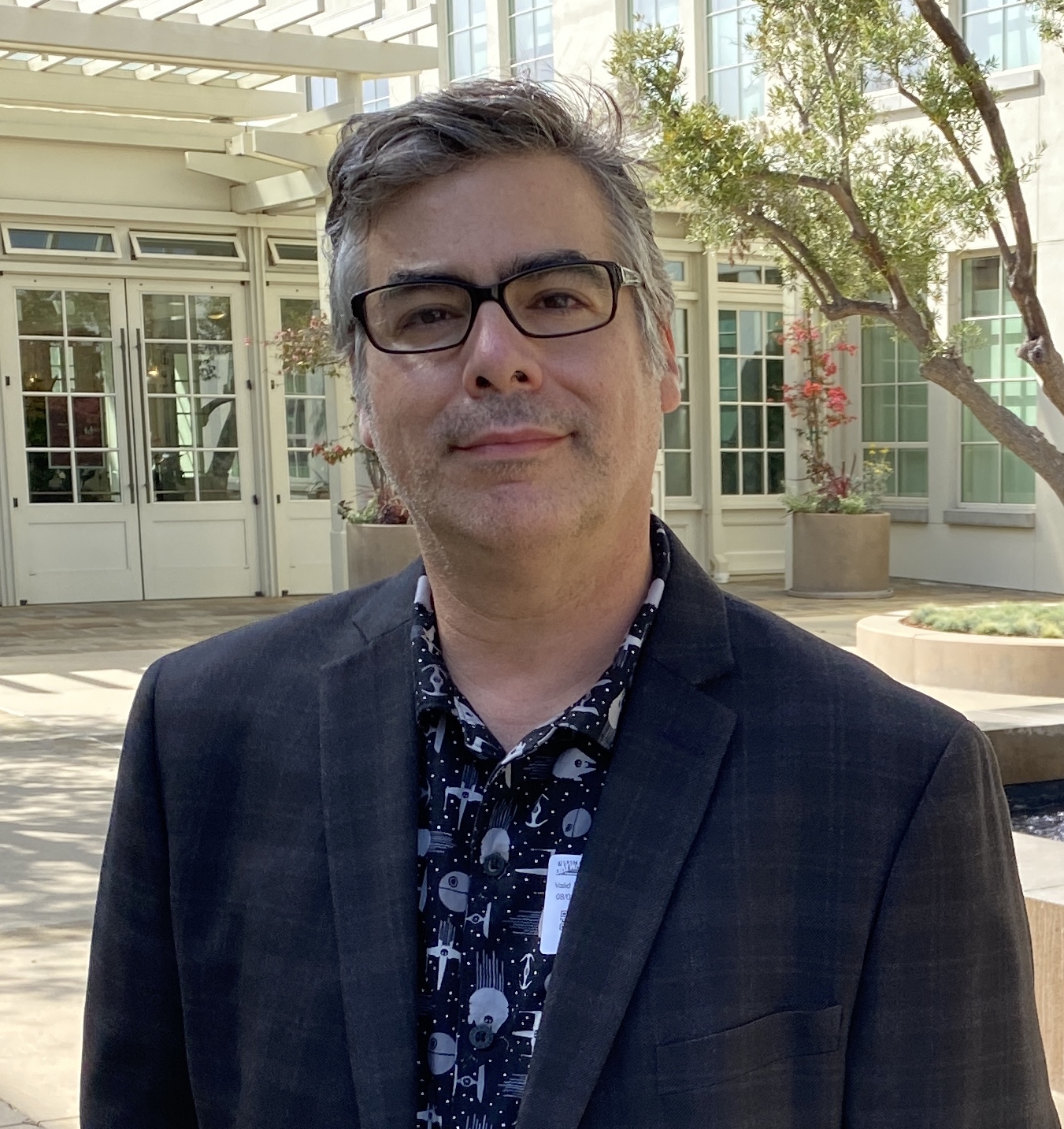
- Education: Ithaca College
- Occupations: Filmmaker; magazine editor; journalist
- Years active: 1990–present

David A. Weiner (/ˈwaɪnər/) is an American filmmaker, magazine editor, and journalist.

He wrote and directed the In Search of Darkness '80s trilogy, which explores the decade of 1980s horror cinema over the course of 14-plus hours: the long-form 2019 documentary film In Search of Darkness, and its sequels In Search of Darkness: Part II (2020) and In Search of Darkness: Part III (2022).

In 2024, he wrote and directed In Search of Darkness: 1990-1994, a six-hour documentary examining early ‘90s horror films and television, followed by a second six-hour documentary, In Search of Darkness: 1995-1999 in 2025.

Weiner also wrote and directed the five-hour 2022 documentary on '80s science fiction film In Search of Tomorrow, and executive produced Aliens Expanded (2024), a four-hour doc featuring new interviews with director James Cameron and the cast & crew of Aliens. He is also executive producer of The Thing Expanded documentary with director John Carpenter and the cast & crew of The Thing.

Weiner was a writer for The Hollywood Reporter's Heat Vision and LA Weekly, and was a senior editor for Entertainment Tonight Online from 2001 to 2014.

He was the executive editor of Famous Monsters of Filmland from 2015 to 2016, which resulted in him winning the Rondo Hatton Award for Best Interview of the Year in 2015 (for his interview with Mel Brooks for the 40th anniversary of Young Frankenstein), as well as winning the award for Best Classic Magazine (for Famous Monsters of Filmland) two years in a row.

After graduating from film school at New York's Ithaca College in 1990, Weiner started his entertainment career in Los Angeles working in various on-set production capacities in film, television, commercials, and music videos. He moved on to film development and script coverage/story analyst jobs, and navigated the dot-com boom and bust in the mid-to-late '90s at AOL's Entertainment Asylum, Scour.com, and Hollywood.com before spending over a decade covering film, television, music, and breaking celebrity news at Entertainment Tonight.

On creating long-form genre documentaries:

“These films are like the nostalgia of a sense memory, or an unexpected song that takes you back to one of the best times in your life. Revisiting, discussing, and celebrating these films in a long-form documentary time-capsule format is one of the greatest ways to keep the spark alive for so many beloved films.”

- David Weiner, Forbes, October 12, 2022

== Selected filmography ==
Year	Title	Notes
1990	Round Numbers	Assistant Director
1991	Samantha	Assistant Director
1991	Puppet Master III: Toulon's Revenge	Production Manager/AD (second unit)
1992	Netherworld	Production Manager/AD (second unit)
1992	Demonic Toys	Locations (as Dave Weiner)
1993	The Hidden II	Production Assistant
1993	Project Vampire	Assistant Director
1994	Desert Winds	Assistant Director
1994	Don't Do It	Assistant Director
1994	Live Wire	Production Assistant
1994	Pentathlon	Production Assistant
1994	Another Midnight Run	Production Assistant
1994	Midnight Runaround	Production Assistant
1994	Midnight Run for Your Life	Production Assistant
2000	Cast Away	Production Assistant
2019	In Search of the Last Action Heroes	Producer
2019	In Search of Darkness	Director, Writer, Producer
2020	In Search of Darkness: Part II	Director, Writer, Producer
2022	In Search of Tomorrow	Director, Writer, Producer
2022	In Search of Darkness: Part III	Director, Writer, Producer
2024	Aliens Expanded	Executive Producer
2024	In Search of Darkness: 1990-1994	Director, Writer, Producer
2025	In Search of Darkness: 1995-1999	Director, Writer, Producer
2026	The Thing Expanded	Executive Producer
TBA	In Search of Tomorrow: Part II	Director, Writer, Producer
