= Gorgon Video =

Film production and distribution company

Gorgon Video is a film production and distribution company focusing on the subgenre of extreme horror and "dark documentaries" based in Spain and the United States. The company is known for the film Devil Doll (1964) and the Faces of Death series. It is an offshoot of MPI Home Video.

== Films ==
- Grip of the Strangler (1958)
- Blood of the Vampire (1958)
- Devil Doll (1964)
- La Sorella di Satana (1966)
- La Horripilante bestia humana (1969)
- La Bestia uccide a sangue freddo (1971)
- El gran amor del conde Drácula (1972)
- Children Shouldn't Play with Dead Things (1972)
- Frankenstein '80 (1972)
- The Forgotten (1973)
- Deathdream (1974)
- Bakterion (1976)
- Faces of Death (1978)
- Il Fiume del grande caimano (1979)
- Des morts (1981)
- Faces of Death II (1981)
- A Night to Dismember (1983)
- Faces of Death III (1985)
- The Worst of Faces of Death (1987)
- Evil Dead Trap (Shiryo no wana) (1988)
- Death Spa (1989)
- Faces of Death IV (1990)
- Shiryo no wana 2: Hideki (1991)
- Faces of Death: Fact or Fiction? (1999)
