= Mother of Flies =

2025 American horror film

- Promotional release poster
- Directed by: John Adams; Toby Poser; Zelda Adams
- Screenplay by: John Adams; Toby Poser; Zelda Adams
- Produced by: Toby Poser
- Starring: John Adams; Toby Poser; Zelda Adams
- Production company: Wonder Wheel Productions
- Distributed by: Shudder
- Release dates: July 24, 2025 (Fantasia Film Festival); January 23, 2026 (United States)
- Running time: 92 minutes
- Country: United States
- Language: English

Mother of Flies is a 2025 horror film featuring Zelda Adams as the cancer-stricken protagonist Mickey, John Adams as her skeptical father Jake, and Toby Poser in the dual roles of Mickey's late mother (in flashbacks) and the reclusive witch Solveig.

== Plot ==
Mickey (Zelda Adams), a young cancer survivor, discovers an inoperable abdominal tumor giving her only six months to live, but she refuses to accept her fate and seeks out Solveig, a mysterious woodland healer she connects with through dreams. Accompanied by her skeptical father Jake (John Adams), Mickey arrives at Solveig's moss-covered home for a three-day ritual. Solveig (Toby Poser) employs unconventional methods like micro-dosing Jake with poisonous herbs, cracking snake eggs on Mickey's abdomen, and transferring a live snake into her mouth via hypnosis.

Solveig speaks in riddles, surrounded by flies as if decaying, and reveals flashes of her tragic past. Centuries ago, villagers brought her a pregnant woman whose stillborn child Solveig revived in exchange for keeping it, but they betrayed her, burned the baby alive, and buried her under stones to prevent resurrection. Now a restless spirit who tricked Death, Solveig selects barren Mickey—whose tumor she likens to forbidden biblical fruit—for her plan, using the serpent symbolism to guide the process.

On the final day, after Jake leaves for a motel and learns from locals that Solveig is a long-dead necromancer, Mickey hallucinates a bloody woman and flees into the woods, but Solveig knocks her out and drags her to her grave site piled with stones. Solveig slits open Mickey's abdomen, extracts the apple-sized tumor, magically molds it into a living infant she cradles as her long-lost child, screams defiance at the villagers' stones, and her soul finds peace before fading.

Jake returns to find Mickey healed with no scar but blood evidence of the surgery; medical tests later confirm the tumor's complete removal. Father and daughter dig up Solveig's grave, uncovering skeletal remains of a mother holding her infant, validating the supernatural events and affirming Mickey's faith in the healing over further scientific scrutiny.

== Cast ==
- John Adams as Jake
- Toby Poser as Solveig
- Zelda Adams as Mickey

== Critical response ==
On the review aggregator website Rotten Tomatoes, 94% of 51 critics' reviews are positive. The website's consensus reads: "Somber and boldly intimate, Mother of Flies is a folk horror chamber piece that infuses its meditation on death with jaw-dropping practical effects and ferocious weirdness." Metacritic, which uses a weighted average, assigned the film a score of 69 out of 100, based on 8 critics, indicating "generally favorable" reviews. Critic and filmmaker Matt Zoller Seitz criticized the film's pacing, but commented that "There isn’t a shot that isn't meticulously created, lovingly fussed over, and suitable for framing", giving the film 2.5 out of 4 stars. Dennis Harvey of Variety wrote: "It's a densely textured, quite gorgeous dive into folkloric witchiness that avoids nearly all anticipated clichés, finally arriving at something not so much terrifying as unexpectedly poignant."
