= MPI Media Group =

American film and home entertainment company

- Type: Private
- Industry: Film; Home video
- Founded: 1976; 50 years ago
- Headquarters: Orland Park, Illinois
- Key people: Malik Ali (president/co-founder)
- Divisions: Watermelon Pictures; Dark Sky Films
- Website: MPI Media Group

MPI Home Video logo from 1999

MPI Media Group is an American producer, distributor and licensor of theatrical film and home entertainment. MPI's subsidiaries include MPI Pictures, MPI Home Video, Gorgon Video, and the horror film distributor Dark Sky Films. The company is located in Orland Park, Illinois, and was founded in 1976 by brothers Malik & Waleed Ali.

MPI also owns the stock footage archive WPA Film Library, which offers one of the industry's largest collections of music performances, newsreels, political coverage and pop culture footage and the British Pathe Newsreel Archive. The company was originally started in 1976 as Maljack Productions, Inc.

The company branched out into video distribution in 1983. One of the first titles, the Beatles' movie A Hard Day's Night, which honored the movie's 20th anniversary was an instant best seller on the Billboard Videocassette Top 40. Maljack had branched out into the vintage TV show genre with The Prisoner serving as one of the first titles to come out of the MPI Home Video label. They eventually became a leader in the vintage television show industry, along with Paramount Home Video.

In 1984, Maljack introduced the Gorgon Video line. In 1985, Maljack released a series of videocassettes featuring the lost episodes of the vintage Jackie Gleason TV show The Honeymooners. Maljack also released shows via licensing agreements with such distributors like ITC Entertainment, as well as Captain Kangaroo. In 1986, Maljack Productions, Inc. (MPI) released the David Selznick-produced Ronald Reagan documentary Reagan's Way, which was originally commissioned for French TV.

Also, in 1986, Doc Projects Inc. had signed a deal with Maljack Productions in order to release its first documentary, Great Crimes of the Century. In 1987, Maljack Productions, Inc. was officially shortened to MPI. In 1987, Frank Zappa's Honker Home Video had signed a distribution deal with MPI in order to release their titles on videocassette.

MPI Home Video is one of the few home media companies that still use the term "Home Video" in its name despite the VHS format ceasing production years ago.

Current MPI Home Video logo

== MPI Home Video releases ==
=== Films ===
- Reagans' Way (1986)
- Dark Shadows: Behind the Scenes (made in 1991 & released in 2001)
- Dark Shadows 30th Anniversary Tribute (made in 1996 & released in 2001)
- Live & Smokin' (2009)
- Catfight (2016)
- Reunion (2020)
- Dark Shadows and Beyond: The Jonathan Frid Story (2021)

=== TV series ===
- A Touch of Frost
- The Adventures of Sherlock Holmes
- The Beverly Hillbillies
- The Big Easy
- The Case-Book of Sherlock Holmes
- Captain Kangaroo
- The Cisco Kid
- Close to You: Remembering The Carpenters
- Dark Shadows
- The Doris Day Show
- The Donna Reed Show
- Family Affair
- The Girls Next Door
- Here's Lucy
- The Color Honeymooners
- The Invisible Man
- The IT Crowd
- Linus the Lionhearted
- My Favorite Martian
- My Living Doll
- Petticoat Junction
- Pulling
- The Rich Little Show
- The Return of Sherlock Holmes
- The Mothers-in-Law
- The Prisoner
- The Vice
- Lucille Ball TV specials
