= Isa Mazzei =

American screenwriter and producer

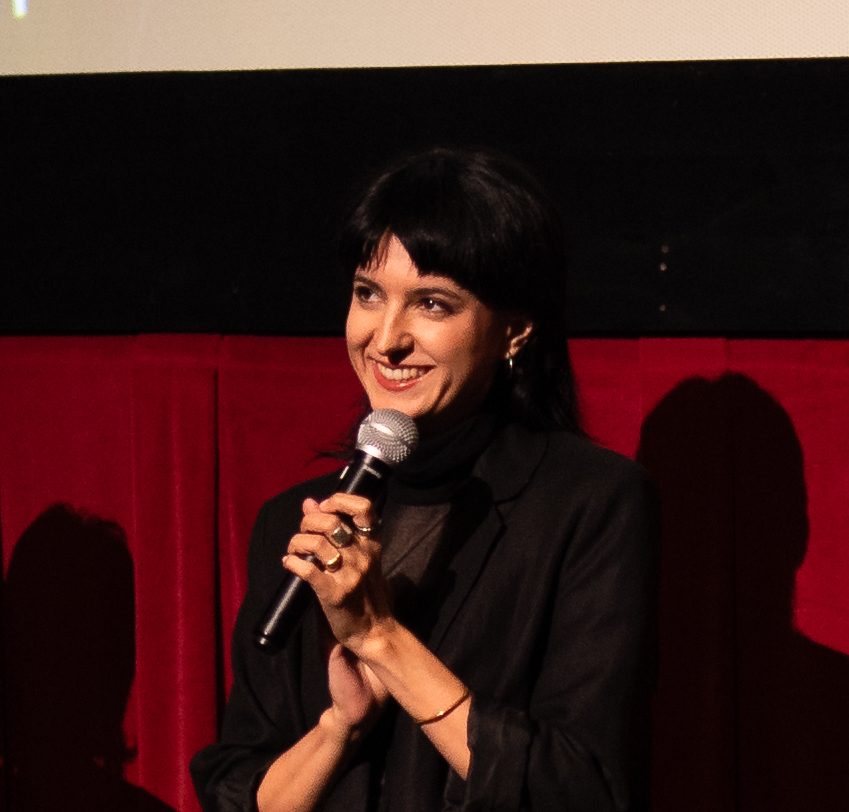
- Mazzei at the Beverly Hills Film Festival 2026
- Born: Santa Monica, California, U.S.
- Education: University of California, Berkeley (BA)
- Occupations: screenwriter, producer, author
- Years active: 2018–present
- Known for: Cam; Faces of Death

Isa Mazzei is an American screenwriter, author, and film producer. She wrote and produced Blumhouse's Cam, a psychological horror film on Netflix starring Madeline Brewer. She is also the author of CAMGIRL, a memoir from Rare Bird Books.

== Early life ==
Mazzei grew up in Boulder, Colorado after spending her early years in California. She is the daughter of a director of photography and a make-up artist. She is a graduate of the University of California, Berkeley, where she received a degree in Comparative Literature in 2013.

== Career ==
Mazzei began writing professionally in 2016 with the screenplay for Cam, loosely based on her own experience as a camgirl. She was awarded Best Screenplay for Cam at the Fantasia International Film Festival in 2018. Her first book, a memoir entitled CAMGIRL, was published in November 2019. Her writing has been featured in New York Magazine's The Cut. In 2019, she co-wrote and produced an episode of 50 States of Fright for Quibi, starring Christina Ricci. She is also acting as an advisor for the Sundance Institute's Co//ab program.

== Filmography ==
=== Film ===
Year	Title	Role
2018	Cam	Screenwriter, producer
2022	How to Blow Up a Pipeline	Producer
2026	Faces of Death	Screenwriter, Producer

=== Television and streaming media ===
Year	Series	Title	Role
2020	50 States of Fright	"Red Rum"	Screenwriter, producer

== Bibliography ==
- CAMGIRL (2019)
