= In Search of Tomorrow =

2022 documentary of 1980s sci-fi films

- Film preview poster
- Directed by: David A. Weiner
- Written by: David A. Weiner
- Produced by: Robin Block; Daniel G. Rego; Derek Maki; James Evans
- Edited by: Samuel Way
- Music by: Weary Pines
- Production company: CreatorVC Studios
- Release date: February 19, 2022 (Los Angeles premiere)
- Running time: 305 minutes
- Country: United Kingdom
- Language: English

In Search of Tomorrow is a 2022 documentary film, written and directed by David A. Weiner. It takes the viewer on a year-by-year deep dive into science fiction films of the 1980s, such as Star Wars (namely The Empire Strikes Back and Return of the Jedi), Star Trek II: The Wrath of Khan, Blade Runner, E.T. the Extra-Terrestrial, Back to the Future, Dune, RoboCop, Aliens, Tron, WarGames, The Terminator, Ghostbusters, Predator, Akira, The Road Warrior, The Abyss, Short Circuit, and several more. The film also examines the science and technology behind the fiction amid insider tales of the creative process.

The documentary features interviews of '80s sci-fi filmmakers, actors, special-effects and visual effects masters, as well as tech advisors, authors, influencers, composers and visionaries.

== Cast ==
- Lance Guest
- Clancy Brown
- Sean Young
- Wil Wheaton
- Catherine Mary Stewart
- John Carpenter
- Adrienne Barbeau
- Paul Verhoeven
- Peter Weller
- Nancy Allen
- Kurtwood Smith
- Jenette Goldstein
- Joe Dante
- Carrie Henn
- Bruce Boxleitner
- Shane Black
- Dee Wallace
- Mark Rolston
- Barry Bostwick
- Ivan Reitman
- Billy Dee Williams
- Ronny Cox
- Bill Duke
- Alex Winter
- Jesse Ventura
- Gene Simmons
- Bob Gale
- John Knoll
- Oliver Harper
- Corey Dee Williams
- Adam Nimoy
- Brad Fiedel
- William Sandell
- Stewart Raffill
- Ed Gale

== Synopsis ==
The documentary follows a year-by-year timeline, where each film segment combine talent from the project and/or experts discussing aspects such as plot, the film's emotional and cultural impact, behind-the-scenes anecdotes, toys, tie-ins and marketing, creative visions influencing contemporary tech/architecture/landscape design.

It also contains interstitial chapters that further explores themes such as:

- Heroes and Heroines: Hear from the actors, writers, directors, and producers who brought sci-fi icons such as Rick Deckard, Ellen Ripley, and the Terminator to movie screens.
- SFX Breakdowns: Learn how robot, creature, and spaceship effects were created. The filmmakers will be interviewing the artists who designed and operated the models, puppets, and animatronics that brought creatures and characters to life.
- Production Design & Worldbuilding: Learn about the creation of the costumes, weapons, and post-apocalyptic landscapes that set the scene for audiences' favorite stories.
- Socio/Political Context: How '80s sci-fi reflected the socio-political context in which it was made: Tech advances, Reaganomics, Live Aid, big business, and the AIDS crisis.
- Genre Mixing: Exploring how other genres - fantasy, action, horror, and comedy - are very much intertwined with the sci-fi genre. Where does one begin and the other end?
- Legacy: Discuss the importance of '80s sci-fi genre in a modern-day context. Why is '80s sci-fi still so relevant today?

== Production ==
Kickstarter and Indiegogo campaigns were launched to raise funds for the film and they were successful.

== Reception ==
Danielle Solzman wrote that the film is "a lengthy but beautiful love letter to this decade."

Anya Couture of Geek Vibes Nation wrote, "Whether fans of sci-fi movies take the documentary head-on for its entire runtime or break it up by its own natural episodic segues, there's something here for every diehard and neophyte to learn and enjoy. It emphasizes there is more to just remember how these films affect us, but that there is always a new perspective that deserves exploration and celebration."

== See also ==
- Science fiction film
