= List of British films of 2018 =

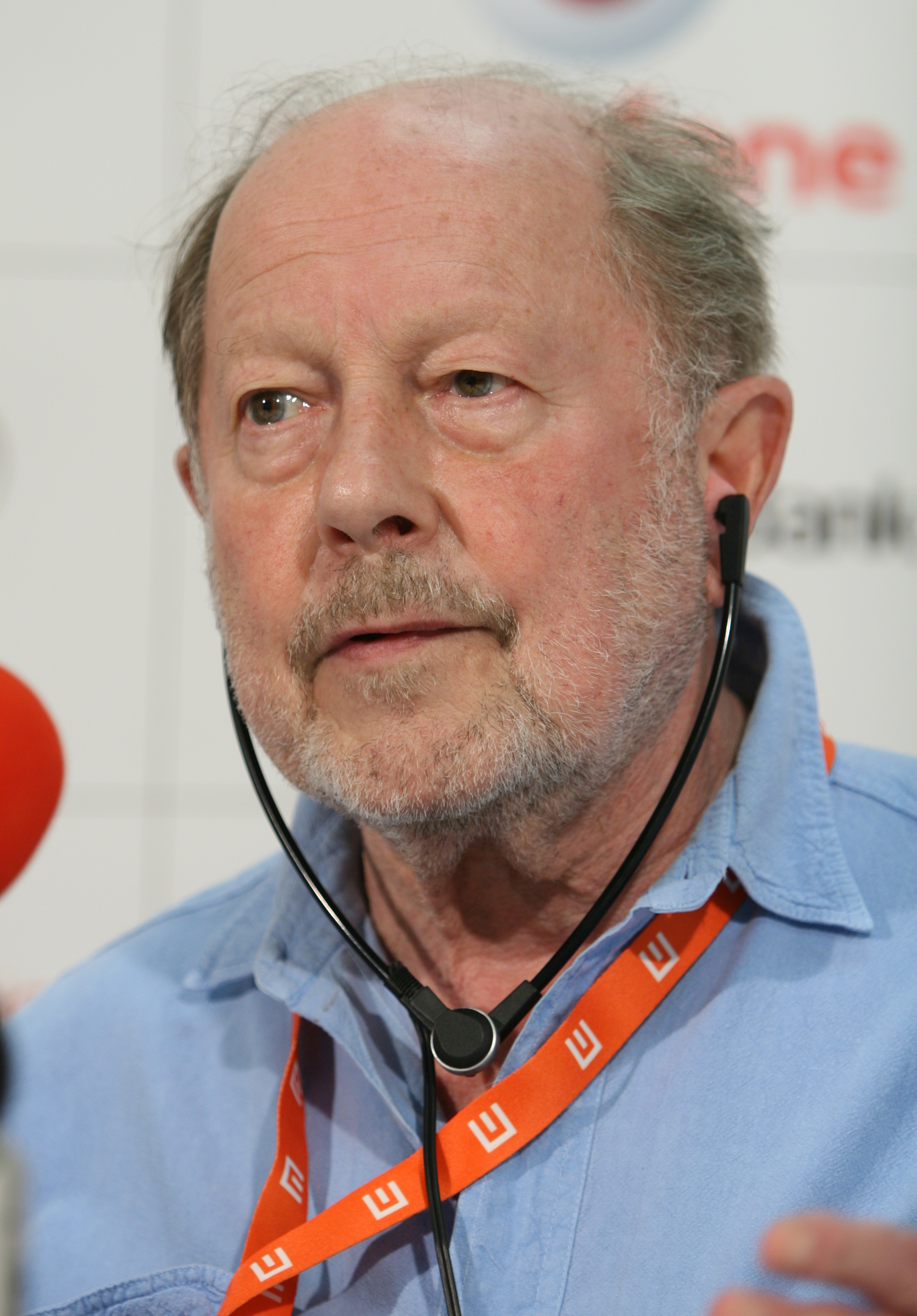
2018 saw the death of Nicolas Roeg, the director of Performance, Don't Look Now and The Witches (1990).

This article lists feature-length British films and full-length documentaries that have had their premieres in 2018 and were at least partly produced by Great Britain or the United Kingdom. It does not feature short films, medium-length films, made-for-TV films, pornographic films, filmed theater, VR films and interactive films like Black Mirror: Bandersnatch. It also does not include films screened in previous years that had official release dates in 2018.

British co-productions like Bohemian Rhapsody, Fantastic Beasts: The Crimes of Grindelwald, and Mamma Mia! Here We Go Again garnered positive reviews and collectively grossed more than $1.5 billion in the Box Office worldwide. Small independent films like The Wife, Three Identical Strangers and At Eternity's Gate performed well in the Specialty Box Office, screening in a limited number of theaters.

2018 was expected to be the best year for British box office since 1971 with Avengers: Infinity War, Mamma Mia! Here We Go Again, Incredibles 2, Black Panther, Bohemian Rhapsody, Jurassic World: Fallen Kingdom, Peter Rabbit and The Greatest Showman breaking £40 million at the British box office.

Also included is an overview of five awards ceremonies which are major events in British film: the Academy Awards, British Academy Film Awards, Critics' Choice Awards, Golden Globe Awards and Screen Actors Guild Awards.

== Film premieres ==
=== January – March ===
| Opening | | Title | Cast and crew | Details | Ref. |
|---|---|---|---|---|---|
| J A N U A R Y | 8 | The Commuter | Director: Jaume Collet-Serra; Cast: Liam Neeson, Vera Farmiga, Patrick Wilson, Jonathan Banks, Elizabeth McGovern, Sam Neill | StudioCanal UK (Co-produced by France and the United States) | |
| J A N U A R Y | 19 | American Animals | Director: Bart Layton; Cast: Evan Peters, Barry Keoghan, Blake Jenner, Jared Abrahamson, Udo Kier, Ann Dowd | STXinternational (Co-produced by the United States) | |
| J A N U A R Y | 19 | Three Identical Strangers | Director: Tim Wardle; Cast: Edward Galland, David Kellman, Robert Shafran | Neon (Co-produced by the United States) | |
| J A N U A R Y | 20 | Colette | Director: Wash Westmoreland; Cast: Keira Knightley, Dominic West, Aiysha Hart, Fiona Shaw, Denise Gough, Robert Pugh, Rebecca Root, Eleanor Tomlinson | Bleecker Street; Based on the life of Colette (Co-produced by Hungary and the United States) | |
| J A N U A R Y | 20 | Early Man | Director: Nick Park; Cast: Eddie Redmayne, Tom Hiddleston, Maisie Williams, Timothy Spall, Ben Whitehead | StudioCanal | |
| J A N U A R Y | 20 | An Evening with Beverly Luff Linn | Director: Jim Hosking; Cast: Aubrey Plaza, Emile Hirsch, Jemaine Clement, Matt Berry, Craig Robinson | Universal Pictures (Co-produced by the United States) | |
| J A N U A R Y | 20 | Yardie | Director: Idris Elba; Cast: Aml Ameen, Stephen Graham, Akin Gazi, Mark Rhino Smith, Fraser James, Naomi Ackie | Based on Yardie by Victor Headley | |
| J A N U A R Y | 21 | The Happy Prince | Director: Rupert Everett; Cast: Rupert Everett, Colin Firth, Colin Morgan, Emily Watson, Tom Wilkinson, Anna Chancellor | Lionsgate UK; Based on the life of Oscar Wilde (Co-produced by Belgium, Germany and Italy) | |
| J A N U A R Y | 21 | Matangi/Maya/M.I.A. | Director: Stephen Loveridge; Cast: M.I.A. | Dogwoof; Based on the life of M.I.A. (Co-produced by Sri Lanka and the United States) | |
| J A N U A R Y | 22 | The Miseducation of Cameron Post | Director: Desiree Akhavan; Cast: Chloë Grace Moretz, Sasha Lane, John Gallagher, Jr., Forrest Goodluck, Jennifer Ehle, Quinn Shephard | Vertigo Releasing; Based on The Miseducation of Cameron Post by Emily M. Danforth (Co-produced by the United States) | |
| J A N U A R Y | 22 | Ophelia | Director: Claire McCarthy; Cast: Daisy Ridley, Naomi Watts, Clive Owen, Tom Felton, George MacKay, Dominic Mafham | GEM Entertainment; Based on Hamlet by William Shakespeare and Ophelia by Lisa Klein (Co-produced by the United States) | |
| J A N U A R Y | 23 | Lords of Chaos | Director: Jonas Åkerlund; Cast: Rory Culkin, Emory Cohen, Anthony De La Torre, Sky Ferreira, Jack Kilmer | Arrow Films; Based on Lords of Chaos by Michael Moynihan and Didrik Søderlind (Co-produced by Norway, Sweden and United States) | |
| J A N U A R Y | 29 | My Friend the Polish Girl | Directors: Ewa Banaszkiewicz, Mateusz Dymek; Cast: Aneta Piotrowska, Emma Friedman-Cohen, Daniel Barry, Andy Abbott | Republic Film Distribution (Co-produced by Poland) | |
| F E B R U A R Y | 3 | Hellraiser: Judgment | Director: Gary J. Tunnicliffe; Cast: Damon Carney, Randy Wayne, Alexandra Harris, Heather Langenkamp, Paul T. Taylor | Lionsgate Home Entertainment | |
| F E B R U A R Y | 8 | Accident Man | Director: Jesse V. Johnson; Cast: Scott Adkins, Ashley Greene, Ray Stevenson, Michael Jai White | Sony Pictures Home Entertainment; Based on Accident Man by Pat Mills and Tony Skinner | |
| F E B R U A R Y | 9 | Winter Ridge | Director: Dom Lenoir; Cast: Matt Hookings, Michael McKell, Olwen Catherine Kelly, Hannah Waddingham, Alan Ford | Phoenix Worldwide Entertainment | |
| F E B R U A R Y | 17 | Profile | Director: Timur Bekmambetov; Cast: Valene Kane, Shazad Latif, Christine Adams, Morgan Watkins | (Co-produced by Cyprus, Russia and the United States) | |
| F E B R U A R Y | 18 | The Real Estate | Director: Axel Petersén and Måns Månsson; Cast: Léonore Ekstrand, Christer Levin, Christian Saldert, Olof Rhodin | Njutafilms (Co-produced by Sweden) | |
| F E B R U A R Y | 19 | Entebbe (a.k.a. 7 Days in Entebbe) | Director: José Padilha; Cast: Rosamund Pike, Daniel Brühl, Eddie Marsan, Ben Schnetzer, Lior Ashkenazi, Denis Ménochet | Entertainment One; Based on the Operation Entebbe (Co-produced by the United States) | |
| F E B R U A R Y | 23 | Annihilation | Director: Alex Garland; Cast: Natalie Portman, Jennifer Jason Leigh, Gina Rodriguez, Tessa Thompson, Tuva Novotny, Oscar Isaac, Benedict Wong, Sonoya Mizuno, David Gyasi | Netflix; Based on Annihilation by Jeff VanderMeer (Co-produced by the United States) | |
| F E B R U A R Y | 23 | Mute | Director: Duncan Jones; Cast: Alexander Skarsgård, Paul Rudd, Justin Theroux, Seyneb Saleh | Netflix (Co-produced by Germany) | |
| F E B R U A R Y | 24 | The Party's Just Beginning | Director: Karen Gillan; Cast: Karen Gillan, Lee Pace, Matthew Beard, Paul Higgins | Mt. Hollywood Films (Co-produced by the United States) | |
| F E B R U A R Y | 26 | Mary Magdalene | Director: Garth Davis; Cast: Rooney Mara, Joaquin Phoenix, Chiwetel Ejiofor, Tahar Rahim | Focus Features; Based on the life of Mary Magdalene (Co-produced by Australia and the United States) | |
| M A R C H | 1 | A Wizard's Tale (a.k.a. Here Comes the Grump) | Director: Andrés Couturier; Cast: Toby Kebbell, Lily Collins, Ian McShane | GFM Films; Based on animated series Here Comes the Grump (Co-produced by Mexico and the United States) | |
| M A R C H | 2 | Tomb Raider | Director: Roar Uthaug; Cast: Alicia Vikander, Dominic West, Walton Goggins, Daniel Wu, Kristin Scott Thomas, Derek Jacobi | Warner Bros. Based on Tomb Raider by Crystal Dynamics (Co-produced by the United States) | |
| M A R C H | 4 | Nae Pasaran | Director: Felipe Bustos Sierra | Debasers Filums; Based on short film Nae Pasaran by Felipe Bustos Sierra (Co-produced by Chile) | |
| M A R C H | 9 | Scott and Sid | Director: Scott Elliott, Sid Sadowskyj; Cast: Tom Blyth, Richard Mason, Charlotte Milchard | Dreamchasers Film Ltd | |
| M A R C H | 9 | Walk like a Panther | Director: Dan Cadan; Cast: Stephen Graham, Jason Flemyng, Julian Sands | 20th Century Fox | |
| M A R C H | 15 | Sherlock Gnomes | Director: John Stevenson; Cast: James McAvoy, Emily Blunt, Chiwetel Ejiofor, Mary J. Blige, Johnny Depp | Paramount Pictures; Sequel to Gnomeo & Juliet (Co-produced by the United States) | |
| M A R C H | 17 | Postcards from London | Director: Steve McLean; Cast: Harris Dickinson, Ben Cura, Jonah Hauser-King, Leonardo Salerni, Raphael Desprez, Leemore Marrett Jr. | Peccadillo Pictures | |
| M A R C H | 24 | Boogie Man | Director: Andy Morahan; Cast: Kush Khanna, Amy Jackson, Aston Merrygold, Jerry-Jane Pears | | |

=== April – June ===
| Opening | | Title | Cast and crew | Details | Ref. |
|---|---|---|---|---|---|
| A P R I L | 5 | White Chamber | Director: Paul Raschid; Cast: Shauna Macdonald, Oded Fehr, Amrita Acharia, Sharon Maughan, Nicholas Farrell | Netflix | |
| A P R I L | 7 | Destination: Dewsbury | Director: Jack Spring; Cast: David J. Keogh, Matt Sheahan, Dan Shelton, Tom Gilling | Showcase Cinemas | |
| A P R I L | 9 | The Guernsey Literary and Potato Peel Pie Society | Director: Mike Newell; Cast: Lily James, Michiel Huisman, Glen Powell, Jessica Brown Findlay, Katherine Parkinson, Matthew Goode, Tom Courtenay, Penelope Wilton | StudioCanal; Based on The Guernsey Literary and Potato Peel Pie Society by Mary Ann Shaffer and Annie Barrows (Co-produced by France) | |
| A P R I L | 13 | 10x10 | Director: Suzi Ewing; Cast: Kelly Reilly, Luke Evans, Olivia Chenery | Vertical Entertainment | |
| A P R I L | 14 | Children of the Snow Land | Directors: Zara Balfour, Marcus Stephenson | Curzon Home Cinema | |
| A P R I L | 19 | Island of the Hungry Ghosts | Director: Gabrielle Brady; Cast:n Poh Lin Lee | Autlook Filmsales | |
| A P R I L | 21 | The Dig | Directors: Andy Tohill and Ryan Tohill; Cast: Moe Dunford, Francis Magee, Emily Taaffe, Lorcan Cranitch | XYZ Films (Co-produced by Ireland) | |
| A P R I L | 22 | McQueen | Directors: Ian Bonhôte and Peter Ettedgui | Lionsgate UK; Based on the life and career of Alexander McQueen | |
| A P R I L | 28 | London Unplugged | Directors: Layke Anderson, Natalia Casali, Nick Cohen, Mitchell Crawford, Andreas Heger-Bratterud, Ben Jacobson, Rosanna Lowe, Gaelle Mourre, Kaki Wong; Cast: Juliet Stevenson, Poppy Miller, Imogen Stubbs, Ivanno Jeremiah, Ricky Nixon, Bruce Payne | Munro Films | |
| M A Y | 2 | Nothing Like a Dame (a.k.a. Tea With the Dames) | Director: Roger Michell; Cast: Eileen Atkins, Judi Dench, Joan Plowright, Maggie Smith | Picturehouse | |
| M A Y | 4 | Anon | Director: Andrew Niccol; Cast: Clive Owen, Amanda Seyfried, Colm Feore, Mark O'Brien, Sonya Walger, Joe Pingue, Iddo Goldberg | Altitude Film Distribution | |
| M A Y | 4 | The Con Is On | Director: James Oakley; Cast: Uma Thurman, Tim Roth, Maggie Q, Alice Eve, Sofía Vergara, Parker Posey, Stephen Fry, Crispin Glover | Lionsgate (Co-produced by Canada and the United States) | |
| M A Y | 10 | Cold War | Director: Paweł Pawlikowski; Cast: Tomasz Kot, Joanna Kulig, Agata Kulesza, Jeanne Balibar, Cédric Kahn, Adam Woronowicz | Curzon Artificial Eye (Co-produced by France and Poland) | |
| M A Y | 11 | The Last Witness | Directors: Piotr Szkopiak; Cast: Alex Pettyfer, Robert Więckiewicz, Talulah Riley, Michael Gambon, Will Thorp, Henry Lloyd-Hughes, Gwilym Lee | Momentum Pictures (Co-produced by Poland) | |
| M A Y | 11 | Terminal | Directors: Vaughn Stein; Cast: Margot Robbie, Simon Pegg, Dexter Fletcher, Mike Myers, Max Irons | Arrow Films (Co-produced by Hong Kong, Hungary, Ireland, and the United States) | |
| M A Y | 16 | Whitney | Directors: Kevin Macdonald | Altitude Film Distribution; Based on the life of Whitney Houston (Co-produced by the United States) | |
| M A Y | 19 | The Man Who Killed Don Quixote | Directors: Terry Gilliam; Cast: Adam Driver, Jonathan Pryce, Stellan Skarsgård, Olga Kurylenko, Joana Ribeiro | Amazon Studios; Loosely based on Don Quixote by Miguel de Cervantes (Co-produced by Belgium, France, Portugal, and Spain) | |
| M A Y | 25 | Welcome to Curiosity | Directors: Anthony Byrne; Cast: Amrita Acharia, Jack Ashton, Richard Blackwood, Kacey Clarke, Brian Croucher, Gary Grant, Cristian Solimeno | Salt Film Releasing | |
| M A Y | 23 | In Darkness | Directors: Anthony Byrne; Cast: Natalie Dormer, Emily Ratajkowski, Ed Skrein, Joely Richardson, Neil Maskell, James Cosmo | Shear Entertainment (Co-produced by the United States) | |
| J U N E | 5 | Captain Morten and the Spider Queen | Director: Kaspar Jancis | | |
| J U N E | 7 | Swimming with Men | Director: Oliver Parker; Cast: Rob Brydon, Jane Horrocks, Rupert Graves, Daniel Mays, Adeel Akhtar, Thomas Turgoose, Jim Carter, Charlotte Riley | GEM Entertainment | |
| J U N E | 8 | Hotel Artemis | Director: Drew Pearce; Cast: Jodie Foster, Sterling K. Brown, Sofia Boutella, Jeff Goldblum, Brian Tyree Henry, Zachary, Dave Bautista, Charlie Day, Jenny Slate | Lionsgate Films (Co-produced by the United States) | |
| J U N E | 12 | Chuck Steel: Night of the Trampires | Director: Mike Mort; Cast: Mike Mort, Jennifer Saunders, Paul Whitehouse, Dan Russel, Jonnie Fiori, Samantha Coughlan | | |
| J U N E | 21 | Eaten by Lions | Director: Jason Wingard; Cast: Antonio Aakeel, Jack Carroll, Asim Chaudhry, Johnny Vegas, Vicki Pepperdine, Kevin Eldon | Wingarm; Based on Going to Mecca by Jason Wingard | |
| J U N E | 22 | Calibre | Director: Matt Palmer; Cast: Jack Lowden, Martin McCann, Tony Curran | Netflix | |
| J U N E | 23 | Postcards from the 48% | Director: David Wilkinson | Guerrilla Films | |
| J U N E | 25 | Possum | Director: Matthew Holness; Cast: Sean Harris, Alun Armstrong, Simon Bubb, Andy Blithe, Pamela Cook | Dark Sky Films; Based on Possum by Matthew Holness | |
| J U N E | 27 | Dead in a Week or Your Money Back | Director: Tom Edmunds; Cast: Tom Wilkinson, Aneurin Barnard, Freya Mavor, Christopher Eccleston, Marion Bailey | Altitude Film Sales | |
| J U N E | 28 | Patrick | Director: Mandie Fletcher; Cast: Beattie Edmondson, Ed Skrein, Tom Bennett, Emily Atack, Jennifer Saunders | Buena Vista International | |
| J U N E | 28 | Songbird | Director: Jamie Adams; Cast: Cobie Smulders, Richard Elis, Jessica Hynes | | |

=== July – September ===
| Opening | | Title | Cast and crew | Details | Ref. |
|---|---|---|---|---|---|
| J U L Y | 18 | Mamma Mia! Here We Go Again | Director: Ol Parker; Cast:Christine Baranski, Pierce Brosnan, Dominic Cooper, Colin Firth, Andy García, Lily James, Amanda Seyfried, Stellan Skarsgård, Julie Walters, Cher, Meryl Streep | Universal Pictures; Sequel to Mamma Mia! (Co-produced by the United States) | |
| A U G U S T | 5 | Ray & Liz | Director: Richard Billingham; Cast: Michelle Bonnard, Deirdre Kelly, Ella Smith, Tony Way | New Wave Films | |
| A U G U S T | 9 | Hurricane (a.k.a. Mission of Honor) | Director: David Blair; Cast: Iwan Rheon, Milo Gibson, Stefanie Martini, Marcin Dorociński, Kryštof Hádek, Christopher Jaciow | Kaleidoscope Film Distribution; Based on the experiences of the 303 RAF Squadron in Battle of Britain (Co-produced by Poland) | |
| A U G U S T | 14 | The Festival | Director: Iain Morris; Cast: Joe Thomas, Hammed Animashaun, Claudia O'Doherty, Emma Rigby, Jemaine Clement | Vertical Entertainment (Co-produced by the United States) | |
| A U G U S T | 14 | Patient Zero | Director: Stefan Ruzowitzky; Cast: Matt Smith, Natalie Dormer, Clive Standon, Agyness Deyn, Stanley Tucci | Vertical Entertainment (Co-produced by the United States) | |
| A U G U S T | 23 | Blue Iguana | Directors: Hadi Hajaig; Cast: Sam Rockwell, Ben Schwartz, Phoebe Fox, Amanda Donohoe, Simon Callow, Peter Ferdinando | Signature Entertainment | |
| A U G U S T | 25 | The Convent (a.k.a. Heretiks) | Director: Paul Hyett; Cast: Michael Ironside, Rosie Day, Hannah Arterton | Thunderbird Releasing | |
| A U G U S T | 30 | The Aspern Papers | Director: Julien Landais; Cast: Jonathan Rhys-Meyers, Joely Richardson, Vanessa Redgrave | Based on The Aspern Papers by Henry James (Co-produced by Germany) | |
| A U G U S T | 30 | The Favourite | Director: Yorgos Lanthimos; Cast: Olivia Colman, Rachel Weisz, Emma Stone, Nicholas Hoult | Universal Pictures; Based on the life of Queen Anne (Co-produced by Ireland and the United States) | |
| A U G U S T | 30 | The Little Stranger | Directors: Lenny Abrahamson; Cast: Domhnall Gleeson, Ruth Wilson, Will Poulter, Charlotte Rampling, Alison Pargeter | Pathé; Based on The Little Stranger by Sarah Waters (Co-produced by France) | |
| A U G U S T | 31 | The White Crow | Director: Ralph Fiennes; Cast: Oleg Ivanko, Adèle Exarchopoulos, Chulpan Khamatova, Ralph Fiennes, Aleksey Morozov, Raphaël Personnaz, Olivier Rabourdin, Ravshana Kurkova, Louis Hofmann, Sergei Polunin | Sony Pictures Classics; Based on the life of Rudolf Nureyev | |
| S E P T E M B E R | 1 | Peterloo | Director: Mike Leigh; Cast: David Bamber, Alastair Mackenzie, James Dangerfield, Eileen Davies, Liam Gerrard, Bronwyn James, Rory Kinnear, Nico Mirallegro, Maxine Peake | Entertainment One; Based on the Peterloo Massacre | |
| S E P T E M B E R | 5 | American Dharma | Director: Errol Morris | Based on the career of Steve Bannon (Co-produced by United States) | |
| S E P T E M B E R | 5 | At Eternity's Gate | Director: Julian Schnabel; Cast: Willem Dafoe, Rupert Friend, Oscar Isaac, Mads Mikkelsen, Mathieu Amalric, Emmanuelle Seigneur, Niels Arestrup | Curzon Artificial Eye; Based on the life of Vincent van Gogh (Co-produced by France and United States) | |
| S E P T E M B E R | 6 | Maiden | Director: Alex Holmes | Based on Tracy Edwards; 1989–1990 Whitbread Round the World Race | |
| S E P T E M B E R | 6 | Outlaw King | Director: David Mackenzie; Cast: Chris Pine, Aaron Taylor-Johnson, Florence Pugh, Billy Howle, Tony Curran, Stephen Dillane | Netflix; Based on the life of Robert the Bruce (Co-produced by the United States) | |
| S E P T E M B E R | 7 | Final Score | Director: Scott Mann; Cast: Dave Bautista, Pierce Brosnan, Ray Stevenson, Julian Cheung | Signature Entertainment | |
| S E P T E M B E R | 7 | Gwen | Director: William McGregor; Cast: Eleanor Worthington Cox, Maxine Peake, Richard Harrington, Mark Lewis Jones, Kobna Holdbrook-Smith | Bulldog Film Distribution | |
| S E P T E M B E R | 7 | Out of Blue | Director: Carol Morley; Cast: Patricia Clarkson, Toby Jones, Jacki Weaver, James Caan | Based on Night Train by Martin Amis (Co-produced United States) | |
| S E P T E M B E R | 7 | Red Joan | Director: Trevor Nunn; Cast: Judi Dench, Sophie Cookson, Tom Hughes, Tereza Srbova | Lionsgate; Based loosely on the life of Melita Norwood | |
| S E P T E M B E R | 7 | Redcon-1 | Director: Chee Keong Cheung; Cast: Katarina Waters, Mark Strange, Carlos Gallardo, Akira Koieyama, Oris Erhuero | Eagle Films | |
| S E P T E M B E R | 7 | Teen Spirit | Director: Max Minghella; Cast: Elle Fanning, Rebecca Hall, Zlatko Buric | Lionsgate (Co-produced by the United States) | |
| S E P T E M B E R | 8 | Driven | Director: Nick Hamm; Cast: Lee Pace, Judy Greer, Erin Moriarty, Jason Sudeikis, Corey Stoll, Iddo Goldberg, Justin Bartha, Michael Cudlitz, Tara Summers | Embankment Films | |
| S E P T E M B E R | 8 | Farming | Director: Adewale Akinnuoye-Agbaje; Cast: Damson Idris, Kate Beckinsale, John Dagleish, Gugu Mbatha-Raw, Jamie Winstone, Genevieve Nnaji | GEM Entertainment | |
| S E P T E M B E R | 8 | Freedom Fields | Director: Naziha Arebi | (Co-produced by Libya) | |
| S E P T E M B E R | 8 | The Wedding Guest | Directors: Michael Winterbottom; Cast: Dev Patel, Radhika Apte, Jim Sarbh | Sony Pictures | |
| S E P T E M B E R | 8 | Widows | Directors: Steve McQueen; Cast: Viola Davis, Cynthia Erivo, André Holland, Elizabeth Debicki, Michelle Rodriguez, Daniel Kaluuya, Liam Neeson, Colin Farrell, Robert Duvall, Carrie Coon | 20th Century Fox; Based on Widows by Lynda La Plante (Co-produced by the United States) | |
| S E P T E M B E R | 9 | American Woman | Director: Jake Scott; Cast: Sienna Miller, Christina Hendricks, Aaron Paul, Will Sasso, Pat Healy, Amy Madigan | Signature Entertainment (Co-produced by United States) | |
| S E P T E M B E R | 9 | High Life | Director: Claire Denis; Cast: Robert Pattinson, Mia Goth, Juliette Binoche | Thunderbird Releasing (Co-produced by France and Germany) | |
| S E P T E M B E R | 9 | Tell It to the Bees | Director: Annabel Jankel; Cast: Anna Paquin, Holliday Grainger, Emun Elliott, Kate Dickie | Based on Tell It to the Bees by Fiona Shaw | |
| S E P T E M B E R | 9 | Where Hands Touch | Director: Amma Asante; Cast: Amandla Stenberg, George MacKay, Abbie Cornish, Christopher Eccleston | Vertical Entertainment | |
| S E P T E M B E R | 10 | The Death & Life of John F. Donovan | Director: Xavier Dolan; Cast: Kit Harington, Natalie Portman, Susan Sarandon, Kathy Bates, Ben Schnetzer, Jacob Tremblay, Thandie Newton, Amara Karan, Chris Zylka, Jared Keeso, Emily Hampshire, Michael Gambon | (Co-produced by Canada) | |
| S E P T E M B E R | 10 | JT LeRoy | Director: Justin Kelly; Cast: Laura Dern, Kristen Stewart, Diane Kruger, Jim Sturgess, Kelvin Harrison Jr., Courtney Love | Signature Entertainment; Based on Girl Boy Girl: How I Became JT Leroy by Savannah Knoop (Co-produced by Canada and United States) | |
| S E P T E M B E R | 11 | Vita and Virginia | Directors: Chanya Button; Cast: Gemma Arterton, Elizabeth Debicki, Isabella Rossellini, Rupert Penry-Jones, Peter Ferdinando | Thunderbird Releasing; Based on the life of Virginia Woolf (Co-produced by Ireland) | |
| S E P T E M B E R | 13 | In Fabric | Director: Peter Strickland; Cast: Marianne Jean-Baptiste, Hayley Squires, Leo Bill, Gwendoline Christie, Richard Bremmer, Steve Oram, Julian Barratt, Sidse Babett Knudsen, Caroline Catz | Curzon Artificial Eye | |
| S E P T E M B E R | 14 | Johnny English Strikes Again | Director: David Kerr; Cast: Rowan Atkinson, Olga Kurylenko, Ben Miller, Jake Lacy, Miranda Hennessy | Universal Pictures; Sequel to Johnny English Reborn (Co-produced by France and the United States) | |
| S E P T E M B E R | 14 | King of Thieves | Director: James Marsh; Cast: Michael Caine, Charlie Cox, Michael Gambon, Tom Courtenay, Jim Broadbent, Kellie Shirley, Terri Robinson, Ray Winstone | StudioCanal; Based on the Hatton Garden safe deposit burglary | |
| S E P T E M B E R | 20 | London Fields | Director: Mathew Cullen; Cast: Billy Bob Thornton, Amber Heard, Jim Sturgess, Theo James, Jason Isaacs, Cara Delevingne | Batrax Entertainment; Based on London Fields by Martin Amis (Co-produced by the United States) | |
| S E P T E M B E R | 21 | Apostle | Director: Gareth Evans; Cast: Dan Stevens, Lucy Boynton, Mark Lewis Jones, Bill Milner, Kristine Froseth, Paaul Higgins, Michael Sheen | Netflix (Co-produced by the United States) | |
| S E P T E M B E R | 22 | Bros: After the Screaming Stops | Director: Joe Pearlman, David Soutar; Cast: Matt Goss, Luke Goss | Lorton Entertainment | |

=== October – December ===
| Opening | | Title | Cast and crew | Details | Ref. |
|---|---|---|---|---|---|
| O C T O B E R | 1 | The Keeper | Director: Marcus H. Rosenmüller; Cast: David Kross, Freya Mavor | SquareOne (Germany); Based on the life of Bert Trautmann (Co-produced by Germany) | |
| O C T O B E R | 5 | Malevolent | Director: Olaf de Fleur Johannesson; Cast: Florence Pugh, Celia Imrie, Ben Lloyd-Hughes | Netflix | |
| O C T O B E R | 5 | Strangeways Here We Come | Director: Chris Green; Cast: Elaine Cassidy, Michelle Keegan, Lauren Socha, Chanel Cresswell | Screenbound Pictures | |
| O C T O B E R | 11 | Evelyn | Director: Orlando von Einsiedel; Cast: | Netflix | |
| O C T O B E R | 11 | Happy New Year, Colin Burstead | Director: Ben Wheatley; Cast: Neil Maskell, Joe Cole, Charles Dance, Sam Riley, Hayley Squires, Doon Mackichan, Sinead Matthews, Asim Chaudhry | BBC | |
| O C T O B E R | 11 | Keepers (a.k.a. The Vanishing) | Director: Kristoffer Nyholm; Cast: Gerard Butler, Peter Mullan, Olafur Darri Olafsson, Connor Swindells | Lionsgate | |
| O C T O B E R | 12 | Been So Long | Director: Tinge Krishnan; Cast: Michaela Coel, Arinzé Kene, George MacKay, Joe Dempsie, Luke Norris, Arsher Ali, Rakie Ayola, Ashley Thomas | Netflix; Based on Been So Long by Arthur Darvill and Ché Walker | |
| O C T O B E R | 12 | Sometimes Always Never | Director: Carl Hunter; Cast: Bill Nighy, Sam Riley, Alice Lowe, Jenny Agutter, Tim McInnerny | Parkland Entertainment | |
| O C T O B E R | 13 | Scarborough | Director: Barnaby Southcombe; Cast: Jessica Barden, Jordan Bolger, Edward Hogg, Jodhi May | Kaleidoscope Entertainment | |
| O C T O B E R | 16 | They Shall Not Grow Old | Director: Peter Jackson | Trafalgar Releasing; Based on the events of World War I | |
| O C T O B E R | 17 | The Fight | Director: Jessica Hynes; Cast: Jessica Hynes, Russell Brand, Anita Dobson, Rhona Mitra, Christopher Fairbank, Sennia Nanua, Alice Lowe, Sally Phillips, Liv Hill | | |
| O C T O B E R | 19 | Benjamin | Director: Simon Amstell; Cast: Colin Morgan, Anna Chancellor, Phénix Brossard, Jack Rowan, Jessica Raine | | |
| O C T O B E R | 19 | Only You | Director: Harry Wootliff; Cast: Laia Costa, Josh O'Connor | Curzon Artificial Eye (Co-produced by Sweden) | |
| O C T O B E R | 19 | Tomorrow | Director: Martha Pinson; Cast: Sebastian Street, Stuart Brennan, Stephen Fry, Sophie Kennedy Clark, James Cosmo, Paul Kaye, Stephanie Leonidas, Joss Stone | Stronghold | |
| O C T O B E R | 21 | Stan & Ollie | Director: Jon S. Baird; Cast: Steve Coogan, John C. Reilly, Shirley Henderson, Nina Arianda, Danny Huston | EOne Entertainment; Based on the lives of Laurel and Hardy (Co-produced by Canada and the United States) | |
| O C T O B E R | 24 | Bohemian Rhapsody | Directors: Bryan Singer, Dexter Fletcher; Cast: Rami Malek, Lucy Boynton, Ben Hardy, Gwilym Lee, Joseph Mazzello, Aidan Gillen, Tom Hollander, Mike Myers | 20th Century Fox; Based on the life of Freddie Mercury (Co-produced by the United States) | |
| O C T O B E R | 24 | The Girl in the Spider's Web | Director: Fede Álvarez; Cast: Claire Foy, Sverrir Gudnason, LaKeith Stanfield, Sylvia Hoeks, Stephen Merchant, Vicky Krieps | Sony Pictures Releasing; Based on The Girl in the Spider's Web by David Lagercrantz (Co-produced by Canada, Germany, Sweden, and the United States) | |
| O C T O B E R | 31 | Slaughterhouse Rulez | Director: Crispian Mills; Cast: Simon Pegg, Asa Butterfield, Nick Frost, Michael Sheen, Finn Cole, Hermione Corfield | Sony Pictures Releasing | |
| N O V E M B E R | 4 | Kill Ben Lyk | Directors: Erwan Marinopoulos; Cast: Eugene Simon, Simone Ashley, Dimitri Leonidas, Bronson Webb | Artist Rights Distribution (Co-produced by France) | |
| N O V E M B E R | 8 | Fantastic Beasts: The Crimes of Grindelwald | Directors: David Yates; Cast: Eddie Redmayne, Katherine Waterston, Dan Fogler, Alison Sudol, Ezra Miller, Johnny Depp, Jude Law, Zoë Kravitz, Callum Turner, Claudia Kim | Warner Bros. Pictures; Sequel to Fantastic Beasts and Where to Find Them (Co-produced by the United States) | |
| N O V E M B E R | 14 | Coldplay: A Head Full of Dreams | Director: Mat Whitecross | Trafalgar Releasing; Based on the career of Coldplay | |
| N O V E M B E R | 14 | Pond Life | Directors: Bill Buckhurst; Cast: Tom Varey, Esmé Creed-Miles, Angus Imrie, Daisy Edgar-Jones, Abraham Lewis, Ethan Wilkie, Gianluca Gallucci | | |
| N O V E M B E R | 15 | Mary Queen of Scots | Director: Josie Rourke; Cast: Saoirse Ronan, Margot Robbie, David Tennant, Jack Lowden, Martin Compston, Joe Alwyn, Brendan Coyle, Guy Pearce | Universal Pictures; Based on Queen of Scots: The True Life of Mary Stuart by John Guy (Co-produced by the United States) | |
| N O V E M B E R | 23 | Nativity Rocks! | Director: Debbie Isitt; Cast: Simon Lipkin, Celia Imrie, Craig Revel Horwood, Helen George, Ruth Jones | Entertainment One; Nativity film series | |
| N O V E M B E R | 25 | Mowgli: Legend of the Jungle | Director: Andy Serkis; Cast: Rohan Chand, Matthew Rhys, Freida Pinto, Christian Bale, Cate Blanchett, Benedict Cumberbatch, Naomie Harris, Andy Serkis | Netflix; Based on All the Mowgli Stories by Rudyard Kipling (Co-produced by the United States) | |
| D E C E M B E R | 21 | All Is True | Director: Kenneth Branagh; Cast: Kenneth Branagh, Judi Dench, Ian McKellen | Sony Pictures Classics; Loosely based on the life of William Shakespeare | |

=== Other premieres ===
| Title | Director(s) | Release Date | Ref. |
|---|---|---|---|
| Adrift in Soho | Pablo Behrens | 14 November 2018 | |
| Amá | Lorna Tucker | 1 June 2018 | |
| Aquarela | Viktor Kossakovsky | 1 September 2018 (Venice Film Festival) | |
| Astral | Chris Mul | 13 October 2018 (San Diego International Film Festival) | |
| Await Further Instructions | Johnny Kevorkian | 22 June 2018 (Cinepocalypse) | |
| Becoming Animal | Emma Davie, Peter Mettler | 20 March 2018 (CPH:DOX) | |
| Back to Berlin | Catherine Lurie | 5 May 2018 (Washington Jewish Film Festival) | |
| The Ballymurphy Precedent | Callum Macrae | 11 June 2018 (Sheffield Doc/Fest) | |
| Bare Knuckle | Duncan Napier-Bell | 4 June 2018 | |
| Being Frank: The Chris Sievey Story | Steve Sullivan | 13 March 2018 (South by Southwest Film Festival) | |
| Black Flowers | Martin Gooch | 7 October 2018 (Sitges Film Festival) | |
| Black Site | Tom Paton | 27 August 2018 (Frightfest) | |
| Breaking Habits | Robert Ryan | 15 October 2018 (Warsaw Film Festival) | |
| Bride of Scarecrow | Louisa Warren | 3 October 2018 | |
| Cleft Lip | Erik Knudsen | 13 July 2018 | |
| Curse of the Scarecrow | Louisa Warren | 22 October 2018 | |
| Dagenham | Jo Morris | 13 October 2018 (LA Femme Film Festival) | |
| A Dark Place (a.k.a. Steel Country) | Simon Fellows | 24 June 2018 (Edinburgh International Film Festival) | |
| A Deal with the Universe | Jason Barker | 26 March 2018 (BFI Flare London LGBT Film Festival) | |
| Degas: Passion for Perfection | David Bickerstaff | 6 November 2018 | |
| The Devil's Doorway | Aislinn Clarke | 25 May 2018 (Seattle International Film Festival) | |
| Dirty Work | Louisa Warren | 3 February 2018 | |
| Doozy | Richard Squires | 13 October 2018 (London Film Festival) | |
| The Eyes of Orson Welles | Mark Cousins | 9 May 2018 (Cannes Film Festival) | |
| Featherweight | Simon Stolland, Olivia Warren | 1 May 2018 | |
| Female Human Animal | Josh Appignanesi | 19 April 2018 (Buenos Aires International Festival of Independent Cinema) | |
| A Fistful of Lead | Marc Price | December 2018 | |
| Five Men and Caravaggio | Xiaolu Guo | 21 May 2018 (Tel Aviv International Documentary Film Festival) | |
| The Gandhi Murder | Karim Traïdia, Pankaj Sehgal | 28 June 2018 | |
| H is for Harry | Edward Owles, Jaime Taylor | 6 September 2018 (Open City Documentary Festival) | |
| I Love My Mum | Alberto Sciamma | 27 October 2018 (Cambridge Film Festival) | |
| The Ice King | James Erskine | 23 February 2018 | |
| The Image You Missed | Donal Foreman | 28 January 2018 (International Film Festival Rotterdam) | |
| Into the Mirror | Lois Stevenson | 25 August 2018 (New Renaissance Film Festival) | |
| Irene's Ghost | Iain Cunningham | 13 October 2018 (BFI London Film Festival) | |
| The Isle | Matthew Butler-Hart | 3 March 2018 (Manchester Film Festival) | |
| Jellyfish | James Gardner | 20 April 2018 (Tribeca Film Festival) | |
| Kaiser: The Greatest Footballer Never to Play Football | Louis Myles | 21 April 2018 | |
| King of Crime | Matt Gambell | 2 November 2018 | |
| Last Breath | Richard da Costa, Alex Parkinson | 1 December 2018 | |
| Last Summer | Jon Jones | 29 September 2018 (Vancouver International Film Festival) | |
| Looking for Lennon | Roger Appleton | 4 May 2018 | |
| Lucid | Adam Morse | 23 June 2018 (Edinburgh International Film Festival) | |
| Mad World (a.k.a. Dystopia) | Paul Tanter | 2 January 2018 (DVD premiere) | |
| Magic Medicine | Monty Wates | 1 July 2018 | |
| Make Me Up | Rachel Maclean | 12 October 2018 (London Film Festival) | |
| Make Us Dream | Sam Blair | 15 November 2018 | |
| Mari | Georgia Parris | 18 October 2018 (London Film Festival) | |
| Matriarchy | Scott Vickers | 2 November 2018 | |
| McKellen: Play the Part | Joe Stephenson | 1 June 2018 | |
| Message Man | Corey Pearson | 8 March 2018 (limited) | |
| The More You Ignore Me | Keith English | 6 July 2018 | |
| No Ifs or Buts | Sarah Lewis | 20 October 2018 (London Film Festival) | |
| No Shade | Clare Anyiam-Osigwe | 5 June 2018 | |
| A Northern Soul | Sean McAllister | 7 June 2018 (Sheffield Doc/Fest) | |
| Nureyev: An Orgy of One (a.k.a. Nureyev) | David Morris, Jacqui Morris | 25 September 2018 | |
| Obey | Jamie Jones | 22 April 2018 (Tribeca Film Festival) | |
| Of Fish and Foe | Andy Heathcote | 28 April 2018 (Hot Docs Toronto) | |
| Old Boys | Toby Macdonald | 21 June 2018 (Edinburgh International Film Festival) | |
| One Man's Madness | Jeff Baynes | 22 May 2018 | |
| Payne & Redemption | Fergle Gibson | 4 October 2018 | |
| Peripheral | Paul Hyett | 31 October 2018 (Trieste Science+Fiction Festival) | |
| Pistorius | Vaughan Sivell | 6 September 2018 | |
| That Plan Came from the Bottom Up | Steve Sprung | 14 October 2018 (London Film Festival) | |
| The Ponds | Patrick McLennan, Samuel Smith | 22 June 2018 | |
| The Redeeming | Brian Barnes | 28 January 2018 (Horror-on-Sea Film Festival) | |
| Robin Hood: The Rebellion | Nicholas Winter | 5 November 2018 | |
| Rudeboy: The Story of Trojan Records | Nicolas Jack Davies | 16 November 2018 (Amsterdam International Documentary Film Festival) | |
| Scheme Birds | Ellen Fiske, Ellinor Hallin | 1 December 2018 (Sweden) | |
| The School in the Cloud | Jerry Rothwell, Ranu Ghosh | 20 March 2018 (CPH: Dox) | |
| Scotch: The Golden Dram | Andrew Peat | 14 April 2018 (Buenos Aires International Festival of Independent Cinema) | |
| Shut Up and Play the Piano | Philipp Jedicke | 18 February 2018 (Berlin International Film Festival) | |
| Sink | Mark Gillis | 5 October 2018 (premiere) | |
| Solis | Carl Strathie | 27 June 2018 (Edinburgh International Film Festival) | |
| The Sonata | Andrew Desmond | 15 November 2018 | |
| Songwriter | Murray Cummings | 23 February 2018 (Berlin International Film Festival) | |
| Spitfire | David Fairhead, Ant Palmer | 15 July 2018 | |
| Stanley a Man of Variety | Stephen Cookson | 15 June 2018 | |
| Super November | Douglas King | 3 March 2018 (Glasgow Film Festival) | |
| Surrender: the Art of Jan Fabre | Phil Griffin | 16 March 2018 (Cinedans Festival) | |
| Tango One | Sacha Bennett | 19 March 2018 (UK) | |
| Teddy Pendergrass: If You Don't Know Me | Olivia Lichtenstein | 26 October 2018 | |
| Thomas & Friends: Big World! Big Adventures! The Movie | David Stoten | 7 July 2018 (London) (premiere) | |
| Together | Paul Duddridge | 12 January 2018 | |
| Tracks | Jamie Patterson | 4 October 2018 (Raindance Film Festival) | |
| Train Set | Rob Burrows | 13 April 2018 | |
| Transition | Rob Burrows | 15 February 2018 (International Filmmaker Festival of World Cinema London) | |
| Tucked | Jamie Patterson | 21 July 2018 (Outfest Film Festival) | |
| Two for Joy | Tom Beard | 23 June 2018 (Edinburgh International Film Festival) | |
| Undercliffe | Lisa Mulcahy | 29 October 2018 (Austin Film Festival) | |
| Under The Wire | Christopher Martin | 7 September 2018 | |
| Unsettling | Iris Zaki | 21 March 2018 (CPH:DOX) | |
| The Viking War (a.k.a. Berserker: Death Fields) (Berserkers: Game Wars) | Louisa Warren | 5 February 2019 (DVD premiere) | |
| Voyageuse | May Miles Thomas | 1 March 2018 (Glasgow Film Festival) | |
| VS | Ed Lilly | 19 October 2018 | |
| We The Kings | Lauren Mackenzie | 28 September 2018 (Raindance Film Festival) | |
| Westwood: Punk, Icon, Activist | Lorna Tucker | 20 January 2018 (Sundance Film Festival) | |
| Wild Honey Pie | Jamie Adams | 12 March 2018 (South by Southwest Film Festival) | |
| Winterlong | David Jackson | 30 June 2018 (Edinburgh International Film Festival) | |
| Witch | Trevor Hayward | 1 January 2018 | |
| Women Making Films: A New Road Movie Through Cinema | Mark Cousins | 1 September 2018 (Venice Film Festival) | |
| Written by Mrs Bach: Broken Silence | Alex McCall | 8 October 2018 | |
| The Yukon Assignment | Chris Lucas | 1 October 2018 | |
| Yuli | Icíar Bollaín | 23 September 2018 (Donostia-San Sebastián International Film Festival) | |

=== Culturally British Films ===
The following list comprises films not produced by Great Britain or the United Kingdom but is strongly associated with British culture. The films in this list should fulfill at least 3 of the following criteria:

- The film is adapted from a British source material.
- The story is at least partially set in the United Kingdom.
- The film was at least partially shot in the United Kingdom.
- Many of the film's cast and crew members are British.

| Title | Country of origin | Adaptation | Story Setting | Film Locations | British Cast and Crew |
|---|---|---|---|---|---|
| Christopher Robin | United States | Winnie-the-Pooh by A. A. Milne and E. H. Shepard | London and Sussex, England | Ashdown Forest, Shepperton Studios and Windsor Great Park, United Kingdom | Ewan McGregor, Hayley Atwell, Mark Gatiss, Oliver Ford Davies, Adrian Scarborough, Roger Ashton-Griffiths, Nick Mohammed, Peter Capaldi, Sophie Okonedo |
| Holmes & Watson | United States | Sherlock Holmes stories by Sir Arthur Conan Doyle | London, England | Chatham Historic Dockyard, Hampton Court Palace and Shepperton Studios, United Kingdom | Rebecca Hall, Rob Brydon, Steve Coogan, Ralph Fiennes, Kelly Macdonald, Pam Ferris, Oliver Wood (cinematographer) |
| Mary Poppins Returns | United States | The Mary Poppins series by P. L. Travers | London, England | Shepperton Studios, outside the Bank of England and outside Buckingham Palace, United Kingdom | Emily Blunt, Ben Whishaw, Emily Mortimer, Julie Walters, Angela Lansbury, Colin Firth, Sandy Powell (costume designer), Framestore (visual effects) |
| Mortal Engines | New Zealand; United States | Mortal Engines by Philip Reeve | London, England | | Patrick Malahide, Colin Salmon, Mark Mitchinson, Regé-Jean Page |
| The Nutcracker and the Four Realms | United States | | London, England | Pinewood Studios and South Kensington, United Kingdom | Jayden Fowora-Knight, Keira Knightley, Helen Mirren, Richard E. Grant, Matthew Macfadyen, Jack Whitehall, Jenny Beavan (costume designer), Guy Hendrix Dyas (production designer), Philharmonia Orchestra (recording) |
| Peter Rabbit | Australia; United States | Peter Rabbit stories by Beatrix Potter | Lake District and London, England | Ambleside, Cumbria; Harrods, London; Lake District, United Kingdom | James Corden, Daisy Ridley, Marianne Jean-Baptiste, Rachel Ward, Dominic Lewis (composer), Roger Ford (production designer) |
| A Private War | United States | | London, England | London, United Kingdom | Rosamund Pike, Jamie Dornan, Tom Hollander, Faye Marsay, Annie Lennox (singer), Nick Fenton (film editor) |
| Robin Hood | United States | The tale of Robin Hood | Medieval England | | Otto Bathurst (director), Taron Egerton, Paul Anderson, Josh Herdman, Kane Headley-Cummings, Julian Day (costume designer) |

== British winners ==
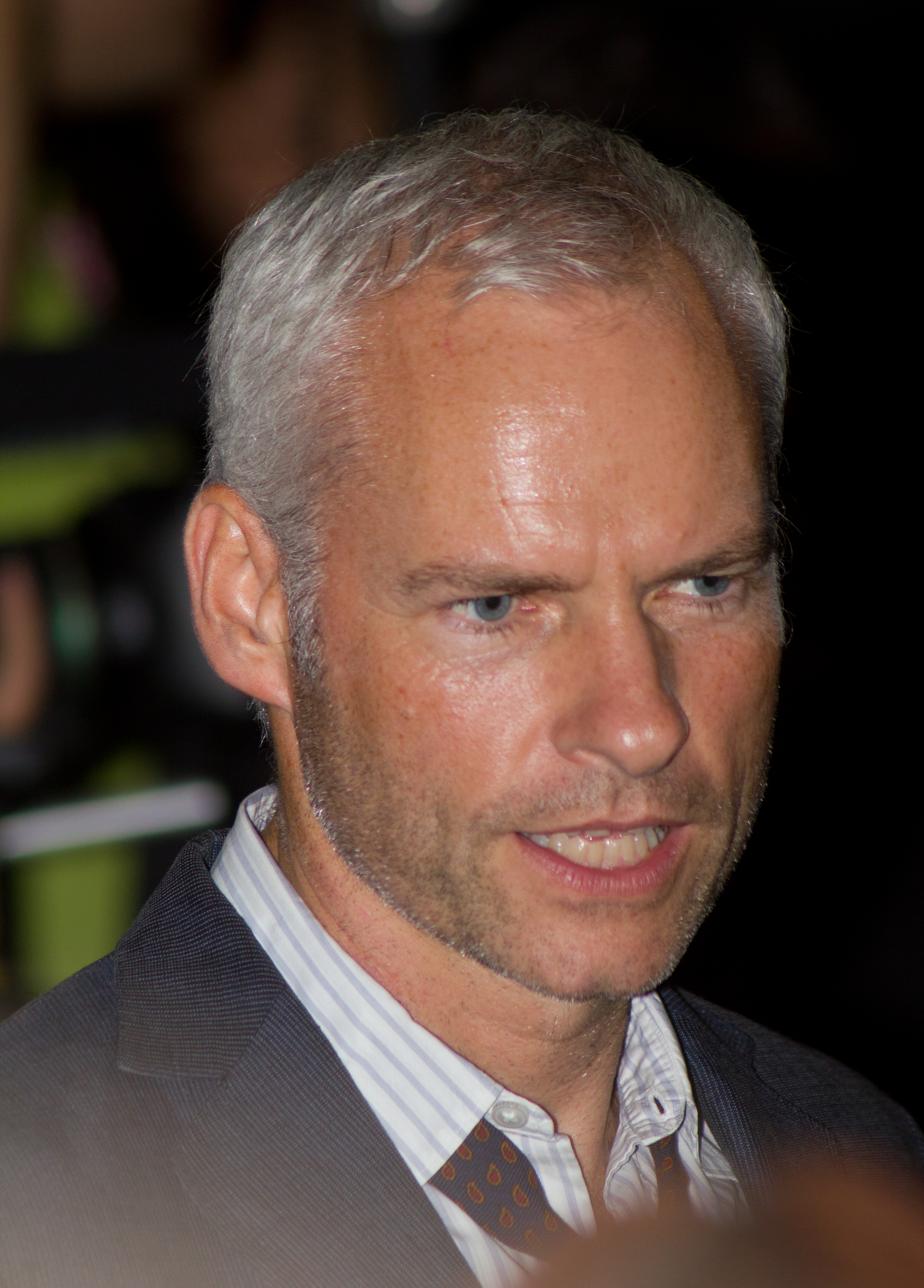
Martin McDonagh received multiple awards and nominations for his direction and writing of Three Billboards Outside Ebbing, Missouri.

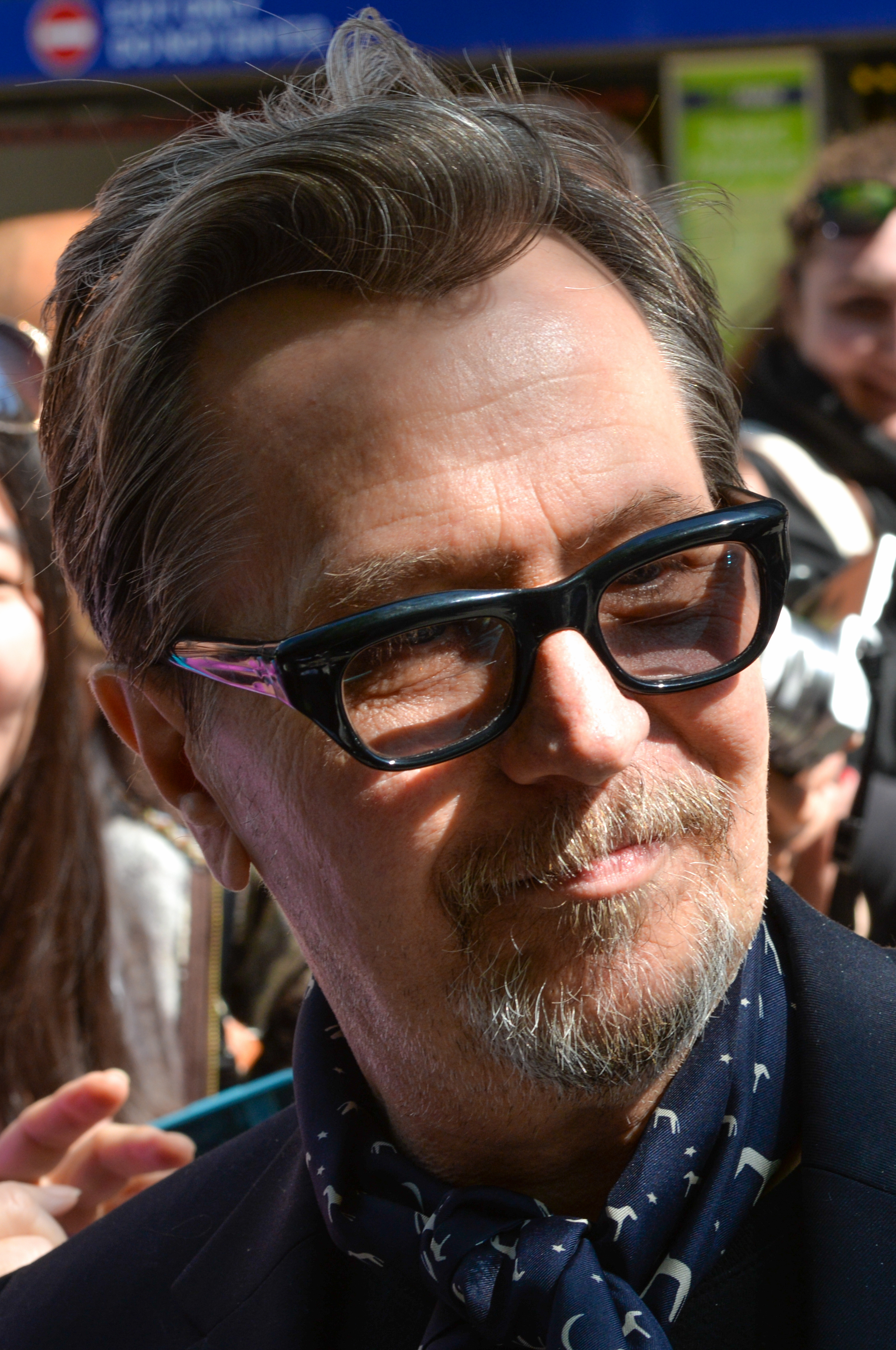
Gary Oldman, received the Best Actor award in all the four awards ceremonies for his performance in Darkest Hour.

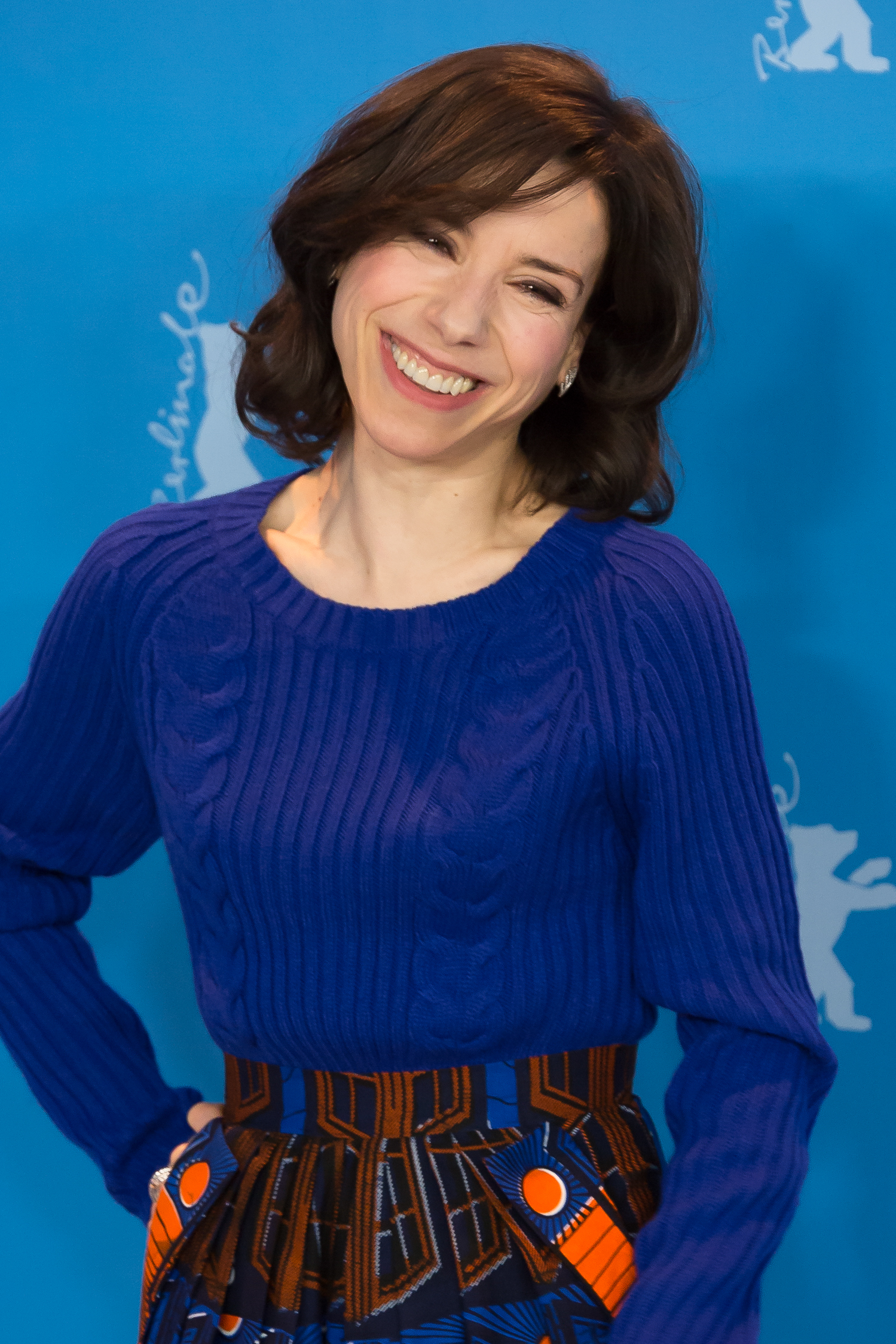
Sally Hawkins, received multiple Best Actress nominations for her performance in The Shape of Water.

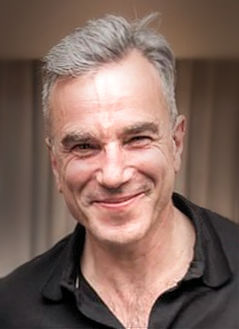
Daniel Day Lewis received multiple Best Actor nominations for Phantom Thread.

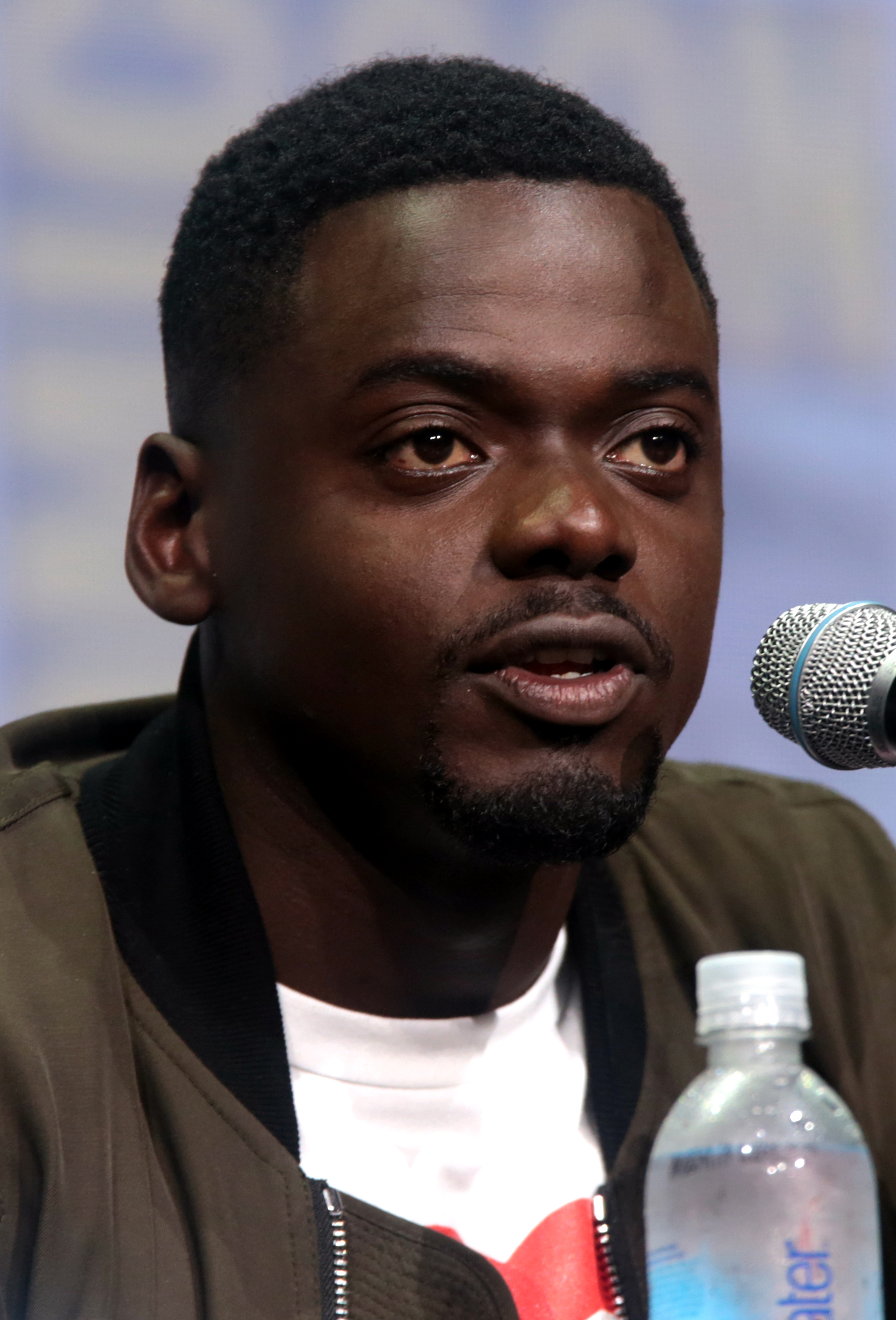
Daniel Kaluuya received multiple Best Actor nominations for Get Out. He also received the EE Rising Star Award.

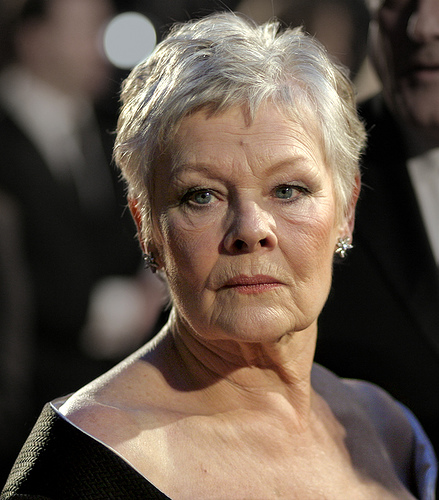
Dame Judi Dench received multiple nominations for her leading role in Victoria & Abdul.

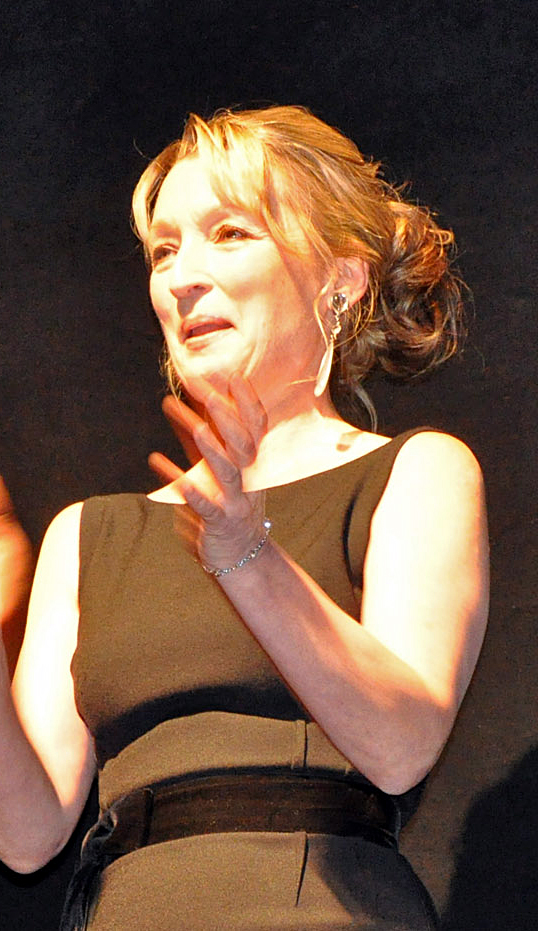
Leslie Manville received critical acclaim and multiple nominations for her supporting role in Phantom Thread.

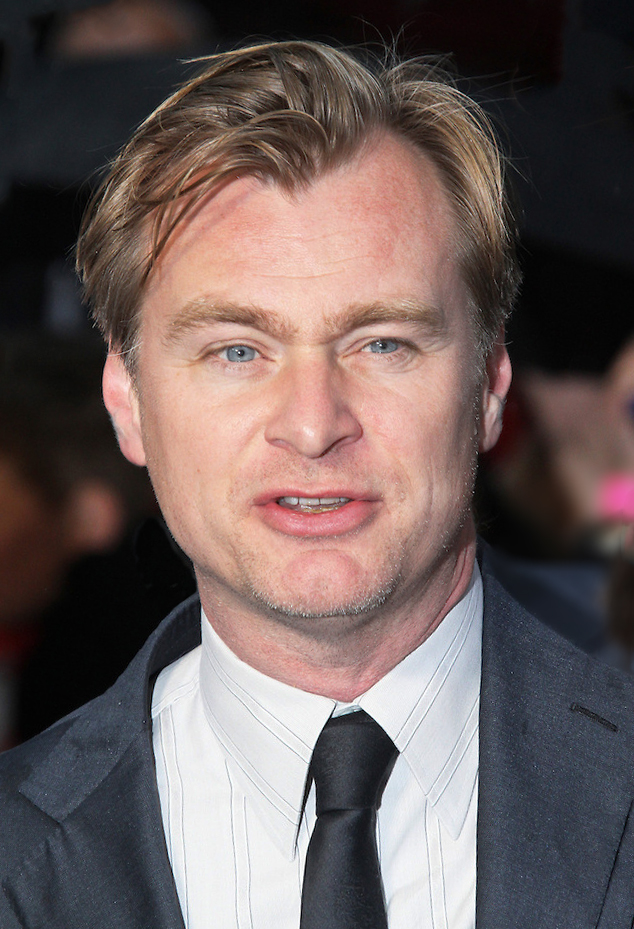
Christopher Nolan received multiple nominations for directing Dunkirk.

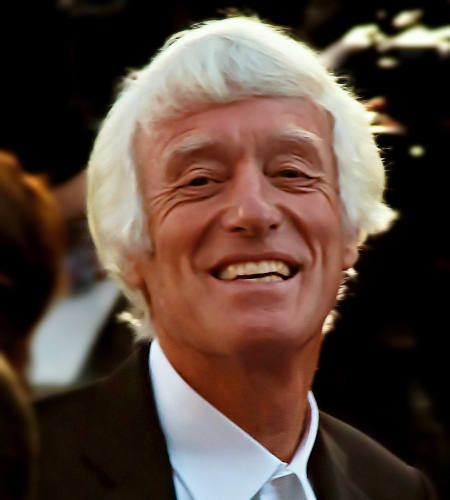
Roger Deakins received multiple Best Cinematography awards for his work in Blade Runner 2049.

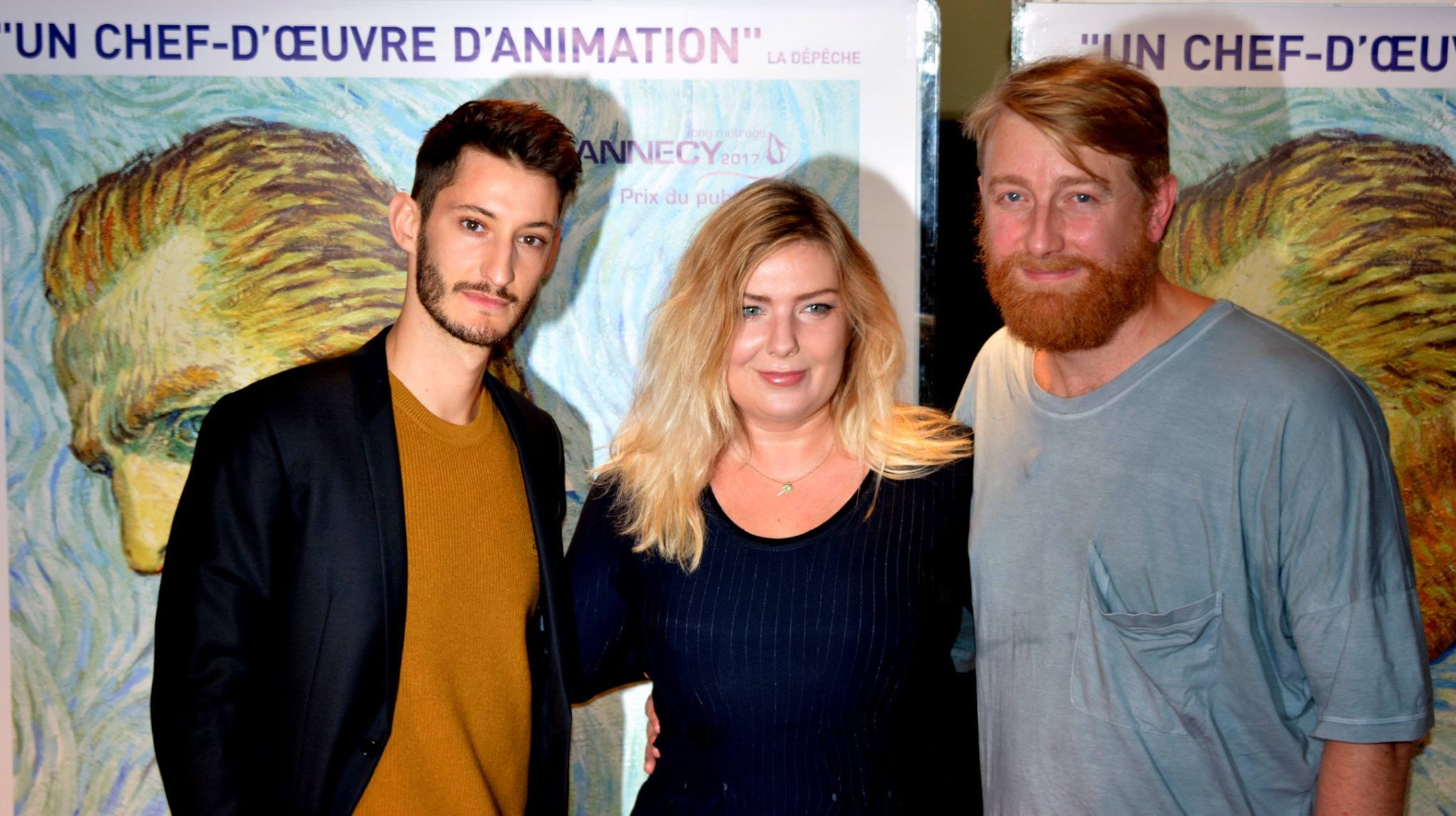
Hugh Welchman(right)'s film Loving Vincent garnered multiple nominations for Best Animated Film.

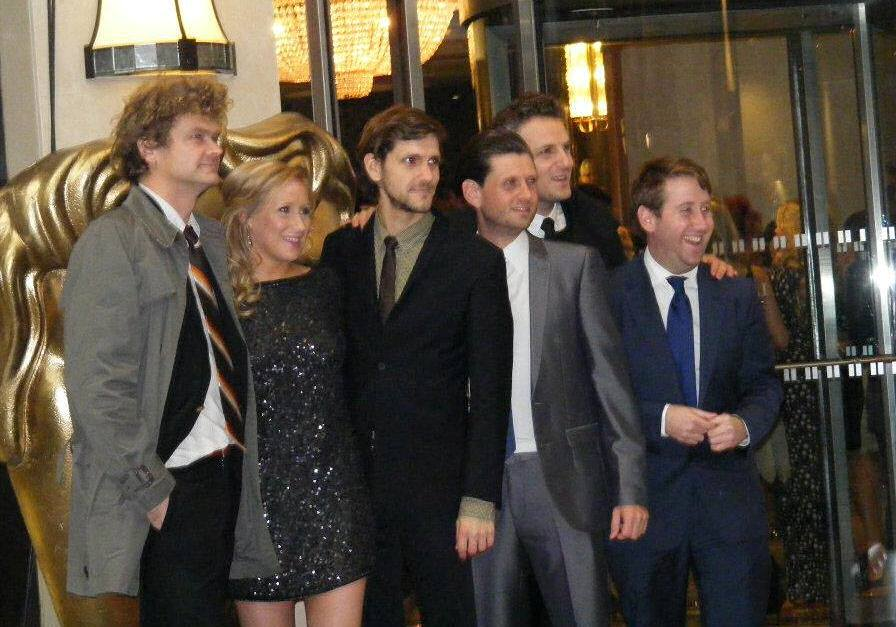
Simon Farnaby (left-most) earned Best Adapted Screenplay nominations for Paddington 2.

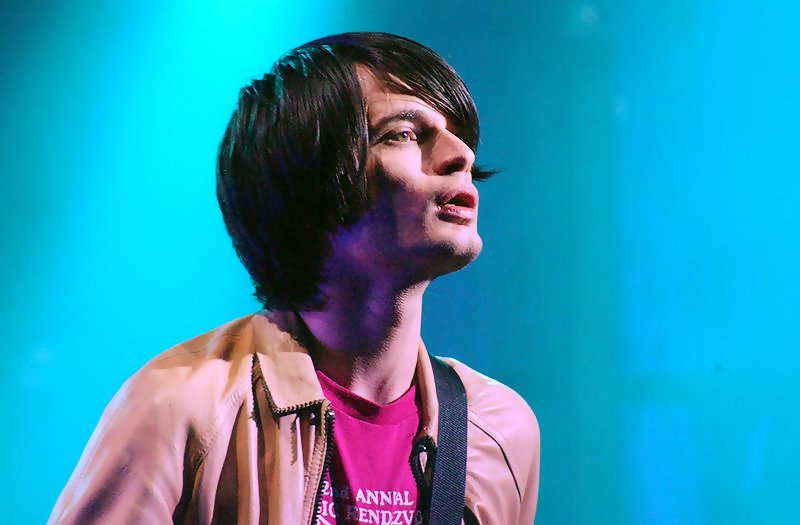
Jonny Greenwood received multiple nominations for Best Original Score in Phantom Thread.

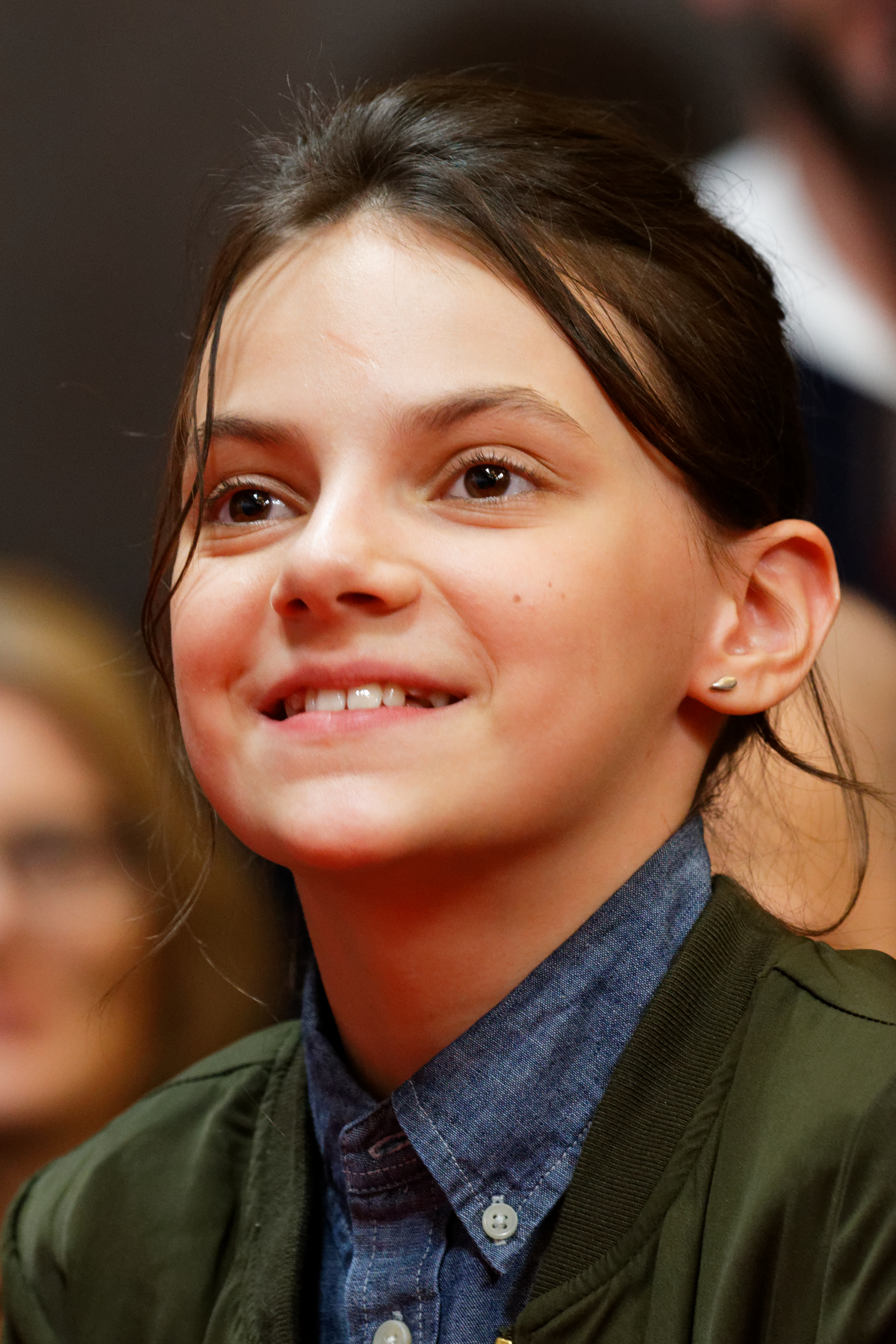
Dafne Keen earned the Best Young Actor/Actress nomination in the Critics' Choice Awards for her breakout role in Logan.

Listed here are the British winners and nominees at the four most prestigious film award ceremonies in the English-speaking world: the Academy Awards, British Academy Film Awards, Golden Globe Awards and Screen Actors Guild Awards, that were held during 2018, celebrating the best films of 2017. The British nominations were led by Three Billboards Outside Ebbing, Missouri, Dunkirk, and Darkest Hour, with Three Billboards Outside Ebbing, Missouri winning awards in the major categories and Dunkirk going on to win large numbers of technical awards, whilst Gary Oldman won multiple best leading actor awards for his portrayal of Sir Winston Churchill in Darkest Hour. British films did, however, notably lose out to The Shape of Water from USA.

=== Academy Awards ===
The 90th Academy Awards honoring the best films of 2017 were held on March 4, 2018.

British winners:

- Darkest Hour (Best Actor, Best Makeup and Hairstyling)
- Dunkirk (Best Sound Editing, Best Sound Mixing, Best Film Editing)
- The Silent Child (Best Live Action Short Film)
- Three Billboards Outside Ebbing, Missouri (Best Actress, Best Supporting Actor)
- Alex Gibson (Best Sound Editing) – Dunkirk
- Chris Overton (Best Live Action Short Film) – The Silent Child
- David Malinowski (Best Makeup and Hairstyling) – Darkest Hour
- Gary Oldman (Best Actor) – Darkest Hour
- Lucy Sibbick (Best Makeup and Hairstyling) – Darkest Hour
- Rachel Shenton (Best Live Action Short Film) – The Silent Child
- Roger Deakins (Best cinematography) – Blade Runner 2049

British nominees:

- All the Money in the World (Best Supporting Actor)
- Baby Driver (Best Sound Editing, Best Sound Mixing, Best Film Editing)
- Darkest Hour (Best Picture)
- Dunkirk (Best Picture, Best Director)
- Revolting Rhymes (Best Animated Short Film)
- Three Billboards Outside Ebbing, Missouri (Best Picture, Best Supporting Actor, Best Original Screenplay)
- Anthony McCarten (Best Picture) – Darkest Hour
- Christopher Nolan (Best Picture, Best Director) – Dunkirk
- Daniel Day-Lewis (Best Actor) – Phantom Thread
- Daniel Kaluuya (Best Actor) – Get Out
- Daniel Lupi (Best Picture) – Phantom Thread
- Daniel Phillips (Best Makeup and Hairstyling) – Victoria & Abdul
- Douglas Urbanski (Best Picture) – Darkest Hour
- Emma Thomas (Best Picture) – Dunkirk
- Eric Fellner (Best Picture) – Darkest Hour
- Graham Broadbent (Best Picture) – Three Billboards Outside Ebbing, Missouri
- Hugh Welchman (Best Animated Feature Film) – Loving Vincent
- Ivan Mactaggart (Best Animated Feature Film) – Loving Vincent
- Jacqueline Durran (Best Costume Design) – Beauty and the Beast and Darkest Hour
- JoAnne Sellar (Best Picture) – Phantom Thread
- Jonathan Amos (Best Film Editing) – Baby Driver
- Jonny Greenwood (Best Original Score) – Phantom Thread
- Julian Slater (Best Sound Editing, Best Sound Mixing) – Baby Driver
- Katie Spencer (Best Production Design) – Beauty and the Beast and Darkest Hour
- Lesley Manville (Best Supporting Actress) – Phantom Thread
- Lisa Bruce (Best Picture) – Darkest Hour
- Lou Sheppard (Best Makeup and Hairstyling) – Victoria & Abdul
- Martin McDonagh (Best Picture, Best Original Screenplay) – Three Billboards Outside Ebbing, Missouri
- Nathan Crowley (Best Production Design) – Dunkirk
- Neal Scanlan (Best Visual Effects) – Star Wars: The Last Jedi
- Peter Czernin (Best Picture) – Three Billboards Outside Ebbing, Missouri
- Sally Hawkins (Best Actress) – The Shape of Water
- Sarah Greenwood (Best Production Design) – Beauty and the Beast and Darkest Hour
- Theo Green (Best Sound Editing) – Blade Runner 2049
- Tim Bevan (Best Picture) – Darkest Hour
- Tim Cavagin (Best Sound Mixing) – Baby Driver

=== British Academy Film Awards ===
The 71st British Academy Film Awards honoring the best films of 2017 were held on 18 February 2018.

British winners:

- Baby Driver (Best Editing)
- Darkest Hour (Best Actor in a Leading Role, Best Makeup and Hair)
- Dunkirk (Best Sound)
- I Am Not a Witch (Outstanding Debut by a British Writer, Director or Producer)
- Three Billboards Outside Ebbing, Missouri (Best Film, Best Actress in a Leading Role, Best Actor in a Supporting Role, Best Original Screenplay, Outstanding British Film)
- Alex Gibson (Best Sound) – Dunkirk
- Daniel Kaluuya (EE Rising Star Award)
- David Malinowski (Best Makeup and Hair) – Darkest Hour
- Gary Oldman (Best Actor in a Leading Role) – Darkest Hour
- Graham Broadbent (Best Film, Outstanding British Film) – Three Billboards Outside Ebbing, Missouri
- Ivana Primorac (Best Makeup and Hair) – Darkest Hour
- Jonathan Amos (Best Editing) – Baby Driver
- Lucy Sibbick (Best Makeup and Hair) – Darkest Hour
- Martin McDonagh (Best Film, Best Original Screenplay, Outstanding British Film) – Three Billboards Outside Ebbing, Missouri
- Paloma Baeza (Best Short Animation) – Poles Apart
- Pete Czernin (Best Film, Outstanding British Film) – Three Billboards Outside Ebbing, Missouri
- Roger Deakins (Best Cinematography) – Blade Runner 2049
- Rungano Nyoni (Outstanding Debut by a British Writer, Director or Producer) – I Am Not a Witch

British nominees:

- All the Money in the World (Best Actor in a Supporting Role)
- Baby Driver (Best Sound)
- Darkest Hour (Best Film, Best Actor in a Leading Role, Best Actress in a Supporting Role, Best Cinematography, Outstanding British Film, Best Original Music, Best Production Design, Best Costume Design)
- The Death of Stalin (Best Adapted Screenplay, Outstanding British Film)
- Dunkirk (Best Film, Best Director, Best Cinematography, Best Original Music, Best Production Design, Best Special Visual Effects, Best Editing)
- Film Stars Don't Die in Liverpool (Best Actor in a Leading Role, Best Actress in a Leading Role, Best Adapted Screenplay)
- God's Own Country (Outstanding British Film)
- Jawbone (Outstanding Debut by a British Writer, Director or Producer)
- Lady Macbeth (Outstanding Debut by a British Writer, Director or Producer, Outstanding British Film)
- Paddington 2 (Best Actor in a Supporting Role, Best Adapted Screenplay, Outstanding British Film)
- Three Billboards Outside Ebbing, Missouri (Best Director, Best Actor in a Supporting Role, Best Cinematography, Best Editing)
- Andrew Lockley (Best Special Visual Effects) – Dunkirk
- Armando Iannucci (Best Adapted Screenplay, Outstanding British Film) – The Death of Stalin
- Ben Davis (Best Cinematography) – The Death of Stalin
- Benjamin Wallfisch (Best Original Music) – Blade Runner 2049
- Chris Corbould (Best Special Visual Effects) – Star Wars: The Last Jedi
- Christopher Nolan (Best Film, Best Director) – Dunkirk
- Daniel Day-Lewis (Best Actor in a Leading Role) – Phantom Thread
- Daniel Kaluuya (Best Actor in a Leading Role) – Get Out
- Daniel Phillips (Best Makeup and Hair) – Victoria & Abdul
- David Schneider (Best Adapted Screenplay, Outstanding British Film) – The Death of Stalin
- Florence Pugh (EE Rising Star Award)
- Gary Fettis (Best Production Design) – Dunkirk
- Hugh Grant (Best Actor in a Supporting Role) – Paddington 2
- Ian Martin (Best Adapted Screenplay, Outstanding British Film) – The Death of Stalin
- Jacqueline Durran (Best Costume Design) – Darkest Hour, Beauty and the Beast
- Jamie Bell (Best Actor in a Leading Role) – Film Stars Don't Die in Liverpool
- Joe Walker (Best Editing) – Blade Runner 2049
- Jonny Greenwood (Best Original Music) – Phantom Thread
- Johnny Harris (Outstanding Debut by a British Writer, Director or Producer) – Jawbone
- Josh O'Connor (EE Rising Star Award)
- Julian Slater (Best Sound) – Baby Driver
- Katie Spencer (Best Production Design) – Darkest Hour, Beauty and the Beast
- Kevin Loader (Outstanding British Film) – The Death of Stalin
- Kristin Scott Thomas (Best Actress in a Supporting Role) – Darkest Hour
- Lesley Manville (Best Actress in a Supporting Role) – Phantom Thread
- Lisa Bruce (Outstanding Debut by a British Writer, Director or Producer) – The Ghoul
- Lou Sheppard (Best Makeup and Hair) – Victoria & Abdul
- Martin McDonagh (Best Director) – Three Billboards Outside Ebbing, Missouri
- Mary H. Ellis (Best Sound) – Baby Driver
- Matt Greenhalgh (Best Adapted Screenplay) – Film Stars Don't Die in Liverpool
- Nathan Crowley (Best Production Design) – Dunkirk
- Neal Scanlan (Best Special Visual Effects) – Star Wars: The Last Jedi
- Paul Corbould (Best Special Visual Effects) – Dunkirk
- Paul King (Best Adapted Screenplay, Outstanding British Film) – Paddington 2
- Sally Hawkins (Best Actress in a Leading Role) – The Shape of Water
- Sarah Greenwood (Best Production Design) – Beauty and the Beast, Darkest Hour
- Simon Farnaby (Best Adapted Screenplay, Outstanding British Film) – Paddington 2
- Stuart Wilson (Best Sound) – Star Wars: The Last Jedi
- Theo Green (Best Sound) – Blade Runner 2049
- Tim Bevan (Best Film, Outstanding British Film) – Darkest Hour
- Tim Cavagin (Best Sound) – Baby Driver
- Tom Meeten (Outstanding Debut by a British Writer, Director or Producer) – The Ghoul

=== Critics' Choice Awards ===
The 23rd Critics' Choice Awards was presented on January 11, 2018.

British winners:

- Baby Driver (Best Editing) (tied with Dunkirk)
- Darkest Hour (Best Actor, Best Hair and Makeup)
- Dunkirk (Best Editing) (tied with Baby Driver)
- Three Billboards Outside Ebbing, Missouri (Best Actress, Best Supporting Actor, Best Acting Ensemble)
- Gary Oldman (Best Actor) – Darkest Hour
- Jonathan Amos (Best Editing) – Baby Driver
- Roger Deakins (Best Cinematography) – Blade Runner 2049

British nominees:

- Baby Driver (Best Action Movie)
- Battle of the Sexes (Best Actor in a Comedy, Best Actress in a Comedy)
- Darkest Hour (Best Picture, Best Score)
- Dunkirk (Best Picture, Best Director, Best Acting Ensemble, Best Cinematography, Best Production Design, Best Visual Effects, Best Score)
- Loving Vincent (Best Animated Feature)
- Murder on the Orient Express (Best Production Design)
- Three Billboards Outside Ebbing, Missouri (Best Picture, Best Director, Best Original Screenplay)
- Benjamin Wallfisch (Best Score) – Blade Runner 2049
- Christopher Nolan (Best Director) – Dunkirk
- Dafne Keen (Best Young Actor/Actress) – Logan
- Daniel Day-Lewis (Best Actor) – Phantom Thread
- Daniel Kaluuya (Best Actor) – Get Out
- Jack Thorne (Best Adapted Screenplay) – Wonder
- Jacqueline Durran (Best Costume Design) – Beauty and the Beast
- Joe Walker (Best Editing) – Blade Runner 2049
- Jonny Greenwood (Best Original Score) – Phantom Thread
- Katie Spencer (Best Production Design) – Beauty and the Beast
- Lindy Hemming (Best Costume Design) – Dunkirk
- Mark Tildesley (Best Production Design) – Phantom Thread
- Nathan Crowley (Best Production Design) – Dunkirk
- Patrick Stewart (Best Supporting Actor) – Logan
- Rebecca Alleway (Best Production Design) – Murder on the Orient Express
- Sally Hawkins (Best Actress) – The Shape of Water
- Sarah Greenwood (Best Production Design) – Beauty and the Beast

=== Golden Globe Awards ===
The 75th Golden Globe Awards was presented on January 7, 2018.

British winners:

- Three Billboards Outside Ebbing, Missouri (Best Motion Picture, Best Performance in a Motion Picture – Drama, Best Supporting Performance in a Motion Picture, Best Screenplay)
- Gary Oldman (Best Performance in a Motion Picture – Drama) – Darkest Hour
- Martin McDonagh (Best Screenplay) – Three Billboards Outside Ebbing, Missouri

British nominees:

- All the Money in the World (Best Performance in a Motion Picture – Drama, Best Supporting Performance in a Motion Picture, Best Director)
- Baby Driver (Best Performance in a Motion Picture – Musical or Comedy)
- Battle of the Sexes (Best Performance in a Motion Picture – Musical or Comedy)
- Dunkirk (Best Motion Picture, Best Director, Best Original Score)
- Loving Vincent (Best Animated Feature Film)
- Three Billboards Outside Ebbing, Missouri (Best Director, Best Original Score)
- Christopher Nolan (Best Director) – Dunkirk
- Daniel Day-Lewis (Best Performance in a Motion Picture – Drama) – Phantom Thread
- Daniel Kaluuya (Best Performance in a Motion Picture – Musical or Comedy) – Get Out
- Helen Mirren (Best Performance in a Motion Picture – Musical or Comedy) – The Leisure Seeker
- Jonny Greenwood (Best Original Score) – Phantom Thread
- Judi Dench (Best Performance in a Motion Picture – Musical or Comedy) – Victoria & Abdul
- Martin McDonagh (Best Director) – Three Billboards Outside Ebbing, Missouri
- Sally Hawkins (Best Performance in a Motion Picture – Drama) – The Shape of Water
- Ridley Scott (Best Director) – All the Money in the World

=== Screen Actors Guild Awards ===
The 24th Screen Actors Guild Awards was presented on January 21, 2018.

British winners:

- Gary Oldman (Outstanding Performance by a Male Actor in a Leading Role)
- Darkest Hour (Outstanding Performance by a Male Actor in a Leading Role)
- Three Billboards Outside Ebbing, Missouri (Outstanding Performance by a Female Actor in a Leading Role, Outstanding Performance by a Male Actor in a Supporting Role, Outstanding Performance by a Cast in a Motion Picture)

British nominees:

- Carey Mulligan (Outstanding Performance by a Cast in a Motion Picture) – Mudbound
- Daniel Kaluuya (Outstanding Performance by a Male Actor in a Leading Role, Outstanding Performance by a Cast in a Motion Picture) – Get Out
- Judi Dench (Outstanding Performance by a Female Actor in a Leading Role) – Victoria & Abdul
- Sally Hawkins (Outstanding Performance by a Female Actor in a Leading Role) – The Shape of Water
- Baby Driver (Outstanding Performance by a Stunt Ensemble in a Motion Picture)
- Battle of the Sexes (Outstanding Performance by a Male Actor in a Supporting Role)
- Dunkirk (Outstanding Performance by a Stunt Ensemble in a Motion Picture)
- Three Billboards Outside Ebbing, Missouri (Outstanding Performance by a Male Actor in a Supporting Role)
- Victoria & Abdul (Outstanding Performance by a Female Actor in a Leading Role)

== See also ==
- Lists of British films
- 2018 in film
- 2018 in British music
- 2018 in British radio
- 2018 in British television
- 2018 in the United Kingdom
- List of 2018 box office number-one films in the United Kingdom
- List of British films of 2017
- List of British films of 2019
