= The Miseducation of Cameron Post =

2012 novel by Emily M. Danforth

- Author: Emily M. Danforth
- Language: English
- Genre: Young adult, bildungsroman
- Publisher: Balzer + Bray
- Publication date: February 2012
- Publication place: United States
- Media type: Print
- Pages: 470 pp.
- ISBN: 978-0-06-202056-7

The Miseducation of Cameron Post is a coming-of-age teen novel by Emily M. Danforth published in 2012. The novel's protagonist is Cameron Post, a 12-year-old Montana girl who is discovering her own homosexuality. After her parents die in a car crash, she lives with her conservative aunt and her grandmother. When the romantic relationship she develops with her best friend is discovered she is sent to a conversion camp.

According to Danforth, the novel was influenced by the 2005 Zach Stark controversy, where teenager Zach Stark was sent to a conversion camp run by Love In Action after coming out to his parents. The story is set in the author's hometown, Miles City, Montana, in the 1990s.

== Plot ==
The Miseducation of Cameron Post begins in the summer of 1989 in Miles City, Montana, when protagonist and narrator Cameron Post is 12 years old. Cameron has been shoplifting and kissing her friend Irene Klauson while her parents die in a car accident at Quake Lake, which they visited every year. Cameron's very religious Aunt Ruth moves in with Cameron and her grandmother. Cameron begins renting VHS movies and decorating her old dollhouse to cope with her grief, and stops spending time with Irene. Irene's family discovers a fossil on their property, which results in great success and wealth for them, and Irene goes away to a boarding school. At Aunt Ruth's request, Cameron begins attending a new church, Gates of Praise, and its youth group, Firepower.

During the summer before starting high school, Cameron becomes close friends with Lindsey Lloyd, who joins the swim team with her while she stays with her father in Miles City for the summer. Lindsey is a lesbian and tells Cameron about her experiences with gay pride in Seattle, where she lives during the rest of the year with her mother. Cameron and Lindsey pursue a casual relationship, which mostly consists of kissing. They stay in touch after Lindsey returns to Seattle at the end of the summer. Aunt Ruth begins dating Ray, who sells frozen goods around the local area.

Cameron becomes friends with Coley Taylor, who is in her biology class and starts driving her to Firepower meetings. Cameron develops a crush on Coley, despite the fact that Coley has a boyfriend, Brett Eaton. Coley convinces Cameron to join her and Brett at prom. Cameron invites her best friend Jamie Lowry to prom. On prom night, Jamie realizes that Cameron is attracted to Coley. He thinks Cameron is confused and kisses her. Cameron and Jamie begin dating after that, but Cameron is never interested in anything beyond kissing him.

Cameron and Jamie argue and break up at Miles City's annual Bucking Horse Sale when Jamie realizes Cameron isn't truly attracted to him. He hooks up with another girl shortly after. Cameron goes home with Coley and they kiss, leading Coley to feel very confused, despite her largely being the initiator. Over the following summer, Cameron and Coley both get summer jobs and Brett goes away for soccer camp. Cameron and Coley begin going to the movies after work to kiss in the dark. Meanwhile, Ruth and Ray get engaged. Cameron learns that one of the lifeguards with whom she works has dated a girl before. Reverend Rick Roneous, the leader of a new full-time school that treats gay people called God's Promise, visits a Firepower meeting, which makes Cameron and Coley uncomfortable.

Coley gets her own apartment in Miles City. Cameron brings a movie to watch with Coley alone in her apartment, which features lesbian vampires. Cameron and Coley drink alcohol and begin kissing during the movie, then have sex in Coley's bed. Coley's brother Ty and his friends interrupt them and Cameron quickly leaves. Cameron feels upset after work that day when Coley doesn't visit her and decides to make out with her coworker. When Cameron returns home, she learns that Ruth invited the pastor to the house and announces that Coley revealed what they had done together, painting herself as a victim and blaming Cameron for all of it. As a result, Ruth sends Cameron to God's Promise.

At God's Promise, Cameron meets her roommate, Erin, and her new friends Jane Fonda and Lakota Two Spirit Adam. She has one-on-one meetings with Reverend Rick and Lydia March. Cameron grows closer to Jane and Adam and they sneak away together to smoke pot Jane has grown. Eventually, Rick feels that Cameron has earned the privilege to decorate her room and receive her mail. Cameron gets a letter from Coley that doubles down on her shame at what had happened between them, as well as her narrative that Cameron was the prime agitator, which upsets Cameron.

Cameron returns home for Christmas. She attends Ruth and Ray's wedding, but refuses to be Ruth's Maid of Honor. She does not get to confront Coley before she leaves. Back at God's Promise, a boy in Cameron's group sessions named Mark Turner has a breakdown during a session while speaking about how his father would not accept him. That night, Mark severely injures himself by using a razor to cut his genitals and pouring bleach over the wounds. Rick brings Mark to the hospital, but will not admit that this was a suicide attempt. This leads the authorities to investigate God's Promise. Cameron tells the officers who come to investigate that the camp's entire mission is to make the kids hate themselves, but God's Promise carries on. Cameron, Jane, and Adam plan to leave God's Promise. After finals, the three of them take a hiking trip but keep going until they reach Quake Lake, and Cameron finally finds closure with her parents' death.

== Reception ==
The Miseducation of Cameron Post received mostly positive reviews. Susan Carpenter of the Los Angeles Times called Danforth a "talented wordsmith" with "impeccable phrasing but emotional and visual clarity, drilling down into individual moments and dwelling there in slow motion to help readers experience Cameron's hopes and fears." Teen novelist Malinda Lo wrote that Danforth's writing style in Miseducation was "multilayered in the best way, with a gradual, deliberate accretion of details that creates a resonant whole." A review in School Library Journal offered praise for the writing and sense of place that Miseducation evoked while also criticizing the pacing and length of the novel.

== Film adaptation ==
On November 18, 2016, it was announced that Chloë Grace Moretz would star as Cameron Post in a film adaptation of the novel. Desiree Akhavan directed and co-wrote with Cecilia Frugiuele. The film co-stars Jennifer Ehle, John Gallagher Jr., Forrest Goodluck, Sasha Lane, Melanie Ehrlich and Quinn Shephard.

The film was first shown January 22, 2018, at the Sundance Film Festival, where it won the U.S. Grand Jury Prize, the festival's highest honor.
