= The Bisexual =

2018 British television series

- Genre: Comedy drama
- Created by: Desiree Akhavan; Rowan Riley
- Directed by: Desiree Akhavan
- Starring: Desiree Akhavan; Maxine Peake; Brian Gleeson
- Countries of origin: United Kingdom; United States
- Original language: English
- No. of seasons: 1
- No. of episodes: 6

Production
- Executive producer: Naomi De Pear
- Producer: Katie Carpenter
- Editor: Selina Macarthur
- Running time: 27–30 minutes

Original release
- Network: Channel 4 (UK); Hulu (US)
- Release: 10 October – 14 November 2018

The Bisexual is a comedy-drama television series created by Desiree Akhavan and Rowan Riley and starring Akhavan, Maxine Peake, and Brian Gleeson. The series, a co-production between British television network Channel 4 and American streaming service Hulu, debuted on 10 October 2018 in the United Kingdom and on 16 November 2018 in the United States.

== Premise ==
New Yorker Leila lives in London in a seemingly perfect decade-long relationship with her girlfriend and business partner Sadie. However, Leila discovers that she is actually bisexual and begins to explore her orientation. Though she struggles to come out to her friends, Leila makes a drastic decision with unexpected consequences.

== Cast and characters ==
- Desiree Akhavan as Leila
- Maxine Peake as Sadie Smith
- Brian Gleeson as Gabe
- Saskia Chana as Deniz
- John Dagleish as Jon-Criss

== Episodes ==
No.	Title	Directed by	Written by	Original release date
1	"Episode 1"	Desiree Akhavan	Desiree Akhavan & Cecilia Frugiuele	10 October 2018
2	"Episode 2"	Desiree Akhavan	Rowan Riley & Cecilia Frugiuele	17 October 2018
3	"Episode 3"	Desiree Akhavan	Desiree Akhavan & Cecilia Frugiuele	24 October 2018
4	"Episode 4"	Desiree Akhavan	Desiree Akhavan & Cecilia Frugiuele	31 October 2018
5	"Episode 5"	Desiree Akhavan	Desiree Akhavan & Cecilia Frugiuele	7 November 2018
6	"Episode 6"	Desiree Akhavan	Desiree Akhavan & Cecilia Frugiuele	14 November 2018

== Reception ==
The Bisexual has an approval rating of 90 percent on review aggregator website Rotten Tomatoes, based on 30 reviews. Heather Hogan at Autostraddle called the show "brilliant", adding that, "Akhavan's characters absolutely do not always do or say The Right Thing, but her writing is overflowing with compassion". Clarisse Loughrey at The Independent gave the show four stars out of five, opining that the show is "what British comedy needs to break through the stereotypes and move forward". Lucy Mangan of The Guardian described the show as "neither funny nor dramatic", giving it only two stars out of five.

In February 2023, TIME named The Bisexual as one of the Best TV Rom-Coms of the Streaming Era.
