= The Miseducation of Cameron Post (film) =

2018 film by Desiree Akhavan

- Theatrical release poster
- Directed by: Desiree Akhavan
- Screenplay by: Desiree Akhavan; Cecilia Frugiuele
- Based on: The Miseducation of Cameron Post by Emily M. Danforth
- Produced by: Cecilia Frugiuele; Michael B. Clark; Alex Turtletaub; Jonathan Montepare
- Starring: Chloë Grace Moretz; John Gallagher Jr.; Sasha Lane; Forrest Goodluck; Marin Ireland; Owen Campbell; Kerry Butler; Quinn Shephard; Emily Skeggs; Melanie Ehrlich; Jennifer Ehle
- Cinematography: Ashley Connor
- Edited by: Sara Shaw
- Music by: Julian Wass
- Production companies: Beachside; Parkville Pictures
- Distributed by: FilmRise (United States); Vertigo Releasing (United Kingdom)
- Release dates: January 22, 2018 (Sundance); August 3, 2018 (United States); September 7, 2018 (United Kingdom)
- Running time: 90 minutes
- Countries: United Kingdom; United States
- Language: English
- Budget: $900,000
- Box office: $2 million

The Miseducation of Cameron Post is a 2018 coming-of-age comedy-drama film directed by Desiree Akhavan, who co-wrote the screenplay with Cecilia Frugiuele, based on the 2012 novel by Emily M. Danforth. It stars Chloë Grace Moretz, John Gallagher Jr., Sasha Lane, Forrest Goodluck, Marin Ireland, Owen Campbell, Kerry Butler, Quinn Shephard, Emily Skeggs, Melanie Ehrlich, and Jennifer Ehle. Set in 1993, the film follows Cameron Post, a teenage orphan sent to a gay conversion therapy center by her conservative Christian guardians.

An international co-production between the United Kingdom and the United States, the film had its world premiere at the Sundance Film Festival on January 22, 2018. It was released in the United States on August 3, 2018, by FilmRise, and in the United Kingdom on September 7, 2018, by Vertigo Releasing. It received positive reviews from critics and grossed $2 million worldwide.

== Plot ==
In 1993, teenager Cameron Post is secretly involved in a romantic same-sex relationship with her girlfriend, Coley Taylor. On homecoming night, Cameron's boyfriend, Jamie Lowry, catches the girls having sex in Coley's car, and apparently ultimately outs them both.

As an orphan, Cameron is raised by her aunt Ruth, a devout Christian, who sends her to God's Promise, a gay conversion therapy center for teenagers, who are referred to as disciples there. It is run by the strict Dr. Lydia Marsh and her brother Reverend Rick, who claims that his sister's methods cured him of his own homosexuality and that two members of his church had "rescued" him from a gay bar.

Cameron's roommate, Erin, is downplaying her homosexuality and earnestly believes in the camp's program. Cameron befriends two fellow disciples, Jane Fonda, who was raised in a hippie commune, and Adam Red Eagle, a Lakota two-spirit youth whose father has converted to Christianity and believes Adam should be cured. The three teenagers bond over their mutual rebelliousness and skepticism of the camp's purpose.

During a group session, Cameron says that she thinks Coley is perfect. Dr. Marsh says that the girl's homosexuality stems from a misplaced desire to be like Coley. Cameron covertly phones her during a restaurant visit and apologizes for how things turned out. Coley says she sent Cameron a letter, but the call is ended abruptly to avoid being caught. After disrupting a kitchen chore session, Cameron has her mail privileges unexpectedly granted by Dr. Marsh, including Coley's letter.

Coley reads the letter, learning that she blames her for seducing her and that she outed Cameron. Jane reads the letter with Cameron and destroys it, calling Coley weak-willed and treacherous. Crying, she calls Ruth and begs her to be brought home, but Ruth refuses, saying she is doing this because she loves her.

Cameron tries to adapt better to the center routine, exercising with Erin to Christian workout tapes. One night, while Cameron is having a sexual dream, Erin wakes her up, and both girls kiss. Erin helps Cameron achieve an orgasm, but then regrets it, asking her not to tell anyone because she wants to change.

Mark, a disciple who had been expecting to return home shortly, is informed by letter that he must remain at the camp because his father still considers him effeminate. In a group session, Mark breaks down as he recites a passage from 2 Corinthians 12, shouting, "When I am weak, I am strong!" until he is forcibly restrained by Dr. Marsh. That night, Cameron hears yelling and sees large quantities of blood in one of the bathrooms.

The next morning, Dr. Marsh and Reverend Rick call a meeting, saying that Mark was badly injured during the night but is stable in a hospital. They do not explain what happened. After two of the disciples disrupt the group meeting, the adults hold a series of one-to-one meetings instead.

During their meeting, Rick tells Cameron that Mark mutilated his own genitals and nearly died before Adam found him. She asks why the staff was not monitoring Mark more closely, then she asks him if he and Dr. Marsh have any idea what they are doing. Rick does not answer and bursts into tears.

A government inquiry is launched into Mark's self-mutilation, but the investigator is unwilling to accept Cameron's assertion that God's Promise is inherently emotionally abusive. Disillusioned, Cameron, Jane, and Adam run away from the camp under the cover of an early morning hike. They walk to a nearby road and hitchhike away.

== Cast ==
- Chloë Grace Moretz as Cameron Post
- John Gallagher Jr. as Reverend Rick
- Sasha Lane as Jane Fonda
- Forrest Goodluck as Adam Red Eagle
- Marin Ireland as Bethany
- Owen Campbell as Mark
- Kerry Butler as Ruth Post
- Quinn Shephard as Coley Taylor
- Emily Skeggs as Erin
- Melanie Ehrlich as Helen Showalter
- Isaac Jin Solstein as Steve Cromps
- Dalton Harrod as Jamie Lowry
- Jennifer Ehle as Dr. Lydia Marsh
- Steven Hauck as Pastor Crawford
- McCabe Slye as Brett
- Dale Soules as Grandma
- Christopher Dylan White as Dane Bunsky

== Production ==
In November 2016, it was announced that Chloë Grace Moretz, Sasha Lane, John Gallagher Jr., Forrest Goodluck and Jennifer Ehle had all been cast in the film, with Desiree Akhavan directing the film, from a screenplay co-written with Cecilia Frugiuele. Michael B. Clark, Alex Turtletaub, Jonathan Montepare and Frugiuele served as producers, with Akhavan and Olivier Kaempfer as executive producers, under their Beachside and Parkville Pictures banners.

Principal photography began in November 2016 in New York State.

== Release ==
The Miseducation of Cameron Post had its world premiere at the Sundance Film Festival on January 22, 2018, where it won the Grand Jury Prize for US Drama, the festival's highest honor. Shortly afterwards, FilmRise and Vertigo Releasing acquired US and UK distribution rights to the film, respectively. The film went onto screen at the Tribeca Film Festival on April 22, 2018.

The film was originally scheduled to be released in the United States on August 10, 2018, at the Kaleidoscope Film Festival in Arkansas. However, it was pushed forward by a week to August 3, 2018. It was scheduled to be released in the United Kingdom on August 31, 2018, but was pushed back to September 7, 2018.

== Reception ==
The Miseducation of Cameron Post received positive reviews from critics. On the review aggregator website Rotten Tomatoes, the film holds an approval rating of 86% based on 185 reviews, with an average rating of 7.5/10. The website's critics consensus reads: "The Miseducation of Cameron Post tells its timely coming-of-age story with wit, compassion, and an affecting overall generosity of spirit." Metacritic, which uses a weighted average, assigned the film a score of 69 out of 100, based on 36 critics, indicating "generally favorable" reviews.

== See also ==
- Boy Erased
