= Plain Bad Heroines =

2020 gothic novel by Emily M. Danforth

- First edition US hardcover
- Author: Emily M. Danforth
- Audio read by: Xe Sands
- Illustrator: Sara Lautman
- Language: English
- Published: 2020
- Publisher: William Morrow
- Publication place: United States
- Media type: Print (hardback), ebook, audiobook
- Pages: 640 pages
- ISBN: 0062942859 First edition US hardback

Plain Bad Heroines is a 2020 gothic novel by American author Emily M. Danforth. It was first published in the United States through William Morrow and is set at a girls' boarding school during 1902 and present day in New England.

The novel derives its title from a quote by bisexual and feminist author Mary MacLane's The Story of Mary MacLane.

== Synopsis ==
The novel is set during two time periods: 1902 and present day.

In 1902 readers are introduced to Clara and Flo, students living in Rhode Island and attending Brookhants School for Girls. They are completely infatuated with each other. They also share a love for Mary MacLane and a memoir she wrote, to the point where they create a secret club called The Plain Bad Heroine Society. The two meet an untimely death in a nearby orchard, the site of their club meetings and trysts, stung to death by eastern yellowjackets. Their deaths are not the last in the school, which closes five years later. Three more people died in the intervening years. As a result, the school is believed to be both haunted and cursed.

In the modern day, the abandoned school is now the site of a film production, based on a book detailing Brookhants' history. Celebrities Harper Harper and Audrey Wells have been cast as Flo and Clara, respectively. They travel out to the school with the book's author, Merritt Emmons, and the rest of the film's cast and crew, but soon discover that the school's curse may actually exist.

== Development ==
Danforth came up with the idea for the novel based on her interest in film sets rumored to be cursed, and in the production process of great films. She wanted the novel to feature protagonists who were both in their 30s and explicitly queer, as opposed to characters who were "coded, erased, hidden". She listed Mrs. Danvers in Rebecca, as an example. She also utilized author Mary MacLane's memoir The Story of Mary MacLane in Plain Bad Heroines, as the author and her work are frequently mentioned and discussed by Danforth's characters. Danforth also derives the book's title from MacLane's memoir, where she states "I wish some one would write a book about a plain, bad heroine so that I might feel in real sympathy with her.”

Danforth also stated that she drew upon stories surrounding films such as The Omen, The Exorcist, and Poltergeist, and that "The fire in the costume trailer in Plain Bad Heroines was directly inspired by the prop storage facility burning down during the production of The Possession." She has described the novel as "like Picnic at Hanging Rock and The Blair Witch Project, but with lesbians".

== Release ==
Plain Bad Heroines was released in the United States in hardback and e-book format through William Morrow on October 20, 2020, featuring illustrations by Sara Lautman. An audiobook adaptation narrated by Xe Sands was released simultaneously through HarperAudio.

The novel will be released in the United Kingdom on February 4, 2021, through The Borough Press.

== Reception ==
Plain Bad Heroines has received praise for its queer representation.

Hillary Kelly of the Los Angeles Times stated that "Every major character is a queer woman — every last one — and each of them wears her sexuality differently, an idea that shouldn’t feel revelatory in 2020 but annoyingly does." The San Francisco Chronicle's Datebook also cited the characters as a highlight, as they felt that they "are neither plain nor bad, but human: rebellious, insecure, funny, deep with longing and scars still healing". Lambda Literary also praised the book's characters and representation, while also noting that "One of the main throughlines of Plain Bad Heroines is the recovery of queer history."

Plain Bad Heroines was named a Most Anticipated Book by Entertainment Weekly, the Washington Post, USA Today, Time, O, BuzzFeed, Harper's Bazaar, Vulture, Parade, HuffPost, Refinery29, Popsugar, E! News, Bustle, The Millions, Goodreads, Autostraddle, Lambda Literary, and Literary Hub.

The book received the following accolades:

- 2021 Alex Award winner
- 2021 Stonewall Honor Book in Literature Shortlist
- 2021 Over the Rainbow List
- 2021 Locus Award Nominee for Best Horror Novel
- 2020 Goodreads Choice Award Nominee for Horror
- 2020 Shirley Jackson Award Nominee for Novel
