= Forrest Goodluck =

Native American actor (born 1998)

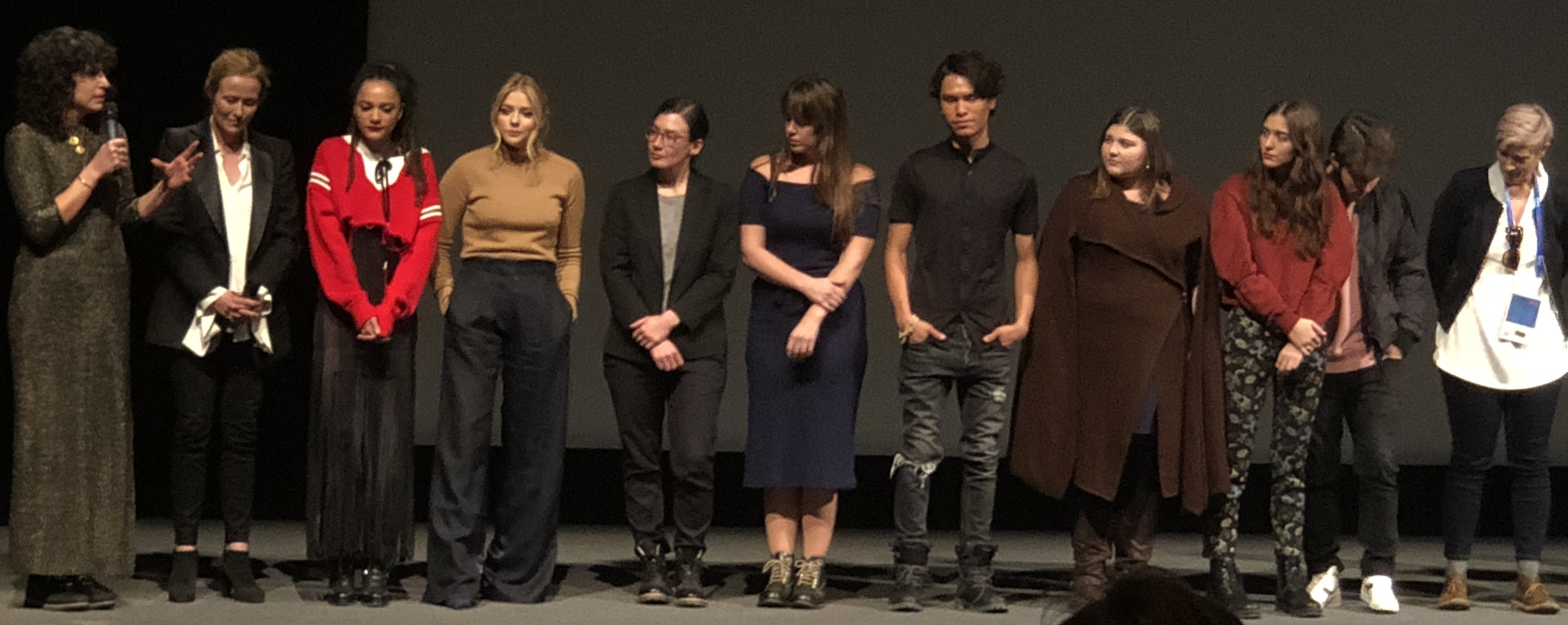
- Goodluck with the cast of "The Miseducation of Cameron Post" at 2018 Sundance Film Festival
- Born: August 6, 1998 (age 28); Albuquerque, New Mexico, U.S.
- Citizenship: Three Affiliated Tribes of the Fort Berthold Reservation • American
- Occupation: Actor

Forrest Goodluck (born August 6, 1998) is a Native American actor. His debut film role was in the 2015 award-winner The Revenant, where he played Hawk, the son of Leonardo DiCaprio's character Hugh Glass.

Goodluck was one of three actors to star as the lead Saul in the 2017 film Indian Horse. He had a supporting role in the 2018 film The Miseducation of Cameron Post as Adam Red Eagle, a two-spirit teenager who befriends Chloë Grace Moretz's title character at a conversion therapy camp. His other film appearances include the 2019 zombie horror Blood Quantum and the 2022 thriller How to Blow Up a Pipeline, in which he portrayed ecoterrorist Michael. In the 2023 horror prequel Pet Sematary: Bloodlines he played the new character of Manny. He starred in the 2025 supernatural film At the Place of Ghosts as Antle, one of the two leads.

On television, Goodluck was part of the main cast of both The Republic of Sarah (2021) and Panhandle (2022). He also appeared in the 2023 Paramount+ western miniseries Lawmen: Bass Reeves as Billy Crow.

== Early life ==
A Native American, Goodluck was born in Albuquerque, New Mexico. His father, Kevin, is Navajo. His mother Laurie's ancestry includes Navajo, Hidatsa, Mandan, and Tsimshian from Alaska. His maternal grandmother was a citizen of the Three Affiliated Tribes from the Fort Berthold Indian Reservation. Goodluck is a citizen of the Three Affiliated Tribes.

== Career ==
Goodluck's first acting experience was during a sixth-grade production of A Charlie Brown Christmas at his elementary school; later, he performed in stage and theater productions in middle and high school. At age 13, he auditioned for Native American director Chris Eyre's film Man Called Buffalo, which never made it to production. He did get an opportunity to network with future casting directors.

Goodluck auditioned for the part of Hawk in the 2015 film The Revenant when he was 16 years old. The Revenant was his first feature film role. Goodluck won Best Performance in a Feature Film – Supporting Young Actor (14–21) at the 37th Young Artist Awards for his role as Hawk.

In February 2016, he was cast to appear in a pilot for the Hulu drama Citizen as Guero, a "wiry graduate of the streets who serves as the charismatic and bipolar leader of a group called 'Baby Narcos.'" In November 2016, it was announced Goodluck would star opposite Chloë Grace Moretz and Sasha Lane in The Miseducation of Cameron Post. He starred as Saul Indian Horse in the 2017 drama Indian Horse about the history of Canadian boarding schools and the aboriginal people.

In 2022, he played the self-taught explosive expert Michael in Daniel Goldhaber's eco-thriller How to Blow Up a Pipeline. A key sequence of the film was shot on the reservation where the actor's family lived, which had been affected by oil drilling. In 2023, he played Billy Crow in the Western mini-series Lawmen: Bass Reeves.

== Filmography ==
=== Film ===
Year	Title	Role	Note
2015	The Revenant	Hawk	
2016	Ink	Destin	Short film
2017	Indian Horse	Saul at 15	
2018	The Miseducation of Cameron Post	Adam Red Eagle	
2018	Mud	Joseph	Short film
2019	Blood Quantum	Joseph	
2020	I Used to Go Here	Animal Springstine	
2021	Cherry	James Lightfoot	
2022	How to Blow Up a Pipeline	Michael	Also executive producer
2023	Pet Sematary: Bloodlines	Manny	
2025	What We Hide	Cody	
2025	Trust	Merg	
2025	At the Place of Ghosts	Mise’l	

=== Television ===
Year	Title	Role	Note
2018	Designated Survivor	Wesleyan Applicant	Episode: "Original Sin"
2020	The Liberator	Private Cloudfeather	Episode: “Why We Fight”
2021	The Republic of Sarah	Tyler	Main cast
2022	Panhandle	Checotah	Main cast
2022	The English	White Moon	Episode: "Cherished"
2023	The Proud Family: Louder and Prouder	Tyee (voice)	Episode: "Old Towne Road: Part 2"
2023	Accused	Chase	Episode: "Naathaanii's Story"
2023	Lawmen: Bass Reeves	Billy Crow	Main cast

=== Video games ===
Year	Title	Role	Note
2020	Tell Me Why	Michael Abila / Officer Holt	

== Awards and nominations ==
Year	Award	Category	Film	Result	Ref
2016	Young Artist Awards	Best Performance in a Feature Film (Supporting Young Actor, Ages 14–21)	The Revenant	Won	
