= Emily M. Danforth =

American author (born 1980)

- Born: January 17, 1980 (age 46); Miles City, Montana, U.S.
- Education: University of Montana (MFA); University of Nebraska–Lincoln (PhD)
- Partner: Erica E. Edsell
- Writing career
- Genres: Young adult, LGBT
- Subjects: Coming-of-age, bildungsroman
- Notable work: The Miseducation of Cameron Post
- Website: emdanforth.com

Emily M. Danforth (born January 17, 1980) is an American writer.

== Early life and education ==
Danforth was born and raised in Miles City, Montana. She attended Hofstra University, where she came out. She received a Master of Fine Arts degree from the University of Montana and earned her Ph.D. at the University of Nebraska–Lincoln. She lives in Providence, Rhode Island, with her wife.

== Novels ==
Her debut novel, The Miseducation of Cameron Post, was published in February 2012. This book became the basis for a 2018 film with the same name.

Her second novel, published in 2020, is Plain Bad Heroines. The book is set in a Rhode Island boarding school and the Los Angeles film industry.
