= Desiree Akhavan =

American film director, producer, screenwriter and actress

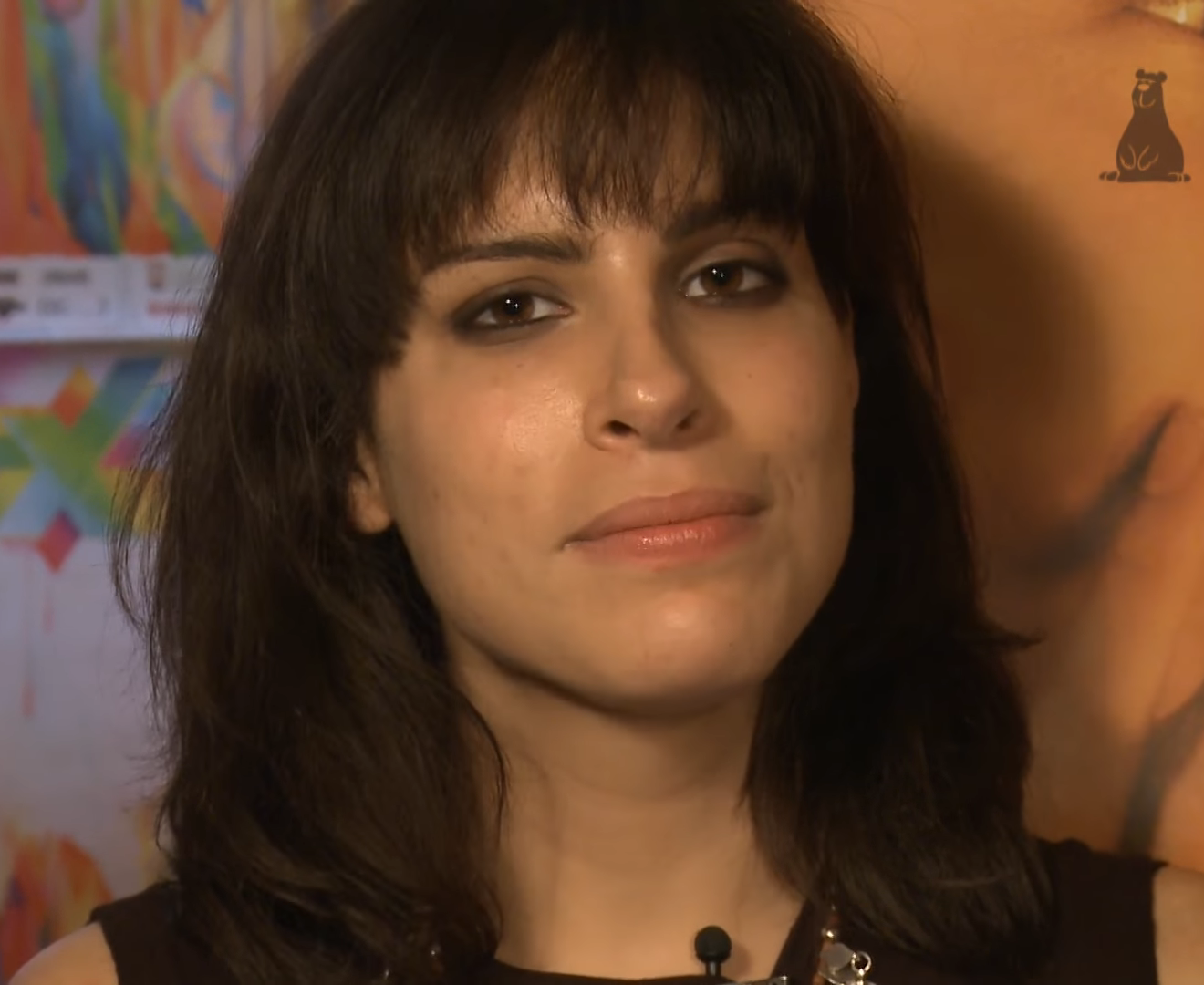
- Akhavan in 2015
- Born: December 27, 1984 (age 41); Manhattan, New York, U.S.
- Education: Smith College; New York University
- Occupations: Filmmaker; actress; writer
- Years active: 2010–present

Desiree Akhavan (Persian: دزیره اخوان, born December 27, 1984) is an American filmmaker, writer, and actress. She is best known for her 2014 feature film debut Appropriate Behavior, and her 2018 film The Miseducation of Cameron Post.

== Early life and education ==
Akhavan was born in Manhattan, New York in 1984. She has stated in interviews she now identifies as American. Her father has not returned to Iran since the 1980s, though Akhavan occasionally visited family overseas as a child. As a child, Akhavan lived in New Jersey before her family moved to Rockland County, New York. As a commuting student, she attended the Horace Mann School, an independent prep school in The Bronx.

Akhavan has attributed her first experiences with American culture through watching TV shows and films. She began writing plays when she was 10 years old and began acting in plays at 13 years old.

Akhavan studied Film and Theatre at Smith College, a women's college in Northampton, Massachusetts, where she was "a bit of a loner". After graduating in 2007, she studied film directing as a graduate student at New York University's Tisch School of the Arts. She also spent a year studying abroad at Queen Mary, University of London.

== Career ==
Akhavan made her first short film Two Drink Minimum while studying in London as a graduate student. In 2010, she wrote and directed the short film Nose Job.

Akhavan has regularly appeared in her own work following her writing, directing, and acting in the lesbian-themed web series The Slope. She and Ingrid Jungermann, her creative partner, were named to Filmmaker's 25 New Faces of Independent Film in 2012. The series premiered in 2011.

She plays a writing student in season 4 of Girls. The role was offered to her after Lena Dunham and Jenni Konner saw her film Appropriate Behaviour.

In 2014, Akhavan's film Appropriate Behavior, in which she plays an alternative version of herself, premiered at the Sundance Film Festival. The film was first written as her senior thesis paper as a graduate student at New York University. Although it is inspired by personal events in Akhavan's life, such as the break up of her first same-sex relationship, she has asserted that the film is not autobiographical. That year, she was also selected for the Sundance Institute's Episodic Story Lab for her pilot script Switch Hitter.

In 2015, Akhavan was the President of the Queer Palm jury at the Cannes Film Festival.

She has stated she draws inspiration from people such as Todd Solondz and Noah Baumbach.

Channel 4 commissioned a sitcom called The Bisexual to be written, directed by and starring Akhavan. It aired on October 10, 2018, in the U.K. and on November 16, 2018, in the U.S. The sitcom explores misconceptions of bisexuality. In an interview with UK's Bazaar, she said, "To me that was the perfect way to handle bisexuality, through the lens of a lesbian."

In November 2016, it was announced Akhavan would write, direct and produce The Miseducation of Cameron Post, starring Chloë Grace Moretz, and Sasha Lane. The critically acclaimed film won the 2018 Grand Jury Prize at the Sundance Film Festival, and was officially selected for the 2018 Tribeca Film Festival, Seattle International Film Festival, Toronto LGBT Film Festival, San Francisco International LGBTQ Film Festival, Outfest, and the San Francisco Indie Film Festival, earning multiple additional nominations and awards.

In an interview about her career with The Guardian, Akhavan proclaimed, "The only mainstream queer female stories have been directed by men--it disgusts me." In the same interview, Akhavan explains her intentions behind directing The Miseducation of Cameron Post. "I didn’t want it to be propaganda, though I think that would be a more commercially successful film. I wanted the tone to be right… Every film about teens is really about the moment they realise that none of the adults know what they’re doing."

On November 17, 2018, Akhavan attended the Vulture Festival, speaking at a sit-down conversation alongside actresses Chloë Grace Moretz and Tatum O’Neal to discuss working in the film industry.

In 2024, Akhavan's essay collection You're Embarrassing Yourself: Stories of Love, Lust and Movies was released. It follows Akhavan's life from childhood, to a nose job, to her time as an NYU graduate student, to her success as a filmmaker, all written in her characteristic self-deprecating humour. The book won the award for Bisexual Nonfiction at the 37th Lambda Literary Awards.

== Activism ==
Desiree Akhavan is an activist in advocating for the LGBTQ community in the film industry. She recounted in an interview that when she pitched The Bisexual to networks in Los Angeles in 2015, she "was rejected everywhere.” She stated the rejection was “because Americans are terrified of female sexuality,” on Twitter. Her work focuses on queer female stories, such as her films The Miseducation of Cameron Post, The Bisexual, and Appropriate Behaviour.

After doing well at Sundance, The Miseducation of Cameron Post had trouble finding a distributor, which Akhavan attributes to the evident sexism in the industry. "Very few women have won the Sundance award, and it’s not escaping me that the one film that’s about female sexuality, directed by a woman, is having a harder time getting out there," she says. "Things are changing in the industry, but female-driven stories, specifically sexually driven female stories, are very difficult. If there is sex in the film, it has to be a man’s pleasure."

Like many, Akhavan is calling for change in the film industry. "There’s clearly something toxic in this industry, a place where women are paid a quarter of what the men are paid for the exact same job. Clearly there’s something diseased here. And now maybe we’ll see that the work won’t suffer because of this, that it will become exciting and diverse and tell stories we haven’t heard before."

When Akhavan was asked about the future of queer TV in her interview with Bazaar, she said, "There’s less of a separatist feeling the way we had at the time The L Word was being produced, so I think more queer subject matter is inching its way into mainstream television."

In June 2019, to mark the 50th anniversary of the Stonewall riots, an event widely considered a watershed moment in the modern LGBTQ rights movement, Queerty named her one of the Pride50 "trailblazing individuals who actively ensure society remains moving towards equality, acceptance and dignity for all queer people".

== Personal life ==
Akhavan is bisexual. She often explores her bisexuality within her work. She currently lives in Brooklyn, New York.

== Filmography ==
=== Film ===
Year	Title	Director	Writer	Producer	Role	Notes	Ref(s)
2009	The Feast of Stephen					Second assistant director; short film	
2010	Nose Job	Yes	Yes	No		Short film	
2010	Ankur					Assistant director; short film	
2010	Yardsale					Assistant director; short film	
2010	Phishing					Sound mixer; short film	
2011	Lena dhe Unë					Assistant director; short film	
2011	Her Seat is Vacant					Production manager; short film	
2013	All Her Notebooks					Assistant director; short film	
2013	My Mom and Other Monsters					Production manager; short film	
2014	Appropriate Behavior	Yes	Yes	No	Shirin	Also director and writer; feature directorial debut	
2017	Creep 2	No	No	No	Sara		
2018	The Miseducation of Cameron Post	Yes	Yes	No			

=== Television ===
Year	Title	Role	Notes	Ref(s)
2015	Girls	Chandra	3 episodes	
2016–2018	Flowers	Carol	5 episodes	
2016	The Circuit	Angie	TV pilot	
2018	The Bisexual	Leila	6 episodes Also co-creator, writer and director	
2020	Briarpatch	—N/a	Director: "Breadknife Weather"	
2020	Ramy	—N/a	Director: "Uncle Naseem"	
2020	Monsterland	—N/a	Director: "Iron River, MI"	
2021	Hacks	—N/a	Director: 2 episodes	
2022	I Love That for You	—N/a	Director: 2 episodes	
2023	Tiny Beautiful Things	—N/a	Director: 4 episodes	
2025	Overcompensating	—N/a	Director: 4 episodes	

=== Web ===
Year	Title	Role	Notes	Ref(s)
2010–2012	The Slope	Desiree	Also director, writer and producer	

=== Personal television appearances ===
Year	Title	Notes	Role	Ref(s)
2014	How We Make Movies	TV series	Herself	
2018	Entertainment Tonight Canada	TV series	Herself	
2018	Dykes, Camera, Action!	Documentary	Herself	
2019	Hollywood Insider	TV series	Herself	

== Bibliography ==
- You're Embarrassing Yourself: Stories of Love, Lust, and Movies. Penguin Random House. 2024. ISBN 978-0-399-58850-1.

== Awards and nominations ==
Year	Award	Category	Work	Result	Ref(s)
2014	Independent Spirit Award	Best Debut Script	Appropriate Behavior	Nominated	
2014	San Diego Asian Film Festival	Grand Jury Award	Appropriate Behavior	Won	
2018	Sundance Film Festival	Grand Jury Prize - U.S. Dramatic	The Miseducation of Cameron Post	Won	
2018	Dallas International Film Festival	Grand Jury Prize	The Miseducation of Cameron Post	Nominated	
2018	Molodist International Film Festival	Sunny Bunny Prize	The Miseducation of Cameron Post	Nominated	
2018	Seattle International Film Festival	Futurewave Youth Jury Award	The Miseducation of Cameron Post	Nominated	
2018	Sydney Film Festival	Sydney Film Prize	The Miseducation of Cameron Post	Nominated	
2018	São Paulo International Film Festival	New Directors Competition	The Miseducation of Cameron Post	Nominated	
2018	Transatlantyk Festival: Lodz	Transatlantyk Distribution Award	The Miseducation of Cameron Post	Nominated	
2018	Valladolid International Film Festival	Silver Spike	The Miseducation of Cameron Post	Won	
2018	Valladolid International Film Festival	Youth Jury Award	The Miseducation of Cameron Post	Nominated	
2018	Valladolid International Film Festival	Golden Spike	The Miseducation of Cameron Post	Nominated	
2025	Lambda Literary Awards	Bisexual Nonfiction	You're Embarrassing Yourself	Won	

== See also ==
- List of female film and television directors
- List of LGBT-related films directed by women
- LGBT culture in New York City
- List of LGBT people from New York City
- NYC Pride March
- List of Iranian actresses
