= Sasha Lane =

American actress

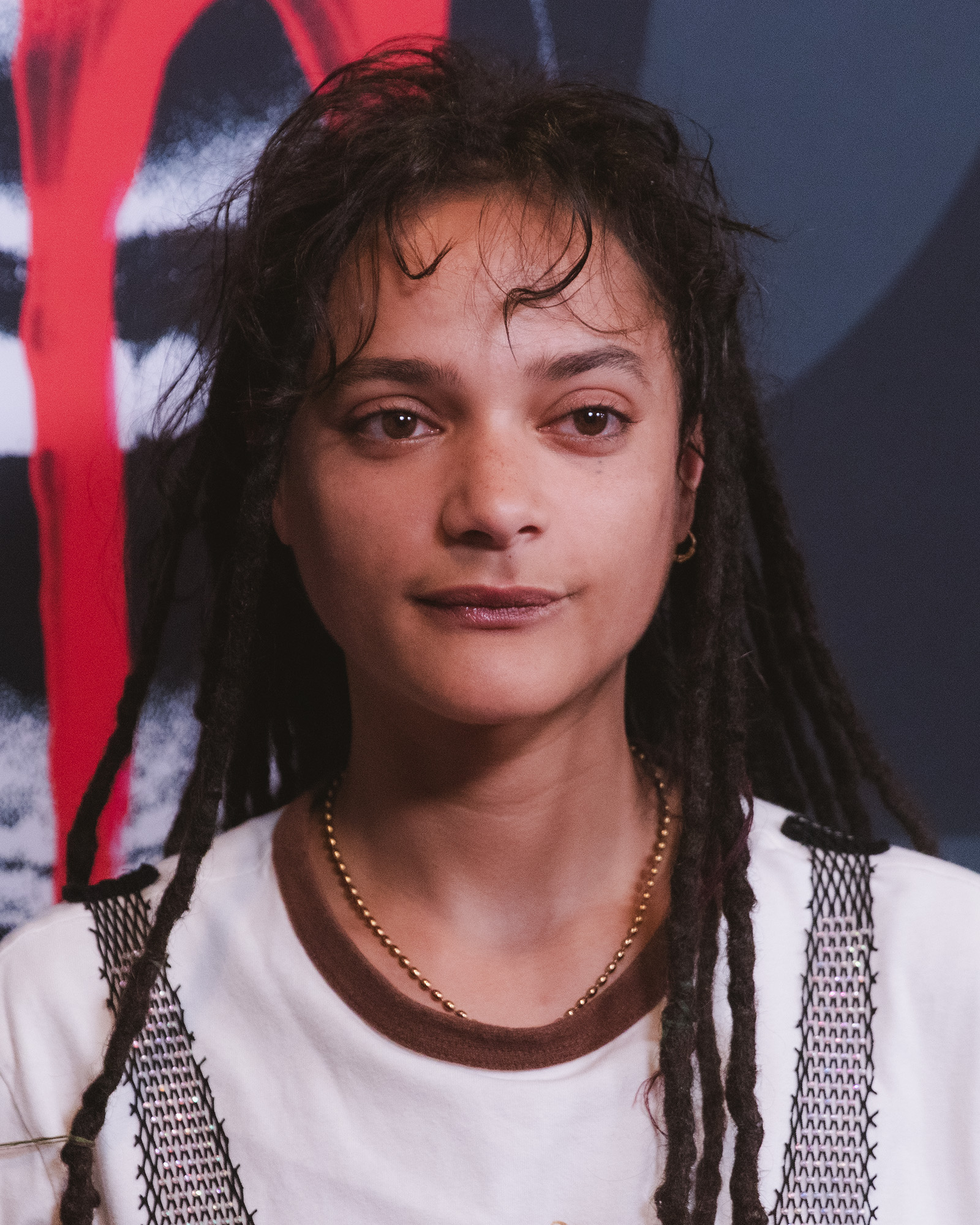
- Lane in 2026
- Born: September 29, 1995 (age 30); Houston, Texas, U.S.
- Occupation: Actress
- Years active: 2016–present
- Children: 1

Sasha Bianca Lane (born September 29, 1995) is an American actress. She made her film debut in American Honey (2016), directed by Andrea Arnold, before portraying Hunter C-20 in the first season of the Disney+ television series Loki, set in the Marvel Cinematic Universe (MCU).

== Early life ==
Lane was born in Houston, Texas, and grew up in Dallas, Texas. Her father is African-American, and her mother is of New Zealander Māori descent. After her parents divorced when she was young, Lane went to live with her mother, moving several times near Dallas before settling in Frisco, Texas. She has one brother, Sergio D'Arcy. Prior to becoming an actress, Lane attended Liberty High School, where she was a stand-out athlete on the basketball and track and field teams, and also worked as a hostess at an On the Border in Frisco. Lane graduated high school in 2014, and went on to attend Texas State University in San Marcos, Texas, but left.

== Career ==
Lane made her film debut in the critically acclaimed and award-winning American Honey (2016), a film about magazine crews, written and directed by Andrea Arnold, starring opposite Shia LaBeouf and Riley Keough. Arnold spotted Lane sunbathing on a beach while on spring break. Lane said in an interview that she "felt Arnold's vibe and decided to trust Arnold for an audition."

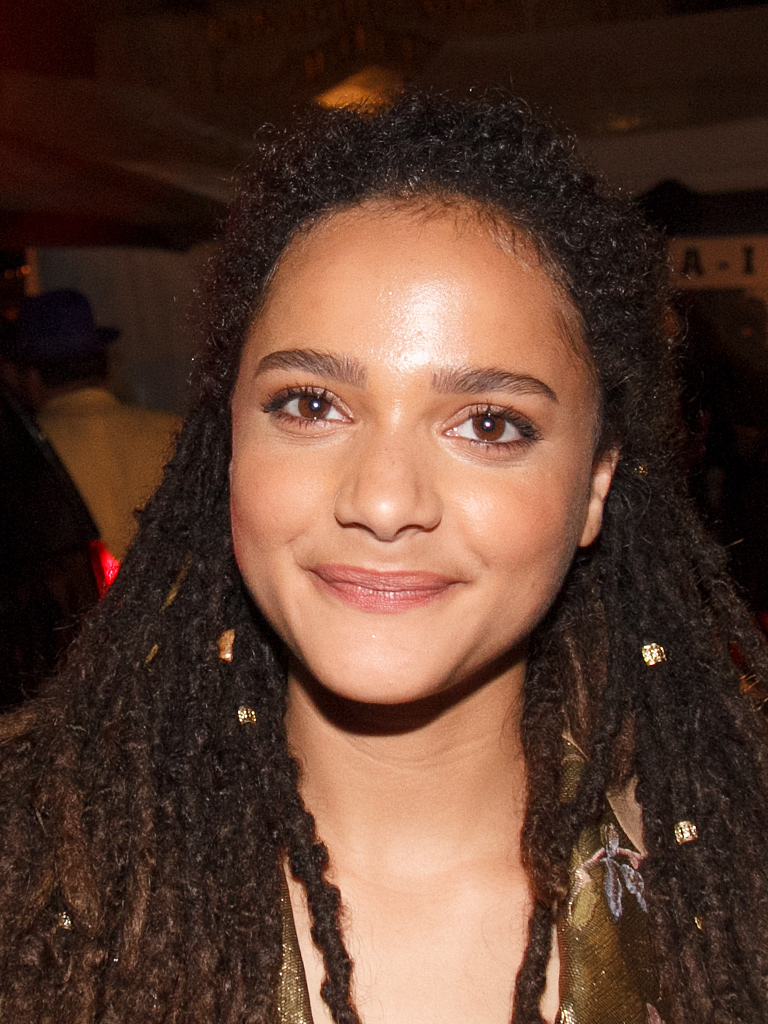
Lane in 2016

The film had its world premiere on May 15, 2016, at the Cannes Film Festival, where it won the Prix du Jury. The film was released in a limited release on September 30, 2016, by A24. In 2017, Lane starred in Born in the Maelstrom, a short film directed by Meryam Joobeur. In 2018, Lane starred in Hearts Beat Loud, opposite Nick Offerman and Kiersey Clemons, directed by Brett Haley, and The Miseducation of Cameron Post directed by Desiree Akhavan. The Miseducation of Cameron Post won Top Prize at the 2018 Sundance Film Festival and has been praised for its “sensitive, understated portrayal of adolescent self-doubt and discovery.” In 2019, Lane played Alice Monaghan in Hellboy, directed by Neil Marshall.

She appeared in horror thriller film Daniel Isn't Real (2019), directed by Adam Egypt Mortimer.

In 2020, Lane starred in an episode of Amazing Stories for Apple TV+ executive produced by Steven Spielberg. She then starred in Utopia created by Gillian Flynn, an American remake of the British television show of the same name for Amazon Prime Video. In May 2020, she was cast in Loki, which premiered in June 2021. In February 2021, she was cast in Conversations with Friends, an adaptation of Sally Rooney's 2017 debut novel.

She appeared in Twisters, directed by Lee Isaac Chung.

== Personal life ==
In 2015, Lane came out as bisexual, and she described herself as gay in 2018. In 2020, she gave birth to a daughter.

Lane has schizoaffective disorder. As of 2016, she lives in Los Angeles.

== Filmography ==
=== Film ===
Year	Title	Role	Notes
2016	American Honey	Star	
2018	The Miseducation of Cameron Post	Jane Fonda	
2018	Hearts Beat Loud	Rose	
2018	Shrimp	Dominatrix	Short film
2018	After Everything	Lindsay	
2019	Daniel Isn't Real	Cassie	
2019	Hellboy	Alice Monaghan	
2021	If I Can't Have Love, I Want Power	The Seer	Music film
2022	How to Blow Up a Pipeline	Theo	Also executive producer
2024	Twisters	Lily	
2026	Corporate Retreat	Lola Price	
2026	The Man I Love	Sherri	
TBA	Deep Eddy	Alicia	Post-production
TBA	Six Till Midnight		Post-production

=== Television ===
Year	Title	Role	Notes
2020	Amazing Stories	Alia	Episode: "Signs of Life"
2020	Utopia	Jessica Hyde	8 episodes
2021	Loki	Hunter C-20	3 episodes
2022	Conversations with Friends	Bobbi	Main role
2023	The Crowded Room	Ariana	Main role

=== Podcast ===
Year	Title	Role
2021	Marvel's Wastelanders: Hawkeye	Ash Barton

=== Music videos ===
Year	Title	Artist	Role
2020	"So Done"	Alicia Keys (featuring Khalid)	Single Girl at prom
2020	"Before You Go"	Lewis Capaldi	Suicidal Woman

== Accolades ==
Year	Association	Category	Nominated work	Result	Ref.
2016	Gotham Awards	Breakthrough Actor	American Honey	Nominated	
2016	British Independent Film Awards	Best Performance by an Actress in a British Independent Film	American Honey	Won	
2016	Indiana Film Journalist Association Awards	Best Actress	American Honey	Nominated	
2016	Indiana Film Journalist Association Awards	Breakout of the Year	American Honey	Runner-up	
2017	Independent Spirit Awards	Best Female Lead	American Honey	Nominated	
