= Ariela Barer =

American actress and screenwriter (born 1998)

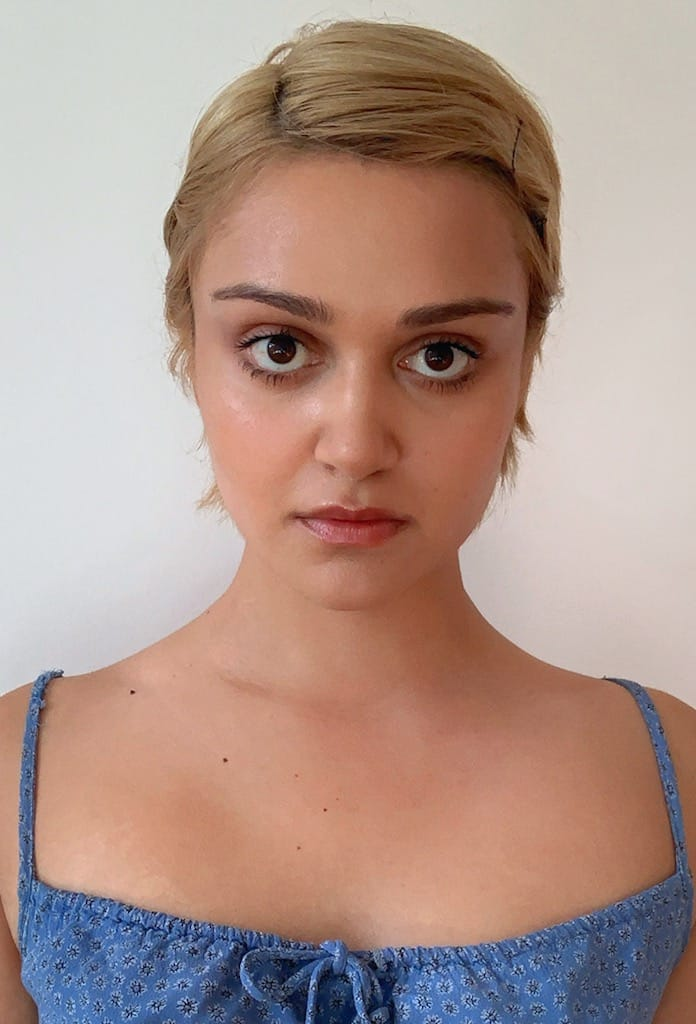
- Born: October 14, 1998 (age 27); Los Angeles, California, U.S.
- Occupations: Actress; screenwriter
- Years active: 2007–present
- Relatives: Libe Barer (sister)

Ariela Barer (born October 14, 1998) is an American actress and filmmaker. She co-wrote, starred in, and produced the 2023 ecological thriller How to Blow Up a Pipeline, based on the Andreas Malm non-fiction book of the same name. The film premiered in competition at the 2022 Toronto International Film Festival and received distribution through Neon. Barer's other film roles include Ladyworld (2018), Disfluency (2021), and See You When I See You (2026).

On television, Barer has played Gert Yorkes in the Hulu original series Marvel's Runaways (2017–2019) and Mel in the HBO post-apocalyptic drama series The Last of Us (2025–present). Her recurring roles include stints on the Netflix comedy-drama series One Day at a Time and Atypical (2017–2018), as well as the Peacock reboot of Saved By the Bell (2021). Additionally, Barer co-starred as Ziggy, the adopted daughter of Katey Sagal's character in the short-lived ABC drama series Rebel (2021). Her older sister is actress Libe Barer.

== Early life ==
Barer was born on October 14, 1998 in Los Angeles, California to Mexican-born Jewish parents. She has stated that her father is a classical composer while her mother is a visual artist and writer who once wrote for a popular comedy radio program in Mexico.

Her older sister is actress Libe Barer, best known for starring in the Amazon Prime Video original series Sneaky Pete (2015–2019).

== Career ==
=== 2007–2016: Child acting ===
Barer began her career in 2007 as a child actor, appearing as Super Martian Robot Girl on season one of the Nickelodeon series Yo Gabba Gabba!. The following year she made guest appearances on the final season of the long-running ABC medical drama ER, and the first season of The CW teen drama series 90210. In 2009 Barer portrayed the younger version of Alyssa Diaz's character Wendy Rojas on the short-lived comedy-drama series Valentine, also on The CW. That same year she had a guest role on the Showtime comedy-drama series Weeds, and made her feature film debut as Sonali Matthews in An American Girl: Chrissa Stands Strong.

The following year she recurred as the younger version of Hannah Simone's character Cece Parekh on the Fox sitcom New Girl. In 2013 Barer co-starred with John Leguizamo in an unaired pilot for ABC called King John. Then, in 2014 she had a string of guest roles on the ABC sitcom Modern Family, the Disney Channel original series I Didn't Do It, and the Amazon Prime Video fantasy series Gortimer Gibbon's Life on Normal Street. The following year Barer went on to make additional guest appearances on the Nickelodeon series The Thundermans, as well as the Disney Channel original series Liv and Maddie and K.C. Undercover.

=== 2017–2021: Breakthrough and Marvel's Runaways ===
2017 proved a breakthrough year for Barer, first gaining attention for her portrayal of Carmen, the goth best friend of Isabella Gomez's character on season one of the Netflix sitcom One Day at a Time. Later that same year, Barer appeared as Bailey Bennett in the Netflix comedy-drama series Atypical and Gert Yorkes in the Hulu original series Marvel's Runaways. Based on the Marvel Comics superhero team of the same name and set in the Marvel Cinematic Universe, the series ran for three seasons before concluding in 2019. In 2018 Barer starred in the feature film Ladyworld, an all-female take on William Golding's 1954 novel Lord of the Flies, co-starring Annalise Basso, Ryan Simpkins, Odessa Adlon, and Maya Hawke. The film screened as part of the 2018 Toronto International Film Festival.

In 2020 Barer appeared as a guest star in season 16 of the long-running ABC medical series Grey's Anatomy. Grey's showrunner Krista Vernoff subsequently cast Barer as a series regular in the 2021 ABC drama series Rebel. Inspired by the life of Erin Brockovich, the series starred Katey Sagal in the titular role and was canceled after one season. That same year Barer was cast in the recurring role of Chloe on the second season of the Peacock reboot of Saved by the Bell. Barer also had supporting roles in the 2021 feature films The Ultimate Playlist of Noise and Disfluency, the latter of which starred her older sister, Libe Barer.

=== 2022–present: How to Blow Up a Pipeline and The Last of Us ===
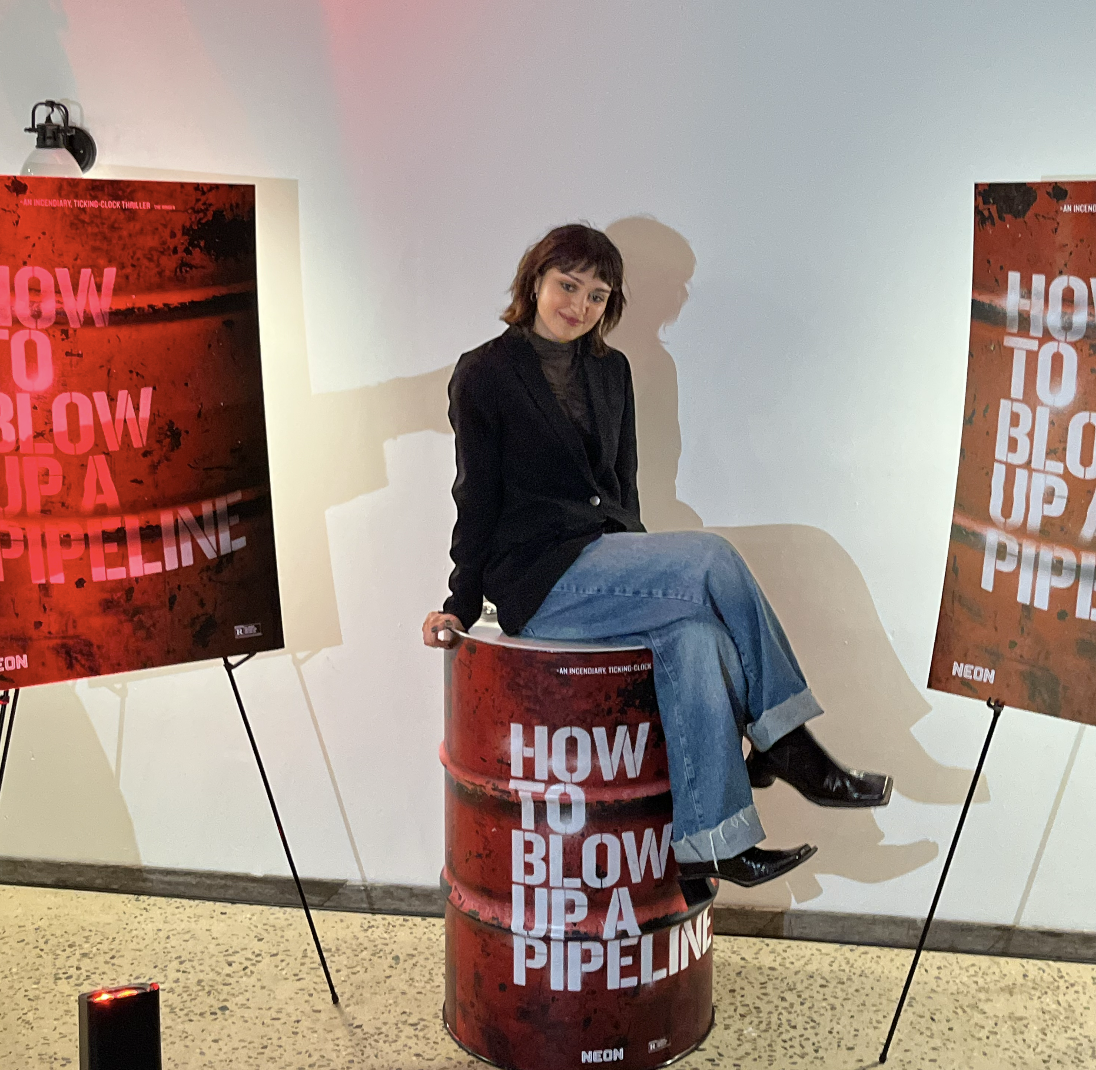
Ariela Barer attends a 2023 screening of How to Blow Up a Pipeline in Brooklyn, New York.

In 2021, Barer began collaborating with director Daniel Goldhaber on adapting Andreas Malm's nonfiction title How to Blow Up a Pipeline as a narrative feature film. According to Barer and Goldhaber, the production of the film spanned 19 months, from conception to completion and premiere. The ensemble of actors featured Barer, Kristine Froseth, Lukas Gage, Forrest Goodluck, Sasha Lane, Jayme Lawson, Marcus Scribner, Jake Weary, and Irene Bedard. The film had its world premiere on September 10, 2022, at the 2022 Toronto International Film Festival, where it was showcased in the Platform Prize program to widespread acclaim. Shortly after the premiere, Neon acquired the distribution rights for North America, with plans for a theatrical release, through negotiations facilitated by CAA Media Finance.

Leading up to its debut at the American Film Market in November 2022, Charades, a French distributor, finalized several distribution agreements for the film. The company then successfully sold the rights to multiple territories, including France (Tandem), the United Kingdom (Vertigo Releasing), German-speaking Switzerland, Austria, Italy, and Germany (Plaion), Benelux (The Searchers), Turkey (Fabula), and Latin America (Impacto). The film made its release in the United States on April 7, 2023, and in the United Kingdom and Ireland on April 21. The film received widespread critical praise and currently holds a score of 95% on the review aggregator website Rotten Tomatoes. How to Blow Up a Pipeline was subsequently included on The Guardian's list of "The Best Films of 2023." Amy Nicholson of the Los Angeles Times included the film on her list of 2024 Academy Awards snubs, specifically in the category of Best Adapted Screenplay.

In March 2024, Barer was cast as Mel in the second season of the HBO post-apocalyptic drama series The Last of Us, based on the video game of the same name. Barer's performance was signaled out by critics as one of the season's stand outs. She was promoted to a series regular for the third season in March 2026.

== Personal life ==
Barer publicly identifies as queer. In addition to acting, she previously served as lead-singer of the Los Angeles-based punk band The Love-Inns.

As of 2022, Barer lives in New York City.

== Filmography ==
=== Film ===
Year	Title	Role	Notes
2009	An American Girl: Chrissa Stands Strong	Sonali Matthews	
2018	Ladyworld	Olivia	
2021	The Ultimate Playlist of Noise	Sarah	
2021	Disfluency	Lacey	
2023	How to Blow Up a Pipeline	Xochitl	Also co-writer and producer
2026	See You When I See You	Camila	
2027	Deep Cuts	Zoe Gutierrez	Filming

=== Television ===
Year	Title	Role	Notes	Ref.
2007	Yo Gabba Gabba!	Super Martian Robot Girl (voice)	Main role 9 episodes	
2008	ER	Jasmine Escalante	Episode: "Life After Death"	
2008	90210	Rana Shirazi	Episode: "Games People Play"	
2009	Valentine	Young Wendy	Episode: "She's Gone"	
2009	Weeds	Scout	Episode: "Perro Insano"	
2011	Keenan's Crush	Samantha	4 episodes	
2012	New Girl	Young Cece Parekh	2 episodes	
2013	King John	Sofie	Unaired ABC pilot	
2014	Modern Family	Sophie	Episode: "And One to Grow On"	
2014	I Didn't Do It	Megan	Episode: "Ball or Nothing"	
2014	Gortimer Gibbon's Life on Normal Street	Esther Pendragon	Episode: "Ranger and the Legend of Pendragon's Gavel"	
2015	Liv and Maddie	Shayna	Episode: "Muffler-A-Rooney"	
2015	The Thundermans	Kylie	Episode: "Exit Stage Theft"	
2016	K.C. Undercover	Alexis McCreery	Episode: "Undercover Mother"	
2017	One Day at a Time	Carmen	4 episodes	
2017–2018	Atypical	Bailey Bennett	7 episodes	
2017–2019	Runaways	Gertrude "Gert" Yorkes	Main role 33 episodes	
2020	Grey's Anatomy	Paula	Episode: "Life on Mars?"	
2021	Rebel	Ziggie	Main role 10 episodes	
2021	Saved by the Bell	Chloe	5 episodes	
2025–present	The Last of Us	Mel	Recurring role (season 2); Main role (season 3); 3 episodes	
