= Daniel Goldhaber =

American director, writer, and producer

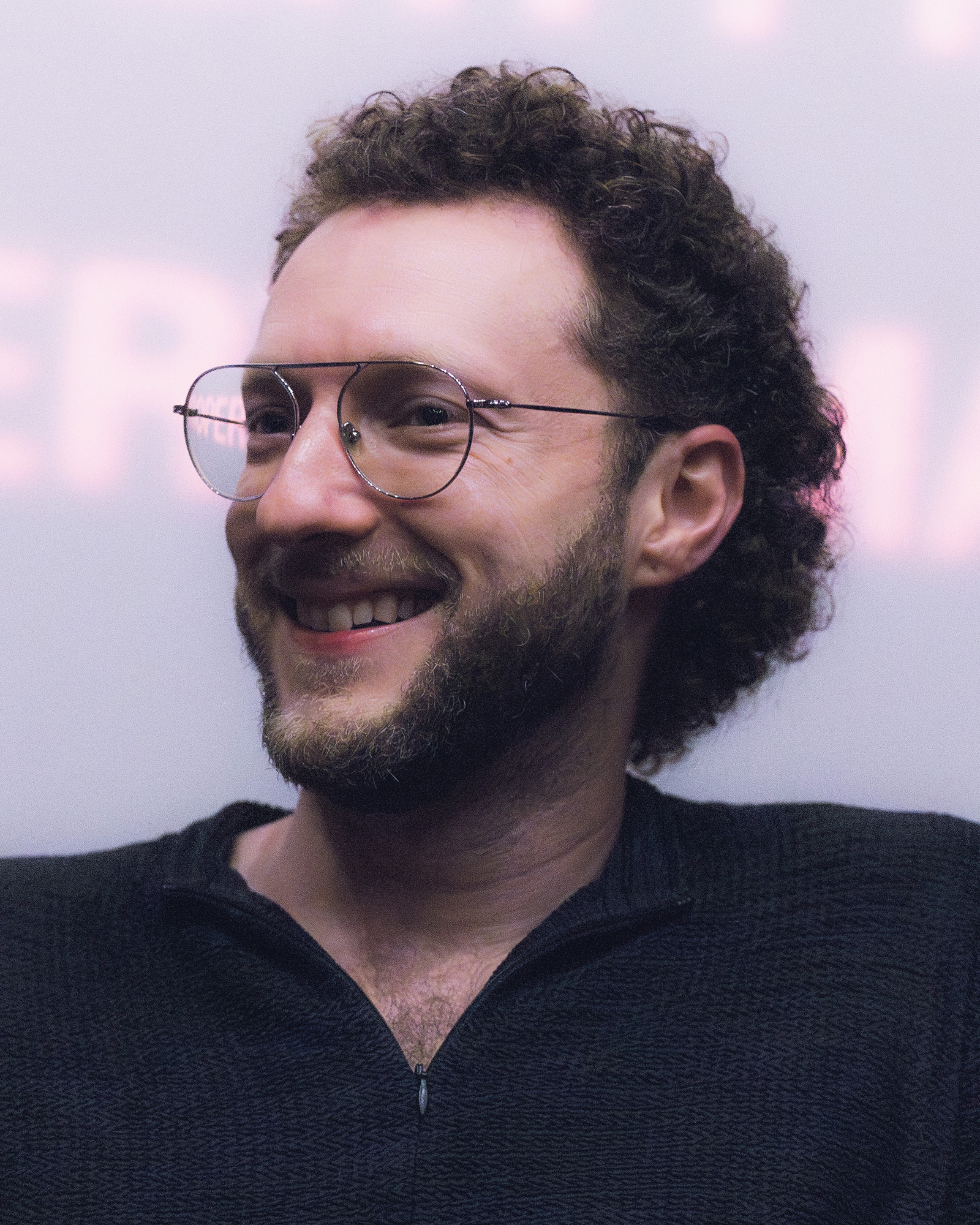
- Goldhaber in 2026
- Born: Boulder, Colorado, U.S.
- Education: Harvard University (BA)
- Occupations: Director, screenwriter, producer
- Known for: Cam, How to Blow Up a Pipeline

Daniel Goldhaber is an American director, screenwriter, and producer. In 2018, he directed Cam, a psychological horror film set in the world of webcam pornography. In 2022, he co-wrote, directed, and produced the thriller film How to Blow Up a Pipeline, based on the book of the same name by Andreas Malm.

== Career ==
Goldhaber grew up in a Jewish family and attended Harvard University where he completed the Visual and Environmental Studies film program. While an undergraduate, he wrote, produced, and directed the 2013 short film Bad Kid, which was selected as a short film of the month by Cinephilia and Beyond. He also worked as an assistant editor on Chasing Ice, the Academy Award-nominated documentary about the Extreme Ice Survey.

Goldhaber's first feature was the 2018 horror film Cam, a Netflix original movie produced by Blumhouse Productions, starring Madeline Brewer. The Guardian called it "an excellent exploration of personas and projection online," and The New York Times said it "upend[ed] the typical thriller trope of the sex worker as helpless victim"

In 2022, he wrote, produced, and directed How to Blow Up a Pipeline, an adaptation of Andreas Malm's 2021 nonfiction Verso book of the same name. The film had its festival premiere in the Platform Prize program at the 2022 Toronto International Film Festival and was released theatrically by Neon in 2023. It stars Ariela Barer, Kristine Froseth, Lukas Gage, Forrest Goodluck, Sasha Lane, Jayme Lawson, Marcus Scribner, Jake Weary, and Irene Bedard.

== Filmography ==
=== Film ===
Feature films

Year	Title	Director	Writer	Producer	Notes
2018	Cam	Yes	Story	No	Directorial debut
2022	How to Blow Up a Pipeline	Yes	Yes	Yes	
2026	Faces of Death	Yes	Yes	No	

Short films

Year	Title	Director	Writer	Producer	Editor
2012	The Summer	Yes	Yes	Yes	Yes
2013	Bad Kid	Yes	Yes	Yes	Yes
2020	In Sudden Darkness	No	No	Executive	No

=== Television ===
Year	Title	Director	Writer	Notes
2020	50 States of Fright	Yes	Yes	Episode: "Red Rum (Colorado)"
