= Lyrical Media =

American independent media company

- Industry: Film; Animation; Television; Video games Graphic novels
- Founded: 2021
- Founder: Alex Black
- Headquarters: Los Angeles, California, U.S.
- Area served: United States
- Divisions: Lyrical Games; Lyrical Animation
- Subsidiaries: Tiny Onion
- Website: lyricalmedia.com

Lyrical Media is an American independent film production company founded in 2021 by Alex Black. The company is best known for producing films Bruiser (2022), How to Blow Up a Pipeline (2022), and Mother, Couch (2023). It also opened its own gaming and animation divisions in 2025.

== History ==
Founded by Alex Black in 2021, the company's first films Bruiser and How to Blow Up a Pipeline had their world premieres at the 2022 Toronto International Film Festival and were acquired by Onyx Collective and Neon, respectively.

On February 2024, Lyrical Media has invested seven figures to James Tynion IV to his production studio Tiny Onion, focusing on the development, packaging, marketing and cross-platform promotion of graphical books as well as spreading beyond into film, television, gaming and even animation. As part of a first-look deal with Ryder Picture Company in May 2024 (now renamed as Embrace in 2026), other projects for the company included Mother, Couch, Elevation, with an adaptation of the short story "Purgatory Games" in development as of 2023.

On June 5, 2025, they start to focus on television projects with their first focusing on the young adult novel series Powerless with Olive Bridge Entertainment and Amazon MGM Studios. In August 4, they launched Lyrical Games a privately funded indie game publisher led by Blake Rochkind. Later that year, on November 17, they acquired Line Mileage and turned them into a division called Lyrical Animation with a focus on adult animation features.

On January 15, 2026, Lyrical Media partners with Tiny Onion to develop two horror films based on the comics of Exquisite Corpses and Room Service.

== Filmography ==
Release date	Title	Distribution/Co-Production	Notes
February 24, 2023	Bruiser	Onyx Collective; Hulu; Ryder Picture Company; Silent R Management; Toula67 Entertainment	Streaming film
April 7, 2023	How to Blow Up a Pipeline	Neon; Chrono; Spacemaker Productions	Based on the book of the same name by Andreas Malm
July 5, 2024	Mother, Couch	Film Movement; Memory; Film i Väst; Snowglobe; Fat City; Suris/Bishop Films	Based on the 2020 Swedish novel by Jerker Virdborg
November 8, 2024	Elevation	Vertical; Grinder Monkey; John Glenn Entertainment	
June 19, 2026	The Death of Robin Hood	A24; Ryder Picture Company	Based on 17th-century ballad Robin Hood's Death by Anonymous
September 4, 2026	Onslaught	A24; Ryder Picture Company; Breakaway Civilization; 828 Productions	

=== Upcoming/In Development ===
Release date	Title	Distribution/Co-Production	Ref(s)
2026	The Young People	Neon; Phobos; Range	
2027	Butcher & Blackbird	Amazon MGM Studios; Embrace	
TBA	Funny Story	Netflix; Embrace	
TBA	The Troop	Paramount Pictures; Paramount Primal	

=== Television ===
Release date(s)	Title	Network/Co-Production	Ref(s)
TBA	Powerless	Amazon MGM Studios; Olive Bridge Entertainment	

== Lyrical Animation ==
Lyrical Animation, originally known as Line Mileage, is an American animation studio and division of Lyrical Media, founded by Jacob Robinson on November 2025.

=== Filmography ===
Release date	Title	Distribution/Co-Production	Ref(s)
2028	Godslap	Meatier Productions; Powerhouse Animation Studios	
TBA	Death Stranding: Mosquito (Working Title)	Kojima Productions; ABC Animation	
TBA	Hell Followed with Us	Powerhouse Animation Studios	
TBA	Bloodborne	Columbia Pictures (under Sony Pictures Releasing); PlayStation Productions	

=== Television ===
Release date(s)	Title	Network/Co-Production	Ref(s)
TBA	Untitled RuneScape series	Meatier Productions; Jagex	

== Lyrical Games ==
Lyrical Games is an American video game studio founded by Blake Rochkind in 2025.

=== Published ===
Release date	Title	Developer	Platforms	Ref(s)
October 13, 2026	Valor Mortis	One More Level	PC, PlayStation 5, Xbox Series X/S	
2026	Erosion	Plot Twist	PC, PlayStation 5, Xbox Series X/S	
TBA	Untitled game	Blackbird Interactive	TBA	
TBA	Untitled game	The Chinese Room	TBA	
