= Tyre Extinguishers =

Direct action group against SUVs

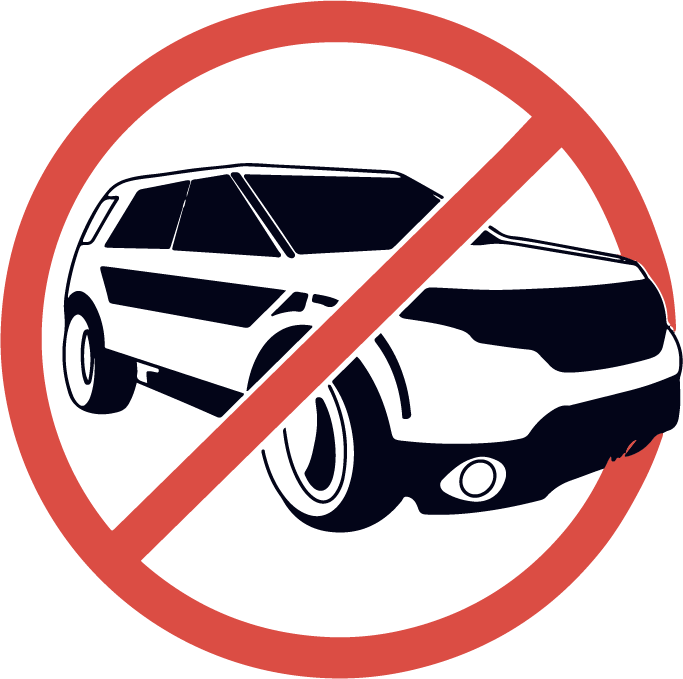
- Formation: 2021; 5 years ago
- Location: Europe, United States, Canada, Australia, New Zealand
- Methods: Direct action
- Fields: Road safety Climate movement
- Website: tyreextinguishers.com (defunct)

Tyre Extinguishers was an international climate direct action group which deflated the tyres on sport utility vehicles (SUVs). The group described driving an SUV as "among the worst single actions that one can take in terms of its climate impacts and its adverse effects on public safety", with SUVs having a disproportionately large impact on the climate crisis relative to other vehicles, worsening air pollution and being more likely to kill pedestrians than smaller sedan cars. The group had called for a ban on SUVs in cities, and had said that they "want to make it impossible to own a huge polluting 4x4 in the world’s urban areas".

The group suggested inserting a piece of gravel, lentil or other small object to depress the pin on the valve cap of an SUV's tyre, so that the tyre deflates slowly over time. The activists left leaflets under the vehicles' windscreen wipers "so that the owner is aware that the car is unusable and gets an explanation as to why this has been done".

In October 2026 the group announced its closure on social media, after being in operation for four and a half years.

== Activities ==
Between 7 March 2022 and July 2022, the group claimed to have deflated over 5000 tyres of SUVs worldwide, including areas of London, Cambridge, Brighton and Hove, Bristol, Edinburgh, Liverpool and Sheffield, the Swiss city of Zurich, the German cities of Essen and Dortmund, the Swedish city Gothenburg, in the New Zealand cities of Auckland, Christchurch and Wellington, and in Los Angeles.

Several Tyre Extinguishers splinter groups formed in Scottish cities including Dundee (The Dundeeflators) and Glasgow (The Deflationists).

In July 2022, the group's further actions in the United States took place in New York City, Chicago, Scranton, Pennsylvania and the San Francisco Bay Area. The group claimed its first actions in Canada (Waterloo, Ontario) and France (Paris) the same month.

On one night in September 2022, the group deflated tyres on over 600 SUVs in the UK, France, Germany, Switzerland, the Netherlands, Norway, Denmark, the Czech Republic and Canada. The group claimed these were its debut actions in Denmark, Norway and the Czech Republic.

In October 2022, the organisation claimed to have reached its initial target of 10,000 SUVs deflated since March 2022, with the actions taking place across 15 countries. The group described Australia as its "next big target" in May 2023.

In August 2023 Tyre Extinguishers claimed responsibility for an "independent cell" of their group that had used power drills to puncture the tyres of more than 60 SUVs at a car dealership in Exeter, England. The group described the act as a "necessary escalation", and a retaliation to an incident the previous month where a Land Rover had broken through a fence and killed two schoolchildren.

In October 2023, the group announced its first action in Riga, Latvia, claiming this was the 20th country with active Tyre Extinguisher groups.

== Organisation ==
The name "Tyre Extinguishers" began appearing in 2021, but the group's actions did not begin until March 2022. In 2007, a Swedish group called "The Indians of the Asphalt Jungle" had embraced the same tactic, deflating over 1,500 SUVs (according to its own numbers) and, as reported by Vice, "helping to send the usually relentless growth of domestic SUV sales into a rare reverse".

The group was described by Aston University academics Oscar Berglund and Graeme Hayes as a "pop-up climate movement", given the group's emphasis on individuals or small groups taking action wherever they are using the materials on the Tyre Extinguishers website, rather than a more centralised structure.

Lund University professor Andreas Malm (whose book How to Blow Up a Pipeline argues in favour of the sabotage of fossil fuel infrastructure as a form of environmental activism, and who the Tyre Extinguishers have cited as an inspiration) called the group's actions a form of "extremely peaceful and gentle sabotage". Malm continued, "anyone can deflate an SUV: it is virtually child's play. It requires no formal organization, no leadership, no funds, no implements other than bits of gravel or beans or green lentils. Given the infinitely replicable nature of the action - sabotage as meme - its potential for making SUV ownership less convenient and attractive could not be discounted".

Separate groups have begun to use similar tactics, such as a group called Reclaim Our Communities in Bristol, UK, which deflated tyres on more than 100 SUVs and 4x4s in the city in October 2023.

In October 2026 the Tyre Extinguishers X account announced that the group were "bowing out" and taking their website offline, and would "continue their work, in other struggles".

== Legality ==
The group claims to have faced no legal issues, and has said that it understood police forces in the United Kingdom to be "divided" on whether it was a crime to let the air out of a tyre.

Journalists have described the actions as criminal and authorities in certain regions have encouraged witnesses to come forward with information. In the U.S., Car and Driver magazine noted "State laws against 'tampering with a motor vehicle' are likely to be enforceable, but of course, first the person would have to be caught in the act of letting the air out of the tires".

In Singapore in 2025, a man was found guilty of committing mischief after deflating the tyres of seven vehicles in a car park in Woodlands. He was fined S$3,000 (US$2,300) after voluntarily compensating the victims for damages related to re-inflating the tyres and writing a letter of apology.
