= Powerless =

Powerless or powerlessness may refer to:

- lack of social power or influence
- lack of physical power or strength

In media the term may refer to:

- Powerless (comics), a 2004 Marvel Comics six-issue limited series published by Marvel Comics featuring Spider-Man, Wolverine and Daredevil in a world where they don't have superpowers
- Powerless (TV series), an American television show that premiered on NBC in 2017
- "Powerless" (Heroes), a 2007 television episode
- "Powerless" (Shameless), a 2009 television episode
- Powerless, 2010 album by Elkie Brooks
- Powerless, the pre-release name for the 2011 album I Am the Club Rocker by Inna
- "Powerless" (Linkin Park song), a single by Linkin Park from the album Living Things
- "Powerless" (Rudimental song), 2014 single by Rudimental
- "Powerless (Say What You Want)", a song by Nelly Furtado
- Powerless (novel), a 2023 romantic fantasy novel
