= Holly Jean Buck =

American Sociologist

- Citizenship: American
- Education: Cornell University, Lund University, University of Maryland, Baltimore County
- Awards: MacArthur Fellows Program
- Scientific career
- Fields: Sociology
- Workplaces: University at Buffalo
- Website: www.geo.design

Holly Jean Buck is an American sociologist and energy policy researcher. She is currently an associate professor in the Department of Environment & Sustainability at the University of Buffalo in Buffalo, New York.

Buck received her Ph.D. in Development Sociology from Cornell University in 2017.

In 2021, Buck published the book Ending Fossil Fuels: Why Net Zero is Not Enough, which details why the push to increase clean energy supplies is not enough to address climate change. The London School of Economics published an excerpt of the book on their blog, the LSE Review of Books.

Buck is also the author of the 2019 book, After geoengineering: Climate tragedy, repair, and restoration. She also coedited the 2020 book Has it come to this? The promise and peril of geoengineering on the brink with Andreas Malm and J. P. Sapinski. Buck is also a part of the Working Group III contribution to the Intergovernmental Panel on Climate Change's Sixth Assessment Report.

In 2026, Buck was named a Macarthur Fellow.
