= Fort Worth Intelligence Exchange =

Fusion center in Fort Worth, Texas

- Abbreviation: FW INTEX

Agency overview
- Formed: August 2019

Jurisdictional structure
- Federal agency: United States
- Operations jurisdiction: United States
- Primary governing body: Government of Texas
- Secondary governing body: United States Government
- General nature: Federal law enforcement

Operational structure
- Parent agency: Fort Worth Police Department Intelligence Section

Website
- https://fwintex.org/

The Fort Worth Intelligence Exchange (FW INTEX) is a fusion center housed within the Fort Worth Police Department.

== Establishment ==
The Fort Worth Intelligence Exchange was established in August 2019 by Greg Abbott, the Governor of Texas, as a unit within the Intelligence Section of the Fort Worth Police Department. At the time of its formation, it was the eighth fusion center in Texas and the 80th in the United States.

=== Governance ===
While fusion centers are technically governed by the laws of the states in which they are located, they are designed for federal sharing of intelligence and collaborate closely with the Department of Homeland Security.

== Activity ==
As a fusion center, the Fort Worth Intelligence Exchange prepares and releases "situational awareness bulletins" relating to potential threats. These bulletins are shared nationwide.

=== Notable activity ===
From December 2019 through March 2020, "INTEX Monthly" reports produced by the Fort Worth Intelligence Exchange detailed the presence of the Aryan Circle, a neo-Nazi gang, throughout Texas. The reports were leaked in 2020 by Distributed Denial of Secrets as a part of BlueLeaks; the leaks also revealed that FW INTEX was monitoring the Boogaloo movement and an incarcerated population of sovereign citizens.

On June 2, 2020, FW INTEX released an officer safety bulletin profiling a 16-year-old who had vaguely threatened to drive their truck into a Black Lives Matter protest; the dossier included information as specific as the teen's weight, height, and eye color.

On January 7, 2021, FW INTEX identified Texas couple Mark and Jalise Middleton as participants in the 2021 United States Capitol attack a day earlier, sending a report to the FBI. The identification was made using the Middletons' own posts on social media, in which they discussed their presence and actions during the attack, and posted photos of themselves at the scene.

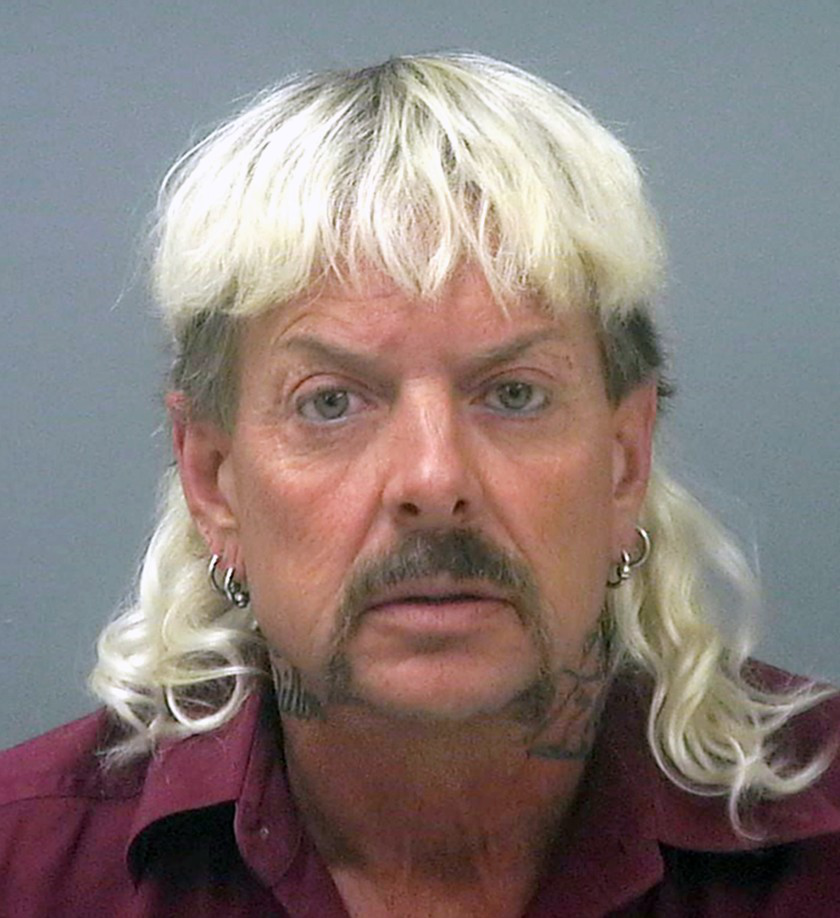
FW INTEX investigated an alleged plot to break Joe Exotic out of jail

Prior to February 2021, FW INTEX investigated an alleged plot to break Joe Exotic out of jail after the release of the Netflix documentary series Tiger King.

In October 2021, FW INTEX shared a bulletin on the book How to Blow Up a Pipeline by environmentalist and author Andreas Malm after Malm was a guest on The New Yorker Radio Hour. The bulletin, which detailed concerns about Malm's rhetoric while acknowledging that it was not linked with any known threat, nevertheless described the book as a "medium threat" to the local community. The document was obtained and published by watchdog group Property of the People; Politico quoted a former Federal Bureau of Investigation counterterrorism agent as saying that it was troubling because fusion centers "shouldn’t be writing book reviews and shouldn’t mention a book if it isn’t specifically tied to some sort of criminal act".
