= Zetkin Collective =

Activist group in Sweden

- Formation: 2018; 7 years ago
- Founded at: Sweden
- Key people: Andreas Malm, William Callison, George Edwards, Ståle Holgersen, Jacob McLean, Tatjana Söding, Bernadette Barth, Lise Benoist

The Zetkin Collective is a research group made up of activists and academics. It focuses on analyzing and explaining the political ecology of the far-right, including ecofascism and Malthusianism as well as climate change denial and eco-nationalism. The group began within the human ecology department of Lund University in Sweden.

The collective is named after Clara Zetkin, a German Marxist theorist who studied the Italian fascist movement in 1923. Its work draws on the definition of fascism created by Zetkin.

The collective authored the book White Skin, Black Fuel: On the Danger of Fossil Fascism, which was published by Verso Press. In 2020, the French-language edition Fascisme fossile: L'extrême droite, l'énergie, le climat was published by La Fabrique and named a book of the day by Philosophie Magazine.
