= Mother, Couch =

2023 film by Niclas Larsson

- Theatrical release poster
- Directed by: Niclas Larsson
- Written by: Niclas Larsson
- Based on: Mamma i soffa by Jerker Virdborg
- Produced by: Ella Bishop; Pau Suris; Alex Black; Sara Murphy
- Starring: Ewan McGregor; Rhys Ifans; Taylor Russell; Lara Flynn Boyle; Lake Bell; F. Murray Abraham; Ellen Burstyn
- Cinematography: Chayse Irvin
- Edited by: Carla Luffe
- Music by: Christopher Bear
- Production companies: Lyrical Media; Film i Väst; Snowglobe; Fat City; Suris/Bishop Films
- Distributed by: Film Movement; Memory
- Release dates: September 9, 2023 (TIFF); July 5, 2024 (United States)
- Running time: 96 minutes
- Countries: United States; Denmark; Sweden
- Language: English
- Box office: $50,163

Mother, Couch is a 2023 comedy-drama film written and directed by Niclas Larsson. It is based on the 2020 Swedish novel Mamma i soffa by Jerker Virdborg. It stars Ewan McGregor, Rhys Ifans, Taylor Russell, Lara Flynn Boyle, Lake Bell, F. Murray Abraham, and Ellen Burstyn.

The film premiered at the Toronto International Film Festival on September 9, 2023. It was released in the United States by Film Movement and Memory on July 5, 2024.

== Premise ==
While attempting to leave a furniture store, an elderly matriarch suddenly decides to sit on one of the couches and stay there. Her three children come together, as well as the store owners, who all go through a mind-bending journey of self-discovery.

== Cast ==
- Ewan McGregor as David
- Rhys Ifans as Gruffudd
- Taylor Russell as Bella
- Ellen Burstyn as Mother
- Lara Flynn Boyle as Linda
- F. Murray Abraham as Marcus / Marco
- Lake Bell as Anne

== Production ==
In July 2022, it was reported that Ellen Burstyn, Ewan McGregor, Taylor Russell, Rhys Ifans, Lara Flynn Boyle, Lake Bell, and F. Murray Abraham had signed on to star in Mother, Couch. Written and directed by Niclas Larsson in his feature film debut, it is an adaptation of the 2020 Swedish novel Mamma i soffa by Jerker Virdborg. Larsson said in an interview: "The book is very different from the film. In fact, the first thing I asked Jerker was how free I could be with the adaptation, and he said, 'Look, steal whatever you want to steal, and go with it.' So that's what I did. I added the locations and set it in America, but I feel it's also very Swedish."

The film was produced by the American-based companies Lyrical Media, Fat City, and Suris/Bishop Films and co-produced by Sweden's Film i Väst and Denmark's Snowglobe. Principal photography began in late October 2022 and took place in Charlotte, North Carolina, over 27 days, primarily on a stage. The production was granted a tax rebate of up to $1.75 million by the North Carolina Department of Commerce.

== Release ==
Mother, Couch had its world premiere at the Toronto International Film Festival on September 9, 2023. It later screened at the San Sebastián International Film Festival on September 26. In February 2024, Film Movement and Memory acquired US distribution rights to the film. It was released in the United States on July 5, 2024.

== Reception ==
On the review aggregator website Rotten Tomatoes, 41% of 51 critics' reviews are positive. The website's consensus reads: "Despite terrific performances, Mother, Couch is one of those finds that are hard to put together and never quite look like the picture on the box." Metacritic, which uses a weighted average, assigned the film a score of 59 out of 100, based on seven critics, indicating "mixed or average" reviews.
