= Valor Mortis =

- Developer: One More Level
- Publisher: Lyrical Games
- Director: Radosław Ratusznik
- Composers: Oskar Bala; Arkadiusz Reikowski
- Platforms: PlayStation 5; Windows; Xbox Series X/S
- Release: October 13, 2026
- Genre: Action role-playing
- Mode: Single-player

Valor Mortis is a 2026 action role-playing game developed by One More Level and published by Lyrical Games. It was released for PlayStation 5, Windows and Xbox Series X/S on October 13, 2026.

== Gameplay ==
Valor Mortis is a Soulslike action role-playing video game played from a first-person perspective. It is set in an alternate 19th century Eastern Europe where Napoleon's endless war has unleashed a supernatural plague. The game follows William, a French soldier in the Grande Armée resurrected by Napoleon, as he fights to survive against his former comrades who have now turned into undead monsters and unravels the mysteries and conspiracies behind the plague and his own resurrection.

William's primary weapon is a cutlass. To avoid damage, players can block incoming attacks at the cost of a small amount of health, dodge unblockable attacks, or parry at the right timing to deal devastating damage to enemies. He is also equipped with a flintlock pistol, which can be used to target enemies' weak points and stagger them, though ammunition is scarce. As William progresses, he gains access to magical abilities known as "transmutations", allowing him to perform feats such as unleashing bursts of flame on enemies. Players earn "Catalysts" throughout the game, which can be used to upgrade William's stats, stamina, and health. If William is defeated in battle, he will respawn at his last checkpoint (represented as lanterns in the game), though all unused Catalysts are dropped at the site of death.

== Plot ==
In an alternate history where Napoleon Bonaparte won the Battle of Waterloo, he begins marching his vast armies through Europe to unify the entire continent under his rule. A soldier in Napoleon's army, William Dowsett, apparently awakens from death to find he now wields supernatural abilities. He also discovers some type of plague has begun sweeping across the land, and that Napoleon's army has become a horde of undead monsters. He also hears Napoleon's voice in his head attempting to direct him, while another voice from a rebel leader called the Shrike tries to convince William to turn against Napoleon. He eventually meets a mysterious man named Lucjan Skawinski, who directs him to find his surviving comrades and continually provides him assistance throughout his journey.

William reunites with two of his friends, James Stewart and Louis Moreau, who have survived the plague. Louis directs William to investigate a nearby salt mine, where he finds a mysterious, sealed door. Upon learning about the door, Louis then directs William to head to the university at a nearby city to retrieve his research notes. Arriving in the city, William witnesses the destruction and atrocities Napoleon has committed in the course of his war, and grows increasingly disillusioned. The Shrike helps William enter the university so he can discover the truth for himself. Heading below the university, William discovers a lab where Napoleon's scientists, led by Louis, were researching a mysterious substance called Nephtoglobin which has the power to bring the dead back to life. Tempted by the power of Nephtoglobin, Napoleon forced his soldiers, including William, to imbibe it, turning them into undead abominations and spreading the plague. William ended up being one of the rare few individuals who managed to retain his humanity after the transformation process.

William returns Louis' notes to him, and he informs him that a relic will be needed for William to open the door in the salt mine. William then heads to a fortress Napoleon seized and recovers the relic, absorbing its power. However, he falls unconscious in the process and is captured and brought to Napoleon. Upon the urging from his emissary Mary, Napoleon decides to spare William's life for the time being and imprisons him. Mary later frees William, revealing herself as the true identity of the Shrike as she urges William to put a stop to Napoleon's plans. He tries to reunite with James and Louis, only to find out both of his friends had abandoned him and fled. Disillusioned once more, William returns to the door and opens it.

Entering the door, William finds himself in an otherworldly realm where he battles a doppelganger of himself, only known as the "Entity". He defeats the Entity and absorbs its power. Afterwards, William narrates that he will keep fighting for peace, even if it only lasts for a brief time, while Napoleon continues to march through Europe with his undead army.

== Development ==
Valor Mortis was developed by One More Level, which is based in Poland. The team used their experience working on first-person games (Ghostrunner and its sequel, Ghostrunner 2), and applied it on the Soulslike genre. While the game features firearms, it was not intended to be played as a first-person shooter. The team first decided on the core gameplay formula (a three-way mix between melee combat, ranged combat and magical abilities), before determining the game's setting. According to game director Radosław Ratusznik, "the theme of horror is very important" in both its monster design and its story, and the game tells a "universal story about soldiers in the war". The team also drew inspirations from Metroidvania games, in which players can use newly unlocked abilities to discover new pathways and shortcuts.

Private Division, the independent game label of Take-Two Interactive, was originally set to publish the game. After the publishing deal was terminated as Take-Two pivoted its strategy to focus on premium games, the team signed with Lyrical Games, which was founded in March 2025 by film studio Lyrical Media with the intention of publishing premium independent games. The game was officially revealed Valor Mortis in August 2025 during Gamescom Opening Night Live. A public playtest of the game was held from October 6 to October 13, 2025. A demo was made available on Steam on June 7, 2026. It was also announced in June 2026 that Vincent Cassel would voice for Napoleon Bonaparte in the game. Originally set to be released on September 24, 2026 for PlayStation 5, Windows and Xbox Series X/S, it was delayed to October 13, 2026 to avoid competing with titles that set to be release throughout September due to avoidance on Grand Theft Auto VI.

== Reception ==
Reception

Aggregate scores
Aggregator	Score
Metacritic	PC: 78/100; PS5: 79/100
OpenCritic	84% recommend

Review scores
Publication	Score
Eurogamer	4/5
GameSpot	6/10
IGN	7/10
Push Square	8/10
Shacknews	8/10

Valor Mortis received "generally favorable" reviews from critics, according to review aggregator Metacritic. OpenCritic determined that 84% of critics recommended the game.
