= How to Blow Up a Pipeline =

2021 nonfiction book by Andreas Malm

How to Blow Up a Pipeline: Learning to Fight in a World on Fire
- Author: Andreas Malm
- Publisher: Verso Books
- Publication date: January 5, 2021
- Pages: 208
- ISBN: 1-839-76025-7
- Dewey Decimal: 363
- LC Class: TD170 .M34 2021

How to Blow Up a Pipeline: Learning to Fight in a World on Fire is a nonfiction book written by Andreas Malm and published in 2021 by Verso Books. In the book, Malm argues that sabotage is a logical form of climate activism, and criticizes both pacifism within the climate movement and "climate fatalism" outside it. The book inspired a film of the same name.

Andreas Malm, a lecturer in human ecology at Lund University, wrote several other books on related subjects before his release of How to Blow Up a Pipeline. Prior to events in 2018 and 2019 including Fridays For Future and climate protest camps in Europe, the book was planned to be an argument that there was a lack of climate activism. These events caused the argument to become a critique of nonviolence and pacifism in the climate activist movement, and an argument for sabotage as a logical form of climate activism.

The book received both positive and negative reviews in various publications.

== Background ==
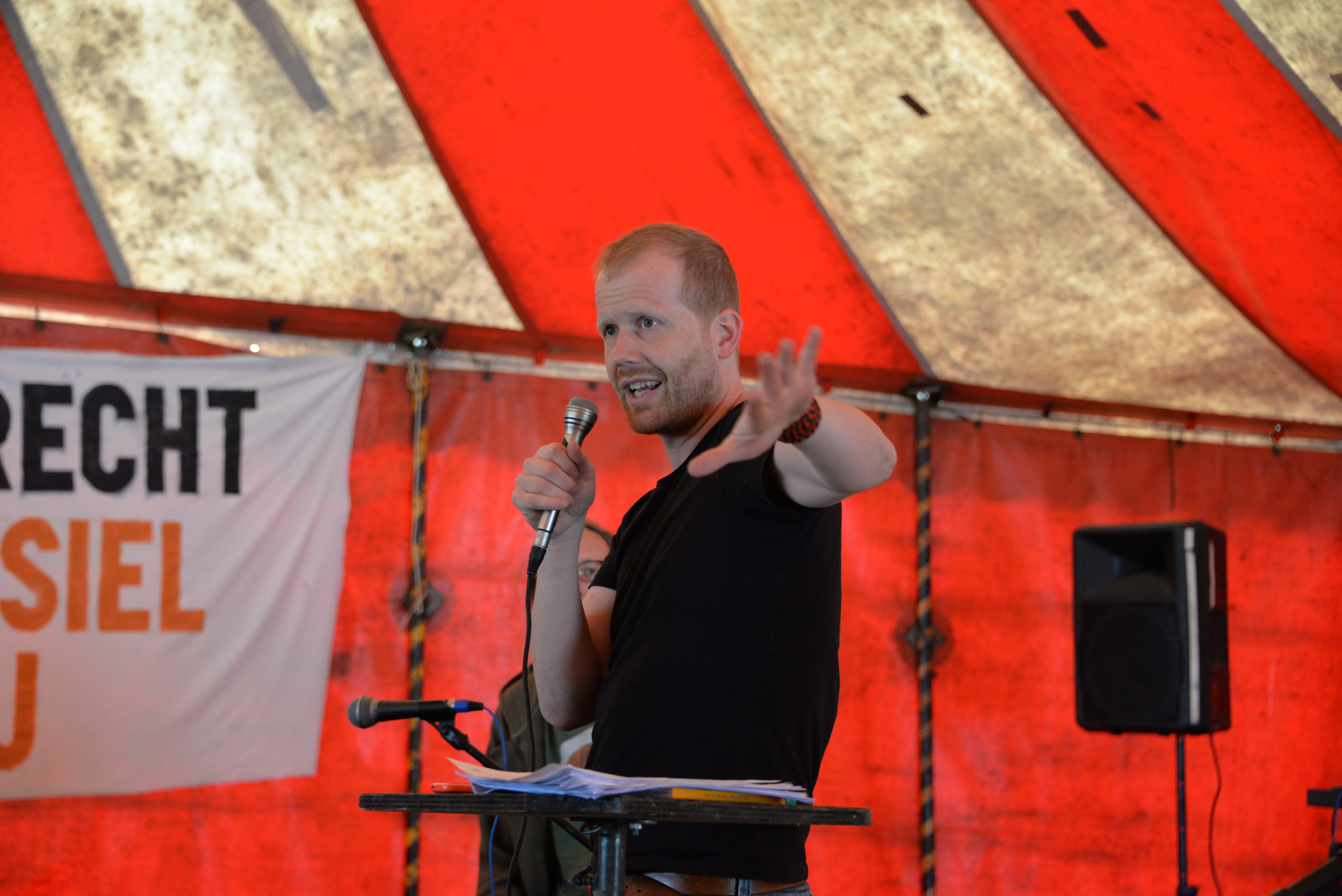
Andreas Malm giving a lecture at Code Rood Action Camp 2018 in Groningen

Before the release of How to Blow Up a Pipeline, author Andreas Malm had written several other books related to political economy, climate change, and fossil fuels; all were published by Verso Books. As of the book's publication, he was a lecturer in the human ecology department of Lund University.

Malm told Bookforum that he had been studying Ancient Egypt in the first half of 2018, but stopped spending time on that research later that year because he felt a need to focus on climate change, stating that he "was in total despair mode". When he began work on How to Blow Up a Pipeline, he expected to argue that there was a lack of climate activism. However, after the start of Fridays For Future in 2018 and the spread of climate protest camps in Germany and throughout Europe in 2019, Malm described feeling "elated and encouraged by the wave of activism" but frustrated by the climate movement's "strict commitment to absolute nonviolence". The book instead became a critique of nonviolence and pacifism within the movement, and an argument that sabotage is a logical form of climate activism.

How to Blow Up a Pipeline was published on January 5, 2021, by Verso Books.

== Synopsis ==
The book is divided into three chapters, titled Learning from Past Struggles, Breaking the Spell, and Fighting Despair. It also includes a preface.

=== Learning from Past Struggles ===
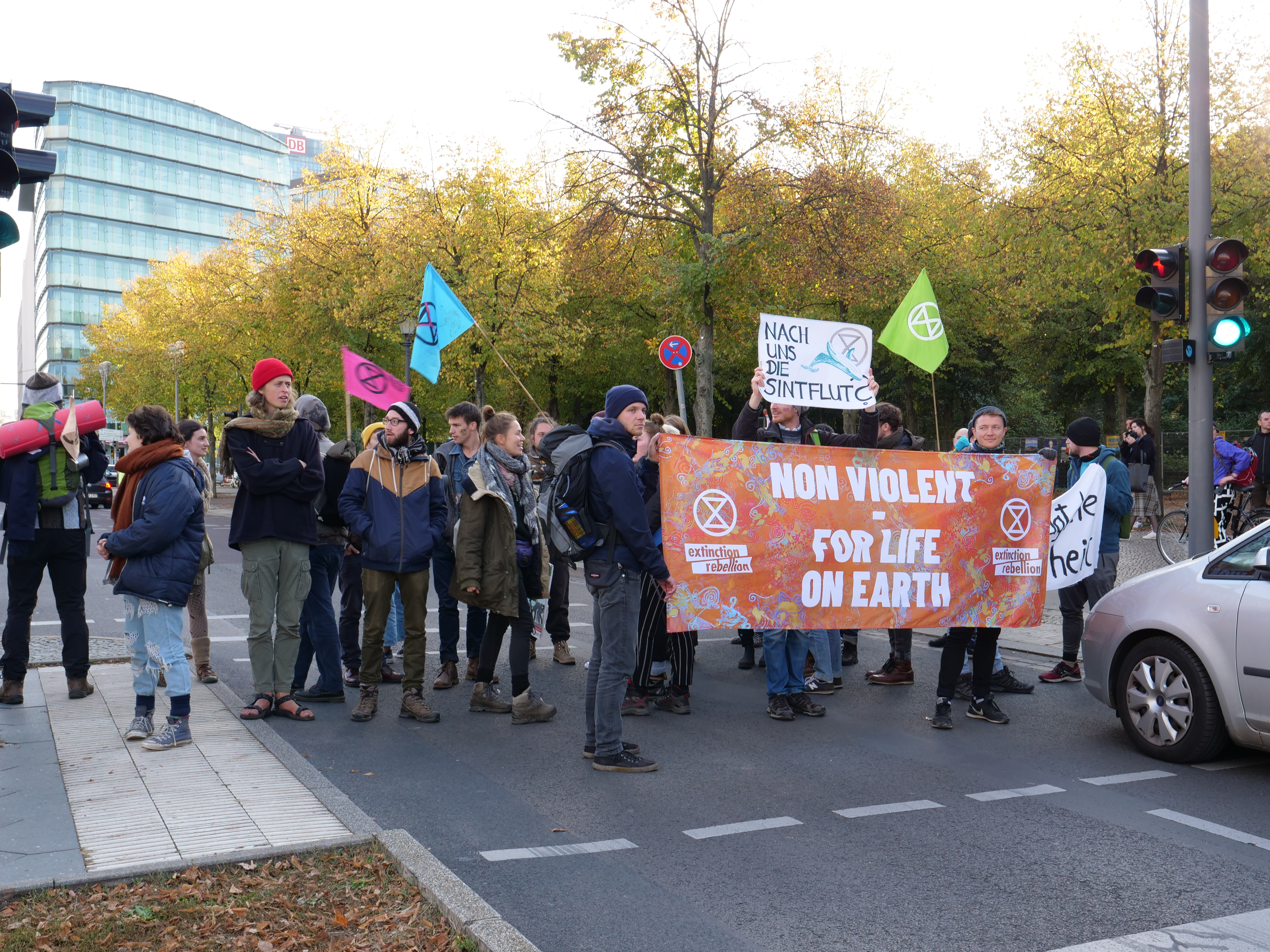
Extinction Rebellion protesters block Ebertstraße in October 2019 with a banner that reads "Non Violent – For Life On Earth".

In the first chapter, Malm describes a protest in which he participated outside the COP1 United Nations climate conference in 1995. He asks "At what point do we escalate?", stating that the modern climate movement has remained committed to "absolute non-violence" and avoided property destruction. He criticizes what he defines as "moral pacifism" for failing to account for defensive violence and argues that "strategic pacifism" as advocated by Bill McKibben and Extinction Rebellion is ahistorical, discussing the radical flank effect in the context of the civil rights movement and questioning whether there are "convincing reasons" to believe that "the struggle against fossil fuels ... will succeed only on condition of utter peacefulness".

=== Breaking the Spell ===
In the second chapter, Malm states that the ruling class will not implement sufficient change to address climate change, and that the climate movement should sabotage devices that produce CO_{2} emissions in order to discourage new investment in them. He references a 2005 report by the Pipeline and Gas Journal which described pipelines as "very easily sabotaged", and he describes a "long and venerable tradition of sabotaging fossil fuel infrastructure", referencing instances of sabotage in apartheid South Africa, by Palestinians, and in Nigeria among other examples. Malm questions why actions like this are not taken for the purposes of the climate, attributing that fact to the "general demise of revolutionary politics" and the "insufficient politicisation of the climate crisis". He characterizes property destruction as a type of violence but states that "we must insist on it being different in kind from the violence that hits a human (or an animal) in the face", subsequently arguing that violence "which hits material conditions necessary for subsistence" should be considered violence against people.

=== Fighting Despair ===
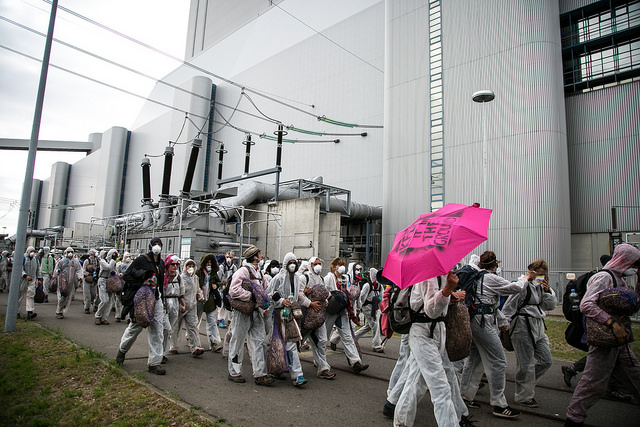
Activists at the Schwarze Pumpe power station during Ende Gelände 2016

In the third and final chapter, Malm argues against critics of collective climate activism like Jonathan Franzen and Roy Scranton, who Malm says are united by "a reification of despair", which he states is "an eminently understandable emotional response to the crisis, but unserviceable as a response for a politics in it". He describes this "climate fatalism" as a contradiction and a self-fulfilling prophecy, writing that "[the] more people who tell us that a radical reorientation is 'scarcely imaginable', the less imaginable it will be". He says that there is no scientific basis for the idea that action now will not have an effect on climate change, stating that people who "think that mitigation is meaningful only at a time when damage is yet to be done ... have misunderstood the basics of both climate science and movement". Malm describes Ende Gelände 2016, during which he and other activists blockaded the Schwarze Pumpe power station, writing that politicians and the media described the action as violent because the activists broke fences. He quotes The Wretched of the Earth by Frantz Fanon, stating that Fanon wrote violence "frees the native 'from his despair and inaction; it makes him fearless and restores his self-respect'". He concludes that "There has been a time for a Gandhian climate movement; perhaps there might come a time for a Fanonian one. The breaking of fences may one day be seen as a very minor misdemeanour indeed."

== Cover ==
The cover of How to Blow Up a Pipeline, designed by Chantal Jahchan, appeared as one of 12 on a list of "The Best Book Covers of 2021" assembled by Matt Dorfman, art director of The New York Times Book Review. It was additionally chosen by The Bookseller as one of the best covers of January 2021.

== Reception ==
=== Reviews ===
Journalist Wen Stephenson praised How to Blow Up a Pipeline in the Los Angeles Review of Books, describing Malm's approach as "erudite and, above all, morally serious" and stating that the book "methodically dismantles the social movement doctrine of 'strategic nonviolence'". He wrote that he expected the book to be dismissed by many as fringe or dangerous, but described that potential dismissal as "a very serious mistake". Also in the Los Angeles Review of Books, Scott W. Stern wrote that Malm "makes a stirring moral case for the necessity of escalation" and described the book as "passionate, powerful, deeply flawed, and profoundly necessary", stating that it "may excite some readers, anger others, convince still others, and alienate many, but it is unlikely to be forgotten by a single one".

Writing in The New York Times Book Review, Tatiana Schlossberg reviewed How to Blow Up a Pipeline as "compelling but frustrating", writing that violence is problematic because "ultimately it's impossible to control" and noting that the book did not actually include instructions for creating explosions.

In a negative review in Canadian Dimension, a left-wing magazine, James Wilt criticized the book for not discussing the potential repercussions of sabotage, describing that omission as "an astonishing abdication of responsibility". Wilt wrote that "to advocate for [property destruction] without any mention or planning for the inevitable backlash, particularly outside of situations of armed conflict, is to do the work of the carceral state for it".

In another negative review in Jacobin, an American socialist magazine, Chris Maisano criticized the book for assuming that political violence could be controlled, saying that it "has a fundamentally interactive quality that Malm largely fails to account for, and under conditions of intense political contestation, it is all too easy to move from advocating violence against property to violence against people."

=== By notable figures ===
A review by Tim DeChristopher in YES! Magazine said that How to Blow Up a Pipeline "offers a humble and nuanced case for how sabotaging fossil fuel infrastructure and machinery might be 'synergetic and complementary' to a movement largely centered around nonviolent mass mobilization". DeChristopher criticized the book for not explaining "how to avoid association with a rogue act of violence against humans if a sizable portion of the movement were to abandon the commitment to nonviolence", and praised Malm's "six-point analysis of why luxury emissions are the most strategic and symbolically important target", describing it as "so compelling that it’s hard to read this book without daydreaming about sabotaging the private jets of the ultra-rich". He wrote that "[one] of Malm's most important contributions in the book" is the final chapter in which Malm argues against the belief that it is too late for climate activism.

In an opinion article in The New York Times, columnist Ezra Klein wrote that "[a] truer title would be 'Why to Blow Up a Pipeline'", characterizing Malm's answer as "[because] nothing else has worked". Stating that Malm was "less convincing" about "whether blowing up pipelines would work here, and now", Klein argued that there would likely be political consequences to sabotage, including imprisonment of climate activists as well as political repression. In The New Republic, Benjamin Kunkel wrote that the book "does not explain how to blow up a pipeline so much as argue for why to do so", stating that Malm's argument "provokes a few natural objections" and concluding by agreeing with the author's position that individual political tactics should not be fetishized.

After being asked about the ethics of the eco-terrorism depicted in his novel The Ministry for the Future, author Kim Stanley Robinson told The World Today that he personally believed in nonviolence. He additionally suggested that How to Blow Up a Pipeline would be a better book for thinking about the issue, because it "makes a distinction that [The Ministry for the Future] is not good at, which is the distinction between sabotage and violence against property or destruction of property as against physical attacks on people".

=== Opposition ===
In response to Ezra Klein's mention of How to Blow Up a Pipeline in The New York Times, a Fox News article by Lindsay Kornick claimed that Klein "appeared to condone eco-terrorism", writing that "Klein appeared to understand and even sympathize with the author". After Malm was a guest on The New Yorker Radio Hour in September 2021 and spoke about central ideas from the book, another article in Fox News by the same author described him as a "climate change extremist who advocates for 'intelligent sabotage'". In The Spectator World, Grayson Quay argued the fact that the interview took place was hypocritical because an anti-abortion activist who had written a book titled "How to Blow Up an Abortion Clinic" would not have gotten the same opportunity, describing Malm as a "scofflaw".

In October 2021, the Fort Worth Intelligence Exchange (a fusion center in Texas) circulated a document about How to Blow Up a Pipeline nationwide. The document, which was later obtained by Property of the People, detailed concerns about the book and its content while stating that it was not connected to any known threat.

=== Other reactions ===
The environmental direct action group, Tyre Extinguishers, who began deflating tyres on SUVs in March 2022 as an act of climate protest, and are now active in 17 countries, say they were inspired to start their group by How to Blow Up a Pipeline. Malm called the group's actions a form of "extremely peaceful and gentle sabotage...anyone can deflate an SUV: it is virtually child's play. It requires no formal organization, no leadership, no funds, no implements other than bits of gravel or beans or green lentils. Given the infinitely replicable nature of the action—sabotage as meme—its potential for making SUV ownership less convenient and attractive could not be discounted."

== Film adaptation ==
The book was adapted into a thriller film, also titled How to Blow Up a Pipeline. The film was directed by Daniel Goldhaber, and written by Ariela Barer, Jordan Sjol, and Goldhaber. It revolves around a group of eight young people who decide to blow up an oil pipeline. It premiered in the Platform Prize program at the 2022 Toronto International Film Festival on September 10, 2022. After its premiere, Neon acquired the North American distribution rights and released it theatrically in the United States on April 7, 2023.
