= Wimbledon school crash =

Fatal collision in London

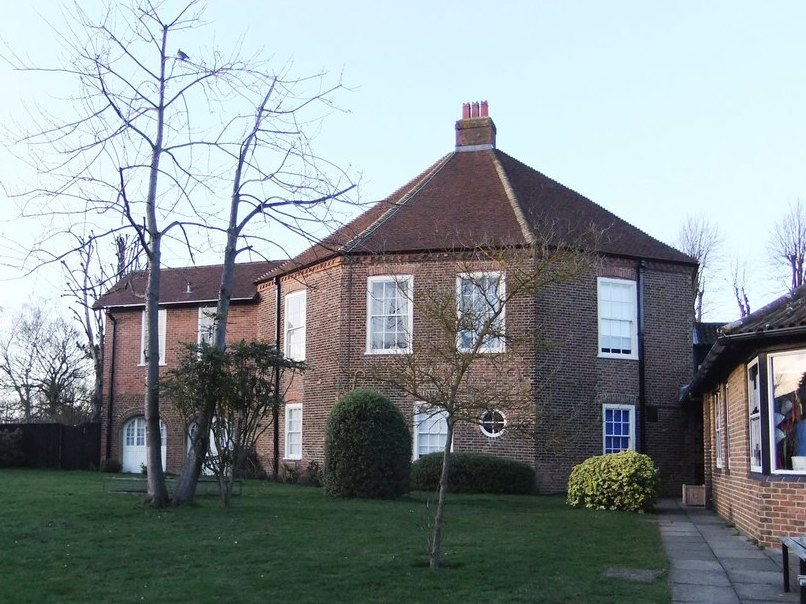
- The Study Preparatory School in February 2011
- Date: 6 July 2023
- Time: 09:54 (BST (UTC+1))
- Location: The Study Preparatory School Wimbledon, London; 51°25′34.38″N 0°13′54.3″W
- Type: Traffic collision
- Deaths: 2
- Injuries: 14

Shortly before 09:54 BST on 6 July 2023, a Land Rover Defender crashed into an end-of-year tea party, killing two girls and injuring several others, mainly children, at The Study, a girls' preparatory school in Wimbledon, south-west London, England. The driver of the car was arrested and bailed on suspicion of causing death by dangerous driving. The crash was widely reported on the front pages of national newspapers on the day after the crash, and inspired acts of vandalism against SUVs.

In June 2024, the chief crown prosecutor said no charges were brought because the driver had suffered an epileptic seizure, which they had not previously been diagnosed with. The case was re-opened in October 2024 after the two girls' families raised concerns about the investigation, and the driver was arrested again in January 2025. In May 2026, the driver was charged with two counts of causing death by dangerous driving and seven offences of causing serious injury by dangerous driving.

== Incident ==
At 09:54 BST on 6 July 2023, the London Ambulance Service received calls of a collision at an end-of-year tea party at The Study Preparatory School, a preparatory school for girls aged four to eleven in Wimbledon's Camp Road, at the edge of Wimbledon Common. A Land Rover had left the road and crashed through the school's wooden fence and into a building. It was the school's last day before the summer holidays.

The London Ambulance Service declared a major incident. Fifteen ambulances and thirty-five police vehicles were dispatched to the scene, as well as the London Air Ambulance. Sixteen patients were treated at the school and ten patients were taken to hospital. Those injured included pupils, parents and carers, but not school staff. Wimbledon and Putney Commons, who manage the Common, urged the public to stay away from the area to allow free access to the emergency services. The incident prompted "the largest local policing deployment in south-west London since 2017".

An eight-year-old girl died on the day of the crash. A second eight-year-old girl died on 9 July at St George's Hospital. By the end of July, all the children had returned home from hospital.

== Reactions ==
The crash prompted statements from politicians including Stephen Hammond, Wimbledon's MP, Sadiq Khan, the Mayor of London, Gillian Keegan, the Education Secretary, Suella Braverman, the Home Secretary, Yvette Cooper, the Shadow Home Secretary, and a spokesman for the Prime Minister. Merton Council offered counselling to affected pupils, staff, and families.

The incident was widely reported on the front pages of national newspapers the day following the crash. The crash took place during the first week of the 2023 Wimbledon Championships, hosted at the All England Lawn Tennis and Croquet Club 0.9 miles (1.4 kilometres) northeast of the school.

Norman Baker, the former Parliamentary Under-Secretary of State for Transport, commented after the crash that 4x4s are "completely inappropriate for urban locations".

A week following the crash, anti-SUV campaigners in Broughty Ferry, a suburb of Dundee, vandalised a Range Rover and left a warning letter with headshots of the deceased girls. In August 2023, the Tyre Extinguishers activist group described their puncturing of the tyres of more than 60 SUVs at a Land Rover dealership in Exeter as an "act of retaliation" to the incident in Wimbledon.

== Investigations ==
The crash was not considered to be terror-related. The driver was taken to hospital with a non-life threatening condition. The driver was later arrested and bailed on suspicion of causing death by dangerous driving.

On 12 July, inquests into the two girls' deaths were adjourned at Inner West London Coroner's Court. On 20 July the driver was rebailed until late September 2023, and was subsequently rebailed until January 2024.

In November 2023, Moore Barlow, a law firm supporting twenty families affected by the crash, publicly questioned the delay in the case. The parents of the second girl who died spoke to BBC London. On 31 December, in an interview article with The Times, the parents released a photo of the mother and daughter taken moments before the crash.

In February 2024, the driver was released pending investigation. The lawyer representing the families criticised the decision as providing "no time scale" to the investigation's conclusion, calling on a "new protocol… where investigations by the police should be carried out expeditiously". The parents of the first girl spoke to Vanessa Feltz on TalkTV, expressing their lack of confidence in the Metropolitan Police and criticising the delay in the investigation. They released a video of the girl playing The Entertainer on the piano at the school concert preceding the crash. The Met confirmed the delay was due to a lack of specialist investigators.

On 26 June 2024, the CPS announced the driver would not face charges because they had suffered an epileptic seizure whilst driving, a condition they had not been previously diagnosed with and which could not have been anticipated. Neurological specialists concluded that the event was the first such medical episode that the driver had experienced. The driver's solicitor responded to the CPS's announcement by stating that although his client was driving when the accident occurred, the driver was not in control of the vehicle and was not at fault for the incident.

In July 2024, the Metropolitan Police announced that they were reviewing their investigation. An internal review found that the initial investigation team within the Road Traffic Collisions Unit had failed to interview witnesses concerning the behaviour of the driver immediately after the crash.

In October 2024, after the two girls' families raised concerns about the investigation, the case was re-opened. On 28 January 2025 the driver was arrested on suspicion of causing death by dangerous driving.

On 14 April 2026, the BBC announced that eleven Metropolitan Police officers are being investigated by the Independent Office for Police Conduct for gross misconduct for their handling of the initial inquiry into the crash and that they are assessing whether they will bring charges against the driver involved.

On 1 May 2026, the driver involved in the crash was charged with two counts of causing death by dangerous driving and seven offences of causing serious injury by dangerous driving. The first court hearing took place on 16 June 2026, during which the driver was granted bail.

== See also ==
- Automatism (law)
