= How to Blow Up a Pipeline (film) =

2022 film directed by Daniel Goldhaber

- Theatrical release poster
- Directed by: Daniel Goldhaber
- Written by: Ariela Barer; Jordan Sjol; Daniel Goldhaber
- Based on: How to Blow Up a Pipeline by Andreas Malm
- Produced by: Isa Mazzei; Daniel Goldhaber; Ariela Barer; Adam Wyatt Tate; David Grove Churchill Viste; Alex Black; Alex Hughes
- Starring: Ariela Barer; Kristine Froseth; Lukas Gage; Forrest Goodluck; Sasha Lane; Jayme Lawson; Marcus Scribner; Jake Weary; Irene Bedard
- Cinematography: Tehillah De Castro
- Edited by: Daniel Garber
- Music by: Gavin Brivik
- Production companies: Chrono; Lyrical Media; Spacemaker Productions
- Distributed by: Neon
- Release dates: September 10, 2022 (TIFF); April 7, 2023 (United States)
- Running time: 104 minutes
- Country: United States
- Language: English
- Box office: $1 million

How to Blow Up a Pipeline is a 2022 American action-thriller film directed by Daniel Goldhaber, who co-wrote the screenplay with Ariela Barer and Jordan Sjol. It relies on ideas advanced in Andreas Malm's 2021 book of the same name, published by Verso Books. Malm's nonfiction work examines the history of social justice movements and argues for property destruction as a valid tactic in the pursuit of environmental justice. The film stars Barer, Kristine Froseth, Lukas Gage, Forrest Goodluck, Sasha Lane, Jayme Lawson, Marcus Scribner, Jake Weary, and Irene Bedard.

Set primarily in West Texas, the film follows a fictional group of eight young individuals who decide to blow up an oil pipeline at two key locations. It explores the moral validity of extreme actions in addressing the climate crisis, the question of terrorism, and the use of property damage and sabotage as activist tactics. The production of the film spanned 19 months, from conception to completion, with principal photography taking place in New Mexico. The film premiered on September 10, 2022, at the 2022 Toronto International Film Festival and was released in the United States on April 7, 2023.

Receiving generally favorable reviews from critics, How to Blow Up a Pipeline was praised for its eco-thriller premise, its exploration of moral and psychological challenges, and the complexity of its antiheroes. However, a number of critics expressed concerns regarding the perceived promotion of terrorism and violence in the film's narrative.

== Plot ==
A young woman, Xochitl, cuts the tires of an SUV and leaves a bright yellow one-page manifesto on the window.

In Long Beach, California, Xochitl and her friend Theo witness the devastating effects of climate change. Xochitl's mother dies during a heat wave in a city plagued by pollution from oil refineries. Frustrated by the slow progress of their campus divestment campaign, Xochitl expresses a desire for more radical environmental action. Theo is diagnosed with terminal cancer caused by the pollution, adding a sense of urgency to their cause.

Theo and Xochitl convince Theo's skeptical girlfriend, Alisha, and a number of other individuals, to plot an act of environmental terrorism. Shawn, a film student who met Xochitl through the divestment movement, introduces the group to Dwayne, a blue-collar Texan with deep resentment towards an oil company that used eminent domain laws to seize his family's ancestral land, depriving him and his pregnant wife of their home. The team also recruits Michael, a Native American self-taught explosives expert from a North Dakota reservation. Completing the group are Rowan and Logan, an adventurous young couple drawn to the cause.

United by their shared belief that non-disruptive action is insufficient, the group devises a plan to strategically detonate homemade explosives along an unguarded section of a recently constructed oil pipeline in West Texas. The pipeline is partially built on Dwayne's land; his intimate knowledge of the targeted area helps the group plan the attack. They hope that the destruction of the segment will force the company to shut down its Texas operations for a period of time, causing crude oil prices worldwide to spike due to their indexing to West Texas crude. The group gathers at a remote cabin, where they begin manufacturing explosives and digging up a section of the pipeline.

While executing their plan, the group encounters several setbacks and challenges. Members of the crew are distracted by alcohol, Michael accidentally detonates a primer charge during preparation, a surveillance drone monitors their activities, and Alisha fractures her leg when a barrel of explosives falls on her. Rowan and Logan, entrusted to prevent local pollution by shutting off the pipeline flow, find themselves unexpectedly confronted by armed company property inspectors. Logan successfully distracts them while Rowan completes the task. In the process, he sustains a gunshot wound. Despite these challenges, the group successfully blows up the pipeline. Xochitl broadcasts a triumphant message on Instagram calling others to action.

Following the explosion, the group scatters and Rowan tends to Logan's injuries, removing bullet fragments from his shoulder. She then discreetly meets with two FBI agents. Xochitl knowingly included Rowan, an FBI informant, in their plan, enabling them to outwit federal and local police by convincing them that only Theo and Xochitl were involved in the sabotage. Rowan secures her freedom (having previously faced legal consequences following her involvement in a similar incident) and receives a substantial reward for her information. Michael, Alisha, Shawn, and Dwayne quickly establish alibis placing them away from the scene. The police find the cabin where the group had manufactured the explosives just moments after Theo and Xochitl detonate a final bomb inside. The duo peacefully surrenders as planned.

Theo and Xochitl are sentenced to lengthy prison terms, though Theo dies shortly afterwards. While the other group members remain free, family members suspect their involvement, federal agents monitor their actions, and they reflect on their decisions. Finally, another act of sabotage is shown. Inspired by the West Texas group, a trio of masked individuals plant a bomb in a Miami yacht, leaving behind the same manifesto seen earlier.

== Cast ==
- Ariela Barer as Xochitl Fuentes
- Kristine Froseth as Rowan
- Lukas Gage as Logan
- Forrest Goodluck as Michael
- Sasha Lane as Theo
- Jayme Lawson as Alisha
- Marcus Scribner as Shawn
- Jake Weary as Dwayne
- Irene Bedard as Joanna

== Production ==
According to director and producer Daniel Goldhaber, the production of the film spanned 19 months, from conception to completion and premiere. Goldhaber worked alongside a team of seven credited producers. The accelerated timeline was motivated by the urgency of the political conversation surrounding climate change, with the need for immediate action being a key factor. The filmmakers aimed to contribute to the cultural dialogue and believed that a swift production would align with the film's themes and purpose. Additionally, industry timing considerations, such as the opportunity to showcase the film at the Toronto International Film Festival, influenced the decision to complete the project within a short timeframe. The film has been described as small-budget.

Published in January 2021, Andreas Malm's work of nonfiction, How to Blow Up a Pipeline, published by Verso Books, deeply influenced Goldhaber, who was grappling with a sense of creative and political helplessness. Joined by Jordan Sjol, Goldhaber partnered with Ariela Barer to co-write the screenplay following her abandonment of another project. The film wholeheartedly embraces the book's central argument, positing that the pressing climate crisis warrants sabotage as a legitimate means of self-defense against the activities of powerful energy entities. The trio completed the script within four months, after two months of research. The filmmakers conducted extensive interviews with climate activists and pipeline experts, incorporating their experiences into the creation of characters like Theo, who was influenced by a friend's leukemia diagnosis attributed to living near a chemical plant. They were also inspired by real-life cases, such as Jessica Reznicek and Ruby Montoya's imprisonment for vandalizing the Dakota Access Pipeline.

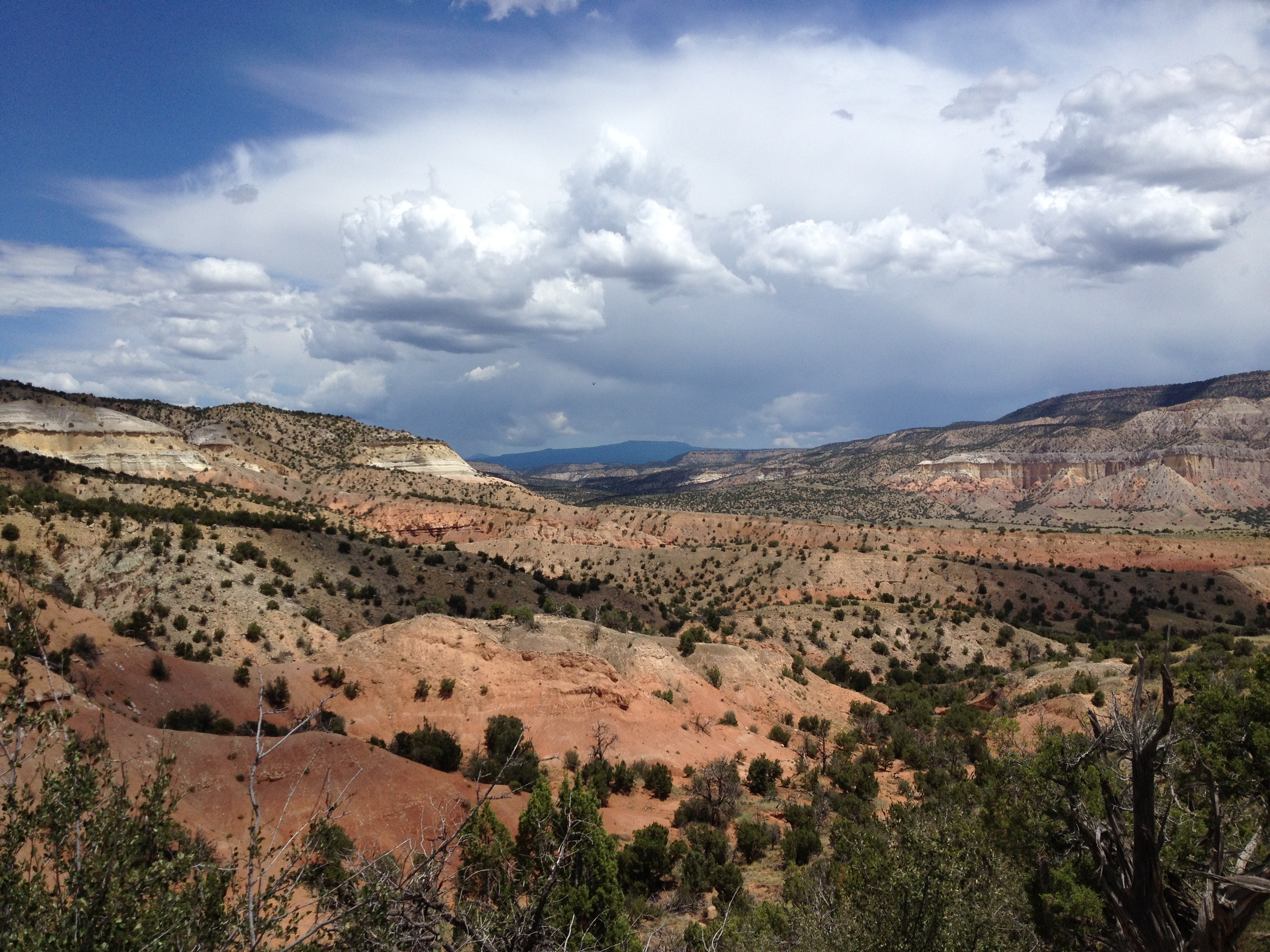
Principal photography took place in New Mexico.

Casting meetings commenced before the script was finalized. Despite initial challenges in securing financial backing, Goldhaber and Barer successfully obtained support from a financier acquainted with Goldhaber during the Cannes Film Festival. The film was produced and financed by Lyrical Media and Spacemaker Prods., in collaboration with the production company Chrono.

Filming spanned 22 days, primarily in New Mexico, with a key sequence filmed in North Dakota on the reservation where actor Forest Goodluck's family lived. Additional scenes were shot in California. The filmmakers opted for 16 mm film to capture the desired quality in daylight exterior scenes, and to give the footage a more cinematic feel. The shooting ratio averaged around 21 or 22 to one.

The team collaborated with a government contractor specializing in counterterrorism for realistic depictions of bomb-making scenes, while certain steps were omitted for dramatic purposes. The film's explosion sequence combined practical effects with CGI augmentation. A 150-foot mock-up structure made of industrial cardboard and wood was detonated to create the desired explosive and fire effects. Post-production involved six months of editing.

Composer Gavin Brivik flew to the film set to capture music samples, including banging on oil drums in the desert. These sounds became the foundation for the film's opening track. Brivik drew inspiration from early Michael Mann films and musique concrète. The score blends raw oil drum recordings with distorted synths, mirroring the gritty cinematography. Brivik considers the film's score to be one of the most challenging he has ever written.

== Release ==
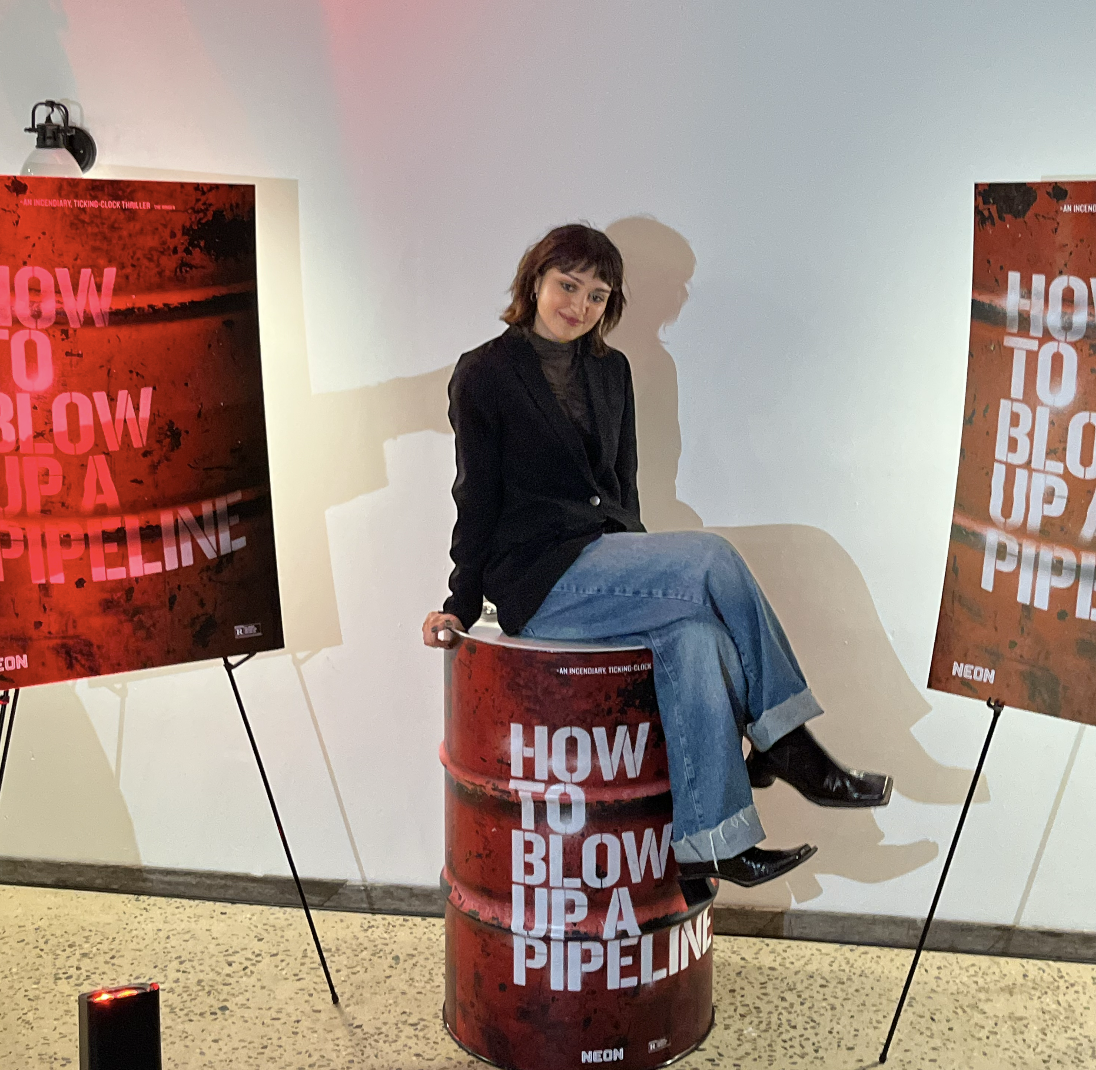
Ariela Barer attends a 2023 screening of the film in Brooklyn, New York.

The film had its world premiere on September 10, 2022, at the 2022 Toronto International Film Festival, where it was showcased in the Platform Prize program and received critical acclaim. Shortly after the premiere, Neon acquired the distribution rights for North America, with plans for a theatrical release, through negotiations facilitated by CAA Media Finance. Leading up to its debut at the American Film Market in November 2022, Charades, a French distributor, finalized several distribution agreements for the film. The company then successfully sold the rights to multiple territories, including France (Tandem), the United Kingdom (Vertigo Releasing), German-speaking Switzerland, Austria, Italy, and Germany (Plaion), Benelux (The Searchers), Turkey (Fabula), and Latin America (Impacto). The film made its release in the United States on April 7, 2023, and in the United Kingdom and Ireland on April 21.

=== Box office ===
How to Blow Up a Pipeline grossed $750,010 in the United States with an additional $296,801 in other territories for a total of $1,046,811 worldwide.

During its domestic theatrical run, How to Blow Up a Pipeline was shown in theaters for 107 days, equivalent to 15 weeks. At its peak, the film was screened in 530 theaters during the week of April 21, 2023. In its opening week, the film made $153,475 across 12 theaters, achieving a per-theater average of $12,789. During its widest release, the per-theater average dropped to $482.

Internationally, the film grossed $23,955 in Norway, where it reached its peak presence in 52 theaters and ran for 8 weeks. In Turkey, it earned $1,863, with a peak presence in 3 theaters and a run time of 3 weeks. In the United Kingdom, the film grossed $106,520, with a peak presence in 144 theaters and a run time of 13 weeks.

== Reception ==
=== Critical response ===
On the review aggregator website Rotten Tomatoes, the film has an approval rating of 94% based on 159 critic reviews, with an average rating of 7.8/10. The site's critics consensus reads, "An explosive adaptation of Andreas Malm's treatise, How to Blow Up a Pipeline delivers a high-stakes eco-thriller ignited by riveting and complex antiheroes." Metacritic assigned the film a score of 76 out of 100 based on 29 reviews indicating "generally favorable" reviews.

TheWrap lauded Goldhaber's directorial approach, likening it to Steven Soderbergh's style, and praised the ensemble cast and the film's ability to ignite a sense of urgency in activism. Vulture characterized the film as unapologetically confrontational, wearing its intentions boldly and employing an authentic approach, while Variety commended the film but acknowledged that it may face criticism from climate change deniers.

In a review for The New York Times, Peter C. Baker called the film a "cultural landmark" for its uniquely sympathetic portrayal of eco-terrorism. In another review for the newspaper, Ben Kenigsberg wrote that the film had "a degree of suspense and efficiency that are becoming all too rare in the mainstream." However, he criticized it for packaging itself as having a deeper message while avoiding grappling with the characters' ideologies. He also questioned the placement of flashbacks, which he noted seem to serve primarily as plot twists.

In his review for RogerEbert.com, Matt Zoller Seitz gave the film 3.5 out of 4 stars, praising it as "one of the most original American thrillers in years." Seitz commended the film for its thought-provoking nature and its exploration of the moral and psychological challenges faced by individuals involved in underground activist movements. He highlighted the film's ability to connect various systemic problems and lauded its approach to shedding light on these issues. He also commended the performances of the cast, particularly Jayme Lawson and Forrest Goodluck. In another review for RogerEbert.com, film critic Brian Tallerico praised How to Blow Up a Pipeline as a unique and intense film that breaks away from the polished mainstream. He highlighted the personal passion of director Daniel Goldhaber, and noted that the film effectively transforms the concept of climate change into a thrilling heist narrative, which he believed would resonate with younger viewers.

The Washington City Paper noted that the film is not an instruction manual but "a way to illuminate genuine moral objections", and described its cast as "a much more intense, combustible version of The Breakfast Club." A pair of reviews by Wendy Ide in The Observer and Peter Bradshaw in The Guardian each gave the film four out of five stars; Ide wrote that the film functions as both a "nervy thriller" and "a lightning rod for the mounting anger of climate-conscious audiences", while Bradshaw praised it as a "fiercely watchable thriller" and drew comparisons with Quentin Tarantino's Reservoir Dogs. He also noted the film's departure from traditional heist films, where the pipeline destroyers are portrayed as the "good guys", which he found to be an intriguing genre twist. Clarisse Loughrey of The Independent gave the film 4 out of 5 stars and called it a "radical Marxist thriller that speaks to a generation’s anger."

Some writers and critics, including Jesse Kline of the right wing newspaper The National Post, offered less favorable reviews of the film and its underlying message. Kline specifically criticized the film's perceived attempt to normalize terrorism. He questioned the positive reception given by critics and raised the potential controversy if a similar approach were applied to justifying the actions of Islamist terrorists in a film titled "How to Fly Planes Into a Building." While acknowledging the film's entertainment value in terms of its plot and tension, Kline critiqued its heavy emphasis on what he calls "environmental propaganda" and its promotion of a morally objectionable message that supports vigilante violence and the destruction of private property in the name of the collective good. In his review for National Review, Armond White also criticized the film for promoting violence and terrorism under the guise of "diversity of tactics," viewing it as a cold-blooded portrayal rather than a cautionary tale. White argued that the generally positive reception to the film reflected a self-hatred within Western media.

Author Andreas Malm, whose book inspired the film, stated that the film would be able to reach a broader audience than his work, and hoped it would begin a conversation, rather than directly inspiring imitations of the film's plot.

=== Concerns raised by authorities ===
The film raised concerns among federal and provincial agencies in North America, fearing it may inspire climate activists to resort to sabotage. A "Take Action" section on the film's official website includes a detailed map of pipeline locations in the United States and Canada. Upon the film's release in the United States, 23 federal and state entities issued a total of 35 warnings. FBI documents obtained by Rolling Stone revealed concerns about the potential for the film to inspire terrorist attacks on energy targets. The alerts mentioned the possibility of attacks or disruptions on critical infrastructure, leading to increased security measures. Law enforcement agencies were advised to monitor individuals attempting to access facilities for photography or video recording. The Alberta Energy Regulator warned that the film should not be taken lightly, urging increased surveillance and security measures by pipeline operators and licensees. The RCMP acknowledged the film's concerning subject in an email with The Globe and Mail, but noted that they determined enforcement actions based on evidence and intelligence.

=== Themes ===
The film supports the book's argument that the climate threat justifies sabotage as self-defense against powerful energy interests. Through the protagonists' perspective, the film raises questions about the validity of extreme actions in addressing the urgent climate crisis, as well as the label of terrorism. The film also explores the theme of property damage and sabotage as legitimate activist tactics, particularly in the context of climate change and the destruction of fossil fuel infrastructure. The film challenges the narrative of individual responsibility for climate change and instead focuses on the systemic nature of the issue.

The film's setting in West Texas serves as a symbolic reference to Westerns and their depiction of wide-open Americana. By incorporating Western tropes and themes, such as heists and the concept of outsiders reclaiming agency, the movie connects itself to a narrative of resistance in American culture. The film also seeks to represent diverse voices and communities affected by the climate change crisis, highlighting the need for broad access points and different tactics in addressing the issue. It also touches on topics such as the health consequences of living in a toxic environment, property rights violations, indigenous land rights, and the impact of disruptive actions on ordinary citizens.

Peter C. Baker of The New York Times highlighted the film's examination of uncertainty and the question of how future generations will judge present actions. He noted the sympathetic treatment of the protagonists and the deliberate creation of a historical feel. Baker underscored the film's emphasis on the moral stakes of decision-making and the unpredictable nature of the future.

== See also ==
- List of environmental films
- Eco-terrorism in fiction
- Climate fiction
