= 2024 Academy Awards =

2024 Academy Awards may refer to:

- 96th Academy Awards, the Academy Awards ceremony that took place in 2024, honoring the best in film for 2023
- 97th Academy Awards, the Academy Awards ceremony that took place in 2025, honoring the best in film for 2024
