= Powerless (novel) =

Novel by Lauren Roberts

- Author: Lauren Roberts
- Publisher: Simon & Schuster
- Publication date: November 7, 2023
- ISBN: 979-8-987-38040-6

Powerless is a 2023 young adult romantic fantasy novel written by American author Lauren Roberts. Roberts originally self-published the book to Barnes & Noble Press and Amazon's Kindle Direct Publishing services.

Powerless is the first book in a five-part series: Powerless (2023), Powerful (2024), Reckless (2024), Fearless (2025), and Fearful (2025). Powerful and Fearful are novellas written from different points of view than the trilogy but take place at the same time as Powerless (for Powerful) and Fearless (for Fearful).

== Plot ==
This novel follows an 18 year old girl called Paedyn Gray, who is an Ordinary, a person without powers. The book also follows Kai Azer, the youngest of two princes of Ilya, who is a Wielder, an Elite who can sense and then use other Elites' powers. In the Kingdom of Ilya, where Paedyn and Kai live, society is split into two categories, Elites and Ordinaries. The Elites are powerful, while the Ordinaries are hunted and killed or banished from the kingdom, because many Elites believe them to carry an undetectable sickness that dwindles the Elites’ powers over time.

The King of Ilya believes the Ordinaries are abnormal and would ruin the kingdom's reputation. Every year, the kingdom holds a series of competitions called 'The Purging Trials'. In these 'Trials', nine chosen Elites battle each other to see who is the strongest and would come out on top. Paedyn saves the prince Kai’s life and becomes known as 'the Silver Savior' due to her silver hair. Because of this, she is chosen to compete in the Trials. Paedyn has to survive the Trials whilst also posing as an Elite Psychic.

== Background ==
Roberts began writing Powerless at age 18 and shared story updates with social media followers to request feedback on tropes.

Roberts originally self-published the book. It was then published by Simon & Schuster in 2023.

== Reception ==
=== Reviews ===
Reviewers critiqued Roberts's handling of difficult topics amidst a fantasy romance novel. Publishers Weekly discussed how "Roberts unevenly touches on themes of privilege and inequality via sometimes overly descriptive prose", as well as how "steamy romantic encounters" are juxtaposed against "heart-pounding action and gory violence". Despite Roberts's attempt to address common tropes, Kirkus Reviews found that novel to be "a lackluster and sometimes disturbing mishmash of overused tropes". They specifically compared Powerless to The Hunger Games, noting that Roberts's story isn't "bolstered by the original’s heart or worldbuilding logic". They also discussed "illogical leaps", "inconsistent characterizations", and "ableist language", which serve as a backdrop to "lighthearted romantic interludes".

=== Awards and honors ===
In 2023, Powerless won the Barnes and Noble YA Award, and was nominated for the Goodreads Choice Award for Readers' Favorite Young Adult Fantasy & Science Fiction.

Powerless was also a New York Times bestseller for 19 weeks. It topped the Australia top 10 YA, (young adult fiction), bestseller chart for several weeks. It was the highest selling children's title in the Australia book market for one week.

== Adaptations ==
=== Television ===
A television series adaptation of the Powerless series is in the works by Amazon and Lyrical Media.

=== Audiobook ===
The Powerless audiobook was released on 20 July 2023. It is narrated by Chase Brown and Cecily Bednar Schmidt. In total, it is about 17 hours and 45 minutes long.
