= Marcus Scribner =

American actor (born 2000)

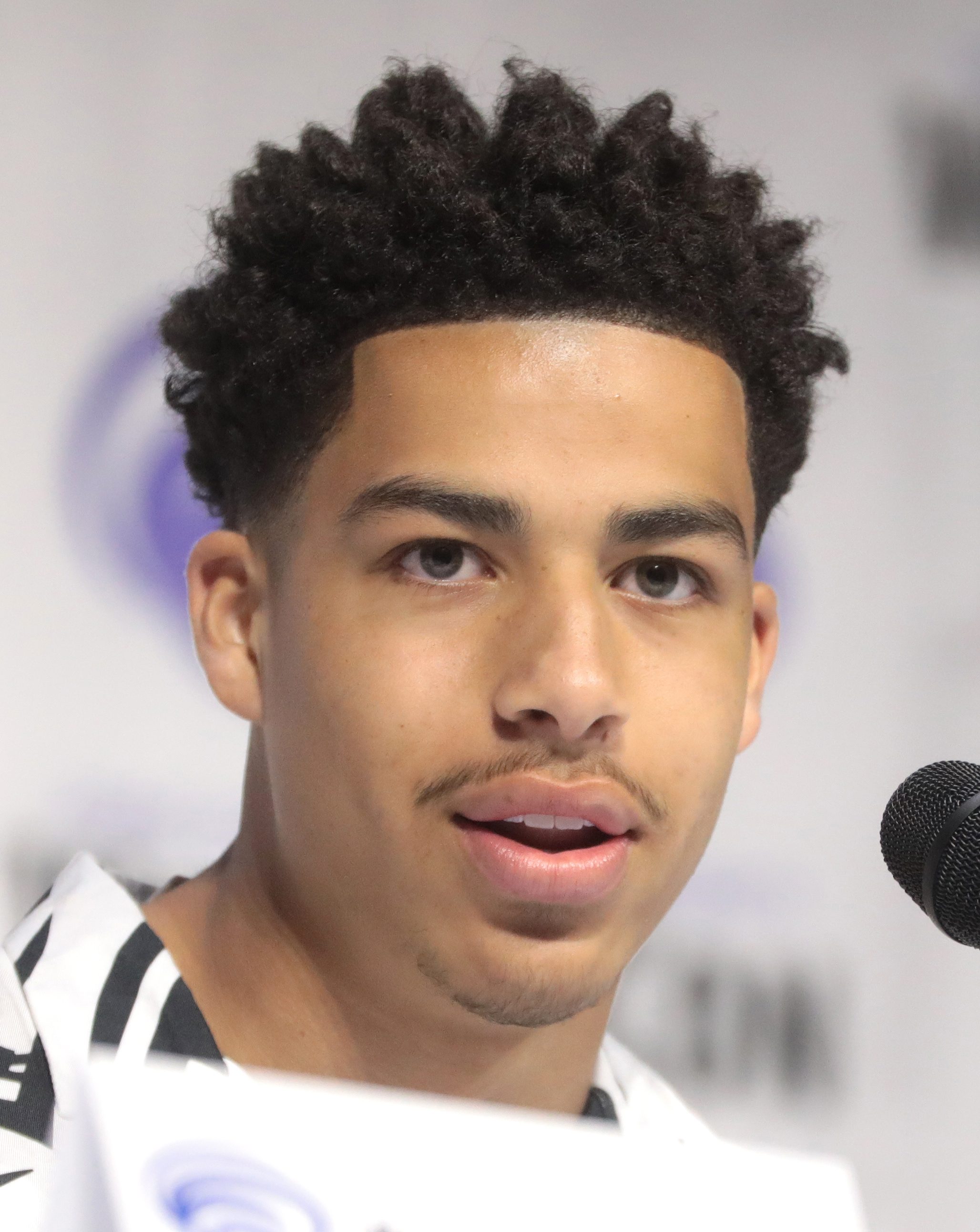
- Scribner at the 2019 WonderCon
- Born: January 7, 2000 (age 26); Los Angeles, California, U.S.
- Occupations: Actor, voice actor
- Years active: 2010–present
- Notable work: Black-ish; Grown-ish; Boston Blue

Marcus Scribner (born January 7, 2000) is an American actor. He is best known for starring as Andre "Junior" Johnson Jr. in all eight seasons of the ABC sitcom Black-ish, before starring as Junior in its spin-off Grown-ish from the fifth season onward (also serving as the series' narrator, after guest starring in the second to fourth seasons and Mixed-ish), as well as voicing the characters Bow in the Netflix animated series She-Ra and the Princesses of Power and D’Angelo Baker in DreamWorks Dragons: The Nine Realms.

In 2023, after starring in films for various streaming services, including YouTube Red, MUBI, Shudder, and Netflix, Scribner played a supporting role in his first live action film to have a wide release in theaters called How to Blow Up a Pipeline. In 2025, he began a main role as Boston Police officer Jonah Silver on the CBS crime drama Boston Blue.

== Early life and education ==
Scribner was born and raised in Los Angeles. His name is derived from Roman and Greek mythology, like those of his father Troy and sister Athena. Scribner also has a dog named Zeus whom he adopted as a puppy to commemorate his first professional acting job. Similar to his character on Black-ish, his father is Black while his mother is biracial (African American and white). His father's family is from Los Angeles while his maternal grandmother is from England. He began studying acting at age seven. At the time he was very shy and did not have any hobbies. In addition to sports, Scribner took an acting class and immediately fell in love with it. From that point, Scribner took acting classes on the weekends. Scribner later admitted that at the time, he was afraid of getting injured. Despite that, he enjoys sports such as basketball and lacrosse and also loves video games. When he was in kindergarten, Scribner hit his head on concrete while playing basketball and had to get five staples. Scribner started playing the clarinet in fifth grade. Though Scribner started at public high school in 2014, by early 2015, he was enrolled in home school to accommodate his work schedule.

== Career ==
When he was 10 years old, Scribner booked his first guest-star role on the ABC crime dramedy Castle. Scribner would go on to appear in an episodes of Fox's New Girl, TBS' Wedding Band and Nickelodeon's Wendell & Vinnie. At the age of 14, Scribner booked his first major role when he was cast in the role Andre Johnson Jr. in the ABC sitcom Black-ish opposite Anthony Anderson, Tracee Ellis Ross, Laurence Fishburne and Jenifer Lewis. Scribner actually beat out Anderson's own son Nathan for the role. In an interview with Teen Vogue, the actor explained that he heavily identified with the show. Scribner was 13 when he first auditioned for the series and 14 years old when the pilot was filmed. Scribner received an NAACP Image Award nomination for Outstanding Supporting Actor in a Comedy for his portrayal of Junior in the first season. In 2015, Scribner voiced Buck in Pixar's animated film The Good Dinosaur. In 2016, Scribner began voicing the recurring role of Smudge as a guest star on the Netflix animated series Home: Adventures with Tip & Oh. Later that summer Scribner started production on the Independent comedy Alexander IRL opposite Nathan Kress. With the launch of the Freeform spin-off Grown-ish, Scribner takes on a more prominent role during the fourth season of Black-ish. In 2018, it was announced that Scribner would star in thriller "Confessional."

Scribner voiced Bow in the animated Netflix series, She-Ra and the Princesses of Power. As his name suggests, Bow is a skilled archer. Bow is also the best friend of Glimmer and She-Ra.

In March 2022, it was announced that Scribner would be continuing as Andre Johnson Jr. by shifting over to Grown-ish for its fifth season, following the end of Black-ish's eight season run, replacing Yara Shahidi as the lead character and narrator of the series.

== Filmography ==
=== Film ===
Year	Title	Role	Notes
2015	The Good Dinosaur	Buck (voice)	
2017	Alexander IRL	Darius	
2020	Confessional	Garrett	Shudder original
2020	The F**k-It List	Clint	
2020	Farewell Amor	DJ	
2021	Ron's Gone Wrong	Alex (voice)	
2022	Along for the Ride	Wallace	
2022	How to Blow Up a Pipeline	Shawn	
2023	How I Learned to Fly	Daniel Davis	Lead role
2025	Food for the Soul	Trey	Short film
2026	Pizza Movie	Logan	

=== Television ===
Year	Title	Role	Notes
2010	Castle	Tim Thornton	Episode: "Den of Thieves"
2012	New Girl	Toby	Episode: "Control"
2012	Wedding Band	Ben	Episode: "Get Down on It"
2013	Wendell & Vinnie	Graham	Episode: "Valentines & the Cultural Experience"
2014–2022	Black-ish	Andre Johnson Jr.	Main role
2016	American Dad!	Movie Goer (voice)	Episode: "Garfield and Friends"
2016–2017	Home: Adventures with Tip & Oh	Smudge (voice)	7 episodes
2018–2020	She-Ra and the Princesses of Power	Bow (voice)	Main cast
2019	Mixed-ish	Andre "Junior" Johnson Jr.	Episode: "Becoming Bow"
2019–2021	Grown-ish	Andre "Junior" Johnson Jr.	Guest (4 episodes)
2022–2024	Grown-ish	Andre "Junior" Johnson Jr.	Lead role; narrator (season 5 & season 6)
2021–2023	Dragons: The Nine Realms	D'Angelo Baker (voice)	Main cast
2023–2024	Star Wars: Young Jedi Adventures	Bell Zettifar (voice)	4 episodes
2025-	Boston Blue	Jonah Silver	Series regular

== Awards and nominations ==
Year	Association	Category	Nominated work	Result
2015	NAACP Image Awards	NAACP Image Award for Outstanding Supporting Actor in a Comedy Series	Black-ish	Nominated
2016	NAACP Image Awards	NAACP Image Award for Outstanding Performance by a Youth	Black-ish	Won
2016	Young Artist Awards	Outstanding Young Ensemble Cast in a TV Series	Black-ish	Nominated
2017	Young Artist Awards	Best Performance in a TV Series – Leading Teen Actor	Black-ish	Nominated
2019	NAACP Image Awards	NAACP Image Award for Outstanding Supporting Actor in a Comedy Series	Black-ish	Won
