= Jayme Lawson =

American actress (born 1997)

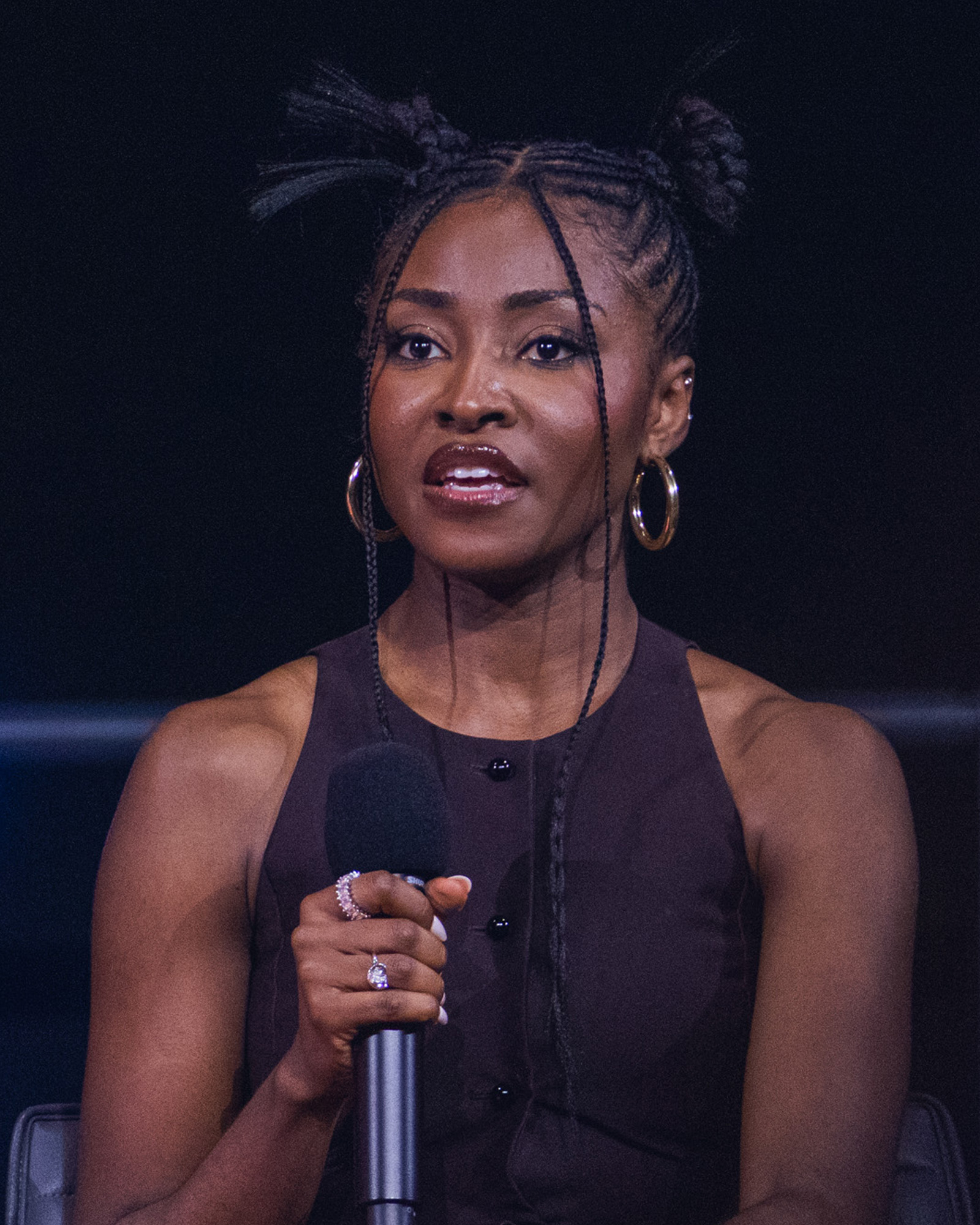
- Lawson in 2025
- Born: September 19, 1997 (age 29)
- Education: Juilliard School (BFA)
- Occupation: Actress
- Years active: 2019–present

Jayme Lawson (born September 19, 1997) is an American actress. She is best known for her roles as Mayor Bella Reál in The Batman (2022) and Pearline in Sinners (2025).

== Early life ==
Lawson grew up in the Washington, D.C. Metro Area as the youngest of six siblings. She attended Duke Ellington School of the Arts and spent summers attending theatre camp. Upon graduation, Lawson moved to New York City to attend Juilliard School. Lawson has cited her love of poetry and literature of the Harlem Renaissance as an early influence, as well as the talent of actresses Phylicia Rashad and Lucille Ball.

== Career ==
After graduating Juilliard in May 2019, Lawson appeared in the off-Broadway play For Colored Girls Who Have Considered Suicide / When the Rainbow Is Enuf, a revival of the 1976 hit play by Ntozake Shange. Lawson's performance was considered a stand out. Lawson's film debut was in the 2020 film Farewell Amor as Sylvia. In 2019, she gained attention when she was cast in the film The Batman (2022) as Bella Reál, a mayoral candidate for Gotham City. She would reprise her The Batman role in the 2024 HBO television series The Penguin.

In January 2021, she was cast as a young Michelle Obama in the television series The First Lady (2022). In 2022, she appeared in the drama films Till, How to Blow Up a Pipeline, and The Woman King as Myrlie Evers, Alisha, and Shante, respectively.

In 2025, Lawson co-starred in Ryan Coogler's supernatural period horror film Sinners; her performance earned Lawson a Gotham Independent Film Awards Ensemble Tribute Award. She also appears as Sheila in Edgar Wright’s The Running Man, an adaptation of the 1982 novel by Stephen King.

== Filmography ==
=== Film ===
Key
†	Denotes films that have not yet been released

Year	Title	Role	Notes
2020	Farewell Amor	Sylvia	
2022	The Batman	Bella Reál	
2022	How to Blow Up a Pipeline	Alisha	
2022	The Woman King	Shante	
2022	Till	Myrlie Evers	
2025	Sinners	Pearline	
2025	The Running Man	Sheila Richards	
2028	The Batman: Part II †	Bella Reál	Filming

=== Television ===
Year	Title	Role	Notes
2022	The First Lady	Young Michelle Obama	Recurring role, 7 episodes
2024	Genius	Betty Shabazz	Main role, 8 episodes (Season 4)
2024	The Penguin	Bella Reál	Miniseries, 2 episodes

== Stage credits ==
Year	Title	Role	Venue	Ref.
2019	For Colored Girls Who Have Considered Suicide / When the Rainbow Is Enuf	Lady in Green	The Public Theater	

== Awards and nominations ==
Award	Year	Category	Nominated work	Result	Ref.
Actor Awards	2026	Outstanding Performance by a Cast in a Motion Picture	Sinners	Won	
