= Code Rood =

Climate activist network in the Netherlands

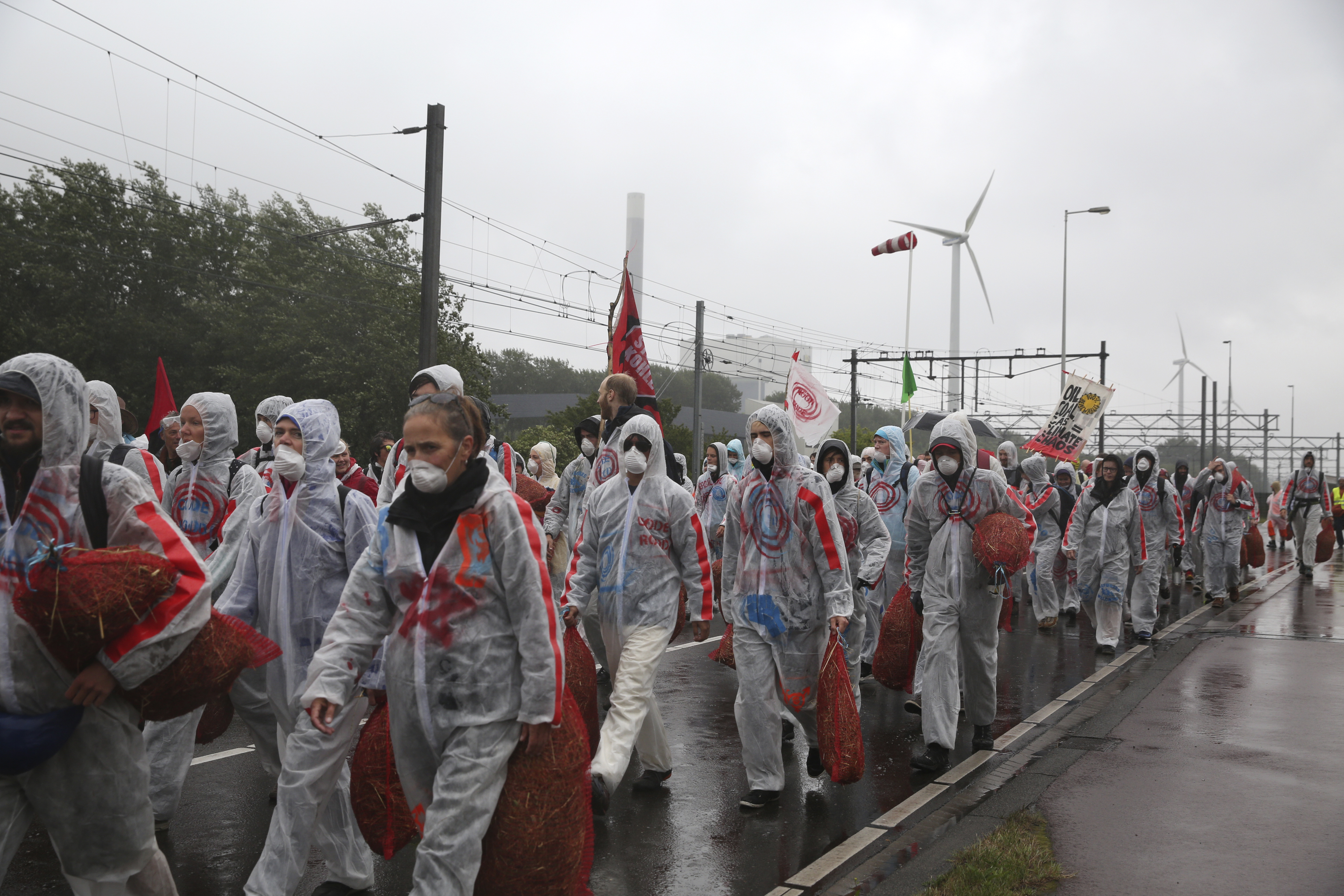
- Activists walking to a Code Rood civil disobedience action at the coal terminal of the Port of Amsterdam in 2017
- Purpose: Civil disobedience, climate activism
- Location: Netherlands

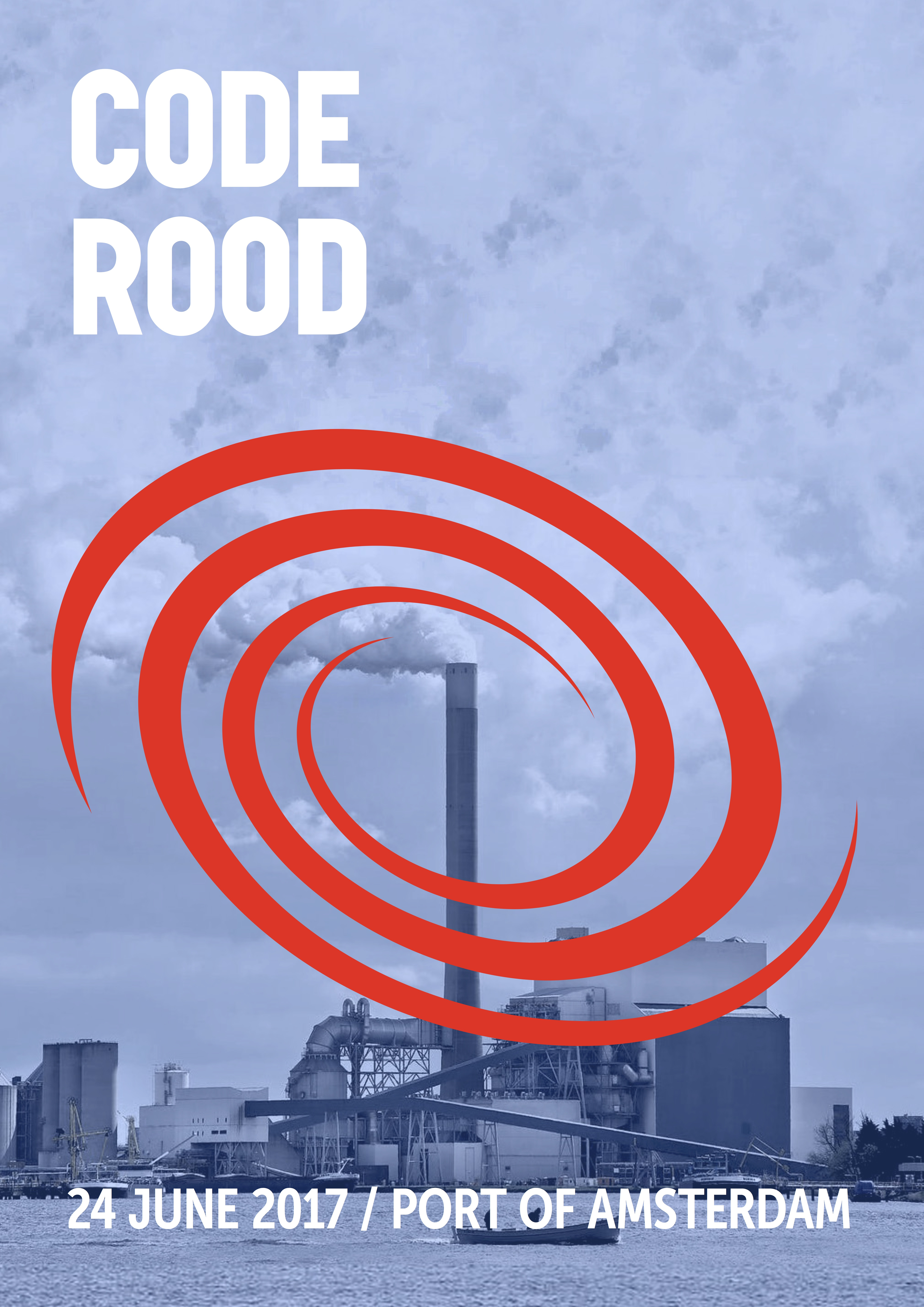
A flyer for a Code Rood action, including their red spiral logo

Code Rood (also styled CODE ROOD, Dutch for "Code Red") is a network of climate activists based in the Netherlands. The activists organize large-scale civil disobedience actions in opposition to the fossil fuel industry.

Code Rood is horizontally organized, and was inspired in part by Ende Gelände 2016, during which protestors shut down a coal mine and a coal-fired power station for a period of two days.

== History ==
In June 2017, Code Rood called for a civil disobedience action at the Port of Amsterdam as well as a climate camp nearby. The civil disobedience action took place on June 24, the second anniversary of the court case State of the Netherlands v. Urgenda Foundation. A group of about 300 activists successfully shut down the OBA Bulk Terminal Amsterdam coal port for over eight hours, which the company's executive director said cost them about 50,000 euros. The group had stated that they would leave before dark, but five activists remained in a crane and were arrested for trespassing.

In August 2018, Code Rood organized a protest in Groningen near a group of storage tanks belonging to Nederlandse Aardolie Maatschappij (NAM), a joint venture which is owned by Shell and ExxonMobil. The march was set up by locals whose homes had been damaged by NAM's natural gas extraction in the area, and approximately 400 to 700 people attended, setting up a camp which blocked transportation in and out of the tank complex. After 200 to 300 more protestors joined the group in the late afternoon, police used batons and pepper spray against a group that moved closer to the fence than agreed upon, and Code Rood reported that five activists were injured and one had to be treated in an ambulance. In February 2019, the police issued a statement that officers had used disproportionate force at the protest.

In May 2021, Code Rood collaborated with Extinction Rebellion to paint a Shell gas station in The Hague black as a protest while the gas company was holding its annual meeting in the same city.

== See also ==
- Geef Tegengas
- Ende Gelände
- Extinction Rebellion
- Climate change
