= Andreas Malm =

Swedish author and human ecologist

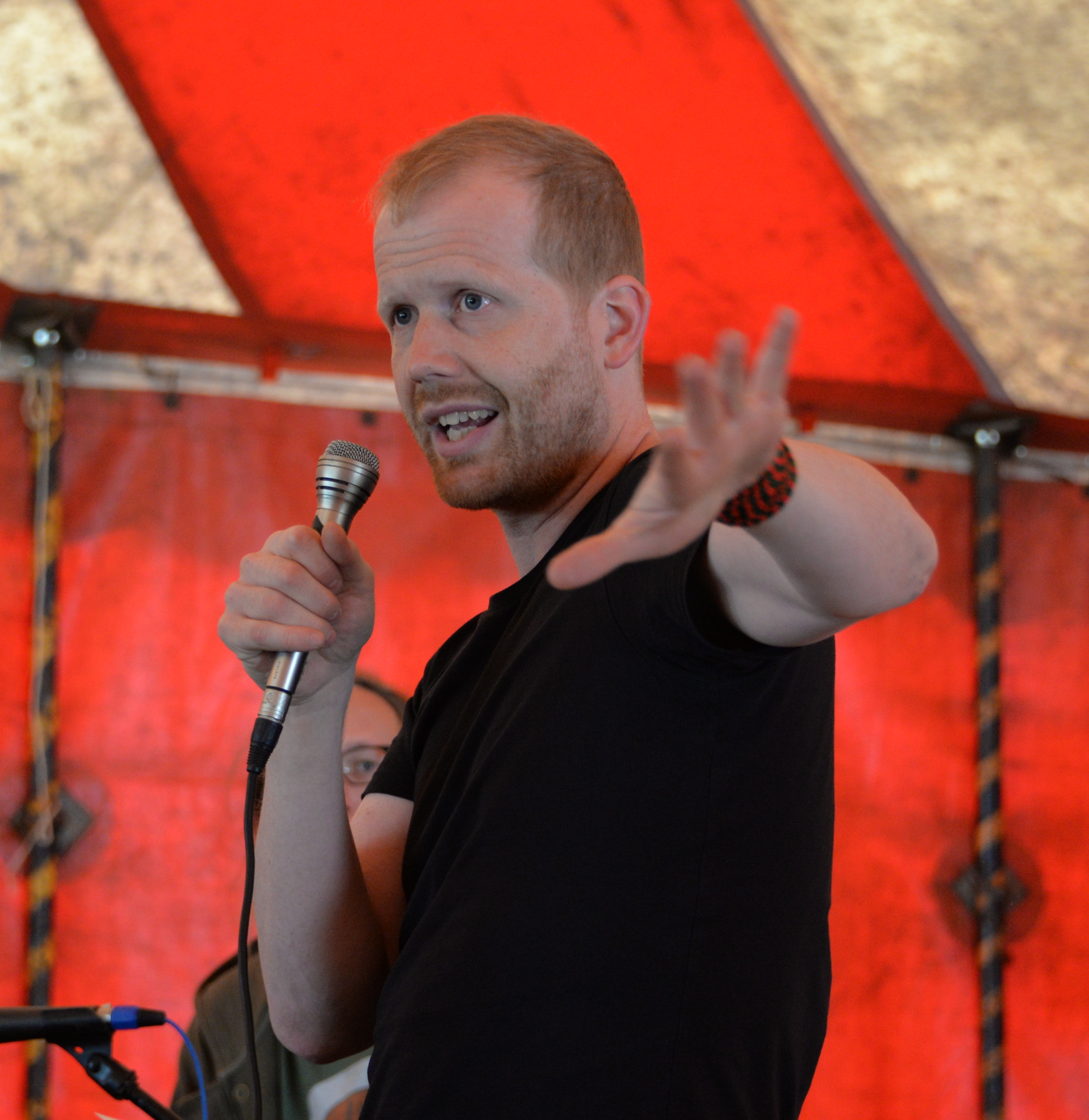
- Malm giving a lecture at Code Rood Action Camp 2018 in Groningen
- Born: 1977 (age 48–49); Mölndal, Sweden
- Occupations: Author, human ecologist

Academic background
- Education: Lund University
- Thesis: Fossil Capital: The Rise of Steam-Power in the British Cotton Industry, c. 1825–1848, and the Roots of Global Warming (2014)
- Doctoral advisor: Alf Hornborg

Academic work
- School or tradition: Marxism
- Institutions: Lund University
- Main interests: Climate change

Andreas Malm (born 1977) is a Swedish journalist and academic. He is a senior lecturer in human ecology and associate professor of human geography at Lund University. He is a member of the editorial board of the scholarly journal Historical Materialism and has described himself as a Marxist.

Psychoanalytic understanding of the climate crisis

On the far right, you see this aggressive defense of cars and fossil fuels that verges on a desire for destruction, ... Denial is as central to the development of the climate crisis as the greenhouse effect.

— Andreas Malm in January, 2024

Naomi Klein quoted Malm in her book This Changes Everything and has called him "one of the most original thinkers on the subject [of the climate crisis]."

== Life ==
Malm initially worked as a journalist. As part of his association with the Central Organisation of Swedish Workers (SAC), he was active in the Swedish Anarcho-Syndicalist Youth Federation (SUF) around 2000 and wrote for the press organ of SAC, Arbetaren, for a number of years. Having attended a summer camp of the Swedish Socialist Party in 1997, he joined it in 2010.

In 2014, Malm obtained a PhD in social and economic geography from Lund University with a thesis called Fossil Capital: The Rise of Steam-Power in the British Cotton Industry, c. 1825–1848, and the Roots of Global Warming, supervised by Alf Hornborg and examined by Timothy Mitchell. He released a reworked version of his thesis as Fossil Capital, published by Verso Books, which won the Deutscher Memorial Prize in 2016.

Malm has authored several books and is a contributor to the magazine Jacobin. In his book How to Blow Up a Pipeline: Learning to Fight in a World on Fire, published in 2021, he argues that sabotage and property damage are logical components of the movement against human-caused climate change. In The Guardian, geographer Brett Christophers wrote that Malm's research suggests that manufacturers during the Industrial Revolution switched from water power to steam not because steam was cheaper but because it was more profitable. The book was adapted into the 2022 narrative film How to Blow Up a Pipeline.

In 2025, Malm was awarded Jan Myrdal's big prize – The Lenin Award.

Malm has expressed support for the Palestinian right to armed resistance. Malm was intending to attend an academic conference, and to speak at a November 2026 Tribune conference in the UK titled "Washington's global reign of terror and Britain's role in reinforcing it" alongside Huda Ammori, one of the founders of Palestine Action, a group officially designated as a terrorist organisation by the UK government in 2025. In late October, his electronic travel authorisation was cancelled and he was informed by the Home Office that he could not travel to the UK because his presence would not be "conducive to the public good". Over 1,400 academics, from over 250 institutions, signed an open letter calling on the UK government to overturn the decision, stating that it was "a grave violation of academic freedom and freedom of expression".

== Books ==
- Bulldozers mot ett folk: Om ockupationen av Palestina och det svenska sveket. Stockholm: Agora. 2002. ISBN 9789189483170.
- Iran on the Brink: Rising workers and threats of war. Written with Shora Esmailian. London: Pluto Press. 2007. ISBN 9781849643436.
- Hatet mot muslimer. Stockholm: Atlas. 2009. ISBN 978-91-7389-349-7.
- Fossil Capital: The rise of steam power and the roots of global warming. London: Verso Books. 2016. ISBN 978-1-78478-129-3.
- The Progress of this Storm: Nature and society in a warming world. London: Verso Books. 2018. ISBN 978-1-78663-415-3.
- Corona, Climate, Chronic Emergency: War communism in the twenty-first century. Verso Books. 2020. ISBN 978-1-83976-215-4.
- How to Blow Up a Pipeline: Learning to fight in a world on fire. London: Verso Books. 2021. ISBN 978-1-83976-025-9.
- White Skin, Black Fuel: On the danger of fossil fascism. London: Verso Books. 2021. ISBN 978-1-83976-174-4.
- Overshoot: How the world surrendered to climate breakdown. Written with Wim Carton. London: Verso Books. 2024. ISBN 9781804293980.
- The Destruction of Palestine is the Destruction of the Earth. London: Verso Books. 2025. ISBN 9781836740070.
- The Long Heat: Climate politics when it's too late. Written with Wim Carton. London: Verso Books. 2025. ISBN 9781836740308.

== See also ==
- Capitalocene – Term in climate politics
- Politics of climate change – Interaction of societies and governments with current climate change

Awards
Preceded by Tamás Krausz	Deutscher Memorial Prize; 2016	Succeeded by William Clare Roberts
