= List of Blumhouse Productions projects =

This is a list of various productions from Blumhouse Productions, which includes feature films, television projects, shorts, documentaries, video games, books, comics and podcasts.

== Feature films ==
=== 2000s ===
Release date	Title	Director(s)	Distributor
August 21, 2002	Hysterical Blindness	Mira Nair	HBO Films
November 20, 2006	Griffin & Phoenix	Ed Stone	Metro-Goldwyn-Mayer
June 13, 2007	The Fever	Carlo Gabriel Nero	HBO Films
July 31, 2007	The Darwin Awards	Finn Taylor	Icon Entertainment International
May 2, 2008	Graduation	Mike Mayer	Redwood Palms Pictures; Truly Indie
September 25, 2009	Paranormal Activity	Oren Peli	Paramount Pictures
November 10, 2009	The Accidental Husband	Griffin Dunne	Yari Film Group

=== 2010s ===
Release date	Title	Director(s)	Distributor
January 22, 2010	Tooth Fairy	Michael Lembeck	20th Century Fox
October 22, 2010	Paranormal Activity 2	Tod Williams	Paramount Pictures
April 1, 2011	Insidious	James Wan	FilmDistrict
October 21, 2011	Paranormal Activity 3	Henry Joost; Ariel Schulman	Paramount Pictures
August 3, 2012	The Babymakers	Jay Chandrasekhar	Millennium Entertainment
August 29, 2012	Lawless	John Hillcoat	The Weinstein Company
October 12, 2012	Sinister	Scott Derrickson	Summit Entertainment
October 19, 2012	Paranormal Activity 4	Henry Joost; Ariel Schulman	Paramount Pictures
November 2, 2012	The Bay	Barry Levinson	Lionsgate; Roadside Attractions
February 22, 2013	Dark Skies	Scott Stewart	Dimension Films
April 19, 2013	The Lords of Salem	Rob Zombie	Anchor Bay Films
June 7, 2013	The Purge	James DeMonaco	Universal Pictures
September 13, 2013	Insidious: Chapter 2	James Wan	FilmDistrict
September 13, 2013	Plush	Catherine Hardwicke	Millennium Entertainment
December 26, 2013	Best Night Ever	Jason Friedberg; Aaron Seltzer	Magnet Releasing
January 3, 2014	Paranormal Activity: The Marked Ones	Christopher Landon	Paramount Pictures
April 11, 2014	Oculus	Mike Flanagan	Relativity Media
April 18, 2014	13 Sins	Daniel Stamm	RADiUS-TWC; Dimension Films
May 9, 2014	Not Safe for Work	Joe Johnston	Universal Pictures
May 25, 2014	The Normal Heart	Ryan Murphy	HBO Films
July 18, 2014	The Purge: Anarchy	James DeMonaco	Universal Pictures
October 7, 2014	Mockingbird	Bryan Bertino	Universal Pictures
October 7, 2014	Mercy	Peter Cornwell	Universal Pictures
October 10, 2014	Whiplash	Damien Chazelle	Sony Pictures Classics
October 14, 2014	Stretch	Joe Carnahan	Universal Pictures
October 16, 2014	The Town That Dreaded Sundown	Alfonso Gomez-Rejon	Orion Pictures
October 24, 2014	Ouija	Stiles White	Universal Pictures
November 7, 2014	Jessabelle	Kevin Greutert	Lionsgate
January 23, 2015	The Boy Next Door	Rob Cohen	Universal Pictures
February 27, 2015	The Lazarus Effect	David Gelb	Relativity Media
April 17, 2015	Unfriended	Levan Gabriadze	Universal Pictures
May 15, 2015	Area 51	Oren Peli	Paramount Pictures
June 5, 2015	Insidious: Chapter 3	Leigh Whannell	Focus Features
June 23, 2015	Creep	Patrick Brice	The Orchard
July 2, 2015	Exeter	Marcus Nispel	Viva Pictures
July 10, 2015	The Gallows	Chris Lofing; Travis Cluff	Warner Bros. Pictures
August 7, 2015	The Gift	Joel Edgerton	STX Entertainment
August 21, 2015	Sinister 2	Ciarán Foy	Gramercy Pictures
September 11, 2015	The Visit	M. Night Shyamalan	Universal Pictures
September 25, 2015	The Green Inferno	Eli Roth	BH Tilt; High Top Releasing
October 23, 2015	Paranormal Activity: The Ghost Dimension	Gregory Plotkin	Paramount Pictures
October 23, 2015	Jem and the Holograms	Jon M. Chu	Universal Pictures
January 19, 2016	Visions	Kevin Greutert	Universal Pictures
January 19, 2016	Curve	Iain Softley	Universal Pictures
January 19, 2016	The Veil	Phil Joanou	Universal Pictures
January 22, 2016	Martyrs	Kevin Goetz; Michael Goetz	Anchor Bay Films
April 8, 2016	Hush	Mike Flanagan	Netflix
May 13, 2016	The Darkness	Greg McLean	BH Tilt; High Top Releasing
July 1, 2016	The Purge: Election Year	James DeMonaco	Universal Pictures
July 29, 2016	Viral	Henry Joost; Ariel Schulman	RADiUS-TWC; Dimension Films
October 21, 2016	In a Valley of Violence	Ti West	Focus World
October 21, 2016	Ouija: Origin of Evil	Mike Flanagan	Universal Pictures
December 2, 2016	Incarnate	Brad Peyton	BH Tilt; High Top Releasing
January 20, 2017	Split	M. Night Shyamalan	Universal Pictures
January 20, 2017	The Resurrection of Gavin Stone	Dallas Jenkins	BH Tilt; WWE Studios
February 24, 2017	Get Out	Jordan Peele	Universal Pictures
March 17, 2017	The Belko Experiment	Greg McLean	BH Tilt; Orion Pictures
April 28, 2017	Sleight	J. D. Dillard	BH Tilt; WWE Studios
May 12, 2017	Lowriders	Ricardo de Montreuil	BH Tilt; OTL Releasing
August 25, 2017	Birth of the Dragon	George Nolfi	BH Tilt; WWE Studios; OTL Releasing
October 13, 2017	Happy Death Day	Christopher Landon	Universal Pictures
October 24, 2017	Creep 2	Patrick Brice	The Orchard
October 28, 2017	Amityville: The Awakening	Franck Khalfoun	RADiUS-TWC; Dimension Films
October 31, 2017	Like. Share. Follow.	Glenn Gers	Cinemax
October 31, 2017	Totem	Marcel Sarmiento	Cinemax
January 5, 2018	Insidious: The Last Key	Adam Robitel	Universal Pictures
March 16, 2018	Benji	Brandon Camp	Netflix
April 13, 2018	Truth or Dare	Jeff Wadlow	Universal Pictures
April 17, 2018	Stephanie	Akiva Goldsman	Universal Pictures
May 4, 2018	Family Blood	Sonny Mallhi	Netflix
May 22, 2018	Delirium	Dennis Iliadis	Universal Pictures
June 1, 2018	Upgrade	Leigh Whannell	BH Tilt; OTL Releasing
July 4, 2018	The First Purge	Gerard McMurray	Universal Pictures
July 20, 2018	Unfriended: Dark Web	Stephen Susco	BH Tilt; OTL Releasing
July 24, 2018	The Keeping Hours	Karen Moncrieff	Universal Pictures
August 10, 2018	BlacKkKlansman	Spike Lee	Focus Features
October 5, 2018	Seven in Heaven	Chris Eigeman	Universal Pictures
October 19, 2018	Halloween	David Gordon Green	Universal Pictures
November 16, 2018	Cam	Daniel Goldhaber	Netflix
January 18, 2019	Glass	M. Night Shyamalan	Universal Pictures
February 13, 2019	Happy Death Day 2U	Christopher Landon	Universal Pictures
March 22, 2019	Us	Jordan Peele	Universal Pictures
March 31, 2019	Mercy Black	Owen Egerton	Netflix
April 12, 2019	Stockholm	Robert Budreau	Smith Global Media
April 14, 2019	Thriller	Dallas Jackson	Netflix
May 31, 2019	Ma	Tate Taylor	Universal Pictures
August 30, 2019	Don't Let Go	Jacob Aaron Estes	BH Tilt; OTL Releasing
September 20, 2019	Bloodline	Henry Jacobson	Momentum Pictures
September 27, 2019	Prey	Franck Khalfoun	Cinedigm
October 22, 2019	Sweetheart	J. D. Dillard	Universal Pictures
October 25, 2019	The Gallows Act II	Chris Lofing; Travis Cluff	Lionsgate
November 1, 2019	Adopt a Highway	Logan Marshall-Green	RLJE Films
December 13, 2019	Black Christmas	Sophia Takal	Universal Pictures

=== 2020s ===
Release date	Title	Director(s)	Distributor
February 14, 2020	Fantasy Island	Jeff Wadlow	Sony Pictures Releasing
February 28, 2020	The Invisible Man	Leigh Whannell	Universal Pictures
March 13, 2020	The Hunt	Craig Zobel	Universal Pictures
June 18, 2020	You Should Have Left	David Koepp	Universal Pictures
October 6, 2020	The Lie	Veena Sud	Amazon Studios
October 6, 2020	Black Box	Emmanuel Osei-Kuffour Jr.	Amazon Studios
October 13, 2020	Evil Eye	Elan Dassani; Rajeev Dassani	Amazon Studios
October 13, 2020	Nocturne	Zu Quirke	Amazon Studios
October 28, 2020	The Craft: Legacy	Zoe Lister-Jones	Sony Pictures Releasing
November 13, 2020	Freaky	Christopher Landon	Universal Pictures
February 26, 2021	The Vigil	Keith Thomas	IFC Midnight
July 2, 2021	The Forever Purge	Everardo Valerio Gout	Universal Pictures
September 17, 2021	This Is the Night	James DeMonaco	Universal Pictures
October 1, 2021	Bingo Hell	Gigi Saul Guerrero	Amazon Studios
October 1, 2021	Black as Night	Maritte Lee Go	Amazon Studios
October 8, 2021	Madres	Ryan Zaragoza	Amazon Studios
October 8, 2021	The Manor	Axelle Carolyn	Amazon Studios
October 15, 2021	Halloween Kills	David Gordon Green	Universal Pictures
October 29, 2021	Paranormal Activity: Next of Kin	William Eubank	Paramount+
November 5, 2021	The Deep House	Julien Maury; Alexandre Bustillo	Epix
November 19, 2021	A House on the Bayou	Alex McAulay	Epix
December 10, 2021	Hurt	Sonny Mallhi	Gravitas Ventures
December 10, 2021	American Refugee	Ali LeRoi	Epix
May 13, 2022	Firestarter	Keith Thomas	Universal Pictures
May 20, 2022	Torn Hearts	Brea Grant	Epix
June 3, 2022	Dashcam	Rob Savage	Momentum Pictures
June 3, 2022	Unhuman	Marcus Dunstan	Epix
June 24, 2022	The Black Phone	Scott Derrickson	Universal Pictures
July 29, 2022	Vengeance	B. J. Novak	Focus Features
August 5, 2022	They/Them	John Logan	Peacock
October 5, 2022	Mr. Harrigan's Phone	John Lee Hancock	Netflix
October 7, 2022	The Visitor	Justin P. Lange	Epix
October 14, 2022	Halloween Ends	David Gordon Green	Universal Pictures
October 28, 2022	Run Sweetheart Run	Shana Feste	Amazon Studios
November 4, 2022	Soft & Quiet	Beth de Araújo	Momentum Pictures
November 23, 2022	Nanny	Nikyatu Jusu	Amazon Studios
January 6, 2023	M3GAN	Gerard Johnstone	Universal Pictures
January 13, 2023	Sick	John Hyams	Peacock
January 17, 2023	There's Something Wrong with the Children	Roxanne Benjamin	MGM+
March 7, 2023	Unseen	Yoko Okumura	MGM+
July 7, 2023	Insidious: The Red Door	Patrick Wilson	Sony Pictures Releasing
August 4, 2023	The Passenger	Carter Smith	MGM+
October 6, 2023	Totally Killer	Nahnatchka Khan	Amazon MGM Studios
October 6, 2023	The Exorcist: Believer	David Gordon Green	Universal Pictures
October 27, 2023	Five Nights at Freddy's	Emma Tammi	Universal Pictures
January 5, 2024	Night Swim	Bryce McGuire	Universal Pictures
March 8, 2024	Imaginary	Jeff Wadlow	Lionsgate
August 30, 2024	Afraid	Chris Weitz	Sony Pictures Releasing
September 13, 2024	Speak No Evil	James Watkins	Universal Pictures
October 3, 2024	House of Spoils	Bridget Savage Cole; Danielle Krudy	Amazon MGM Studios
January 17, 2025	Wolf Man	Leigh Whannell	Universal Pictures
March 28, 2025	The Woman in the Yard	Jaume Collet-Serra	Universal Pictures
April 11, 2025	Drop	Christopher Landon	Universal Pictures
June 27, 2025	M3GAN 2.0	Gerard Johnstone	Universal Pictures
September 19, 2025	The Lost Bus	Paul Greengrass	Apple TV+
October 17, 2025	Black Phone 2	Scott Derrickson	Universal Pictures
October 30, 2025	No me sigas	Ximena García Lecuona; Eduardo Lecuona	Cinépolis Distribución
December 5, 2025	Five Nights at Freddy's 2	Emma Tammi	Universal Pictures
April 17, 2026	Lee Cronin's The Mummy	Lee Cronin	Warner Bros. Pictures
May 15, 2026	Obsession	Curry Barker	Focus Features
June 26, 2026	Strung	Malcolm D. Lee	Peacock
August 1, 2026	Soulm8te	Kate Dolan	Universal Pictures Home Entertainment
August 21, 2026	Insidious: Out of the Further	Jacob Chase	Sony Pictures Releasing
September 10, 2026	The Uprising	Paul Greengrass	Focus Features
September 15, 2026	The Last Kiss	Yoko Okumura	Universal Pictures Home Entertainment
October 9, 2026	Other Mommy	Rob Savage	Universal Pictures

=== Upcoming films ===
Release date	Title	Director(s)	Distributor
January 15, 2027	River	Joshua Giuliano	Universal Pictures
February 26, 2027	The Revenge of La Llorona	Santiago Menghini	Warner Bros. Pictures
March 12, 2027	The Exorcist: Martyrs	Mike Flanagan	Universal Pictures
April 2, 2027	Play House	Nicolas Curcio	Focus Features
May 7, 2027	Anything but Ghosts	Curry Barker	Focus Features
August 13, 2027	Untitled film	—N/a	Universal Pictures
August 27, 2027	Molepeople	Ben Wheatley	Paramount Pictures
September 10, 2027	The Conjuring: First Communion	Rodigue Huart	Warner Bros. Pictures
September 24, 2027	Blair Witch Project	Dylan Clark	Lionsgate
October 8, 2027	Sleepover	Jacob Chase	Universal Pictures
October 22, 2027	Paranormal Activity	Ian Tuason	Paramount Pictures
November 12, 2027	Seasons	Drew Hancock	Amazon MGM Studios
October 27, 2028	Untitled film	—N/a	Universal Pictures

=== Undated films ===
Title	Director(s)	Distributor
Boogeyman Pop	Brad Michael Elmore	Shudder
Merrily We Roll Along	Richard Linklater	Universal Pictures
Occupant	Joshua Giuliano	Focus Features

== Short films ==
Year	Title	Director	Release date
2013	Whiplash	Damien Chazelle	January 18, 2013
2015	Fifteen	Gavin Michael Booth	October 29, 2015
2021	Shadowprowler	Scott Derrickson	September 25, 2021
2024	I H8 AI	Aneesh Chaganty	October 17, 2024
2024	Electric Sheep	Casey Affleck	October 18, 2024
2026	Bill's Favorite Snack	Joe Grode	September 16, 2026
2026	Man at the Bottom of the Bag	Joe Blaugrund	October 12, 2026

== Documentary films ==
Year	Title	Director	Release date	Ref.
2006	Stagedoor	Alexandra Shiva	May 24, 2006	
2015	How to Dance in Ohio	Alexandra Shiva	October 26, 2015	
2017	Election Day: Lens Across America	Henry Jacobson; Emma Tammi	January 17, 2017	
2017	Alive and Kicking	Susan Glatzer	April 7, 2017	
2018	This Is Home: A Refugee Story	Alexandra Shiva	April 6, 2018	
2018	Bathtubs Over Broadway	Dava Whisenant	November 30, 2018	
2019	Liberty: Mother of Exiles	Fenton Bailey; Randy Barbato	October 17, 2019	
2020	Kill Chain: The Cyber War on America's Elections	Simon Ardizzone; Russell Michaels; Sarah Teale	March 26, 2020	
2020	A Secret Love	Chris Bolan	April 29, 2020	
2021	Groomed	Gwen van de Pas	March 18, 2021	
2021	Pray Away	Kristine Stolakis	August 3, 2021	
2021	Pharma Bro	Brent Hodge	October 5, 2021	
2022	Exposure	Holly Morris	March 7, 2022	
2022	Our Father	Lucie Jourdan	May 11, 2022	
2022	The Youth Governor	Matthew Halmy; Jaron Halmy	August 26, 2022	

== Television series ==
Year	Title	Premiere date	Ref.
2012	The River	February 7, 2012	
2013	Stranded	February 27, 2013	
2014	Ascension	December 15, 2014	
2015	Eye Candy	January 12, 2015	
2015	The Jinx	February 8, 2015	
2015	Real Scares	April 13, 2015	
2015–2016	Hellevator	October 21, 2015	
2015	#15SecondScare	October 22, 2015	
2015	South of Hell	November 27, 2015	
2016	Judgment Day: Prison or Parole?	May 22, 2016	
2016	#Room301	October 20, 2016	
2016	12 Deadly Days	December 12, 2016	
2017	Cold Case Files	February 27, 2017	
2018	Sharp Objects	July 8, 2018	
2018–2020	Sacred Lies	July 27, 2018	
2018	Ghoul	August 24, 2018	
2018–2019	The Purge	September 4, 2018	
2018–2021	Into the Dark	October 5, 2018	
2019	Smiley Face Killers: The Hunt for Justice	January 19, 2019	
2019	The Loudest Voice	June 30, 2019	
2019	No One Saw a Thing	August 1, 2019	
2020	Betaal	May 24, 2020	
2020	A Wilderness of Error	September 25, 2020	
2020	The Good Lord Bird	October 4, 2020	
2020	History's Greatest Mysteries	November 14, 2020	
2021	Florida Man Murders	January 9, 2021	
2021	The People v. the Klan	April 11, 2021	
2021	Fall River	May 16, 2021	
2021	Relentless	June 28, 2021	
2021	What Happened, Brittany Murphy?	October 14, 2021	
2021	Ten Weeks	November 11, 2021	
2022–present	Worst Roommate Ever	March 1, 2022	
2022	The Thing About Pam	March 8, 2022	
2022	The Anarchists	July 10, 2022	
2022	Blumhouse's Compendium of Horror	October 2, 2022	
2022	Dangerous Breed: Crime. Cons. Cats.	November 22, 2022	
2023	Floribama Murders	January 7, 2023	
2023	True Crime Story: Look Into My Eyes	June 15, 2023	
2023	The Horror of Dolores Roach	July 7, 2023	
2024	Choir	January 31, 2024	
2024–present	Worst Ex Ever	August 28, 2024	
2024	Cabin in the Woods	September 9, 2024	
2024	Killer Cakes	October 8, 2024	
2024	The Sticky	December 6, 2024	
2025	The Bondsman	April 3, 2025	
2025–present	The Rainmaker	August 15, 2025	
2025	Nightmares of Nature	September 30, 2025	
2026–present	Scarpetta	March 11, 2026	
2026–present	Worst Neighbor Ever	July 1, 2026	

== Books ==
Year	Title	Author	Publication date	Ref.
2015	The Blumhouse Book of Nightmares: The Haunted City	Various Authors	July 7, 2015	
2016	The Apartment	S. L. Grey	October 4, 2016	
2017	Feral	James DeMonaco; B. K. Evenson	April 4, 2017	
2017	Meddling Kids	Edgar Cantero	July 11, 2017	
2017	Haunted Nights	Various Authors	October 3, 2017	
2018	This Body's Not Big Enough for Both of Us	Edgar Cantero	July 31, 2018	
2018	Bad Man	Dathan Auerbach	August 7, 2018	
2018	Hark! The Herald Angels Scream	Various Authors	October 23, 2018	
2019	Happy Death Day & Happy Death Day 2U	Aaron Hartzler	February 19, 2019	
2020	The Invisible Man (Movie Tie-in)	H. G. Wells	February 4, 2020	
2020	Final Cuts: New Tales of Hollywood Horror and Other Spectacles	Various Authors	June 2, 2020	
2025	Horror's New Wave: 15 Years of Blumhouse	Dave Schilling	September 30, 2025	

=== Upcoming books ===
Title	Author	Publication date	Ref.
Fear the Spotlight: Fight Through the Fear	Patricia Villeto	—N/a	

=== Comic books ===
Year	Title	Writer	Release date	Notes	Ref.
2017	Sleight	Ryan Parrott	March 30, 2017	Tie-in prequel comic to Sleight (2016).	
2026	Something Is Killing the Children #1	James Tynion IV	—N/a	Reissue of the 2019 comic.	

== Podcasts ==
Year	Title	Creator(s)
2016–2020	Shock Waves	Rob Galluzzo; Elric Kane; Rebekah McKendry; Ryan Turek
2018	Post Mortem with Mick Garris	Mick Garris
2018–2021	Fear Initiative	Clarke Wolfe; Morgan Peter Brown; Cara Mandel; Josh Forbes; Megan Duffy; Jeff Seidman; David Ian McKendry; Rob Schrab
2018–2021	Attack of the Queerwolf!	Michael Kennedy; M. A. Fortin; Nay Bever; Brennan Klein
2018	The Oval Office Tapes	R. J. Cutler
2020–2023	13 Days of Halloween	Aaron Mahnke
2021	Mordeo	Alex Kemp
2021	Revelations	Jennings Brown
2023	The Mantawauk Caves	Dan Bush
2024	Dream Sequence	Andrew Martin Robinson
2025	The Hookup	Noah Feinberg

== Video games ==
Release date	Title	Developer	Ref.
October 22, 2024	Fear the Spotlight	Cozy Game Pals	
August 27, 2025	Eyes of Hellfire	Gambrinous	
December 2, 2025	Sleep Awake	Eyes Out	
February 10, 2026	Crisol: Theater of Idols	Vermila Studios	

=== Upcoming games ===
Release date	Title	Developer	Ref.
March 9, 2027	Grave Seasons	Perfect Garbage	

== Theatre ==
Premiere	Title	Playwright(s)	Director(s)	Ref.
January 18, 2025	Insidious: The Further You Fear	Carl Grose	Toby Park; Aitor Basauri	
August 14, 2026	Paranormal Activity	Levi Holloway	Felix Barrett	

== See also ==
- Jason Blum
- Atomic Monster
- Monkeypaw Productions
- Platinum Dunes
- Blinding Edge Pictures
- Divide/Conquer
- Neon
- Dark Castle Entertainment
- Ghost House Pictures
- Twisted Pictures
- Vertigo Entertainment
- Gold Circle Films
