= Eva Reign =

American actress

- Born: June 20, 1996 (age 29); St. Louis, Missouri, U.S.
- Occupations: Actress, journalist
- Years active: 2019–present
- Awards: Peabody Award; GLAAD Media Award
- Website: msevareign.com

Eva Reign (born June 20, 1996) is an American actress, journalist, and writer. She is best known for lead role in the 2022 Amazon Prime Video American coming-of-age romantic comedy film Anything's Possible. Reign has written for Vogue, New York, Them, Highsnobiety, and PAPER. She is a recipient of a Peabody Award and a GLAAD Media Award for her work as a correspondent in the Vice News documentary series Transnational.

== Biography ==
Reign is from St. Louis, Missouri. Growing up, she performed in school plays and community theatre productions.

Reign moved to New York City in 2018 and was a summer fellow for the Condé Nast publication Them. She was later promoted to Assistant Editor. While at Them, she interviewed many LGBTQ+ public figures such as Hector Xtravaganza, Gigi Gorgeous, Nikita Dragun and Jari Jones.

In 2019, she starred in Tourmaline's short film Salacia, about the transgender woman Mary Jones. The film is now part of the Museum of Modern Art's permanent collection. In 2020, she starred in the comedy web series Sideways Smile. In 2021, Reign was mentored by Tourmaline through the Queer|Art|Mentorship program.

Reign made her film debut as Kelsa in Ximena García Lecuona's and Billy Porter's 2022 American coming-of-age romantic comedy film Anything's Possible, which premiered on Amazon Prime Video in July 2022. She accompanied Porter to the 75th Tony Awards in June 2022.

She won a Peabody Award and a GLAAD Media Award for her work as a correspondent in the Vice News documentary series Transnational, which explored the experiences of transgender people and trans communities throughout the world. Reign hosted the series premiere episode, Love Us in the Light, which focused on the life of Kelly Stough, a trans woman from Detroit, who is a member of the House of Ebony ballroom family.

She has written for Vogue, New York, Them, Highsnobiety, and PAPER.

In 2022, she was named to the Forbes magazine's Forbes 30 Under 30 and Out magazine's Out100.

== Filmography ==
=== Film ===
Year	Title	Role	Notes	Ref.
2019	Salacia	Trans Woman	Short Film	
2022	Anything's Possible	Kelsa	Main Role	

=== Television ===
Year	Title	Role	Notes	Ref.
2020	Sideways Smile	Jessie	Web Series	

== Awards ==
Year	Award	Category	Project	Ref.
2021	Peabody Awards	News	Transnational	
2022	33rd GLAAD Media Awards	Outstanding Online Journalism – Video or Multimedia	Transnational	
