= Wade Wilson (disambiguation) =

Wade Wilson is the secret identity of the Marvel character Deadpool.

- Wade Wilson (film character), the adaptation of the character in film
- Wade DeFarge, a DC Comics character better known as Ravager and sometimes referred to by the surname of his half-brother, "Wilson"
- Wade Wilson (criminal), American criminal convicted murdering two women on the same day in 2019, often called the "Deadpool Killer" due to sharing his name with the Marvel comics character
- Wade Wilson (American football) (1959–2019), American football player
