= Your Mother Your Mother Your Mother =

2026 film by Bassam Tariq

- Theatrical release poster
- Directed by: Bassam Tariq
- Written by: Bassam Tariq
- Produced by: Bassam Tariq; Lucan Toh; Babak Anvari
- Starring: Mahershala Ali; John Cho; Giancarlo Esposito; Abubakr Ali; Tramell Tillman; Tiffany Boone; Laith Nakli
- Cinematography: Katelin Arizmendi
- Edited by: Cam McLauchlin
- Music by: Son Lux
- Production companies: Orion Pictures; Two & Two Pictures
- Distributed by: Amazon MGM Studios
- Release dates: September 12, 2026 (TIFF); September 25, 2026 (United States)
- Running time: 112 minutes
- Country: United States
- Language: English
- Box office: $4 million

Your Mother Your Mother Your Mother is a 2026 American action thriller film written and directed by Bassam Tariq, starring Mahershala Ali, John Cho, Giancarlo Esposito, Abubakr Ali, Tramell Tillman, Tiffany Boone, and Laith Nakli.

The film premiered at the 2026 Toronto International Film Festival, and had a limited theatrical release in the United States by Amazon MGM Studios on September 25, 2026. It received widespread praise from critics.

== Plot ==
Latif, an ex-military hitman who works for security specialist Mike Mahmoudi, finishes a job in St. Louis before receiving a phone call from his daughter Fatiha telling him that Khadijah, his wife and her mother, died suddenly. Latif returns to his home in Houston for the funeral, reuniting with his family, including Fatiha, his son Qadir, and his infant daughter Aziza. A devout Muslim, Latif experiences a crisis of faith as he mourns his wife and struggles to care for his children.

Khadijah's supply of breast milk begins to run low, and Latif learns that Aziza cannot digest formula. He goes to the local mosque with his family to see if they can find a breast milk donation, where he runs into Mike and his nephew, Hatty, who runs a Muslim-themed porn studio. Mike tells Latif that a Charismatic Christian leader named Hwan Yoon plans to murder Hatty, believing that his porn studio is a front for human trafficking, and orders Latif to kill Hwan before that happens. Aziza is fed by Fugazi, a former employee of Hatty's who happens to be lactating.

Latif solicits his brother Talib, a physician assistant who disapproves of Latif's criminal lifestyle, for a prescription he can bring to the milk bank, but the bank is closed by the time he returns. Out of desperation, he drives to Hatty's mansion and asks him to bring him to Fugazi so she can feed Aziza again. Hatty initially refuses unless Latif kills Hwan, then threatens Latif's children; Latif overpowers him and handcuffs him in the backseat, where he guides him to the strip club where Fugazi works.

While Fugazi feeds Aziza, Hwan enters their private room, revealing that the strip club is now a church and that Fugazi became one of his followers after leaving Hatty. He thanks Latif, believing he brought Hatty for him to kill; Latif fights Hwan and his men, taking back Aziza from Fugazi and reuniting with an escaped Hatty. Latif, his children, and Hatty sit down at a restaurant to break the fast, but Hwan catches up to them and captures Hatty.

After being driven home by Latif's imam, Abdul Malik, Latif announces that they will go to Mexico. Learning that Mike and his men have come to their apartment complex, he has his children hide in the Mormon missionaries' apartment nearby as he returns to his apartment to grab more breast milk from the refrigerator. He is ambushed by Mike, who is furious that he let Hatty be captured; he kills Mike's henchmen, then Mike himself. Latif collects his children and drives to the mosque, where he finds that Abdul Malik was murdered by Hwan's men.

Latif leaves his children at Talib's house and says goodbye to them before driving to Hatty's mansion, which has since been taken over by Hwan. Hatty is bound to a chair, having been tortured in order to be "taught a lesson." Latif offers to help, but cuts Hatty free with his sword and engages in a fight with Hwan's men. Hwan shoots Latif several times with an assault rifle, apparently killing him. As he lies bleeding on the ground, he hears his daughter praying for him to return home, and miraculously returns to life. Awestruck, Hwan allows both Latif and Hatty to leave, and Latif reunites with his children.

== Cast ==
- Mahershala Ali as Latif
- John Cho as Hwan Yoon, a religious leader
- Giancarlo Esposito as Abdul Malik
- Abubakr Ali as Hatty
- Tramell Tillman as Talib
- Tiffany Boone as Fugazi
- Laith Nakli as Mike Mahmoudi
- Adia as Fatiha, Latif's daughter
- Jahleel Kamara as Qadir, Latif's son
- John Henry Ward as Elder Wade
- Ashley P. Jones as Dana
- Aaron Goodson as Khalis

== Production ==
=== Development and filming ===
In February 2025, it was announced that Bassam Tariq would write and direct an original film titled Your Mother Your Mother Your Mother with Mahershala Ali set to star. Principal photography began in March 2025, in Atlanta. Ali met Tariq when the latter was hired to direct the former in the planned Marvel Cinematic Universe (MCU) film Blade, but Tariq departed the project in September 2022 just months before production was supposed to start. Ali eventually left the long-stalled project after multiple delays by July 2026. Throughout its development, Ali acquired the necessary skills to portray the titular character, and following his departure, reconnected with Tariq to use his training in Your Mother Your Mother Your Mother. Tariq was inspired to write the film after a near-tragedy in his own life and Ali eagerly signed on in a reunion that Tariq always envisioned. The rest of the cast was announced in April, including John Cho and Giancarlo Esposito. Filming wrapped on May 29, 2025.

=== Title ===
The title is a reference to an Islamic tradition, told in multiple hadith, where a man approached the Prophet Muhammad and asked some variation of "Who is most deserving of good treatment?" to which the Prophet replied "Your mother". The man repeated the question twice more, both times to which the Prophet repeated "Your mother". It was only when the man asked the fourth time, that the Prophet replied "Your father".

=== Music ===
In May 2025, Son Lux revealed that they would compose the score for the film. The soundtrack album contains 18 cues and was released on September 25, 2026.

== Release ==
Your Mother Your Mother Your Mother had its world premiere at the 2026 Toronto International Film Festival on September 12, 2026. It had a limited theatrical release in the United States by Amazon MGM Studios on September 25, 2026, with expansions in subsequent weeks in October.

In conjunction with the film's scheduled premiere at TIFF, Tariq was named the recipient of the Rising Talent Award for the TIFF Tribute Awards.

== Reception ==
=== Critical reception ===
On the review aggregator website Rotten Tomatoes, 96% of 120 critics' reviews are positive, with an average rating of 8.0/10. The website’s consensus reads: "Delivering unabashedly pulpy thrills without diminishing its big heart, Your Mother Your Mother Your Mother is an inventive and tonally unique action flick where Mahershala Ali's soulful performance cuts deepest of all." Metacritic, which uses a weighted average, assigned the film a score of 83 out of 100, based on 31 critics, indicating "universal acclaim".

=== Accolades ===
Award	Date of ceremony	Category	Nominee(s)	Result	Ref.
Hollywood Music in Media Awards	November 18, 2026	Best Original Score – Feature Film	Son Lux	Nominated	
Gotham Independent Film Awards	November 30, 2026	Best Feature	Bassam Tariq, Babak Anvari, Lucan Toh	Pending	
Gotham Independent Film Awards	November 30, 2026	Outstanding Lead Performance	Mahershala Ali	Pending	
Gotham Independent Film Awards	November 30, 2026	Breakthrough Performer	Adia	Pending	
