= Amy Israel =

American film and television executive

- Born: Brooklyn, New York, United States
- Education: Oberlin College
- Occupations: Film and television executive, producer
- Spouse: RD Robb

Amy Israel is an American film and television executive and producer. She is currently the President of Television at Peter Chernin's North Road Company.

== Career ==
Before joining the North Road Company, she was the Executive Vice President of Original Programming for Showtime Networks.

Prior to joining Showtime Networks, Israel held leadership roles at New Regency Productions, Paramount Vantage, The Orphanage, and Miramax Films. Israel founded Blum Israel Productions with producer Jason Blum.

She is a member of the Producers Guild of America. Israel is also an ambassador for ReFrame, an organization whose mission is to create a more gender-representative film and television industry on all levels. She is a member of Studio Advisory Board for Reboot Studios, an organization that provides seed investments to develop Jewish content. Israel is also a member of Lunch Partners, a venture capital fund that invests in early stage companies.

As of 2026, Israel was named to the Peabody Awards board.

== Personal life ==
Israel was born and raised in Brooklyn, New York. She is the daughter of Robert Israel and Ellen Israel, who ran the Kentshire Galleries in New York City, founded by her grandfather, dealing in period jewelry, vintage costume jewelry, and fine antique English furniture.

Her sister is Laurie Israel who is a three-time Daytime Emmy Award nominee for her work on children's television programming.

Israel graduated from Oberlin College with a major in Art History.

She lives in Los Angeles with her husband, RD Robb, and her two children.

== Recognition ==
- The Hollywood Reporter named Israel to their Women in Entertainment Power 100 list first in 2007 during her tenure at Paramount Vantage and again in 2022 while at the helm of Showtime Networks.
- CableFax named her one of the Most Powerful Women in 2019, 2020, 2021 and 2022.
- She was named one of Multichannel News Wonder Women in 2022.

== Filmography ==
=== Television ===
| Year | Title | Episode Count | Credit |
|---|---|---|---|
| 2026 | The Body | 8 | Executive Producer |
| 2025 | Bad Boy | 8 | Executive Producer |
| 2024 | Ripley | 8 | Network Executive |
| 2023 | Fellow Travelers | 8 | Network Executive |
| 2023 | Three Women | 10 | Network Executive |
| 2023 | The Curse | 10 | Network Executive |
| 2023 | The Woman in the Wall | 6 | Network Executive |
| 2023 | Dreaming Whilst Black | 6 | Network Executive |
| 2021–2023 | Yellowjackets | 19 | Network Executive |
| 2016–2023 | Billions | 84 | Network Executive |
| 2022 | Let the Right One In | 10 | Network Executive |
| 2022 | The Man Who Fell to Earth | 10 | Network Executive |
| 2022 | I Love That for You | 8 | Network Executive |
| 2022 | The First Lady | 10 | Network Executive |
| 2022 | Super Pumped | 7 | Network Executive |
| 2021 | American Rust | 9 | Network Executive |
| 2019–2021 | Black Monday | 30 | Network Executive |
| 2020 | The Good Lord Bird | 7 | Network Executive |
| 2019 | On Becoming a God in Central Florida | 10 | Network Executive |
| 2017–2019 | SMILF | 18 | Network Executive |
| 2014–2018 | The Affair | 30 | Network Executive |
| 2016–2017 | Dice | 7 | Network Executive |
| 2013–2016 | Masters of Sex | 46 | Network Executive |
| 2015 | Happyish | 10 | Network Executive |
| 2014 | 7 Deadly Sins | 7 | Network Executive |

=== Film ===
| Year | Title | Credit |
|---|---|---|
| 2011 | In Time | Executive Producer |
| 2009 | The Goods: Live Hard, Sell Hard | Studio Executive |
| 2008 | Defiance | Studio Executive |
| 2008 | Revolutionary Road | Studio Executive |
| 2008 | The Duchess | Studio Executive |
| 2008 | American Teen | Network Executive, Studio Executive |
| 2007 | There Will Be Blood | Studio Executive |
| 2007 | Into the Wild | Network Executive |
| 2007 | Margot at the Wedding | Studio Executive |
| 2007 | A Mighty Heart | Studio Executive |
| 2007 | No Country for Old Men | Studio Executive |
| 2007 | Son of Rambow | Studio Executive |
| 2007 | Year of the Dog | Studio Executive |
| 2006 | Griffin & Phoenix | Producer |
| 2006 | An Inconvenient Truth | Network Executive |
| 2004 | Shall We Dance? | Co-Executive Producer |
| 2002 | Hysterical Blindness | Executive Producer |
| 2001 | The Others | Studio Executive |
| 1999 | Outside Providence | Studio Executive |
| 1999 | Happy, Texas | Studio Executive |
| 1999 | A Walk on the Moon | Studio Executive |
| 1998 | Smoke Signals | Studio Executive |
| 1997 | Life Is Beautiful | Studio Executive |
| 1997 | Air Bud | Studio Executive |
| 1997 | Princess Mononoke | Studio Executive |
| 1996 | Swingers | Studio Executive |
| 1996 | Sling Blade | Studio Executive |
| 1996 | Basquiat | Studio Executive |
| 1996 | Trainspotting | Studio Executive |
| 1996 | Walking and Talking | Studio Executive |
| 1996 | Shall We Dance? | Studio Executive |
| 1995 | Georgia | Studio Executive |
| 1995 | Kids | Studio Executive |
| 1994 | Bullets over Broadway | Studio Executive |
| 1994 | The Postman | Studio Executive |
| 1994 | Priest | Studio Executive |
| 1994 | Chungking Express | Studio Executive |
| 1994 | Clerks | Studio Executive |

== See also ==
- Peter Chernin
- Jason Blum
- David Nevins (television producer)
