= No me sigas =

Horror film by Ximena García Lecuona and Eduardo Lecuona

- Theatrical release poster
- Directed by: Ximena García Lecuona; Eduardo Lecuona
- Screenplay by: Ximena García Lecuona
- Produced by: Jonathan Davis; Eduardo Lecuona; Javier Sepulveda; Francisco Sánchez Solís
- Starring: Karla Coronado; Julia Maqueo; Yankel Stevan
- Cinematography: Selene Berazueta
- Edited by: Diego Cohen
- Music by: Craig Davis Pinson
- Production companies: Blumhouse Productions; Maligno Gorehouse; Wild Sheep Content; Edge Films; Cinépolis
- Distributed by: Cinépolis Distribución
- Release dates: October 14, 2025 (FICM); October 30, 2025
- Running time: 83 minutes
- Country: Mexico
- Language: Spanish
- Box office: $1.3 million

No me sigas (lit. 'Don't Follow Me') is a 2025 Mexican supernatural horror film directed by Ximena García Lecuona and Eduardo Lecuona (in their directorial debut) and written by García Lecuona. It stars Karla Coronado, Julia Maqueo and Yankel Stevan. The film is produced by Blumhouse Productions and is their first Spanish original film.

No me sigas had its premiere at the Morelia International Film Festival on October 14, 2025, and was released in Mexico on October 30, 2025, by Cinépolis Distribución.

== Plot ==
After moving into an apartment rumored to be haunted, aspiring content creator Carla Anaya begins documenting the alleged paranormal activity in hopes of increasing her subscriber count and earning the YouTube Silver Creator Award. Following advice from her friend and fellow YouTuber Sam France, Carla turns the haunting into an online series that quickly attracts attention.

One night, after Sam cancels plans to meet her at a party, Carla invites Andrés — a friend who helped her secure the apartment — to spend the night with her. Although there is a clear mutual attraction between them, their relationship never becomes official. Days later, Sam visits Carla and expresses her distrust of Andrés, criticizing the ambiguous nature of their relationship. While browsing his social media accounts, the two discover photographs of him with a woman significantly older than he is. Carla dismisses the discovery, assuming the woman may be his mother, and shifts the conversation toward ways to improve her channel’s performance. In response, Sam encourages her to make her content more intense and admits that her online persona is largely fabricated, explaining that she has to project confidence and charisma for her audience.

Following Sam’s advice, Carla and Sam stage a fake paranormal ritual in which Carla appears to be attacked by a spirit. The video quickly goes viral, causing Carla’s subscriber count to rise rapidly. However, over the following days, several viewers begin pointing out strange figures appearing in the background of her recordings. The comments heighten Carla’s anxiety, and she soon begins experiencing seemingly supernatural events herself, including an incident in which a plastic bag nearly suffocates her while she tests an infrared camera, as well as the appearance of a stain on her bed that gradually spreads and decays over time.

In one of her videos, Carla gains access to the apartments on the upper floor with the help of the building’s caretaker. Inside one of the units, abandoned after a fire years earlier, she discovers a VHS tape marked with occult symbols. While investigating them alongside Andrés, the two learn that the symbols are linked to a supposed order of necromancers who practiced rituals intended to communicate with the dead. At the same time, Carla begins to suspect through social media activity that Sam and Andrés share a closer relationship than they have admitted. Her suspicions are confirmed when she discovers that the two attended the same party she was unable to go to, leaving her emotionally devastated.

Despite their recent falling out, Carla invites Sam back to film another video. This time, the two attempt to record an alleged electronic voice phenomenon using a specialized recorder, asking the apartment’s supposed spirit a series of yes-or-no questions. When no response is detected, Carla confronts Sam during the recording about her relationship with Andrés. Sam coldly replies that she has only been helping Carla out of pity and warns her not to trust him, insisting that there is something unsettling about his behavior. As Sam prepares to leave, Carla notices her dog, Valeriana, barking aggressively toward the closet.

Later that night, unable to sleep, Carla inspects the closet and discovers written responses on one of its walls corresponding to the questions asked during the video, including confirmation that the entity intends to harm her. Increasingly disturbed, Carla arranges to have the VHS tape restored. However, upon returning to her apartment, she finds the front door open and her dog missing. After searching the apartment, she discovers Valeriana’s remains and shares both the incident and the evidence from the closet on social media. Convinced that Carla is fabricating the events for attention, Sam permanently cuts ties with her. With no one else to turn to, Carla contacts Andrés and asks him to stay with her.

After arriving at the apartment, Andrés confesses that he feels guilty for having wished, during his mother’s final days, to free himself from the burden of caring for her. Shortly afterward, as the two are about to become intimate, Andrés notices the cameras installed throughout the apartment and assumes Carla intends to secretly record him for her content. Furious, he storms out. From that moment onward, the paranormal activity intensifies: Carla captures the entity’s manifestation in one of the rooms using the infrared camera, while additional occult symbols begin appearing throughout the apartment’s walls and furniture.

Carla investigates the symbols and discovers online that they belong to a necromantic sect known as “The Watchers”, which is rumored to still operate in modern times. Shortly afterward, she begins receiving notifications on social media revealing that Sam has uploaded a video debunking Carla’s channel, claiming that the alleged paranormal events were staged and insisting that Valeriana is still alive. The video sparks a massive backlash against Carla, causing her to steadily lose both credibility and subscribers. Later, Carla receives the restored footage from the VHS tape by email. The recording features a woman addressing her lover, claiming that she has survived for centuries by transferring her consciousness from one body to another through pagan rituals. The tape also implies that the woman died in the apartment directly above Carla’s.

Determined to uncover the truth, Carla enters the upstairs apartment and finds it filled with candles. Inside, she discovers the body of Andrés’ mother positioned directly above the area corresponding to the stain in her own bedroom below. Moments later, Andrés appears behaving erratically and attempts to reconcile with her. Carla tries to escape, but after struggling with him she is cornered by several members of the sect, who capture her in order to perform a ritual.

During the ceremony, the elderly woman’s deteriorated body is used to transfer her consciousness into Carla’s body. Some time later, Carla — now possessed by the entity — thanks Andrés for providing her with a new host body. Together, they join the upper class as members of “The Watchers”, revealing both the sect’s continued existence and its influence within high society.

== Cast ==
- Karla Coronado as Carla
- Julia Maqueo as Sam France
- Yankel Stevan as Andrés

== Production ==
In November 2023, it was announced that Ximena García Lecuona would make her directorial debut with No me sigas which she would co-direct with Eduardo Lecuona. The film was shot in secret in Mexico City, Mexico.

== Release ==
No me sigas premiered at the Morelia International Film Festival on October 14, 2025, and was released in Mexico on October 30, 2025, by Cinépolis Distribución. The film was released in the United States on January 1, 2026, by Hulu.
