= Craig Price (murderer) =

American serial killer (born 1973)

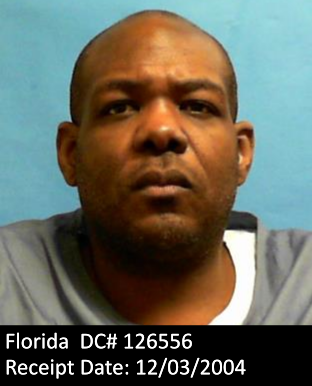
- Born: Craig Chandler Price; October 11, 1973 (age 53); Warwick, Rhode Island, U.S.
- Status: Incarcerated
- Convictions: Rhode Island; Murder (4 counts); Contempt of court (2 counts); Escape; Aggravated assault on law enforcement officer Assault by prisoner (2 counts); Florida; Introducing weapon Resisting officer Battery by detainee Battery on law enforcement officer Attempted murder
- Penalty: 25 years (Note: for the attempted murder case in Florida, this was the longest sentence he had ever received for his crimes.)

Details
- Victims: 4
- Span of crimes: July 27, 1987 – September 1, 1989
- Country: United States
- State: Rhode Island
- Date apprehended: September 5, 1989
- Imprisoned at: Union Correctional Institution, Raiford, Florida

Craig Chandler Price (born October 11, 1973) is an American mass murderer who committed his crimes in Warwick, Rhode Island between the ages of 13 and 15. He was arrested in 1989 for four murders committed in his neighborhood: a woman and her two daughters that year, and the murder of another woman two years earlier. He had an existing criminal record for petty theft.

Price calmly confessed to his crimes after he was discovered. He was arrested a month before his 16th birthday and was tried and convicted as a minor. By law, this meant that he would be released and his criminal records sealed when he turned 21, and Price bragged that he would "make history" when he was released.

The case led to changes in state law to allow juveniles to be tried as adults for serious crimes, but these could not be applied retroactively to Price. Rhode Island residents formed the group Citizens Opposed to the Release of Craig Price to lobby for his continued imprisonment, due to the brutality of his crimes and the opinion of state psychologists that he was a poor candidate for rehabilitation. However, Price was not released due to a series of crimes he committed behind bars while he was held in the Rhode Island Training School.

During his incarceration, Price has been charged with additional crimes, including criminal contempt for refusing a psychological evaluation, extortion for threatening a corrections officer, assault, and violation of probation for fights while in prison. He was sentenced to an additional 10–25 years, depending on his cooperation with treatment.

== Details of the murders ==
Price committed his first murder at the age of 13 in Warwick, Rhode Island on the night of July 27, 1987, Price broke into a home that was only two houses away from his own, took a knife from the kitchen, and stabbed 27-year-old Rebecca Spencer 58 times, killing her.

A little over two years later, Price was a 15-year-old freshman in high school when he murdered three other neighbors on September 1, 1989. Price, high on marijuana and LSD, stabbed 39-year-old Joan Heaton 57 times, her 10-year-old daughter Jennifer, who witnessed Price stabbing her mother to death in the kitchen, 62 times, and crushed the skull of Heaton's 7-year-old daughter Melissa who also witnessed Price stabbing her mother and sister, and inflicted 30 stab wounds. The stabbings were so brutal that the handles broke off the knives he used, with the blades staying inside the bodies of the victims, including a knife blade lodged inside of the neck of the 10-year-old girl, Jennifer.

At the time, the brutality of the murders was mostly unknown due to Price's sealed records. According to law-enforcement officials, Price had no remorse when confessing to the crimes, and as for the motive, Price himself claimed racism by white people beginning when he was a young child was a factor and that the first time he wanted someone to die was when a group of white adults allegedly shouted racial slurs at him and tried to run him over with their car when he was a young boy.

== Prison violence ==
An officer from the Rhode Island Department of Corrections said Price has been booked twice for fighting since leaving the Adult Correctional Institutions in Cranston. Price was denied parole in March 2009 and his release date was set for May 2020. In 2004, he was transferred from Rhode Island to Florida to serve his time due to his violent tendencies.

In Florida on July 29, 2009, Craig was involved in a prison fight with another inmate. While trying to break up the fight, one of the correctional officers was stabbed in the finger by a handmade shiv in Price's possession. In the wake of the prison fight, Price was transferred to another facility.

On April 4, 2017, Price was accused of stabbing fellow inmate Joshua Davis at the Suwannee Correctional Institution in Live Oak, Florida with a 5-inch homemade knife. On January 18, 2019, he was sentenced to 25 years for the crime.

== See also ==
- List of serial killers in the United States
