= Edgar Cantero =

Spanish writer and cartoonist

- Born: 27 May 1981 (age 45); Barcelona
- Occupations: Writer, cartoonist
- Notable work: Dormir amb Winona Ryder, The Supernatural Enhancements, Meddling Kids
- Website: punkahoy.blogspot.com

Edgar Cantero (born 27 May 1981 in Barcelona) is a Spanish writer and cartoonist working in Catalan, Spanish, and English. He is best known in Catalonia for his 2017 award-winning debut novel Dormir amb Winona Ryder, as well as his detective novel series starring "el Cegador de Verri." Abroad, he is better known for the New York Times best-selling horror-comedy novel Meddling Kids (2017).

== Life ==
Cantero was born in Barcelona in 1981. At 18 he started entering writing competitions in Catalan, winning numerous awards for his short stories and novellas. His debut novel, Dormir amb Winona Ryder (2007) won the Ciutat de Badalona and the Joan Crexells awards. That year he also began contributing to the satirical magazine El Jueves as a writer and cartoonist.

After a second novel in Catalan, Vallvi (after the neighborhood of Vallvidrera in Barcelona), Cantero tried his luck in English. In the following years he released three novels with American publisher Doubleday. Despite his novel Meddling Kids becoming a best-seller, his work in English remains largely unknown in his country. Since 2019 he lives in Los Angeles.

Cantero also works as a translator for the Spanish-language webcomic Rich Girl From Barcelona, written and drawn by Guille Martínez-Vela. Cantero was chosen due to his long friendship and working relationship with Martínez-Vela, which the author states results in a superior translation of his humor and intent.

In 2024 he returned to his native language with his sixth novel, Ràdio Free Camaco. It was the first entry in a detective series starring "el Cegador de Verri" (lit. "the Blinder from Verri"), a homeless ex-convict reluctantly turned sleuth. A second entry, Gangsta Major, followed in 2025.

== Bibliography ==
=== Novels ===
==== Catalan ====
- Dormir amb Winona Ryder ("Sleeping with Winona Ryder" – 2007)
- Vallvi (2011)
- Ràdio Free Camaco (2024)
- Gangsta Major (2025)

==== English ====
- The Supernatural Enhancements (2014)
- Meddling Kids (2017)
- This Body's Not Big Enough for Both of Us (2018)

=== Novellas ===
==== Catalan ====
- Baileys n'coke (2008)
- Dies delenda (2008)

=== Short stories ===
==== Catalan ====
- "El nexe entre el sexe i el plexe venós dorsal" (2005)
- "L'urinari d'Hesíode" (2005). English translation, "Aesop's Urinal", published in Best European Fiction 2016, 2015.
- "20/XX" (2006)
- "Tres nadons" (2007)
- "Un cadàver bonic" (2013)

==== English ====
- "There's a Giant Trapdoor Spider Under Your Bed" (2018)
- "The Meddler" (2018), a spin-off set in the aftermath of Meddling Kids.
- "Goin' Down" (2022)

=== Translation work ===
- Rich Girl From Barcelona (Spanish: Niña pija, lit. 'Posh girl'), webcomic, translator for author/artist Guille Martínez-Vela
