= The Oval Office Tapes =

Scripted podcast

The Oval Office Tapes is a scripted podcast that imagines what the conversations in the White House might sound like. The show was created by documentary filmmaker R.J. Cutler. The executive producers are R.J. Cutler, Scott Conroy, and Jason Blum. The producer is Trevor Smith. The writers are R.J. Cutler, Scott Conroy, Lesley Hollingsworth, and Mike Schneider. The podcast is a production of Blumhouse Productions, Cadence13, and Cutler Productions. The show premiered in 2018, and made its live-taping debut at Politicon 2018.

R.J. Cutler describes coming up with the idea for the podcast: "I'm not alone, I think, these days in being fairly obsessed with what's going on in Washington D.C., what's happening at 1600 Pennsylvania Ave., and it occurred to me that if we could hear what was going on within the rooms there, the private rooms, it'd be very interesting, and that's what The Oval Office Tapes is."

== Format ==
In an interview with Hollywood Reporter, R.J. Cutler described the production of the podcast, "We write every Monday, Tuesday, Wednesday, we record on Thursday, and we drop on Friday." Each episode contains segments telling the story behind the week's news. Instead of reading copy directly from the advertisers, The Oval Office Tapes employs the Ghost of Abraham Lincoln, Totally Real Paid Protestors, and the Backbone of the Republican Party to read the advertisements.

== Critical response ==
The show premiered to positive critical response, with praise from celebrities such as Alec Baldwin and James Carville. The Hollywood Reporter called it, "comedic gold." In April 2019, it gained a nomination for the Webby Awards for Best Comedy Podcast.

== Episodes ==
Episode Number	Episode Name	Episode Description
101	Kim Kardashian & October Surprise	President Donald Trump calls Kim Kardashian to discuss a new publicity strategy, conspires with Attorney General Jeff Sessions, and takes Paul Ryan to task for not following through on a particularly interesting promise.
102	Stormy Weather & Melania calls Michelle	After the release of Stormy Daniels’s tell-all, President Donald Trump finds himself in the middle of a White House divided. While Melania calls former First Lady Michelle Obama to ask for advice, President Donald Trump gives advice of his own to Newt Gingrich, and phones former top advisor Steve Bannon for some advice of his own.
103	Kavanaugh's Yearbook & Dealing with Ronan	During the nomination of Supreme Court Justice Brett Kavanaugh, President Donald Trump gives the nominee some guidance going into his hearings, gives his candid thoughts on Senator Ted Cruz, and confers with Ronan Farrow about the tarnished reputations of men accused of sexual assault.
104	Kanye, #hetoo & the Ghost of John McCain	In another week of the totally normal Trump presidency, Kanye West calls to inquire about a possible job opening, Donald Trump Jr. plants the seed for a groundbreaking #hetoo movement, and Lindsey Graham is visited by an old friend inquiring about the whereabouts of his backbone.
105	Repealing the 19th Amendment - Ivanka 2020 - The End of the World As We Know It	In an effort to secure his presidency, President Donald Trump asks Vice President Mike Pence if women really need the right to vote, Kim Jong Un and Donald Trump call to discuss the Leader's massive dictatorship, and Ivanka Trump plans her move for 2020.
106	Educating Pocahontas, Melania's New Contract & Saudi Infowars	President Donald Trump takes on Senator Elizabeth Warren, his son Donald Trump Jr., and directs Rudy Giuliani to re-negotiate a pre-existing deal with Melania Trump.
107	Make America's Greatest Hits Again	Judge Jeanine Pirro guides the listeners through some of the best segments from the Oval Office, featuring characters such as Newt Gingrich, Ivanka Trump, and President Donald Trump.
108	Tape From The Future and The Ghost of Roy Cohn	Roy Cohn comes back from hell to impart some wisdom to Donald Trump, the finale of the President's reality-competition show, A Heartbeat Away comes to a shocking finale, and a tape from the future shows what could happen if Donald Trump gets his Red Wave.
109	Donald Trump is Part Mexican and Jim Acosta is Here to Prove It!	After President Donald Trump banned him from the White House, CNN journalist, Jim Acosta, has found a new job as the host of The Oval Office Tapes. Trump forces his cabinet to take an ancestry test and is shocked by his own results, the "war" with the refugees seeking asylum escalates, and Robert Mueller tries to call the President in the wake of the firing of former Attorney General Jeff Sessions, but ends up getting the wrong voice at the other end of the phone.
110	Victim of the Year! Season One Finale!	In the season finale of The Oval Office Tapes President Donald Trump starts his day by watching the finale of the new Fox News show, Victim of the Year, where Sean Hannity and Jeanine Pirro interview the biggest victims of 2018, include victims of gun violence, family separation, and white Republicans. President Trump makes plans for another Roast of Donald Trump, and journalist Maggie Haberman speaks, once again, with John Barron.

== Cast ==
- Mary Birdsong
- Nicole Collins
- Ian James Corlett
- Chris Cox
- Quinton Flynn
- Melvin Jackson Jr.
- David Kaye
- Bruce Locke
- Brendan McKay
- Scott McCord
- Danielle Morrow
- Jeff Rector
- Jonathan Von Mering
- Phillip Wilburn
