= Worst Neighbor Ever =

True crime television series

- Genre: Docuseries
- Directed by: Cynthia Childs
- No. of seasons: 1
- No. of episodes: 4

Production
- Executive producers: Jason Blum; Cynthia Childs; Jordana Hochman; Gretchen Palek
- Running time: 52–61 min
- Production companies: ITV America; Blumhouse Television

Original release
- Network: Netflix
- Release: July 1, 2026 – present

Related
- Worst Roommate Ever; Worst Ex Ever

Worst Neighbor Ever is an American true crime docuseries on Netflix. The series serves as a spin-off of Worst Roommate Ever and Worst Ex Ever. In October 2026, Netflix renewed the series for a second season.

== Episodes ==
Series overview
Season	Episodes	Originally released
1	4	July 1, 2026

=== Season 1 (2026) ===
No.	Title	Directed by	Original release date	Running time
1	"She Finally Snapped"	Cynthia Childs	July 1, 2026	56 min
Frances goes from Shawna and Dave's houseguest to a paranoid neighbor obsessed with grievances — and intent on escalating her one-sided feud.
2	"Midwest Meltdown"	Cynthia Childs	July 1, 2026	55 min
In 2012, after a quiet Indiana suburb is rocked by a massive explosion, investigators begin to question the motives of neighbor Moncy and her new boyfriend Mark.
3	"Fear Thy Neighbor"	Cynthia Childs	July 1, 2026	52 min
Miles and Melina thought they'd found their dream home, but a nightmare unfolds when evicted neighbor Jamal launches a relentless harassment campaign.
4	"The Executor"	Cynthia Childs	July 1, 2026	61 min
When Charles' neighbors report him missing, suspicion falls on Caroline, who claims to be managing his estate — but is instead concealing a grisly crime.

== Release ==
Worst Neighbor Ever premiered on July 1, 2026, on Netflix, with all four episodes released at once.

== Reception ==
On the review aggregator website Rotten Tomatoes, the series holds an approval rating of 86% based on 7 reviews.
