= Blumhouse Games =

American video game publisher

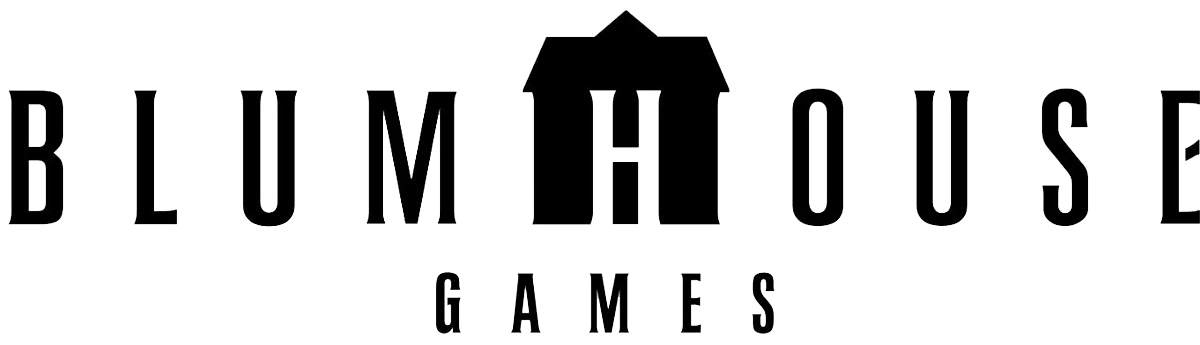
- Logo used since 2023
- Type: Subsidiary
- Industry: Video games
- Founded: February 2023; 3 years ago
- Founder: Jason Blum
- Headquarters: Los Angeles, California, U.S.
- Parent: Blumhouse Productions
- Website: blumhouse.com/games

Blumhouse Games is an American video game publisher headquartered in Los Angeles, California. Founded in February 2023 by Jason Blum, Blumhouse Games is a video game production subsidiary of Blumhouse Productions that creates horror titles.

== History ==
Blumhouse Games was founded in February 2023 by Jason Blum to produce horror-themed games for console, PC, and mobile platforms, marking the company's entry into the video game industry. The gaming division focuses on indie budget projects with production costs below $10 million.

In November 2023, Blumhouse Games hired Jo Lammert as the production lead and Clint Brewer as the technical director. Jason Blum stated that the company's strategy is to replicate its film approach in the gaming sector: seeking out original, low-budget ideas that can be turned into successful games.

Blumhouse Games showcased six horror-themed video games at the Summer Games Fest on June 7, 2024. Featured titles include: Fear the Spotlight by Cozy Game Pals in 2024; Sleep Awake, a first-person psychedelic horror game set in the distant future, developed by Eyes Out and designed by Cory Davis and Robin Finck; Crisol: Theater of Idols, developed by Vermila Studios, is a first-person horror adventure game; Grave Seasons from developer Perfect Garbage; The Simulation by Playmestudio; and Project C by Half Mermaid Productions, designed by Sam Barlow and Brandon Cronenberg, was also showcased.

== Games published ==
Year	Title	Developer	Platforms	Ref.
2024	Fear the Spotlight	Cozy Game Pals	PlayStation 4, PlayStation 5, Windows, Nintendo Switch, Xbox One, Xbox Series X/S	
2025	Eyes of Hellfire	Gambrinous	Windows	
2025	Sleep Awake	Eyes Out	Windows, PlayStation 5, Xbox Series X/S	
2026	Crisol: Theater of Idols	Vermila Studios	Windows, PlayStation 5, Xbox Series X/S	
2027	Grave Seasons	Perfect Garbage	Windows, PlayStation 5, Nintendo Switch, Xbox Series X/S	
