= Meddling Kids =

Book by Edgar Cantero

- Author: Edgar Cantero
- Cover artist: Michael Windsor
- Genre: Horror; Mystery; Comedy
- Published: July 12, 2017 (Doubleday)
- Publication place: United States
- Media type: Print (hardcover, paperback)
- Pages: 336
- ISBN: 978-0-385-54199-2
- Preceded by: The Supernatural Enhancements
- Followed by: This Body's Not Big Enough for Both of Us

Meddling Kids is a 2017 horror-comedy novel by Catalan author Edgar Cantero, published by Doubleday and Blumhouse Books. It deals with a former gang of children detectives, in the vein of Enid Blyton's Famous Five or Scooby-Doo, who reunite in their mid-twenties to reopen a case that traumatized them as kids and expose a plot of Lovecraftian horror. A spin-off, This Body's Not Big Enough for Both of Us, was published in 2018, along with a spin-off short story, "The Meddler", that same year.

== Plot synopsis ==
The novel opens with a newspaper clip from 1977 featuring the "Blyton Summer Detective Club", a bunch of young investigators aged 11–13, who solved the mystery of an alleged monster haunting the area of Sleepy Lake in Oregon. Thirteen years after solving that last case, the former detectives have drifted apart and lead broken lives, haunted by the memories of the night they spent in the mansion on the lake: budding genius Kerri is an alcoholic tormented by nightmares and has been unable to finish her schooling; nerd Nate is regularly checking himself into mental institutions; tomboy Andy is a vagrant wanted in several states and dealing with aggressive behavior; and golden boy Peter went on to become a successful Hollywood actor whose career was cut short by suicide. Andy has traced all of their problems back to that last case, believing that there was more to it than just a guy in a costume. When the man they exposed as the Sleepy Lake monster makes parole, she assaults him only to confirm that there was something more to the case. Andy then sets off to reunite the surviving members of the gang (including Tim, a Weimaraner descended from the original canine member of the team and Peter as a hallucination that only Nate can see and hear), and together they return to the town of Blyton Hills to solve the case for good.

== Background ==
Cantero first pitched the idea to his editors at Doubleday in 2014 as "Enid Blyton meets Lovecraft". When they did not recognize Blyton's name, he changed that reference to the Scooby Gang. Although the members of the Blyton Summer Detective Club are based in stereotypes present in many children detective series (the team composition of two boys, two girls, and a dog fits both Blyton's The Famous Five series and Scooby-Doo, Where Are You?), the protagonist, Andy Rodriguez, a butch Latina lesbian, was still modeled after George, the tomboy from the Famous Five. Nancy Drew, Trixie Belden, and the Hardy Boys are also referenced in different ways.

The novel also borrows heavily from the Cthulhu Mythos, the fictional universe established by authors publishing their stories in the magazine Weird Tales, and in particular from H. P. Lovecraft's novella The Case of Charles Dexter Ward. The fictional city of Arkham, Miskatonic University, and the Necronomicon are featured.

The title references a catchphrase from the Scooby-Doo series. At the climax, when the heroes have caught the villain and exposed his plot, the villain would often say "And I'd have gotten away with it, too, if it weren't for those meddling kids!"

== Tie-in ==
A scene set in a psychiatric hospital features a brief appearance by A. Z. Kimrean, the lead in Cantero's following novel, This Body's Not Big Enough for Both of Us. The latter novel was already written, but unpublished, in Spanish while Cantero was writing Meddling Kids. A bonus scene at the end of the paperback edition shows Kimrean arriving in San Francisco, where This Body's Not Big Enough for Both of Us takes place.

== Reception ==
Meddling Kids received mostly positive reviews, with critics drawing comparisons with Buffy the Vampire Slayer and "1980s-centric projects" like Stranger Things or Stephen King's It.

Jason Sheehan from NPR qualified it as "a brilliant idea wedded to beautiful and perfectly-pitched execution." Brian Truitt of USA Today gave it 3.5 out of 4 stars and called it "as cleverly witty as its title...filled with high jinks both terrorizing and hilarious." Sam Reader in their review for Barnes & Noble's Sci-fi and Fantasy Blog praised the depth of the story, saying that the novel "isn't really about the mystery (though it's a good one), but the characters investigating it...These characters may be running through a plot that sounds like a parody, but they are anything but caricatures. When they finally do get closure, it means almost as much (if not more) than solving the mystery."

Some stylistic choices divided critics: While Publishers Weekly praised the prose as "fast and funny" and NPR said that the language tricks "would be maddening if they weren't so much fun", Christian Bone of Starburst thought that "Cantero's chosen prose style may prove contentious" and that "some might think it suits the playful tone of the story, but it can also be distracting and take you out of the narrative." James Floyd Kelly of Geek Dad warned that the novel was "not for kids: definitely rated R for language, sexual situations, and horror/violence."

The book appeared on The New York Times Best Seller list on its third week after release. It was nominated for a Goodreads Choice Award for Best Horror, and it was listed by Book riot as one of the best queer books of 2017 for its lesbian romance subplot.

== Spin-offs ==
A spin-off detective novel, This Body's Not Big Enough for Both of Us, about the minor Meddling Kids character A.Z. Kimrean, was published in 2018. Additionally, short story titled "The Meddler" was published on the Penguin Random House website on Halloween. It is part of the Spooky Short Stories collection and downloadable for free. Set in the aftermath of the main events in the novel, it follows an aspiring reporter questioning the official version of the incidents that took place in Blyton Hills. Several supporting characters from Meddling Kids appear, but none of the leads.

== See also ==
- Lost Mysteries
