= Youssef Khater =

Danish fraudster

- Born: Youssef Khater; March 19, 1978 (age 48); Lebanon
- Other names: Joseph Carter; Josef Maria; August Eriksen
- Criminal charges: Attempted murder; Arson; Embezzlement; Fraud

Details
- Victims: Dominic Rayner; Callie Quinn; Carlos Medina; Maher Khatib

Youssef Khater, who was featured on Season 1 Episode 3 of Netflix's Worst Roommate Ever series, is a Danish fraudster who was convicted of attempted murder in Chile and fraud in Denmark. He previously served for 10 years in the Royal Danish Navy. Khater was dishonorably discharged at the age of 28 for fraud.

== Criminal history ==
Khater was arrested in Denmark in 2009 for fraud, arson, embezzlement, and forgery but did not appear for his January 2011 trial. In 2012, he was convicted of attempted murder of a Texas woman in Chile, and sentenced to 600 days.

Khater portrayed himself as an "extreme marathon runner" who befriended sportspeople as part of his cons. After serving time in Denmark, he ran a marathon in Costa Rica in 2015 and thus began his marathon con. In 2017, he was arrested for fraud, but released in Puerto Viejo de Talamanca.
