= Deep Cuts (film) =

Upcoming American film by Sean Durkin

- Directed by: Sean Durkin
- Screenplay by: Sean Durkin
- Based on: Deep Cuts by Holly Brickley
- Produced by: Ronald Bronstein; Eli Bush; Sean Durkin; Anthony Katagas; Josh Safdie; Jordan Tappis
- Starring: Cailee Spaeny; Drew Starkey; Ariela Barer; Abubakr Ali; Quintessa Swindell; Jennifer Jason Leigh; Gaby Hoffmann
- Cinematography: Mátyás Erdély
- Production company: Central Pictures
- Distributed by: A24
- Country: United States
- Language: English

Deep Cuts is an upcoming American romantic drama film written and directed by Sean Durkin, adapted from the novel by Holly Brickley.

== Cast ==
- Cailee Spaeny as Eileen "Percy" Marks
- Drew Starkey as Joe Morrow
- Ariela Barer as Zoe Gutierrez
- Abubakr Ali as Neil
- Quintessa Swindell
- Jennifer Jason Leigh
- Gaby Hoffmann

== Production ==
It was announced in February 2025 that Sean Durkin had been set to write and direct the film, with Saoirse Ronan and Austin Butler cast to star. Ronan would also serve as a producer. By December, Ronan and Butler had left the project due to scheduling conflicts, with Cailee Spaeny and Drew Starkey cast to replace them. Musician Blake Mills was also brought on to create music for the film.

In January 2026, Odessa A'zion joined the cast. A'zion exited the film three days later after social media users noted that her character was half-Mexican in Brickley's novel; A'zion claimed that she was unaware of this when accepting the role. Numerous Latin American actors signed an open letter in response to the controversy, condemning the continued practice of whitewashing Latina characters in film. Writer Gloria Calderón Kellett, also a signatory to the open letter, wrote a column on Deadline Hollywood reflecting on the situation as part of a boarder issue around Latino representation in media. Ariela Barer, who is of both Mexican and Jewish heritage, would be cast in the role the following month.

In March, Abubakr Ali, Quintessa Swindell, Jennifer Jason Leigh and Gaby Hoffmann were added to the cast.

Principal production was underway by March 2026, with some filming occurring at Amoeba Music in San Francisco, California.
