= Frederick Pete Cox =

American serial killer

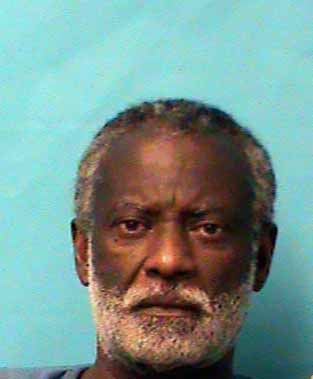
- Inmate mugshot
- Born: August 27, 1953 (age 73); Tallahassee, Florida, U.S.
- Convictions: First degree murder x3 Attempted murder x2
- Penalty: Life imprisonment (Murder); 30 years imprisonment (Attempted murder)

Details
- Victims: 3
- Span of crimes: March – April 1997
- Country: United States
- State: Florida
- Date apprehended: May 21, 1997
- Imprisoned at: Suwannee Correctional Institution, Live Oak, Florida

Frederick Pete Cox (born August 27, 1953) is an American serial killer. Formerly a telemarketer, in the span of a few months in 1997, he attacked five women in Orlando, Florida, killing three. After an initial mistrial, Cox was found guilty at his second trial and sentenced to life imprisonment, plus 30 years for attempted murder.

== Early life ==
Born in the state capital of Tallahassee, Cox moved to Orlando at an early age, graduating from Jones High School in 1972, after which he enlisted in the United States Army. He served for three years in West Germany, before receiving an honorable discharge and returning to Orlando. He then served about 20 years in the United States Army Reserve's 143rd Transportation Command. In the following years, he worked a number of jobs. He was an Orange County correctional officer for a few months in 1978, but was fired for falling asleep at work. Some years prior to his crime spree, he moved into a modest concrete house in Pine Hills, where he lived with his common law wife, two sons and two German Shepherds.

Described by his neighbors as an unfriendly and rather quiet person, Cox was seen as a nice old man by family and relatives, who enjoyed talking to younger people and tinkering with his ham radio at home. Due to a back injury he sustained in 1996, he was discharged from the army reserve and had to walk using a cane, but still managed to earn a living from his job as a telemarketer.

== Crimes ==
=== Minor offenses ===
In 1988, Cox was arrested for the first time at an adult book store named "Red Garter", after police found him masturbating on the premises. Charged with indecent exposure, he was to be put up for pre-trial diversion (since it was his first offense). However, before that could happen, in 1990, he was arrested yet again for possession of marijuana outside a Publix store parking lot. He pleaded no contest to the charges, and agreed to community service, additionally volunteering for "Mothers Against Crack Cocaine", an organization aimed at helping drug addicts recover. According to Mae Steger, the group's leader, Cox was an active and helpful participant.

=== 1997 crime spree ===
Cox's modus operandi involved driving around Orlando in his tan Buick Park Avenue and picking up women he thought to be prostitutes, shooting them afterwards. The first to be attacked was 34-year-old Tracey Adams, who, unlike the victims that followed, had no connection to the sex industry. On March 12, she stopped at Pappy Kennedy and Florence Streets at around midnight, wanting to fix her flat tire. In that moment, she was approached by Cox, whom incorrectly assumed that she was a prostitute, and asked her for sex. When Adams refused, he shot her in the right arm and sped off. Although she now has trouble moving her arm, Adams survived the attack without any greater injuries.

He struck again on March 20, shooting dead execution-style 40-year-old prostitute Patricia Ann Logan, later dumping her naked body in a field near West Colonial Drive. Logan's body was found five days later by a hiker walking along a trail south from the highway along the shore of Lake Sherwood.

On April 16, Cox approached 28-year-old Yolanda Neals, who was standing at Church Street and Tampa Avenue. He offered her $25 for sex, to which she agreed. Cox then drove Neals to a secluded area on Lively Street and Wallace Road, near Universal Studios, parked the car and told her to get out so they could have sex. When she did, he opened fire, shooting Neals in the face, with the bullet exiting through her cheek. Frightened, she fled while Cox continued to fire at her, succeeding in escaping, surviving her injuries, which left her with a lisp.

On April 29, the killer struck for a final time, killing two more women within 24 hours of one another: 26-year-old Stephanie Singleton and 22-year-old Mary Ann Voepel. Both were transient, drug-addicted prostitutes who met each other in the Orange County Jail, and smoked crack cocaine at an abandoned house in Orlando. Their bodies were later found by a transient in the woods off the Americana Boulevard near Shingle Creek, close to the Interstate 4. A few days later, they were positively identified as Singleton and Voepel. Authorities investigated a possible connection to two other murders that had occurred in the area, but determined that those killings were unrelated.

== Arrest, trial and imprisonment ==
The surviving victims, Adams and Neals, agreed to assist the detectives in their hunt for the serial killer. Neals helped develop an identikit and identified the car, while Adams confirmed the composite sketch, that she had seen her attacker and his car's license plate. With those clues, Cox was arrested on May 21, 1997, on attempted murder charges, much to the shock of his family and relatives, and held without bail. Police thereafter searched his house and car, finding a 9mm pistol and blood on the carpet of his tan Buick.

According to psychologist Greg Coram, of the Monmouth University in West Long Branch, New Jersey, Cox's case bore similarities to the killings of Andrew Cunanan, who operated in an almost parallel timeframe, with his final murder, that of fashion designer Gianni Versace, taking place in Florida as well. On July 23, Cox was indicted for the murders of Stephanie Singleton and Mary Ann Voepel. His first trial in February 2001 resulted in a hung jury, as the 12th member refused to accept Cox's guilt and was certain that there was insufficient evidence to his guilt. After an intensive debate, which resulted in some jurors begging and pleading for a conviction, a new trial for Cox was ordered at a later date.

At the new trial in April 2001, Cox stood expressionless while the judge pronounced the guilty verdicts, which could have resulted in him receiving the death penalty. His defense attorney, Mark O'Mara, contended that his client "snapped" on the moment and likely suffered from some sort of mental illness, asking that he be convicted of second-degree murder instead, which is not punishable by death. After a two-year delay, and a request by a victim's family member to finally end the case, prosecutors agreed to drop the death penalty, and Justice Frank Kaney instead sentenced Cox to three counts of life imprisonment.

== See also ==
- List of serial killers in the United States
