= Worst Ex Ever =

True crime television series

- Genre: Docuseries
- Directed by: Cynthia Childs
- No. of seasons: 2
- No. of episodes: 8

Production
- Executive producers: Jason Blum; Cynthia Childs; Jordana Hochman; Chris McCumber; Gretchen Palek
- Running time: 51–63 min
- Production companies: ITV America; Blumhouse Television

Original release
- Network: Netflix
- Release: August 28, 2024 – present

Related
- Worst Roommate Ever; Worst Neighbor Ever

Worst Ex Ever is an American true crime docuseries on Netflix. The series serves as a spin-off of Worst Roommate Ever. In April 2026, Netflix renewed the series for a second season which premiered on May 6, 2026.

== Episodes ==
Series overview
Season	Episodes	Originally released
1	4	August 28, 2024
2	4	May 6, 2026

=== Season 1 (2024) ===
No. overall	No. in season	Title	Directed by	Original release date	Running time
1	1	"Dating the Devil"	Cynthia Childs	August 28, 2024	63 min
Justine Siemens alarming call to a friend in Grants Pass, Oregon leads to a statewide police hunt for her recent partner with a monstrous domestic abuse history.
2	2	"Betrayed by the Badge"	Cynthia Childs	August 28, 2024	60 min
Upon discovering that her boyfriend Jerry Ramrattan had misled her about his identity, Seemona Sumasar ends their relationship. However, he unleashes a relentless campaign of harassment against her in Queens.
3	3	"Killing for Custody"	Cynthia Childs	August 28, 2024	51 min
In Dublin, California, a protracted custody battle makes Eric Hill's wife and her mother orchestrate a vindictive scheme against him, which also ends up entangling Eric's grandmother.
4	4	"Married to a Monster"	Cynthia Childs	August 28, 2024	54 min
Amanda Canales idyllic romance falls apart as marriage reveals his domineering tendencies. Following their divorce, a sinister murder plot comes to light that shocks the community of Everett, Washington.

=== Season 2 (2026) ===
No. overall	No. in season	Title	Directed by	Original release date	Running time
5	1	"Dating the Deadpool Killer"	Cynthia Childs	May 6, 2026	78 min
Kelly Matthews thought that Wade Wilson was "the perfect man". But his erratic behavior escalated into a horrifying rampage.
6	2	"Primetime Predator"	Cynthia Childs	May 6, 2026	53 min
Before a stint on "90 Day Fiancé," Geoffrey Paschel hid a dark past. Kristen Chapman suffered brutal mistreatment at his hands in Knoxville, Tennessee.
7	3	"A Fatal Attraction"	Cynthia Childs	May 6, 2026	56 min
When Katie Long first met Joyce Pelzer in Largo, Florida, she didn’t realize her violent control issues. Soon, she confessed to her a cold case from Lithonia, Georgia.
8	4	"Ride or Die"	Cynthia Childs	May 6, 2026	52 min
In Daytona Beach, Florida, Karen Kummerer filed a restraining order against her abusive partner Scott Freeman. However, he kidnapped her at knifepoint for a petrifying road trip.

== See Also ==
- Jerry Ramrattan
