= Abubakr Ali =

Egyptian-born American actor

Ali in 2026

Abubakr Ali is an Egyptian-born American actor. On television, he played Officer Samir Bashir in Law & Order: Organized Crime. He also played the lead in the 2022 film Anything's Possible.

Ali was born in Egypt and raised in Pasadena, California. He is Muslim. According to an interview he did for Wonderland, Ali and his family moved to the United States in 2000; his father died in 2017.

== Filmography ==
=== Film ===
Year	Title	Role	Notes
2013	Someday Soon	Dancer	Short film
2014	Doradus	Demitri Christon	Short film
2018	Irish Goodbye	Nizar	Short film
2022	Anything's Possible	Khal	
2025	A House of Dynamite	Lieutenant Dan Buck	
2026	Your Mother Your Mother Your Mother	Hatty	
TBA	Deep Cuts		Post-production

=== Television ===
Year	Title	Role	Notes
2015	Dig	Goat herder	1 episode
2020	Tommy	Gamal Hadiri	1 episode
2020	Katy Keene	Raj Patel	6 episodes
2020	Little Voice	Dr. Nadeen	1 episode
2021	The Walking Dead: World Beyond	Dev	3 episodes
2021	Our Ladies of Brooklyn	Rahim	1 episode
2020–2023	Power Book II: Ghost	Sebastian 'Bash' Kamal-Stern	4 episodes
2022	Grendel	Hunter Rose/Grendel	Unreleased
2024	Law & Order: Organized Crime	Officer Samir Bashir	5 episodes
2024	This Really Happened	Boy	TV movie
