= Anything's Possible (film) =

- Official release poster
- Directed by: Billy Porter
- Written by: Ximena García Lecuona
- Produced by: Christine Vachon; David Hinojosa; Andrew Lauren; D.J. Gugenheim
- Starring: Eva Reign; Abubakr Ali; Renée Elise Goldsberry
- Cinematography: Andrei Bowden Schwartz
- Edited by: Hanna Park
- Music by: Leo Birenberg
- Production companies: Orion Pictures; Andrew Lauren Productions; Killer Films
- Distributed by: Amazon Studios; United Artists Releasing
- Release date: July 22, 2022
- Running time: 98 minutes
- Country: United States
- Language: English
- Budget: $10 million

Anything's Possible is a 2022 American coming-of-age romantic comedy film directed by Billy Porter and written by Ximena García Lecuona.

The film was released on July 22, 2022, on Prime Video.

== Plot ==
Kelsa is a transgender high school student in her senior year. She spends time with her best friends, Chris and Em, and makes YouTube videos about her life as a trans high schooler that she keeps a secret from her mother.

Her classmate Khal spends time giving thoughtful relationship advice to strangers on Reddit and hanging out with his best friend Otis. He struggles with telling his parents that he wants to learn a trade rather than go to a four-year college.

Khal and Kelsa begin to develop a mutual attraction in their art class when they are partnered together to paint portraits. Kelsa's friend Em admits that she has a crush on Khal and has Kelsa pass him a flirtatious note at lunch. When Kelsa DMs Khal on Instagram to clarify the note was from Em, they begin talking frequently and become closer. Khal wants to admit his feelings for Kelsa but worries about the social stigma of dating a trans girl, especially from Otis who frequently makes offhand homophobic and transphobic jokes.

On his brothers advice, Khal decides to bring flowers to Kelsa at school but panics when Otis asks who they are for and blurts out Em. Chris overhears and tells Em and word quickly spreads. After a panicked call to his brother, Khal decides to act on his feelings and gives the flowers to Kelsa at lunch. Em leaves in embarrassment. The next day he talks to Kelsa alone in an elevator and she confirms that she also has feelings for him. They decide to go for it despite the risk of losing their friends and leave the elevator holding hands in front of all their classmates. Khal stops spending time with Otis after he repeatedly asks Khal if he is gay, and Em breaks off her friendship with Kelsa entirely, trying unsuccessfully to convince Chris to do the same.

Khal and Kelsa go to a botanical garden on their first date and share their first kiss outside of her house after he walks her home. Kelsa has a confrontation with Em in the locker room when she overhears Em spreading false rumors about Chris, which ends with Em falling and breaking her finger. Soon after, Khal meets Kelsa's mother and makes out with Kelsa after she leaves them in the house alone, but they are interrupted by Chris. Kelsa is nervous and unsure about the physical aspect of their relationship but Khal assures her that he is attracted to all of her and that he finds her beautiful. They leave with Chris and go to a party.

At the party Em confronts Kelsa again and tells her that Khal is only dating her to seem woke. She gets upset when he tries to comfort her and says that she can take care of herself and she is tired of everyone trying to protect her, and that she's tired of her transness being brought up in every aspect of her life. Meanwhile, Otis and Em plan to fabricate a story that Kelsa attacked Em in the locker room in an attempt to break up Kelsa and Khal. This results in Kelsa being banned from the women's locker rooms and bathrooms.

Khal shares a link to one of Kelsa's YouTube videos on Reddit and it goes viral, resulting in her mom finding the channel and forcing her to take it down out of concerns for her safety. Chris rallies the students to protest Kelsa's ban from the women's room by refusing to use the restroom for their assigned gender and chanting in the cafeteria. Kelsa is embarrassed and angered by this and angrily confronts Khal for sharing her video and making it go viral. Otis blocks him when he attempts to go after her, and he eventually breaks down and punches Otis after he repeatedly misgenders and insults Kelsa. When he returns home from school his parents confront him about his internet history that includes several trans topics, forcing him to admit he is dating a trans woman and leading to a tearful conversation with his mother about the stigma that has come with dating Kelsa.

During a meeting with the principal including Em, Kelsa and their mothers, Em admits that she made up the assault and apologizes after her mother expresses transphobic opinions, saying that she doesn't wish to become that kind of person. Kelsa and her mother have a heartfelt conversation and reconcile, although Kelsa is still not allowed to put her YouTube channel back up until college. Kelsa and Khal meet at the botanical gardens again and reconcile, bringing each other flowers and admitting that they need to be more open with each other and be willing to accept help when they need it.

They spend the remainder of the school year and the summer spending as much time together as possible. As the summer nears an end, they agree to part amicably because Kelsa will be moving away for college while Khal stays home and pursues an education at a technical school. After parting they reflect on how much they care for each other and how important they've been to each other, even if they were only meant to be together for a short time.

== Cast ==
- Eva Reign as Kelsa
- Abubakr Ali as Khal
- Renée Elise Goldsberry as Selene
- Courtnee Carter as Em
- Kelly Lamor Wilson as Chris
- Grant Reynolds as Otis
- Caroline Travers as Molly
- Lav Raman as Shivani
- Tordy Clark as Minty Fresh
- Noah Pacht as Chance

== Production ==
=== Development ===
In November 2020, it was revealed that actor Billy Porter would be making his feature directorial debut with What If?, from a screenplay by Ximena García Lecuona, which appeared on the 2020 Black List and the 2019 GLAAD List. The film would mark the start of MGM's relaunch of Orion Pictures and deal with Killer Films. The premise has been compared to the likes of Love, Simon and Booksmart. Porter had been approached by the producers to direct. He agreed to sign on 30 pages into the script upon realizing the film would be set in his hometown of Pittsburgh.

It was produced by Christine Vachon and David Hinojosa of Killer Films and Andrew Lauren and D.J. Gugenheim of Andrew Lauren Productions. In April 2022, it was announced the film was re-titled Anything's Possible.

=== Casting ===
It was announced in April 2021 that Yasmin Finney would star as Kelsa. Porter stated he hoped to "populate" the cast with a lot of "true, authentic Pittsburgh people". In July 2021, Eva Reign, Abubakr Ali, Renée Elise Goldsberry, Courtnee Carter, Kelly Lamor Wilson and Grant Reynolds joined the cast of the film, with Reign replacing Finney due to being unable to secure a visa.

=== Filming ===
Principal photography began in July 2021, on location in Pittsburgh and the surrounding areas of Western Pennsylvania.

== Release ==
Originally intended for a theatrical release, it was announced on May 17, 2022, that the film would be released on Amazon Prime Video. On June 1, 2022, it was dated for July 22, 2022. Porter cited the struggles and failures of low-budget and non-MCU franchise films at the box office since the start of the COVID-19 pandemic and the streaming success of the 2021 adaptation of Cinderella (also a Prime Video release which he starred in) as the reasons for the decision. He went on to say "Eyeballs will be on it because you can watch it from your house. Honey, you can watch it from your phone if you want to. And that’s the audience that it’s for." Amazon's March 17, 2022 acquisition of MGM also played a role in the film's move to a streaming release.

== Reception ==
On the review aggregator website Rotten Tomatoes, 86% of 64 critics' reviews are positive, with an average rating of 6.6/10. The website's consensus reads: "Confidently helmed by debuting director Billy Porter, Anything's Possible is a smart, warm-hearted teen rom-com with a powerfully inclusive spin." Metacritic, which uses a weighted average, assigned the film a score of 62 out of 100, based on 17 critics, indicating "generally favorable" reviews.
