= Suwannee Correctional Institution =

Prison in Florida, United States

Coordinates: 30°14′16″N 82°52′06″W

- Interactive map of Suwannee Correctional Institution
- Location: 5964 U.S. 90 Live Oak, Florida, U.S.
- Status: mixed
- Capacity: 1505 + 1346 in Annex = 2851 total
- Opened: 2009
- Managed by: Florida Department of Corrections

The Suwannee Correctional Institution (also SUWCI) is a Florida prison facility for adult males at Live Oak, Florida, two miles west of Wellborn. The camp was established in 2009. The total staff is 724 (as of April 13, 2014) and it has a capacity of 1,505 prisoners. There was an FBI investigation after the death of a prisoner in 2014.

The nearby Suwannee Correctional Institution Annex was established in 2010. It holds another 1,346 inmates at the same security level.

== Notable inmates ==
- Craig Price (murderer) – Serial killer from Rhode Island
- Frederick Pete Cox – Serial killer (at Annex)
- Aiden Fucci - Murderer
- Wade Steven Wilson - Murderer
- Sean Gathright one of the Foolio 5. Guilty for various counts of attempted murder and Murder of Julio Foolio
