= Worst Roommate Ever =

2022 American television series

- Genre: Docu-series
- Directed by: Domini Hofmann; Cynthia Childs
- Country of origin: United States
- Original language: English (Note: With some interviews in Spanish on the episode "Marathon Man".)
- No. of seasons: 2
- No. of episodes: 9

Production
- Running time: 39–62 minutes
- Production companies: ITV America; Blumhouse Television

Original release
- Network: Netflix
- Release: March 1, 2022 – present

Related
- Worst Ex Ever; Worst Neighbor Ever

Worst Roommate Ever is an American true crime docuseries which features stories about roommates with malevolent and sometimes violent intentions who turn the lives of their unsuspecting victims into real-life nightmares. In May 2024, Netflix renewed the series for a second season which premiered on June 26, 2024.

== Episodes ==
Series overview
Season	Episodes	Originally released
1	5	March 1, 2022
2	4	June 26, 2024

=== Season 1 (2022) ===
No. overall	No. in season	Title	Directed by	Original release date	Running time
1	1	"Call Me Grandma"	Domini Hofmann	March 1, 2022	49 min
Dorothea Puente
2	2	"Be Careful of the Quiet Ones"	Domini Hofmann	March 1, 2022	45 min
Murder of Maribel Ramos in Orange, California
3	3	"Marathon Man"	Domini Hofmann	March 1, 2022	62 min
Serial fraudster Youssef Khater tried to kill Callie Quinn in Santiago, Chile.
4	4	"Roommate Wanted - Part 1"	Domini Hofmann	March 1, 2022	39 min
Story of "serial squatter" Jamison Bachman who terrorized his roommates in Philadelphia.
5	5	"Roommate Wanted - Part 2"	Domini Hofmann	March 1, 2022	41 min

=== Season 2 (2024) ===
No. overall	No. in season	Title	Directed by	Original release date	Running time
6	1	"My BFF Tried to Kill Me"	Cynthia Childs	June 26, 2024	53 min
Janie Lynn Ridd in Salt Lake City
7	2	"Housemate from Hell"	Cynthia Childs	June 26, 2024	51 min
Murder of Anita Cowen in Cathedral City, California
8	3	"Burning Down the House"	Cynthia Childs	June 26, 2024	56 min
Attempted murder of James "Bo" Bowden in Colorado Springs, Colorado
9	4	"The Lethal Landlord"	Cynthia Childs	June 26, 2024	53 min
Murder of Austin Wenner and Jessica Lewis in Seattle

== Film adaptation ==
On July 24, 2024, it was announced that Paul Feig is set to direct a feature film adaptation based on the article by William Brennan. Jason Blum will produce the film through his Blumhouse Productions banner, alongside Feig.
