= Eyes of Hellfire =

2025 video game

- Developer: Gambrinous
- Publisher: Blumhouse Games
- Director: Colm Larkin
- Producer: Úna-Minh Kavanagh
- Designer: Angelo Nikolaou
- Programmer: Owen Canavan
- Artist: Fred Mangan
- Writer: Len Cunningham
- Composer: Gary Keane
- Engine: Unity
- Platform: Microsoft Windows
- Release: August 27, 2025 (Early Access)
- Genre: Horror
- Mode: Multiplayer

Eyes of Hellfire is a 2025 co-op horror indie game developed by Gambrinous and published by Blumhouse Games. The game was released on Early Access for free on August 27, 2025 on Windows.

== Gameplay ==
Eyes of Hellfire takes place in the Hell Fire Club lodge, setting in a twisted, horror version of the Montpelier Hill in County Dublin, Ireland, where each player up to 5 has a special but dark curse that twist their abilities and motives as they navigate through ever-shifting rooms with a card-management system, allowing one of them to think carefully, share their discoveries through unsettling lore, and combine their strengths to solve cryptic puzzles and survive the threats within the manor.

== Development ==
Studio Gambrinous focuses their game around tabletop and board game as their inspiration upon the horror genre, such as Cardpocalypse and Guild of Dungeoneering, and was also critical to their experimentation that this is their first jump into multiplayer gameplay, describing their game as friction co-op; meaning that players have to work close as a team, but with each a cruse card, allowing one of them to cruse their own player to a more self-serving goal in order to lift one to another's cruse. The game also features Liam Cunningham, Len Cunningham’s father, from Game of Thrones and 3 Body Problem as the voice of the players’ reality. The game was released on Early Access on Steam on August 27, 2025.
