= Wade Wilson (criminal) =

American murderer (born 1994)

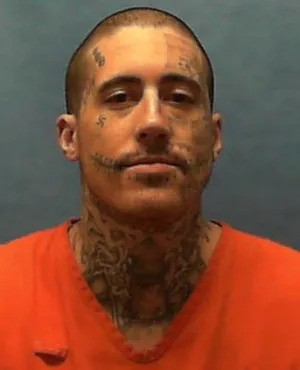
- One of Wilson's mugshots, taken in 2024 at the Union Correctional Institution
- Born: Wade Steven Wilson; May 20, 1994 (age 32)
- Other names: The Cape Coral Strangler, Deadpool Killer
- Convictions: November 2013: burglary and grand theft; 2017: firearm theft; June 12, 2024: first degree murder
- Criminal charges: Six charges, including murder
- Penalty: 2 death sentences

Details
- Victims: 2 confirmed
- State: Florida
- Date apprehended: November 26, 2013: burglary and grand theft; 2015: for sexual battery (acquitted); October 17, 2017: for firearm theft; July 1, 2019: for battery; October 8, 2019: for the murders of Kristine Melton and Diane Ruiz; September 30, 2020: for an attempted escape from jail

Wade Steven Wilson (born May 20, 1994) is an American criminal convicted of the 2019 murders of Kristine Melton and Diane Ruiz in Cape Coral, Florida. Due to sharing the name of the Marvel character Wade "Deadpool" Wilson, Wilson has been referred to in the media as the "Deadpool Killer".

Wilson was sentenced to death in 2024 after being found guilty of two counts first-degree murder, among other charges. Prior to the murders, Wilson had a criminal history dating back to 2010, including convictions for burglary, grand theft, and firearms offenses.

== Life and early crimes ==
Wade Steven Wilson was born on May 20, 1994 to teenage parents. He was adopted by Steve and Candace Wilson and raised in Tallahassee, Florida, where he attended Chiles High School. During his youth, Wilson was often described as "troubled" and was reportedly involved in minor criminal activities and substance abuse. He also sustained several head injuries during his childhood (4 concussions) and adolescence, which he later cited as contributing to his feelings of instability.

His encounters with the law began in 2012 in Leon County where he was involved in various incidents, including burglary, assault, and firearm-related offenses. In November 2013, Wilson was sentenced to prison for burglary and grand theft, serving until September 2014. In 2015, he faced charges of sexual battery and kidnapping after a woman accused him of assaulting her in his vehicle following a party. However, he was acquitted of these charges by a jury.

Wilson was a witness and informant for the Leon County Sheriff's Office in the 2016-2018 case against Brian Winchester who was also Wilson's cellmate. Wilson said he was offered $20,000 to kill Winchester's wife. Wilson then informed the police, claiming he didn't feel right about it.

By 2017, Wilson was incarcerated again for stealing firearms, serving until July 2018. Later in 2018, he was mentioned in connection with the case of Jerry Michael “Mike” Willams, the target of an alleged murder for hire plotted by his wife Denise Willams, while serving time with Wilson. He has said he received $20,000 in a white Manila envelope at a meet-up post-release while on probation to carry out the attack. In February 2019, his former girlfriend reported an incident in which he allegedly assaulted and choked her. Although she accused him of kidnapping and rape, investigators did not pursue these charges stating there was a lack of evidence. DNA was collected at that time but the case was closed before the DNA was processed. On July 1, 2019, Wilson was arrested again for battery.

== Murders ==
On October 7, 2019, Wilson committed two murders within hours of each other. After Wilson met the first victim, Kristine Melton, he strangled her in her home. Then he left the body wrapped in carpets and bedding in the house. Later that day, after luring Diane Ruiz into his car under false pretenses, Wilson murdered the waitress and mother of two. After strangling Ruiz, he realized that she was still breathing, so he drove his car over her multiple times until, as Wilson himself admitted, "she looked like spaghetti". He sexually assaulted her after he killed her. He called his biological father, Steven Testasecca, soon afterwards and confessed to murdering the women. Testasecca and his wife called the police and Wilson was arrested the following day. He told detectives that he would be willing to "do it again".

== Legal proceedings and public reaction ==
During legal proceedings, evidence of Wilson's mental health was presented, including testimony about his brain injuries. A neurologist testified that brain scans showed trauma and impairment which might explain some of Wilson's impulsive behaviors. However, experts for the prosecution argued that drug abuse was a more significant factor in his actions. The defense claimed that Wilson's drug abuse could have impaired his judgment at the time of the crime.

Wilson's biological father, Steven Testasecca, testified against him in court, recounting details of his confession over the phone. Testasecca stated that his son ran over Ruiz after realizing she was not yet dead, and also could not explain his motives beyond "I just wanted to do it." More than the required 8 out of the 12 jurors recommended the death penalty for Wilson (9 for the murder of Melton and 10 for the murder of Ruiz). Having the power to take or disregard the jury's suggestion, judge Nicholas Thompson imposed two death sentences. Wilson is appealing the decision to the Supreme Court of Florida.

Wilson's sentencing was marked by public interest and controversy, including numerous messages from individuals pleading for clemency. His case raised questions about the intersection of mental health, criminal behavior, and the justice system. The case attracted extensive media coverage, partly because of Wilson's common name with the well-known fictional character Deadpool aka Wade Wilson of the Marvel Comic books and subsequent films. Public reactions were mixed, with some expressing sympathy due to his mental health issues, while others focused on the brutality of his crimes.

== Incarceration ==
In jail, while awaiting trial for the murders, Wilson applied multiple tattoos on his face, including a Swastika under his right eye and a larger Swastika on the side of his head.

In 2020, Wilson and his cellmate were accused of tampering with a window in their cell in an attempt to escape. Wilson, who was reportedly the primary planner and instigator of the escape effort, also tried to set up a getaway car. In 2023, he pleaded nolo contendere to smuggling drugs into prison, in exchange for having charges relating to an alleged escape attempt dropped. He was sentenced to a fine and 12 years in prison, to be served concurrently with his death penalties. Wilson survived a drug overdose at Lee County Jail in 2023. The incident prompted an investigation by the Lee County Sheriff's Office. Investigators uncovered a conspiracy to traffic illegal drugs into the jail. Four others were also charged in the incident.

In July 2025, Wilson was transferred to Suwannee Correctional Institution, which does not have a designated death row unit. As of July 10, 2026, Wilson is residing at Union Correctional Institution in Raiford, FL on death row.

== In the media ==
Wilson appeared briefly in the docuseries Mr. & Mrs. Murder that streamed on Hulu in 2025. He is shown giving the police a statement against his former cellmate.

On May 6, 2026, the second season of Netflix's Worst Ex Ever was released, and included an episode on the murders committed by Wilson, titled "Dating the Deadpool Killer."

== See also ==
- Capital punishment in Florida
- List of death row inmates in the United States § Florida
