= Crisol: Theater of Idols =

2026 video game

- Developer: Vermila Studios
- Publisher: Blumhouse Games
- Director: David Tornero
- Producers: Iulen Muñoz Murillo; Cristina Sánchez Jiménez
- Designer: David Tornero
- Programmer: Javier Larraz Nsue
- Artist: Helena Sánchez García
- Writers: David Tornero; Alby Ojeda Cruz
- Composer: Xavi Qués Bravo
- Engine: Unreal Engine 5
- Platforms: PlayStation 5; Windows; Xbox Series X/S
- Release: 10 February 2026
- Genre: Survival horror
- Mode: Single-player

Crisol: Theater of Idols is a first-person survival horror video game developed by Vermila Studios and published by Blumhouse Games for PlayStation 5, Windows and Xbox Series X/S.

== Gameplay ==
The game follows Gabriel Escudero, an assassin sent from the Sun God, as he ventures through the island of Tormentosa, Hispania, a twisted version of Spain crawling with living puppet-like statues. Using weapons merged with the holy Sun God, players can kill them at any part of the puppet statues body. However, each weapon costs some blood from the player's health bar. Unlike most first-person shooters that have guns with ammo, the weapons Gabriel carry are not loaded with bullets but are instead loaded with his blood. Finding corpses of animals and people will not only regain their health, but also help reload the player's weapons if they run out of blood. Players can upgrade their weapons by spending Sliver Bull coins to the witch, La Plañidera, and unlock skills with the Essence collected from the defeated status and Crow Relics scattered across the island. Finding crows caged up will help discount the price the player needs to upgrade.

== Development ==
Developer Vermila Studios is based in Madrid, Spain. Blumhouse Games showcased Crisol during the Summer Game Fest on 7 June 2024. The game takes inspiration from horror games such as Resident Evil and BioShock.

== Reception ==
Reception

Aggregate scores
| Aggregator | Score |
|---|---|
| Metacritic | (PC) 74/100 (PS5) 73/100 (XSXS) 78/100 |
| OpenCritic | 70% recommended (Note: Based on 54 reviews) |

Review scores
| Publication | Score |
|---|---|
| Computer Games Magazine | 7.5/10 |
| Destructoid | 7/10 |
| GameSpot | 6/10 |
| GamesRadar+ | 2.5/5 |
| Shacknews | 6/10 |

Crisol: Theater of Idols received "mixed or average" reviews for the Windows and PlayStation 5 versions while the Xbox Series X/S version received "generally favorable" reviews, according to review aggregator website Metacritic. 68% of critics recommended Crisol: Theater of Idols on OpenCritic.
