= Fear the Spotlight =

2024 video game

- Developer: Cozy Game Pals
- Publisher: Blumhouse Games
- Directors: Bryan Singh; Crista Castro
- Programmer: Bryan Singh
- Artist: Crista Castro
- Engine: Unity
- Platforms: Nintendo Switch; PlayStation 4; PlayStation 5; Windows; Xbox One; Xbox Series X/S
- Release: October 22, 2024
- Genre: Survival horror
- Mode: Single-player

Fear the Spotlight is a 2024 survival horror stealth game developed by Cozy Game Pals and published by Blumhouse Games. The game follows high school students Vivian and Amy, who become involved with supernatural events at their high school after a seance gone wrong.

The game was developed by husband-and-wife team Bryan Singh and Crista Castro, who began the project in 2022 and were inspired by the beginnings of their own relationship. They released an initial version on Steam in 2023. Shortly afterwards, the game was discovered by Blumhouse Games, who reached out to Castro and Singh and offered them support to expand the game and publish it for consoles, which they accepted; Fear the Spotlight became the company's flagship game.

Fear the Spotlight was released for Nintendo Switch, PlayStation 4, PlayStation 5, Xbox One, Windows, and Xbox Series X/S on 22 October 2024 with a positive reception.

== Plot ==
Booksmart Vivian Singh and goth Amy Tanaka are two high school students and close friends, with Vivian secretly in love with Amy. Amy convinces Vivian to sneak into their high school Sunnyside High, where they use a ouija board in their library to conduct a seance in hopes of communicating with spirits of students who perished in a fire at the school in 1991. During the seance, Amy reveals that she had felt a spirit following her in the halls, before a figure behind her appears, and Amy vanishes. Vivian searches for her around the seemingly changed Sunnyside and finds her, only for Amy to be sucked in a fire that begins consuming the school, forcing Vivian to flee through an opening at the students' memorial.

Vivian finds herself in a decaying, shifting version of Sunnyside in 1991, where she encounters several ghostly spirits and odd puzzles. She discovers several notes from that year about an unpopular student named Chrissy Santos who had a crush on school jock Raoul Rousseau, hoping to get his attention by auditioning for a part in their local production of The Phantom of the Opera. This angered popular girl Heather Moore, the daughter of the superintendent whose influence covered up Heather's bullying. Heather and Raoul won the lead roles, while Chrissy was delegated as an understudy, but gains a secret admirer. In the locker room, Vivian encounters a monstrous being with a spotlight for a head, who pursues her in different parts of the school. She manages to call a distant Amy who invites her to a show she is headlining. Going further into a school, Vivian hears another call where Amy mocks Vivian's feelings for her, but this does not dissuade Vivian. The entrance to Amy's show is on fire, and Vivian instead goes through an underground cavern that prior students often hung out in, but were always kicked out by their stage director, Mr. Crane.

Amy, meanwhile, finds herself separated from Vivian, where she explores the school and finds an entity trapped in a prison cell. She ends up in a haunted version of her own home, where she explores her personal history as well as her relationship with Vivian. She encounters the Woman of Black Water, a ghostly figure from a movie she saw as a child, who begins pursuing her around the house. She realizes she is trapped in her consciousness and that the spotlight man is puppeteering her body.

While navigating her way through the tunnels, Vivian discovers more letters. Chrissy's secret admirer sabotaged a pool dive that injured Heather, granting Chrissy the lead role. Chrissy and Raoul became a couple, but Raoul went missing and the admirer sent a threatening letter about feeling betrayed by Chrissy. Chrissy wanted to quit but was not allowed to by Crane, whom she suspects is behind Raoul's disappearance. Chrissy's fears are confirmed after finding out that her admirer is indeed Crane, who has a secret hideout in the tunnels that obsessively watches Chrissy's every move in school. Before she could confront Crane, she is called to begin the show. Vivian finds a prison cell where Raoul was held, where Raoul was seemingly bludgeoned to death and cremated. She finds her way inside the theater, where she finds notes where Crane rigged a chandelier to fall and kill Chrissy, in turn causing the fire that killed the students.

As Amy explores her home further, she is shown to be strained with her brother Jun, who went to take care of their ill estranged father, who left them as children after cheating on their mother. Amy is informed by her father and his partner Erica that Jun died in a plane crash when he was on his way to visit their father. Amy meets the entity, Jun's spirit, and reconciles with him before she escapes the Woman and breaks from her trance. She finds herself in a cage where Vivian finally finds and reunites with her.

The girls are confronted by the spotlight man, who reveals himself as Crane, who believes Amy is a revived Chrissy. Vivian battles Crane until she manages to defeat and kill him, freeing Amy. The dimension begins falling apart, and the two girls escape. Vivian and Amy wake up in the library, where Vivian confesses her feelings for Amy. Amy reveals she also likes her, and they leave the school together, returning the ouija board and evading their teachers. Before they leave, Vivian then uncovers files implicating Crane and the school for covering up the fire, and exposes it to the local newspaper, causing Sunnyside to shut down. Some time later, Vivian goes to Amy's house to have their first date watching a scary movie together.

== Gameplay ==
The game follows high school students Vivian Singh (Khaya Fraites) and Amy Tanaka (Maganda Marie) as they sneak their way through their school at night after hours to perform a séance only to let an ancient supernatural entity take the form of a stage spotlight (Bryan Singh). As a stealth approach, players must control Vivian or Amy to avoid the spotlight or get killed by the entity.

== Development ==
Developer Cozy Game Pals is based in Los Angeles, California. Fear the Spotlight was first announced in April 2022, with a playable demo released the same day. Shortly after release on Steam, Zach Wood and Louise Blain of Blumhouse Games discovered the game after seeing it on Twitter and were impressed by its potential. Blumhouse reached out to the developers, offering to publish the game for consoles, localize it into other languages, and give them an additional year to expand the game, which they accepted. Following this, Blumhouse announced during their line-up from the Summer Game Fest on June 7, 2024, that their first game to publish is an atmospheric horror adventure, Fear the Spotlight, developed by Cozy Game Pals, founded by husband and wife Bryan Singh and Crista Castro.

The game takes inspiration from classic 1990s teen horror stories and cinematic classics such as Phantom of the Opera and The Conjuring, or classic old horror games like Resident Evil, Silent Hill, and Fatal Frame but as a twisted homage/love letter to the "fun horror" the developers made.

== Release ==
A steam demo was released in September 2024, one month before the game's release. In October 2025, in celebration of the game's first anniversary, a physical release for PlayStation 5 was announced in partnership with iam8bit, and set for release in March 2026. Additionally, the Windows version of the game was made available to claim for free for a limited time on the Epic Games Store.

== Graphic novel ==
In October 2025, it was announced that Blumhouse Games’ first horror game is getting a graphic novel adaptation from Asgard Books as a one-year anniversary titled Fear the Spotlight: Fight Through the Fear, with Sonic Prime writer Patricia Villetto and Life Is Strange artist Claudia Leonardi retelling the game and expanding new elements within the story. The book is set to be release later in 2026.

== Reception ==
Reception

Aggregate scores
| Aggregator | Score |
|---|---|
| Metacritic | PC: 74/100; PS5: 83/100; XSXS: 78/100; NS: 75/100 |
| OpenCritic | 87% recommended |

Review scores
| Publication | Score |
|---|---|
| Computer Games Magazine | 9.5/10 |
| Eurogamer | 3/5 |
| GameSpot | 7/10 |
| GamesRadar+ | 4/5 |
| Nintendo Life | 9/10 |
| Nintendo World Report | 8 |
| Push Square | 7/10 |

Fear the Spotlight received "generally favorable reviews" based on 18 critic reviews according to review aggregator website Metacritic. 87% of critics recommended Fear the Spotlight on OpenCritic.

TheGamer gave the game a positive review on its compelling storytelling and remarkable presentation but lacks the options that makes the challenge trivial for experienced players and stealth sections too obnoxious to handle. Bloody Disgusting also gave a great review as Blumhouse's perfect gateway to the horror game genre from their game division and a 4 out of 5 rating on its heartfelt story with clever tactile puzzles and spooky sequences that never gets too scary, but not as a bad thing. PlayStation Universe gave the game a 9 out of 10 on the incredible atmosphere and the creepy PS1-era style to a great story. Shaun Cichacki of Vice called the game's visual design "incredibly charming and beautiful" and praised the interactivity of the puzzles.
