= Sleep Awake (video game) =

2025 video game

- Developer: Eyes Out
- Publisher: Blumhouse Games
- Directors: Cory Davis; Robin Finck
- Designer: Clay Westing
- Programmer: Chris Brown
- Artist: Stephen Ratter
- Writers: Bryan Keithley; Jordan Guerette; Max Wong; Clay Westing
- Composer: Robin Finck (Note: Additional music by Jordan Guerette, Morgan Sorne, Josh Freese, and Cory Davis)
- Engine: Unreal Engine 4
- Platforms: PlayStation 5; Windows; Xbox Series X/S
- Release: December 2, 2025
- Genres: Walking simulator, psychological horror
- Mode: Single player

Sleep Awake is a 2025 first person psychological horror indie game developed by Eyes Out, founded by Spec Ops: The Line's Cory Davis and Robin Finck of Nine Inch Nails, and published by Blumhouse Games. The game was released on December 2, 2025, on PlayStation 5, Windows and Xbox Series X/S with a mixed reception.

== Gameplay ==
Players play as Katja (played by Persia Numan) in an ever-shifting far futuristic world of The Crush, navigating through death cults and otherworldy forces, all while trying to stay awake. While this game include puzzles to solve and stealth sequences to avoid a group known as the DTM, the key factor to this is the eyedrops on the player known as an anti-sleep defusion. If the player falls asleep, it could mean certain doom.

== Development ==
Developer Eyes Out is based in Los Angeles. Blumhouse Games showcased Sleep Awake during the Summer Game Fest on June 7, 2024. The game features an original score from the game's co-director Robin Finck of Nine Inch Nails, giving the music a visceral journey with brooding guitar motifs, immersive synth passages and evolving rhythmic pulses, all while capturing the emotional and existingal depths and stylistic inventiveness.

== Release ==
During the Indie Horror Showcase, the game was announced to be released on December 2, 2025.

== Reception ==
Reception

Aggregate scores
Aggregator	Score
Metacritic	PC: 63/100; PS5: 73/100
OpenCritic	50% recommended

Review scores
Publication	Score
GamesRadar+	2.5/5
Shacknews	8/10

Sleep Awake received "mixed or average reviews" based on 12 critic reviews according to review aggregator website Metacritic. 50% of critics recommended Sleep Awake on OpenCritic.

Polygon gave it a good review on the visuals and soundtrack with an off-the-wall plot being more grounded in reality for a satisfying, thought-provoking, and truly unique experience. Bloody Disgusting gave the game a solid 3 out of 5 for the visuals but lacks a weak story with undercooked gameplay elements.
