= The Supernatural Enhancements =

- Author: Edgar Cantero
- Language: English
- Genre: horror, mystery
- Set in: Virginia
- Published: August 12, 2014
- Publisher: Doubleday (English)
- Publication place: United States
- Media type: Print, e-book
- Pages: 368 pages
- ISBN: 0385538154
- Preceded by: Vallvi

The Supernatural Enhancements is a 2014 horror / mystery novel and the English language literary debut of Spanish cartoonist and author Edgar Cantero. The work was released on August 12, 2014, through Doubleday; the author also co-translated it to Spanish as El factor sobrenatural, published by Minotauro in May 2015. It is an epistolary novel, whose story is told via diary entries, recordings, notes, letters, and other personal effects that are arranged to appear as if they were collected and compiled at an undetermined point of time after the novel's events.

== Synopsis ==
The story takes place in the fictional town of Point Bless, Virginia during the fall and winter of 1995. It centers upon two characters, a 23-year-old European young man referred to only as "A." and a 16-year-old mute Irish girl named Niamh, who have traveled to Point Bless upon inheriting a rumoredly haunted mansion from Ambrose Wells, a distant cousin of A., who died in the house after throwing himself out of a third story window. Soon after they move in the two begin to experience paranormal phenomena, while their research on the deceased relative's life hints to a secret society that would hold a yearly gathering at Wells' home.

== Reception ==
Critical reception for The Supernatural Enhancements has been largely positive. The Press & Journal and Buffalo News both wrote favorable reviews for the work, with The Press & Journal writing that "The style won’t be to everyone’s taste, but it is refreshingly original, drawing the reader into A and Niamh’s world as they uncover the disturbing secrets that lie hidden within the sprawling mansion." GeekDad compared the book favorably to J. J. Abrams's S. and stated that it was "eerie and fun and full of surprises."

Publishers Weekly was more critical in their review, opining that "The merging of the otherworldly and the mundane, however, breaks down when a long explanation of a secret society’s aims and history overwhelms the plot and paves the way to a deus ex machina conclusion."
