= Best European Fiction =

Best European Fiction is an annual anthology of European short stories published by Dalkey Archive Press since 2010. The first four editions were edited by the Bosnian American novelist Aleksandar Hemon, whilst the 2014 anthology was edited by the Slovenian writer Drago Jančar. The 2015 volume was edited by West Camel, both the 2016 and 2017 editions were edited by Nathaniel Davis, and the 2018 and 2019 volumes were edited by Alex Andriesse. Some of the contributors have never before been translated into English, although they have been writing in their own languages for decades.

== Editions and preface writers ==
- Best European Fiction 2010 – Zadie Smith
- Best European Fiction 2011 – Colum McCann
- Best European Fiction 2012 – Nicole Krauss
- Best European Fiction 2013 – John Banville
- Best European Fiction 2014 – Drago Jančar
- Best European Fiction 2015 – Enrique Vila-Matas
- Best European Fiction 2016 – Jon Fosse
- Best European Fiction 2017 – Eileen Battersby
- Best European Fiction 2018 – Alex Andriesse
- Best European Fiction 2019 – Alex Andriesse
