= Ximena García Lecuona =

Mexican-American screenwriter

- Born: Mexico
- Occupations: screenwriter and film producer
- Known for: Anything's Possible

Ximena García Lecuona is a Mexican–American screenwriter and film producer. She is best known for writing the 2022 American coming-of-age romantic comedy film Anything's Possible.

== Biography ==
García Lecuona was born and raised in Mexico. She came out as nonbinary and later came out as a transgender woman.

She made her debut as a screenwriter and as an executive producer with the film Anything's Possible, directed by Billy Porter. García Lecuona wrote the story to Anything's Possible about "trans joy" and "trans love." The film premiered at Outfest Los Angeles LGBTQ+ Film Festival, which she attended.

She was honored as one of Variety's "Screenwriters to Watch" at the Mill Valley Film Festival in 2022.

In August 2022, García Lecuona adapted Sara Jo Cuff's LGBT coming-of-age story The Kiss List into a screenplay, which will be directed by Sonía Sebastian. The initial story, about a girl who makes a list of guys she wants to kiss, was changed by García Lecuona to make the protagonist bisexual. The film was developed by MarVista Entertainment.

== Filmography ==
=== Feature films ===
Year	Title	Director	Writer	Producer	Notes
2022	Anything's Possible	No	Yes	Executive	
2023	The Kiss List	No	Yes	No	
2025	No me sigas	Yes	Yes	No	Directorial debut; co-directed with Eduardo Lecuona; also story

=== Short films ===
Year	Title	Director	Writer	Producer	Notes
2016	Goatsucker	No	Yes	Yes	
2018	Satanic Panic!	No	Yes	No	Co-written with Olivia Song; also story
