= Blumhouse Productions =

American film and TV production company

Blumhouse Productions, LLC
- Logo used since 2012
- Trade name: Blumhouse
- Formerly: Blum Israel Productions (2000–2002)
- Type: Private
- Industry: Motion picture
- Founded: September 30, 2000; 26 years ago
- Founder: Jason Blum; Amy Israel
- Headquarters: Los Angeles, California, United States
- Area served: Worldwide
- Key people: Jason Blum; Couper Samuelson; Beatriz Sequeira; Ryan Turek; Jennifer Scudder Trent; Karen Barragan; Abhijay Prakash; Samuel Zimmerman
- Services: Film production; Television production
- Owner: Universal Pictures (majority stake)
- Parent: Blumhouse Atomic
- Divisions: Haunted Movies; BH Tilt (with Neon); Blumhouse International; BlumHansonAllen Films; Blumhouse Television; Blumhouse Books; Blumhouse Games
- Website: blumhouse.com

Blumhouse Productions, LLC, doing business as Blumhouse (/ˈblʌmhaʊs/; also known as BH Productions or simply BH), is an American independent film and television production company founded on September 30, 2000 by Jason Blum and Amy Israel. Most of the company's theatrically released films since 2014 are owned and distributed by Universal Pictures as part of a ten-year first-look deal.

Blumhouse is known mainly for producing horror films, such as the Paranormal Activity franchise, the Insidious franchise, Sinister, The Purge franchise, the Creep franchise, Split, Get Out, Happy Death Day as well as its sequel Happy Death Day 2U, the Halloween franchise (2018–2022), Us, Freaky, The Invisible Man (2020), the Black Phone franchise, the M3GAN franchise, Five Nights at Freddy's, Speak No Evil and Obsession.

It has also produced drama films, such as Whiplash and BlacKkKlansman, which both earned nominations for the Academy Award for Best Picture. Get Out and BlacKkKlansman won Academy Awards for Best Original Screenplay and Best Adapted Screenplay, respectively. It has worked with directors such as James Wan, Leigh Whannell, Jordan Peele, Scott Derrickson, Christopher Landon, Patrick Brice, Mike Flanagan, James DeMonaco, Jeff Wadlow, Damien Chazelle, M. Night Shyamalan, David Gordon Green, Paul Greengrass, Emma Tammi and Curry Barker.

== Overview ==
=== Film ===
Blumhouse's company model is to produce films on a small budget, give directors creative freedom, and release films widely through the studio system. Blumhouse was originally known as Blum Israel Productions, as Amy Israel had a first-look deal at Miramax when the company was founded. In 2002, Blum and Israel parted ways, and the company became Blumhouse Productions. In 2015, Crypt TV was created by Jack Davis and Eli Roth which is backed by Blum and the company.

Blumhouse's low-budget model began in 2007 with Paranormal Activity, which was made for $15,000 and grossed over $193 million worldwide. It produced Insidious, which grossed over $100 million worldwide on a budget of $1.5 million; and Sinister, which grossed over $87 million worldwide from a budget of $3 million.

In 2017, Blumhouse announced a partnership with DreamWorks Animation to co-produce Spooky Jack but the film was removed from DreamWorks Animation's slate in 2019.

On November 16, 2022, it was announced that James Wan's Atomic Monster was in talks to merge with Blumhouse, with Atomic Monster having a shared first-look deal with Universal. Both companies would continue to operate as separate labels, with each maintaining its own creative autonomy and brand identity. The merger was finalized on January 2, 2024. In November 2026, the company was renamed to Blumhouse Atomic.

On June 4, 2025, it was announced that the company was in talks to acquire Twisted Pictures' stake in the Saw franchise, with Lionsgate still being involved. Later that month, the acquisition was finalized and the deal would have James Wan and Leigh Whannell regain creative control for the future of the franchise. In 2026, James Tynion IV, the comic creator signed a deal with Blumhouse Atomic Partners to develop properties.

=== Television, video games, books, podcasts and haunted houses ===
In 2012, Blumhouse opened the Blumhouse of Horrors, an interactive haunted house experience in Downtown Los Angeles.

In November 2014, it launched Blumhouse Books, to publish original horror and thriller novels.

In February 2023, it launched Blumhouse Games to produce and publish original horror-themed video games for console, PC and mobile devices as part longer-term effort to branch out into interactive media. The division would join up with independent developers and focus on games with budgets of under $10 million. It would offer financing and help with creative input. The company appointed Zach Wood as President and Don Sechler as CFO of the new venture. No specific projects were discussed at the time of the announcement.

== Highest-grossing films ==
Highest-grossing Blumhouse films in North America
Rank	Title	Year	Domestic gross	Ref.
1	Obsession	2026	$263,451,715	
2	Get Out	2017	$176,196,665	
3	Us	2019	$175,084,580	
4	Halloween	2018	$159,366,015	
5	Split	2017	$138,291,365	
6	Five Nights at Freddy's	2023	$137,275,620	
7	Five Nights at Freddy's 2	2025	$127,730,290	
8	Glass	2019	$111,048,468	
9	Paranormal Activity	2009	$107,918,810	
10	Paranormal Activity 3	2011	$104,028,807	

Highest-grossing Blumhouse films worldwide
Rank	Title	Year	Box office gross	Ref.
1	Obsession	2026	$524,407,429	
2	Five Nights at Freddy's	2023	$298,267,333	
3	Split	2017	$278,754,594	
4	Halloween	2018	$259,939,869	
5	Get Out	2017	$259,861,530	
6	Us	2019	$256,071,218	
7	Glass	2019	$246,999,039	
8	Five Nights at Freddy's 2	2025	$239,568,877	
9	Paranormal Activity 3	2011	$207,039,844	
10	Paranormal Activity	2009	$194,183,034	

== BH Tilt ==
BH Tilt, LLC
- Logo used since 2014
- Type: Subsidiary
- Founded: September 9, 2014; 12 years ago
- Founder: Jason Blum
- Headquarters: Los Angeles, California, United States
- Parent: Blumhouse Productions, LLC (with Neon)

Blumhouse Tilt, LLC, doing business as BH Tilt, was established on September 9, 2014, a new label dedicated to generating movies from Blumhouse and other filmmakers for multi-platform release.

On September 7, 2017, Blumhouse partnered with Neon, a distribution company, to manage BH Tilt with the aim of achieving long-term sustainable success.

BH Tilt's releases are: The Green Inferno, The Darkness, Incarnate, The Resurrection of Gavin Stone, The Belko Experiment, Sleight, Lowriders, Birth of the Dragon, Upgrade, Unfriended: Dark Web and Don't Let Go.

== Blumhouse Games ==
Blumhouse Games is a division of Blumhouse Productions that produces original horror video games.

The gaming division focuses on indie budget projects with production costs below $10 million.

In November 2023, Blumhouse Games hired Jo Lammert as the production lead and Clint Brewer as the technical director.

== Blumhouse Books ==
Blumhouse Books, LLC
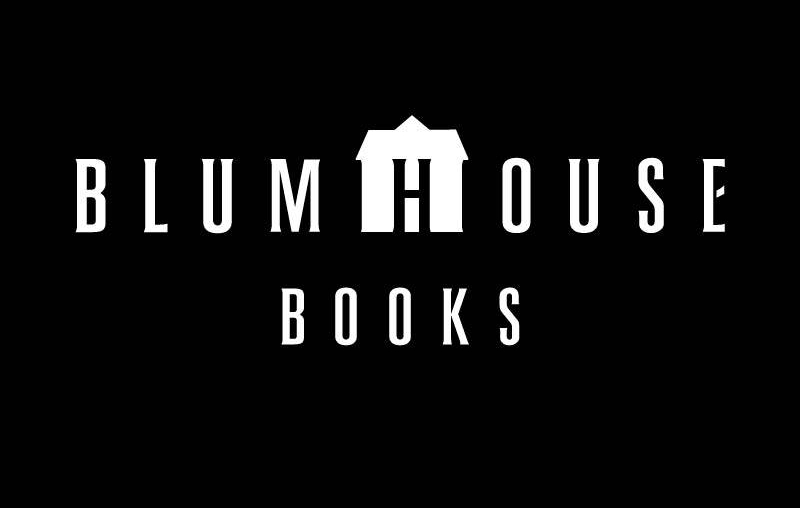
- Logo used since 2014
- Industry: Books
- Founded: 2014; 12 years ago
- Founder: Jason Blum
- Headquarters: Los Angeles, California, United States
- Parent: Blumhouse Productions

Blumhouse Books is a publishing company that specializes in horror novels. It was founded in 2014 as a subsidiary of Blumhouse Productions.

=== Novels published by Blumhouse Books ===
1. The Blumhouse Book of Nightmares: The Haunted City (2015)
2. The Apartment (2016)
3. Feral (2017)
4. Meddling Kids (2017)
5. Haunted Nights (2017)
6. This Body's Not Big Enough for Both of Us (2018)
7. Bad Man (2018)
8. Hark! The Herald Angels Scream (2018)
9. Happy Death Day & Happy Death Day 2U (2019)
10. The Invisible Man (Movie Tie-in) (2020)
11. Final Cuts: New Tales of Hollywood Horror and Other Spectacles (2020)
12. Horror's New Wave: 15 Years of Blumhouse (2025)

== See also ==
- Dark Castle Entertainment
- Ghost House Pictures
- Gold Circle Films
- Platinum Dunes
- Twisted Pictures
- Vertigo Entertainment
- Atomic Monster
- Lionsgate
- Monkeypaw Productions
- Universal Pictures
