= Just in Time =

Just in Time may refer to:

== Music ==
- Just in Time (album), by Larry Willis, 1989
- Just in Time, an album by Maura O'Connell, 1988
- Just in Time: The Final Recording, an album by Buddy Rich, 2019
- "Just in Time" (song), written by Jule Styne, Betty Comden, and Adolph Green for the musical Bells Are Ringing, 1956
- "Just in Time", a song by JID from The Forever Story, 2022

== Film, television and theatre ==
- Just in Time (film), a 1997 American film directed by Shawn Levy
- Just in Time, a 2006 film starring Tiffany Mulheron
- Just in Time (TV series), a 1988 American sitcom
- "Just in Time" (Code Lyoko), a 2003 TV episode
- Just in Time (musical), a 2025 musical about Bobby Darin

== Other uses ==
- Just-in-time manufacturing, a production strategy
- Just-in-time compilation, a method to improve the runtime performance of computer programs
- Just-in-time learning, a method to connect the learner and the content at the moment the need is recognized
- Just-in-time teaching, a strategy to improve learning outcomes

== See also ==
- Justin Time (disambiguation)
- Nick of Time (disambiguation)
