= Henry Gayden =

American screenwriter and producer

- Born: December 28, 1979 (age 45); Memphis, Tennessee, U.S.
- Occupation: Screenwriter
- Years active: 2010–present

Henry Gayden (born December 28, 1979) is an American screenwriter, best known for writing the films Earth to Echo (2014), Shazam! (2019) and There's Someone Inside Your House (2021).

== Career ==
Gayden was born in Memphis, Tennessee. In his youth, Gayden attended Memphis University School and after graduation, he commenced his studies at the University of Texas at Austin where he majored in English and radio-television-film. During his time at college, he worked as an entertainment editor for The Daily Texan. After graduating from his degree, he moved to Los Angeles to pursue a career in screenwriting.

In 2013, Gayden worked on the script for the 2014 science-fiction adventure film titled Earth to Echo, which was later directed by Dave Green.

In 2017, Gayden was hired to rewrite Darren Lemke's script for the DC Extended Universe superhero film Shazam!, directed by David F. Sandberg and starring Zachary Levi, Mark Strong, Asher Angel, Jack Dylan Grazer and Djimon Hounsou. Upon release, the film received positive reviews. In April 2019, TheWrap reported that Gayden will return to helm the script for the sequel Shazam! Fury of the Gods.

In March 2018, it was announced that Gayden would write the script for the Netflix slasher film, There's Someone Inside Your House, an adaptation the 2017 novel of the same name by Stephanie Perkins, with Patrick Brice directing. The film was produced by Shawn Levy's 21 Laps Entertainment and James Wan's Atomic Monster, and was released on October 6, 2021.

== Filmography ==
Writer

- Ham Sandwich (2011) (Short film)
- Earth to Echo (2014)
- Shazam! (2019)
- There's Someone Inside Your House (2021)
- Shazam! Fury of the Gods (2023)

Thanks

- Meltdown (2009)
- The Monster (2016)
- Golden Arm (2020)
