= Shawn Levy =

Canadian-American filmmaker and actor (born 1968)

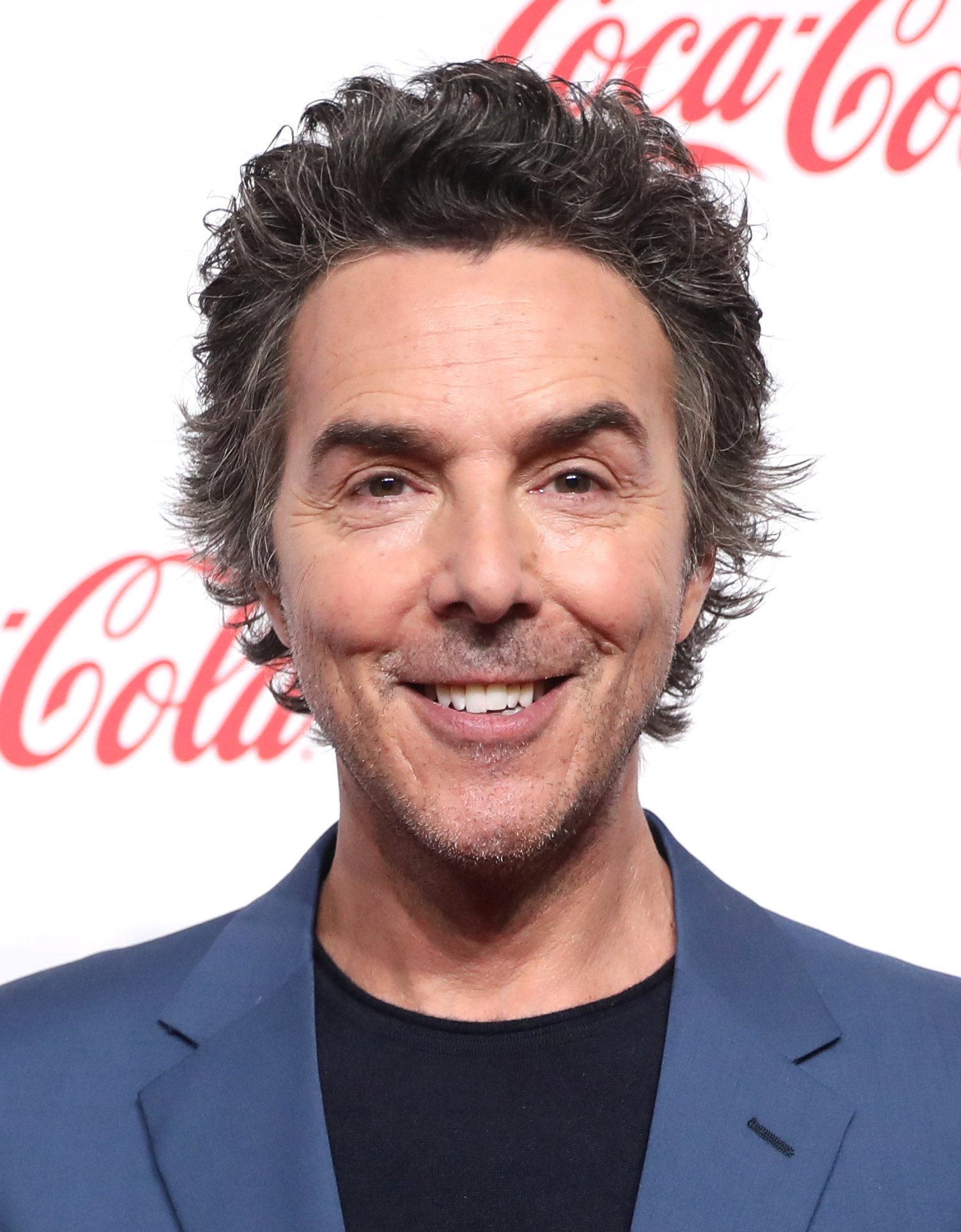
- Levy in 2024
- Born: Shawn Adam Levy; July 23, 1968 (age 58); Montreal, Quebec, Canada
- Citizenship: Canada; United States
- Education: Yale University (BA); University of Southern California (MFA)
- Occupations: Film director; film producer; screenwriter; actor
- Years active: 1986–present
- Spouse: Serena Levy (m. 1995)
- Children: 4

Shawn Adam Levy (/ˈliːvi/ LEE-vee; born July 23, 1968) is a Canadian and American filmmaker and actor. He is the founder of 21 Laps Entertainment.

Following early work as a television director, most notably for The Famous Jett Jackson, Levy gained recognition in the 2000s for directing comedy films like Big Fat Liar (2002), Just Married (2003), Cheaper by the Dozen (2003) and The Pink Panther (2006). He then found further success as the director of the first three films in the Night at the Museum film franchise (2006–14). In the early 2010s, he directed films including Date Night (2010), Real Steel (2011), and The Internship (2013), developed several comedy television pilots, and executive produced the first five seasons of the ABC sitcom Last Man Standing. Levy was a producer on the 2016 sci-fi film Arrival.

Levy was an executive producer through the entire run of the Netflix original series Stranger Things. He directed the third and fourth episodes of each of the show's first four seasons, as well as the sixth and seventh episodes of the final season. He also directed the Netflix limited series All the Light We Cannot See (2023) as well as additional films like, Free Guy (2021), The Adam Project (2022), and Deadpool & Wolverine (2024).

== Early life ==
Levy was born to a Jewish family with two siblings, Jodi and Debby, in Montreal, Quebec. As a teenager, he attended St. George's High School in Montreal and trained at the Stagedoor Manor Performing Arts Training Center in New York's Catskills. Pursuing a career in acting, he attended the performing arts program at Yale University, graduating in 1989; during his time there, he became interested in directing and moved to Los Angeles to study film directing. He received an MFA degree from the USC School of Cinematic Arts in 1994.

== Career ==
=== 1985–1994: Early career ===
Levy began his professional career while pursuing his undergraduate and graduate degrees in the mid-1980s through the mid-1990s. While studying performing arts, he made his acting debut in Zombie Nightmare (1987), a low-budget horror film in which he portrayed the character Jim Bratten, the leader of a group of teenagers. The film is best known for being featured in an episode of Mystery Science Theater 3000. He also appeared in the 1988 film Liberace: Behind the Music.

He pursued his MFA in production, during which time he continued to act with a guest spot on 21 Jump Street and a recurring role on Beverly Hills, 90210. Since this time, he has acted in primary small and cameo roles as well, like on 30 Rock as TV producer Scottie Shofar.

=== 1995–2014: Directorial career and 20th Century Fox ===
Through the end of the 1990s, Levy worked primarily as a television director of teen dramas, like Nickelodeon's The Secret World of Alex Mack and Animorphs. He was the primary director and executive producer (season 3) of the Disney Channel coming-of-age show The Famous Jett Jackson (1998–2002) and its companion film (2001).

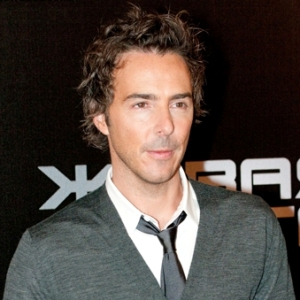
Levy in Moscow in 2011.

He made his feature film directorial debut in 1997 with the family films Address Unknown and Just in Time. This was followed by the 2002 teen comedy Big Fat Liar, his first theatrical release, and the 2003 rom com Just Married, which made more than $100 million in the box office. For the remainder of the decade, Levy worked successfully on big-budget family films, namely directing Cheaper by the Dozen (2003), The Pink Panther (2006), and Night at the Museum franchise (2006–2014)—and produced all of their sequel films. The first Night at the Museum film was Levy's most commercially successful project at the time, and one of the highest-grossing films of 2006. During this time he also produced the 2008 films What Happens in Vegas and The Rocker and executive produced The WB dramedy Pepper Dennis (2006).

Levy directed and produced the 2010 comedy Date Night starring Steve Carell and Tina Fey. The same year, he began directing the sci-fi drama Real Steel (2011), starring Hugh Jackman. Executive produced by Steven Spielberg, the film received mixed critical reviews and was nominated for the Academy Award for Best Visual Effects.

In the mid-2000s, Levy and his company 21 Laps signed a production deal with 20th Century Fox; it was renewed in 2010. Following this deal, Levy created a new television company with Marty Adelstein at 20th Century Fox TV to develop comedy series. Levy and 21 Laps were with the company until 2020. Since 2011, he has been the executive producer of the Tim Allen sitcom Last Man Standing. He also executive produced the short-lived ABC sitcoms Cristela (2014–2015) and Imaginary Mary (2017). Film projects with FOX include the 2012 Ben Stiller, Vince Vaughn, Jonah Hill comedy The Watch (directed by Akiva Schaffer), Levy's comedy The Internship (2013), Night at the Museum: Secret of the Tomb (2014), Why Him? (2016), and The Darkest Minds (2018).

Outside of 20th Century Fox, Levy worked to expand 21 Laps' range outside of primarily family-friendly comedies; this included producing the A24 drama The Spectacular Now (2013), the ensemble dramedy This Is Where I Leave You (2014), and the Academy Award-winning sci-fi film Arrival (2016). For his role in Arrival, Levy was nominated for an Academy Award for Best Picture.

=== 2015–present: Stranger Things and Netflix ===
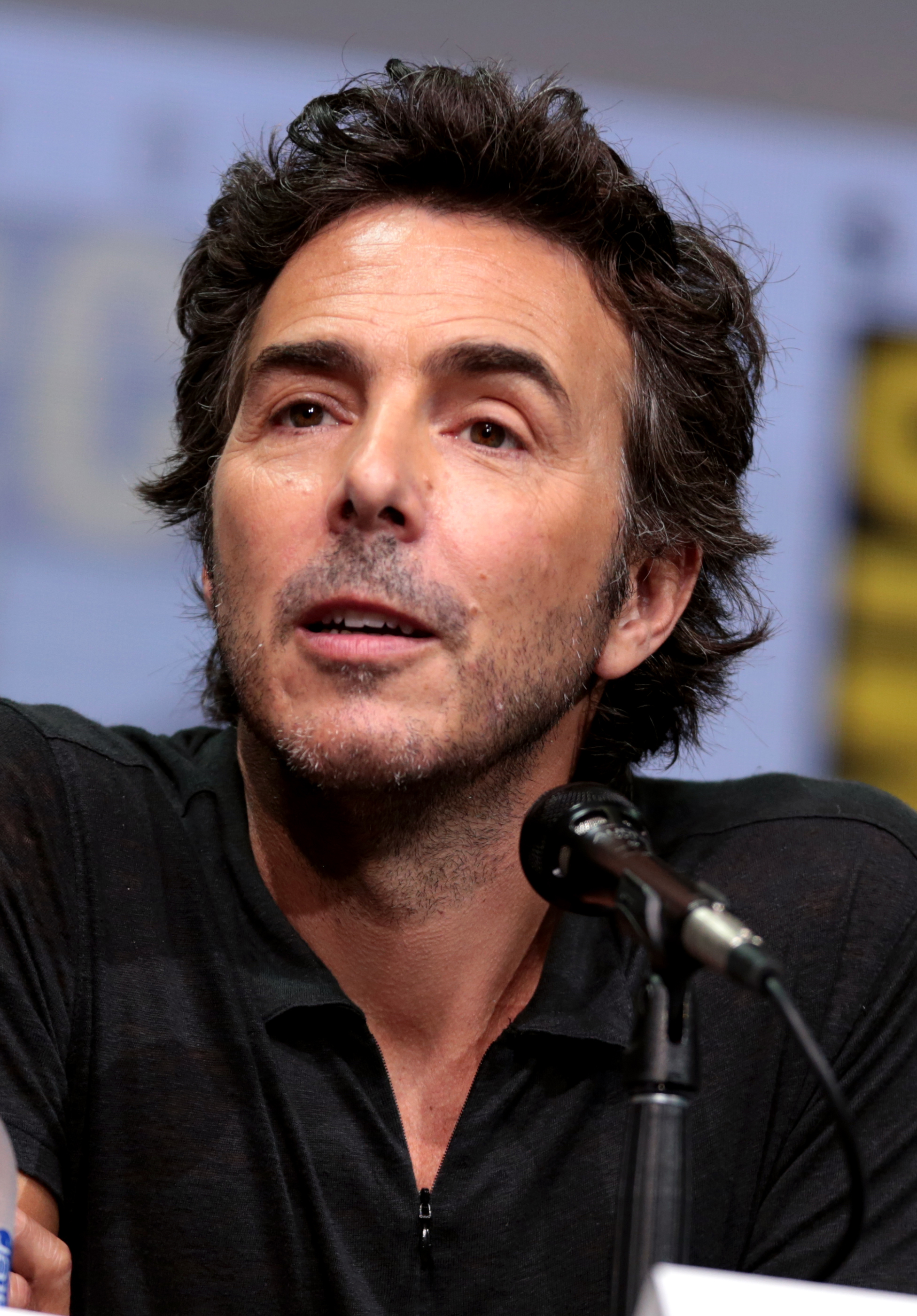
Levy promoting Stranger Things at the 2017 San Diego Comic-Con

In December 2017, Levy signed a four-year contract with Netflix to create TV projects exclusively for the streaming entertainment company. In 2020, 21 Laps extended its deal with Netflix and signed a first look deal.

In 2021, Levy produced the film adaptation of the slasher novel There's Someone Inside Your House by Stephanie Perkins under his 21 Laps Entertainment label, alongside James Wan's Atomic Monster studio for Netflix. Alongside Eric Heisserer, he also executive produced the 2021 Netflix series Shadow and Bone, an adaptation of the fantasy book series The Grisha Trilogy and the Six of Crows Duology starring Jessie Mei Li, under Netflix's deal with 21 Laps. Levy directed The Adam Project for Netflix starring Ryan Reynolds in the lead role.

Levy directed Deadpool & Wolverine for Marvel Studios. In November 2022, Levy entered talks to direct a Star Wars movie for Lucasfilm following the conclusion of his work on Deadpool & Wolverine and the fifth and final season of Stranger Things.

In February 2023, A24, who successfully bid on the Backrooms film, announced that work had begun on a film adaptation of the Backrooms based on Parsons' videos, with Parsons directing. Roberto Patino is set to write the screenplay, while Levy, James Wan, Michael Clear from Atomic Monster, Dan Cohen, and Dan Levine from 21 Laps Entertainment, Peter Chernin from Chernin Entertainment are set to produce.

In August 2023, Levy was the inaugural recipient of the Norman Jewison Award for career achievement at the TIFF Tribute Awards.

On April 17, 2025, Lucasfilm announced Star Wars: Starfighter, a film directed by Levy that stars Ryan Gosling and set to be released in theaters on May 28, 2027. It takes place five years after the events of Star Wars: The Rise of Skywalker. In June 2026, it was reported that Levy was attached to executive produce a television adaptation of the Japanese role-playing game series Persona for Netflix with his 21 Laps Entertainment partner Robert Atwood.

In July 2026, it was announced that Levy would direct a Ghost Rider movie for Marvel Studios, with Ryan Gosling playing the titular hero. Ghost Rider will be released in 2028.

== Personal life and activism ==
Levy has been married to his wife Serena since 1995. They have four daughters together; Sophie, Tess, Charlie, and Colette. He became a U.S. citizen in 2008. Following many years living in Los Angeles, the Levy family moved to Manhattan in the early 2020s. Since 2009, he has also maintained a family home in the Hudson Valley community of New Paltz, New York.

Levy was a signatory of "No Hostage Left Behind," a 2023 open letter espousing support for Israel in the Gaza war and asking US President Joe Biden to ensure the release of hostages kidnapped during the October 7 attacks.

== Filmography ==
=== Film ===
Key
†	Denotes films that have not yet been released

Year	Title	Director	Producer	Writer
1997	Address Unknown	Yes	No	No
1997	Just in Time	Yes	No	No
2002	Big Fat Liar	Yes	No	No
2003	Just Married	Yes	No	No
2003	Cheaper by the Dozen	Yes	No	No
2006	The Pink Panther	Yes	No	No
2006	Night at the Museum	Yes	Yes	No
2009	Night at the Museum: Battle of the Smithsonian	Yes	Yes	No
2010	Date Night	Yes	Yes	No
2011	Real Steel	Yes	Yes	No
2013	The Internship	Yes	Yes	No
2014	This Is Where I Leave You	Yes	Yes	No
2014	Night at the Museum: Secret of the Tomb	Yes	Yes	No
2021	Free Guy	Yes	Yes	No
2022	The Adam Project	Yes	Yes	No
2024	Deadpool & Wolverine	Yes	Yes	Yes
2027	Star Wars: Starfighter †	Yes	Yes	No
2028	Ghost Rider †	Yes	Yes	No

Producer only

Year	Title	Director	Notes
2001	I Saw Mommy Kissing Santa Claus	John Shepphird	
2005	Cheaper by the Dozen 2	Adam Shankman	
2008	What Happens in Vegas	Tom Vaughan	
2008	The Rocker	Peter Cattaneo	
2009	The Pink Panther 2	Harald Zwart	Executive producer
2012	The Watch	Akiva Schaffer	
2013	The Spectacular Now	James Ponsoldt	
2014	Alexander and the Terrible, Horrible, No Good, Very Bad Day	Miguel Arteta	
2016	Arrival	Denis Villeneuve	Nominated – Academy Award for Best Picture; Nominated – AACTA International Award for Best Film; Nominated – BAFTA Award for Best Film
2016	Why Him?	John Hamburg	
2017	Fist Fight	Richie Keen	
2017	Table 19	Jeffrey Blitz	
2018	The Darkest Minds	Jennifer Yuh Nelson	
2018	Kin	Jonathan Baker; Josh Baker	
2020	The Violent Heart	Kerem Sanga	
2020	Love and Monsters	Michael Matthews	
2021	There's Someone Inside Your House	Patrick Brice	
2022	Cheaper by the Dozen	Gail Lerner	Executive producer
2022	Rosaline	Karen Maine	
2022	Night at the Museum: Kahmunrah Rises Again	Matt Danner	
2023	Crater	Kyle Patrick Alvarez	
2023	The Boogeyman	Rob Savage	
2024	Never Let Go	Alexandre Aja	
2025	Alexander and the Terrible, Horrible, No Good, Very Bad Road Trip	Marvin Lemus	
2026	Backrooms	Kane Parsons	
2027	The Catch †	Dave McCary	
2027	Seasons †	Drew Hancock	
TBA	One Attempt Remaining †	Kay Cannon	

Acting credits

Year	Title	Role	Notes
1987	Wild Thing	Paul	
1987	Zombie Nightmare	Jim Batten	
1988	Liberace: Behind the Music	Glenn	
1988	The Kiss	Terry O'Connell	
1991	Our Shining Moment	J.J.	
1993	Made in America	Dwayne	
1997	Address Unknown		
1997	Just in Time	Photographer	
2002	Big Fat Liar	Wolf Party Guest	
2003	Cheaper by the Dozen	Press/Room Reporter	
2005	Cheaper by the Dozen 2	Hospital Intern	
2009	Night at the Museum: Battle of the Smithsonian	Guy in Commercial	
2013	The Internship	Guy in Nap Pod	
2021	All Too Well: The Short Film	Her Dad	Short film

=== Television ===
Year	Title	Director	Executive Producer	Notes
1996–1998	The Secret World of Alex Mack	Yes	No	6 episodes
1997–1998	The Journey of Allen Strange	Yes	No	3 episodes
1998–1999	Lassie	Yes	No	4 episodes
1998	First Wave	Yes	No	Episode: "Marker 262"
1998–1999	Animorphs	Yes	No	5 episodes
1998–2001	The Famous Jett Jackson	Yes	Yes	Directed 47 episodes
1999	So Weird	Yes	No	1 episode
2000	In a Heartbeat	Yes	No	2 episodes
2001	Jett Jackson: The Movie	Yes	Yes	TV movie
2002	Do Over	Yes	No	Episode: "The Block Party"
2002	Birds of Prey	Yes	No	Episode: "Nature of the Beast"
2006	Pepper Dennis	Yes	Yes	Directed pilot episode
2012	Family Trap	Yes	Yes	Unaired FOX pilot
2016	Unbreakable Kimmy Schmidt	Yes	No	Episode: "Kimmy Drives a Car!"
2016–2025	Stranger Things	Yes	Yes	Directed 10 episodes
2017	Imaginary Mary	Yes	Yes	Directed 2 episodes
2023	All the Light We Cannot See	Yes	Yes	Miniseries

Executive producer only

- Last Man Standing (2011–2016)
- Cristela (2014)
- I Am Not Okay with This (2020)
- Dash & Lily (2020)
- Unsolved Mysteries (2020)
- Shadow and Bone (2021–2023)
- Lost Ollie (2022)
- The Perfect Couple (2024)
- Stranger Things: Tales from '85 (2026)

Acting roles

Year	Title	Role	Notes
1989	China Beach	Lieutenant	Episode: "Dear China Beach"
1989–1990	Tour of Duty	SP4 Budd Sills	2 episodes
1990	21 Jump Street	Lance	Episode: "Awomp-Bomp-Aloobomb, Aloop Bamboom"
1990	Lifestories	Luke Conforti	Episode: "Art Conforti"
1993	Beverly Hills, 90210	Howard Banchek	2 episodes
1993	Step by Step	Daniel	Episode: "Way Off-Broadway"
2000	The Famous Jett Jackson	Producer	3 episodes
2009	30 Rock	Scottie Shofar	Episode: "The Problem Solvers"
2016	Stranger Things	Morgue Worker	Episode: "Chapter Four: The Body"

== Awards and nominations ==
Selected awards
Year	Ceremony	Award	Work	Result
2016	22nd Critics' Choice Awards	Best Drama Series	Stranger Things	Nominated
2017	74th Golden Globe Awards	Best Television Series – Drama	Stranger Things	Nominated
2017	28th Producers Guild of America Awards	Best Theatrical Motion Pictures	Arrival	Nominated
2017	28th Producers Guild of America Awards	Best Episodic Drama	Stranger Things	Won
2017	89th Academy Awards	Best Picture	Arrival	Nominated
2017	71st BAFTA Film Awards	Best Film	Arrival	Nominated
2017	2017 BAFTA Television Awards	Best International Programme	Stranger Things	Nominated
2017	69th Primetime Emmy Awards	Outstanding Drama Series	Stranger Things	Nominated
2018	75th Golden Globe Awards	Best Television Series – Drama	Stranger Things	Nominated
2018	29th Producers Guild of America Awards	Outstanding Producer of Episodic Television, Drama	Stranger Things	Nominated
2018	70th Primetime Emmy Awards	Outstanding Drama Series	Stranger Things	Nominated
2020	72nd Primetime Emmy Awards	Outstanding Drama Series	Stranger Things	Nominated
2024	76th Directors Guild of America Awards	Outstanding Directing – Miniseries or TV Film	All the Light We Cannot See	Nominated
2025	52nd Saturn Awards	Best Film Director	Deadpool & Wolverine	Nominated
2025	52nd Saturn Awards	Best Film Writing	Deadpool & Wolverine	Nominated
