= There's Someone Inside Your House =

Horror novel

- Author: Stephanie Perkins
- Language: English
- Genre: Horror; Thriller; Young adult
- Publisher: Dutton Books
- Publication date: September 12, 2017
- Publication place: United States
- Media type: Print (hardback and paperback); Audiobook; E-book
- Pages: 287
- ISBN: 978-0142424988

There's Someone Inside Your House is a horror novel by American author Stephanie Perkins, published on September 12, 2017, by Dutton Books. The novel's film adaptation, a slasher film of the same name, was directed by Patrick Brice, and was released on October 6, 2021 on Netflix.

== Synopsis ==
Makani Young is still adjusting to her new life in the small town of Osborne, Nebraska. It has been one year since the inciting incident that caused her parents to send her away from Hawaii to live with her grandmother in the rural town. Though Makani befriends a few friends named Alex and Darby and even flirts with a romantic interest named Ollie at Osborne High School, she is still haunted by the secrets of her past life. However, all of that is put to the side when the students at her school start getting killed in a series of gruesome murders. As the terror grows closer and the hunt intensifies for the killer, the dark secrets of the past will finally be revealed.

== Characters ==
- Makani Young – Main character of the novel and a new transfer senior student at Osborne High. She is a half Hawaiian and half African American who moves to Nebraska from Hawaii, a year before the story begins. Makani was forced to relocate following an incident that occurred in her Hawaiian hometown.
- Oliver "Ollie" Larsson – Nicknamed Ollie, he is a reclusive student at Osborne High and a romantic interest of Makani. He has a part-time job at Greeley's Foods. Osborne Police Department considered him one of the leading suspects behind the new murder cases at the town.
- Haley Whitehall – Osborne High's president of the drama club.
- Darby – A transgender student who attends Osborne High. He is one of Makani's school friends.
- Alexandra "Alex" Shimerda – Makani's goth friend and a student at Osborne High.
- Zachary Loup – Osborne High's resident burnout. He is infamously known to be quite abrasive to his friends and classmates at school.
- Grandma Young – Makani's maternal grandmother and legal guardian.
- Matt Butler – A popular football jock and student at Osborne High.
- Chris Larsson – Oliver’s brother and police officer at the Osborne PD.
- Caleb Greely – The son of Pastor Greely, a student at Osborne High as well as a weekend supervisor at Greeley's Foods.
- Jessica Boyd – Haley's understudy at the drama club and a student at Osborne High.
- Rodrigo Morales – Alex's romantic interest and a student at Osborne High.
- Lauren Dixon – Matt's girlfriend and a student at Osborne High.
- David Thurston Ware – Rodrigo's best friend and a student at Osborne High.
- Katie Kurtzman - Osborne High's student council president.
- Rosemarie Holt - An aspiring jockey and student at Osborne High.
- Buddy – Matt's best friend and a student at Osborne High.
- Brooke – Haley’s best friend and a student at Osborne High.
- Jonathan – The lead in the school production of Sweeney Todd and a student at Osborne High.
- Jasmine Oshiro - Makani's former best friend and a student at Kailua-Kona High, Makani's old school in Hawaii.
- Kayla Lum - A senior student at Kailua-Kona High.
- Gabrielle Cruz - A senior student as well as the captain of the swimming team at Kailua-Kona High.

== Reception ==
MJ Franklin of Mashable praised the novel, stating that it is a great homage to "classic slasher movies like Scream and I Know What You Did Last Summer". Christina Ledbetter from The Washington Times praised the book, mentioning that the elements of "teen romance and grisly murders crawl into the backseat of the car for a make-out session, producing a read that is as eerie as it is delightful." Booklist stated in a positive review of the book that it is a "clever—and, to fans, no doubt surprising—foray into the teen slasher genre."

== Film adaptation ==
In March 2018, Deadline reported that Netflix had partnered with 21 Laps Entertainment and Atomic Monster to adapt the novel into a film. After an official announcement, it was confirmed that Shawn Levy, James Wan, Dan Cohen and Michael Clear would serve as producers on the film. In March 2019, it was announced that Patrick Brice would direct, from a screenplay by Henry Gayden. In August 2019, Sydney Park, Théodore Pellerin, Asjha Cooper, Dale Whibley, Jesse LaTourette, Burkely Duffield, and Diego Josef were set to star in the film. Initially expected to be released on Netflix in February 2021, the film was later delayed to October 6, 2021.
