= Gayden =

Gayden is an English surname. Notable people with the surname include:

- Henry Gayden (born 1979), American screenwriter
- Mac Gayden (1941–2025), American rock and country singer, songwriter, and record producer
