= Patrick Brice =

American film director

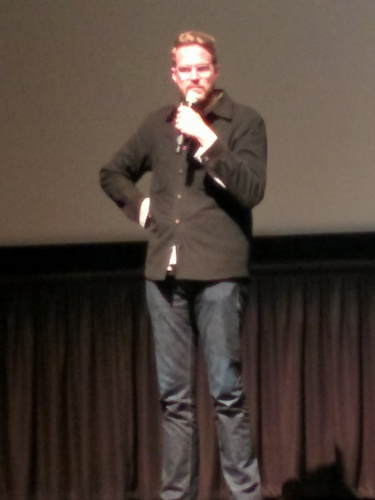
- Brice in 2015
- Born: Donat Patrick Kack-Brice; April 23, 1983 (age 43); Grass Valley, California, U.S.
- Occupations: Film director, screenwriter, cinematographer, actor

Donat Patrick Kack-Brice (born April 23, 1983), known professionally as Patrick Brice, is an American film director, actor, screenwriter and cinematographer. He is known for directing Creep (2014), The Overnight (2015), Creep 2 (2017), Corporate Animals (2019) and There's Someone Inside Your House (2021).

== Career ==
Brice was born and raised in Grass Valley, California. He graduated with a BFA from California Institute of the Arts (CalArts) School of Film & Video. Creep, his first feature-film as director/writer/actor (co-starring Mark Duplass), was produced by Blumhouse Productions: it premiered at SXSW 2014 and was released through Netflix. His second feature as director/writer, The Overnight (with Adam Scott, Taylor Schilling and Jason Schwartzman) premiered at the 2015 Sundance Film Festival and was released by The Orchard. He wrote and directed Creep 2, starring Duplass and Desiree Akhavan: it was released in 2017 through Netflix. His latest film as director, Corporate Animals, starring Ed Helms and Demi Moore, premiered at the 2019 Sundance Film Festival.

In March 2019 it was announced that Brice would direct the Netflix slasher film There's Someone Inside Your House, an adaptation of the 2017 novel of the same name by Stephanie Perkins, with Henry Gayden writing the script. It was produced by 21 Laps Entertainment and Atomic Monster. The film was released on October 6, 2021.

In July 2020, it was announced that Brice would develop, write and direct a film adaptation for HBO Max based on Owen Laukkanen's suspense thriller novel titled The Wild.

== Filmography ==
Film

Year	Title	Director	Writer	Notes
2014	Creep	Yes	Yes	Also cinematographer and actor
2015	The Overnight	Yes	Yes	
2015	Hang Loose	Yes	Yes	Co-directed with Sammy Harkham
2017	Creep 2	Yes	Yes	Also cinematographer and actor
2019	Corporate Animals	Yes	No	
2021	There's Someone Inside Your House	Yes	No	

Television

Year	Title	Director	Writer	Notes
2017–2019	Room 104	Yes	Yes	Directed episodes: "Pizza Boy", "Hungry", "Itchy", "Crossroads", "No Dice"; Wrote and directed episode: "Animal for Sale"
2024–present	The Creep Tapes	Yes	Yes	Directed all 18 episodes across 3 seasons
