= James Wan =

Malaysian-born Australian filmmaker (born 1977)

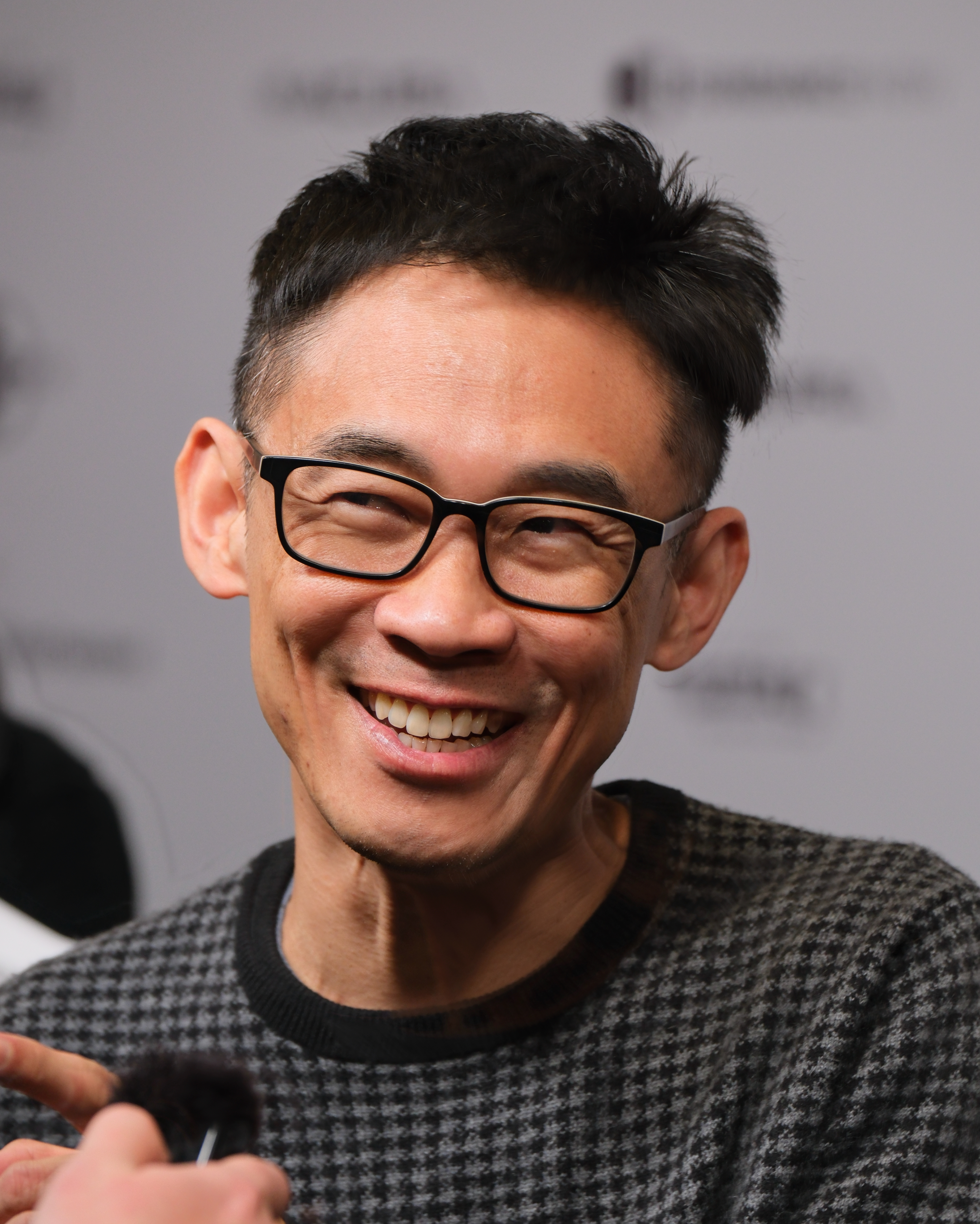
- Wan at the Sundance Film Festival 2026
- Born: 26 February 1977 (age 49); Kuching, Sarawak, Malaysia
- Education: Royal Melbourne Institute of Technology (BA)
- Occupations: Film director; screenwriter; film producer; film editor; comic book writer
- Years active: 1998–present
- Spouse: Ingrid Bisu (m. 2019)

Chinese name
- Traditional Chinese: 溫子仁
- Simplified Chinese: 温子仁
Transcriptions
Standard Mandarin
- Hanyu Pinyin: Wēn Zǐrén
Yue: Cantonese
- Yale Romanization: Wan Tsz Yan
- Jyutping: Wan1 Zi2 Jan4
Southern Min
- Hokkien POJ: Un Chú-jîn

James Wan (born 26 February 1977) is a Malaysian-born Australian filmmaker. He has primarily worked in the horror genre as the co-creator of the Saw and Insidious franchises and the creator of The Conjuring Universe, the highest-grossing horror franchise at over $2.9 billion. Wan is also the founder of film and television production company Atomic Monster.

Wan made his feature directorial debut with Saw in 2004. The Saw franchise became commercially successful and grossed more than $1 billion globally. Following a period of setbacks, Wan found new success with the Insidious series, in which he directed the first film in 2010 and its 2013 sequel. The same year as the second Insidious, Wan directed the first Conjuring film to critical and commercial success. He served as the director of the second installment in 2016 and produced subsequent films in the franchise.

Outside of horror, Wan directed Furious 7 (2015), the seventh installment of the Fast & Furious franchise, and the DC Extended Universe superhero films Aquaman (2018) and its sequel Aquaman and the Lost Kingdom (2023). Both Furious 7 and Aquaman grossed over $1 billion, making Wan the eighth director with two films to reach the milestone. He is the 17th highest-grossing director of all time as of 2026, with his films having grossed over $4.1 billion worldwide.

== Early life and education ==
James Wan was born on 26 February 1977 in Kuching, Sarawak, Malaysia, to Chinese-Malaysian parents. Wan and his family moved to Perth, Western Australia when he was seven. Wan attended West Leederville Primary School followed by Willetton Senior High School in Perth, and then Lake Tuggeranong College in Canberra. Wan then relocated to Melbourne where he attended the Royal Melbourne Institute of Technology (RMIT). He graduated from RMIT with a Bachelor of Arts in media in 1999.

== Career ==
=== 2004–2006: Debut ===
Prior to 2003, Wan and his friend, fellow filmmaker Leigh Whannell, had begun writing a script for a horror film, citing their dreams and fears as inspiration for its plot. Upon completing the script, Wan and Whannell had wanted to select an excerpt from their script, later to be known as Saw and film it to pitch their film to studios. With the help of Charlie Clouser, who had composed the score for the film, and a few stand-in actors, Wan and Whannell shot the film with a relatively low budget. Whannell also decided to star in the film as Adam Stanheight, one of the film's main protagonists.

After the release of the full-length Saw, the film was met with overwhelming success in the box office both domestically and internationally. The film ended up grossing $55 million in America, and $48 million in other countries, totaling over US$103 million worldwide. This was over $100 million more than the production budget. This led the studio to green-light the sequel Saw II and later the rest of the Saw franchise. Since its inception, the Saw films have become the highest grossing horror franchise of all time worldwide in unadjusted dollars. In the United States alone, Saw is the second highest grossing horror franchise, behind only the Friday the 13th films by a margin of $10 million. Wan directed Saw (2004) and co-wrote Saw III (2006). Meanwhile, he and Whannell have predominantly served as executive producers to the sequels Saw II, Saw III, Saw IV, Saw V, Saw VI, Saw 3D, Jigsaw, Spiral and Saw X.

=== 2007–2009: Professional setbacks ===
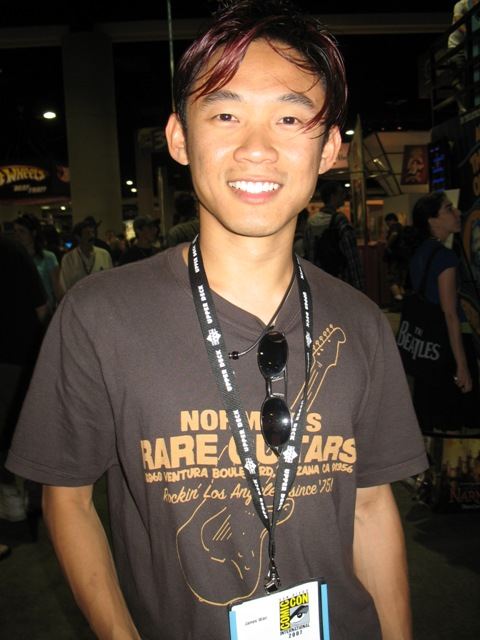
Wan at 2007 San Diego Comic-Con

In 2007, Wan directed two featured films. The first was the horror film Dead Silence, which was the result of advice from Wan and Whannell's agent at the time; Wan and Whannell have since stated that the film was a negative experience for them. Dead Silence featured Australian actor Ryan Kwanten and is based on the premise of a legend, whereby the ghost of a ventriloquist, Mary Shaw, removes the tongue of any person who screams in its presence. Rather than a gore movie, Wan described the film as "a creepy doll movie. It's in the spirit of those old Twilight Zone episodes or Hammer Horror Films. Very old-school." The film grossed over $22 million against a production budget of $20 million. It received negative reviews from critics.

Wan's second directorial film of 2007 was the vigilante action drama film Death Sentence, a film adapted from the 1975 novel of the same name by Brian Garfield that was written as the sequel to Death Wish. The film's protagonist (Kevin Bacon) was a father seeking revenge for his murdered son, who was killed by a local gang. Whannell played a minor character as one of the gang members. Wan described the film as "a raw and gritty, 70s styled revenge thriller ... It's my arthouse movie with guns." The film grossed $17 million against a production budget of $10 million. Similar to Wan's previous film, it received negative reviews. Author Garfield later stated, "I think that, except for its ludicrous violence toward the end, the Death Sentence movie does depict its character's decline and the stupidity of vengeful vigilantism," adding, "As a story it made the point I wanted it to make." Dead Silence and Death Sentence are Wan's first films to be distributed by U.S. major film studios, with Dead Silence being distributed by Universal Pictures and Death Sentence being distributed by 20th Century Fox.

Having worked on his previous three films continuously, Wan told the male lifestyle website CraveOnline that he was ready for "a bit of time off just to chill... but at the same time I'm using this opportunity to write again." In 2008, Wan directed a trailer for the survival horror video game Dead Space. During this time, Wan and Tobe Hooper were in talks to revive the Texas Chainsaw Massacre series with a trilogy of films, with both planning to direct although the studio instead made 2013's Texas Chainsaw 3D.

=== 2010–2013: Career resurgence ===
Wan returned to the horror genre with the film Insidious, which premiered at the 2010 Toronto International Film Festival as part of the "Midnight Madness" program and was sold to Sony Pictures Worldwide for a seven-figure sum within four hours of the premiere's conclusion. Insidious began its American theatrical release in the first weekend of April 2011 and achieved third place at the box office, with an estimated US$13.5 million in ticket sales. Starring Patrick Wilson, Rose Byrne and Barbara Hershey, the film was made independently, as Wan sought complete creative control and also wanted to make a film that was markedly different from the gore that he had become synonymous with due to Saw. Wan stated in an interview, "the fact that Insidious was not being run by a committee really afforded me the luxury to make a film with lots of creepy, bizarre moments that a studio might not 'get.'" Wan later revealed that he wanted to "experiment in other genres, or make films in other genres because I love, Leigh and I have, we're not just horror fans. We're film fans. I love action films. I want to do action films. I want to do romantic comedies. I love all this stuff. So, if I find the good material, I'll do it.

Wan's next film, The Conjuring (2013), centered on the real life exploits of husband and wife Ed and Lorraine Warren, a married couple that investigated paranormal events. The film focused on the couple's most famous case second to the Amityville haunting, in which they investigated a witch's curse on a Rhode Island family farm. In his second collaboration with the pair, Patrick Wilson starred in the film, with him and Vera Farmiga playing the husband and wife respectively. Filming commenced in North Carolina, United States, in late February 2012 and New Line Cinema, together with Warner Bros. Pictures, had initially slated the film for a release on 25 January 2013. A test screening of the film occurred in October 2012 at the New York Comic Con event, where it screened in the IGN Theater, and the audience feedback was overwhelmingly positive. At that stage, Wan had several more weeks before the film was completed. The film was released in July 2013 and was a critical and commercial success, grossing $319.5 million.

After work on The Conjuring was complete, Wan directed a sequel to 2010's Insidious. The film was once again written by Wan's longtime collaborator and close friend, Whannell, and the cast of the original film returned. Filming for the sequel commenced in January 2013 and the film was released on 13 September 2013. The budget for the film had been described as "shoestring" by one media outlet. Oren Peli, the creator of the Paranormal Activity franchise, returned as an executive producer. Film District distributed Insidious: Chapter 2. It received mixed reviews but grossed over $161 million worldwide against a budget of $5 million. Wan later admitted that he wasn't as involved in the sequel, adding "it would be good to shepherd it and keep it more in track to the version I had when I made the first film so that it doesn't detour too far" since he never intended to make a sequel initially.

=== 2014–present: Professional expansion, Atomic Monster and blockbuster films ===
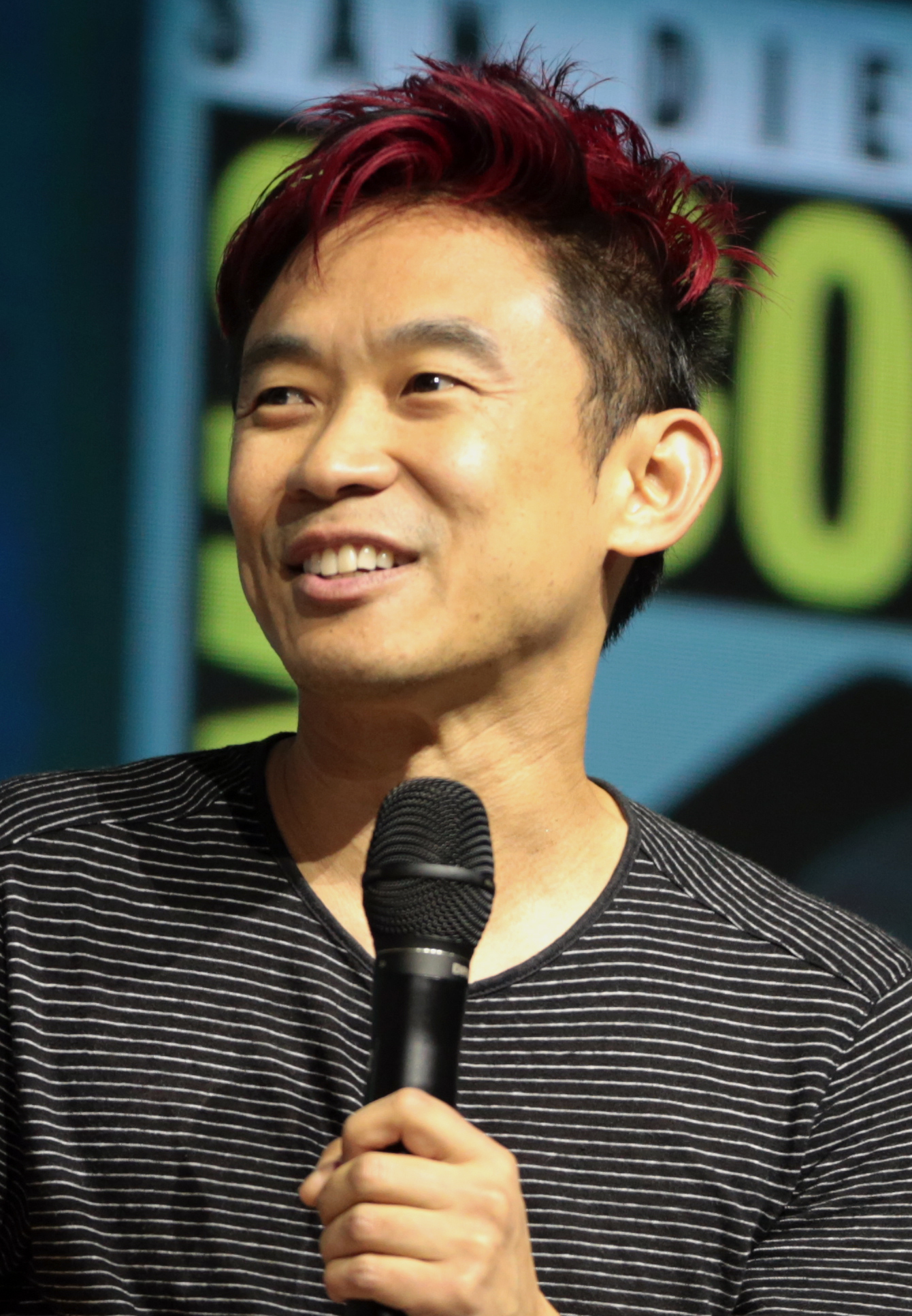
Wan at the 2018 San Diego Comic-Con

In early 2013, Wan entered into negotiations with Universal Pictures to direct the seventh installment to Fast & Furious action franchise after Justin Lin, who directed the previous four sequels, confirmed that he would not continue as director in January 2013. Wan was part of a directorial shortlist alongside Jeff Wadlow, Baltasar Kormákur and Harald Zwart. A final confirmation that Wan would direct was revealed in April 2013, with Lin approving. The film, Furious 7, was released in April 2015. It became the most commercially successful film in the franchise, grossing over $1.516 billion globally and received positive reviews.

Wan later completed a deal to direct The Conjuring 2 as part of a significant long-term deal with New Line Cinema. Head of New Line, Toby Emmerich, explained that Wan is the sole director that the studio signed a deal with, as New Line considers Wan to be "a class of one". The film was released on June 10, 2016, to high critical acclaim and commercial success. That same month, Wan launched his own production company, Atomic Monster, at New Line Cinema. With the company, he develops and produces budget films in the science fiction, horror, and comedy genres. Films produced by the label included The Conjuring 2 and Lights Out.

Wan later produced Demonic, a Dimension Films horror movie that was scheduled for a December 2014 release, alongside Lee Clay. Wan conceived the idea for the film, which was directed by Will Canon and features Maria Bello in the lead role. Max La Bella penned the script. The film was eventually released on VOD in August 2017.

He then produced Annabelle, a spin-off of The Conjuring that served as a prequel to the 2013 film. The spin-off was profitable, made on a budget of $6.5 million and grossing over $256 million As part of the franchise, he also produced the prequel film Annabelle: Creation (2017), another Conjuring spin-off horror film,The Nun (2018), and Annabelle Comes Home (2019). Wan co-wrote The Nun and Annabelle Comes Home with Gary Dauberman.

In 2018, Wan directed the DC Extended Universe superhero film Aquaman. The film grossed over $1.148 billion worldwide, becoming the highest-grossing DCEU film as well as the highest-grossing film based on a DC Comics character, internationally, surpassing The Dark Knight Rises. In 2019, Wan developed a television series based on the character Swamp Thing, for the DC Universe streaming service.

On 7 August 2015, Wan signed-on to produce New Line Cinema's 2021 Mortal Kombat reboot. Four years later, the South Australian Government's budget included a huge boost to the South Australian Film Corporation, with the Mortal Kombat reboot, as the largest film production in the state's history, set to be a key recipient. In February 2018, Wan was confirmed to executive produce the animated adaptation of Stan Sakai's Usagi Yojimbo comic book series. The animated series premiered on Netflix in 2022 and was titled Samurai Rabbit: The Usagi Chronicles. In 2021, Wan directed the horror film Malignant, starring Annabelle Wallis and co-produced the film adaptation of the slasher novel There's Someone Inside Your House by Stephanie Perkins, under his Atomic Monster label, alongside Shawn Levy's 21 Laps Entertainment for Netflix. Also in 2021, Wan executive produced the television adaptation of I Know What You Did Last Summer for Amazon Prime.

On November 16, 2022, it was announced that Wan's production company Atomic Monster was in talks to merge with Jason Blum's Blumhouse Productions with the company having a shared first look deal with Universal Pictures. Both companies would continue to operate as separate labels, with each maintaining its own creative autonomy and brand identity.

In February 2023, A24 announced that work had begun on a film adaptation of the Backrooms based on KaneParsons' videos, with Parsons directing. Wan, alongside Michael Clear from Atomic Monster, Shawn Levy, Dan Cohen, and Dan Levine from 21 Laps Entertainment, Peter Chernin from Chernin Entertainment, and Osgood Perkins produced the film. The film released in May 2026.

=== Future projects ===
In 2018, The Hollywood Reporter reported that Wan and producers Roy Lee and Larry Sanitsky were developing a film adaptation of the Stephen King novel The Tommyknockers and shopping the package to studios. Deadline later reported that Universal had won the bidding war and acquired the feature film package. Wan will produce the film adaptation under his Atomic Monster label, with an eye to direct.

In March 2020, Wan was announced to be working with Universal Pictures to produce a modern remake of Frankenstein.

Wan is also attached to a television series based on the Italian horror comics series Dylan Dog, which was announced in October 2019. In December 2022, he stated that the series was still in development, and that he was also working with the publishing house to find investors.

Wan will produce the horror film Border Patrol with Screen Gems, with Johannes Roberts directing the movie.

In October 2023, Disney Branded Television announced a Gargoyles live-action reboot with Wan and Michael Clear, joining the executive producing ranks.

It was announced in March 2026 that Wan would direct and produce an English adaptation of The Gangster, the Cop, the Devil for Paramount Pictures, starring Ma Dong-seok.

== Unreleased projects ==
In 2009, a Whannell–Wan collaborative project, called X Ray, was announced and was described as a new "film noir/action project," with producer Robbie Brenner also attached to the project, however as of December 2012, no further developments were reported. It was also announced that an adaptation of Scott O. Brown's graphic novel Nightfall was to be Wan's next film after Death Sentence. The plot involves the events that take place after a criminal is sent to a Texas prison run by vampires. However, nothing materialised and Wan lost the rights to the film.

In 2012, Disney was reported to be developing a remake of The Rocketeer and Wan was in talks about directing the film. However, no film ever came to fruition. Similarly, Wan's negotiations to direct an adaption of the 1980s television series MacGyver film never materialised and he pulled out from directing due to scheduling conflicts. Instead, a reboot television series titled MacGyver premiered in September 2016. Wan executive produced the series and directed the pilot episode. Wan was also at one point attached to the director role for a live action Robotech film for Sony, but was replaced by Andy Muschietti in July 2017.

A "horror-tinged" spin-off of Aquaman called The Trench was in development. Wan would have produced while Noah Gardner and Aidan Fitzgerald were signed on to write the script. It was cancelled in April 2021.

== Personal life ==
On 22 June 2019, Wan became engaged to Romanian actress Ingrid Bisu, making the announcement on his Instagram account. They married on 4 November 2019.

== Filmography ==
Key
†	Denotes films that have not yet been released

=== Feature film ===
Director

Year	Title	Director	Writer	Producer	Notes
1998	Stygian	Yes	Yes	No	Co-directed with Shannon Young; festival screenings only, never commercially released
2004	Saw	Yes	Story	No	
2007	Dead Silence	Yes	Story	No	
2007	Death Sentence	Yes	No	No	
2010	Insidious	Yes	No	No	Also editor
2013	The Conjuring	Yes	No	No	
2013	Insidious: Chapter 2	Yes	Story	No	
2015	Furious 7	Yes	No	No	
2016	The Conjuring 2	Yes	Yes	Yes	
2018	Aquaman	Yes	Story	No	
2021	Malignant	Yes	Story	Yes	
2023	Aquaman and the Lost Kingdom	Yes	Story	Yes	

Producer/Writer

Year	Title	Story	Producer	Notes
2014	Annabelle	No	Yes	
2015	Demonic	No	Yes	
2015	Insidious: Chapter 3	No	Yes	Also makes a cameo as "Theater Director"
2016	Lights Out	No	Yes	
2017	Annabelle: Creation	No	Yes	
2018	Insidious: The Last Key	No	Yes	
2018	The Nun	Yes	Yes	Also second unit director
2019	The Curse of La Llorona	No	Yes	
2019	Annabelle Comes Home	Yes	Yes	
2021	Mortal Kombat	No	Yes	
2021	The Conjuring: The Devil Made Me Do It	Yes	Yes	
2021	There's Someone Inside Your House	No	Yes	
2022	M3GAN	Yes	Yes	
2023	Insidious: The Red Door	No	Yes	
2023	The Nun II	No	Yes	
2024	Night Swim	No	Yes	
2024	'Salem's Lot	No	Yes	
2025	The Monkey	No	Yes	
2025	M3GAN 2.0	No	Yes	
2025	The Conjuring: Last Rites	Yes	Yes	Also makes a cameo as "Wedding Guest"
2026	Lee Cronin's The Mummy	No	Yes	
2026	Mortal Kombat II	No	Yes	
2026	Backrooms	No	Yes	
2026	Soulm8te	Yes	Yes	
2026	Insidious: Out of the Further	No	Yes	
2026	Other Mommy	No	Yes	
2027	The Revenge of La Llorona †	No	Yes	Post-production
2027	Paranormal Activity †	No	Yes	Post-production
2027	Seasons †	No	Yes	Post-production

Executive producer

- Saw II (2005)
- Saw III (2006) (Also story writer)
- Saw IV (2007)
- Saw V (2008)
- Saw VI (2009)
- Saw 3D (2010)
- Jigsaw (2017)
- Spiral: From the Book of Saw (2021)
- Saw X (2023)

=== Short film ===
Year	Title	Director	Writer	Editor	Notes
2003	Saw	Yes	Yes	Yes	Retroactively referred to as Saw 0.5
2008	Doggie Heaven	Yes	Creator	Yes	Produced for Xbox Live as part of their "Masters of Horror Take On Comedy" series; alternative title "Woof!"

=== Television ===
Year	Title			
Year	Title	Director	Executive Producer	Notes
2016–2021	MacGyver	Yes	Yes	Directed episode "The Rising"
2019	Swamp Thing	No	Yes	
2021	Aquaman: King of Atlantis	No	Yes	
2021	I Know What You Did Last Summer	No	Yes	
2022	Archive 81	No	Yes	
2022	Samurai Rabbit: The Usagi Chronicles	No	Yes	
2024	Teacup	No	Yes	
2025	True Haunting	No	Yes	Documentary series
2025	The Copenhagen Test	No	Yes	
2026	56 Days	No	Yes	

== Reception ==
Critical, public and commercial reception to films James Wan has directed:

Year	Film	Rotten Tomatoes	Metacritic	CinemaScore	Budget	Box office
2004	Saw	50% (194 reviews)	46 (32 reviews)	C+	$1.2 million	$104 million
2007	Dead Silence	22% (85 reviews)	34 (15 reviews)	C+	$20 million	$22.4 million
2007	Death Sentence	21% (112 reviews)	36 (24 reviews)	C	$20 million	$17 million
2010	Insidious	66% (175 reviews)	52 (30 reviews)	B	$1.5 million	$100.1 million
2013	The Conjuring	86% (227 reviews)	68 (35 reviews)	A–	$20 million	$321.3 million
2013	Insidious: Chapter 2	38% (129 reviews)	40 (30 reviews)	B+	$5 million	$161.9 million
2015	Furious 7	81% (279 reviews)	67 (50 reviews)	A	$190 million	$1.515 billion
2016	The Conjuring 2	80% (253 reviews)	65 (38 reviews)	A–	$40 million	$322.8 million
2018	Aquaman	66% (412 reviews)	55 (50 reviews)	A–	$160 million	$1.152 billion
2021	Malignant	77% (179 reviews)	51 (23 reviews)	C	$40 million	$34.9 million
2023	Aquaman and the Lost Kingdom	33% (213 reviews)	42 (43 reviews)	B	$205 million	$440.2 million

== Awards and nominations ==
Award	Year	Nominated work	Category	Result	Ref.
Saturn Awards	2019	Aquaman	Best Director	Nominated	
Tony Awards	2025	Death Becomes Her	Best Musical	Nominated	
