= True Haunting (TV series) =

American paranormal documentary series

- Genre: Paranormal; Supernatural horror; Documentary
- Country of origin: United States
- Original language: English
- No. of seasons: 1
- No. of episodes: 5

Production
- Executive producers: James Wan; Simon Allen; Mark Lewis; Lindsay Shapero; Scott Stewart; Michael Clear; Rob Hackett
- Running time: 34–39 minutes
- Production companies: Raw TV; Atomic Monster

Original release
- Network: Netflix
- Release: October 7, 2025

True Haunting is an American paranormal documentary television series. The series is executive produced by James Wan for Netflix. The series premiered on October 7, 2025.

== Premise ==
Paranormal encounters from the viewpoint of those who lived them are detailed through immersive reenactments and present-day interviews.

== Episodes ==
No.	Title	Directed by	Original release date	Prod. code
Eerie Hall
1	"Eerie Hall: Part 1"	Neil Rawles	October 7, 2025	1THA01
Geneseo college 1984. Avid runner Chris Di Cesare is keen to start his freshman year until strange voices and inexplicable feelings of dread set in.
2	"Eerie Hall: Part 2"	Neil Rawles	October 7, 2025	1THA02
As Chris becomes increasingly isolated, a friend urges him to try communicating with the entity that haunts him. But his waking nightmares only worsen.
3	"Eerie Hall: Part 3"	Neil Rawles	October 7, 2025	1THA03
Rumors fly after a friend's harrowing encounter. After making an ominous discovery while running with his dad, Chris decides to face the force alone.
This House Murdered Me
4	"This House Murdered Me: Part 1"	Luke Watson	October 7, 2025	1THA04
Eager to start fresh, a young family moves into a dreamy Victorian-style mansion. But the fixer-upper soon becomes costly and deeply disturbing.
5	"This House Murdered Me: Part 2"	Luke Watson	October 7, 2025	1THA05
From burning sage to hiring paranormal investigators, April and Matt fight for the house. Can they face its horrifying history and win their home back?

== Release ==
The five-episode series premiered on Netflix on October 7, 2025.

== Reception ==
On the review aggregator website Rotten Tomatoes, the series holds an approval rating of 67% based on 6 reviews.
