= The Overnight =

2015 film by Patrick Brice

- Theatrical release poster
- Directed by: Patrick Brice
- Written by: Patrick Brice
- Produced by: Naomi Scott
- Starring: Adam Scott; Jason Schwartzman; Taylor Schilling; Judith Godrèche
- Cinematography: John Guleserian
- Edited by: Christopher Donlon
- Music by: Julian Wass
- Production companies: Duplass Brothers Productions; Gettin' Rad Productions
- Distributed by: The Orchard
- Release dates: January 23, 2015 (Sundance); June 19, 2015 (United States)
- Running time: 79 minutes
- Country: United States
- Language: English
- Budget: $200,000
- Box office: $1.1 million

The Overnight is a 2015 American sex comedy film written and directed by Patrick Brice, and starring Adam Scott, Taylor Schilling, Jason Schwartzman, and Judith Godrèche. The film was produced by Naomi Scott and executive produced by Mark Duplass, Jay Duplass, and Adam Scott.

The film had its world premiere at the 2015 Sundance Film Festival on January 23, 2015. It was then released in a limited release on June 19, 2015, by The Orchard.

== Plot ==
Newcomers to Los Angeles Alex and Emily think they have found new friends when Kurt and Charlotte, an eccentric couple, invite them over to their house for a playdate between their sons.

After the children fall asleep, Kurt and Charlotte introduce a bong and the four adults get high. Soon after they get in the pool and Kurt insists on skinny dipping, which Alex is very hesitant to do for fear of exposing his small penis.

Emily joins Charlotte on an errand to pick up more alcohol, but Charlotte stops off at a massage parlor, where she gives a man a handjob while Emily watches through a peephole.

Back at the house, Emily warns Alex that Kurt and Charlotte are swingers. Alex and Emily argue about their sex life before Kurt reveals that he is sexually attracted to Alex. Slowly, the four adults begin to engage in an orgy, but their children burst into the room, the morning having arrived.

Days later, Alex and Emily run into Kurt, Charlotte and their son at the park, and share an amiable exchange.

== Cast ==
- Adam Scott as Alex
- Taylor Schilling as Emily
- Jason Schwartzman as Kurt
- Judith Godrèche as Charlotte
- RJ Hermes as RJ
- Max Moritt as Max

== Release ==
The film had its world premiere at the 2015 Sundance Film Festival on January 23, 2015, with North American distribution rights bought by The Orchard. The film screened at SXSW, on March 14, 2015, the Tribeca Film Festival, on April 21, 2015, as well as at the Florida Film Festival, The Independent Boston Film Festival, the Seattle International Film Festival, the deadCENTER Film Festival, the Los Angeles Film Festival, the Edinburgh International Film Festival, and the Nantucket Film Festival.

The film opened in a limited release in the United States on June 19, 2015, and opened in the United Kingdom on June 26, 2015.

=== Home media ===
The film was released on video on demand on September 8, 2015, and on DVD on September 15, 2015.

== Critical reception ==
On Rotten Tomatoes, the film received an 83% rating, based on 132 reviews, with an average rating of 6.9/10. The site's consensus states: "Witty and unpredictable, The Overnight benefits from writer-director Patrick Brice's sure-handed touch and strong performances from a talented cast." On Metacritic, the film has a score of 65 out of 100, based on 32 critics.

Indiewire's Katie Walsh praised the film, describing it as "hysterically funny" and giving it a B+ grade.
