= There's Someone Inside Your House (film) =

2021 American slasher film by Patrick Brice

- Promotional release poster
- Directed by: Patrick Brice
- Screenplay by: Henry Gayden
- Based on: There's Someone Inside Your House by Stephanie Perkins
- Produced by: Shawn Levy; Dan Cohen; James Wan; Michael Clear
- Starring: Sydney Park; Théodore Pellerin; Asjha Cooper; Jesse LaTourette; Diego Josef
- Cinematography: Jeff Cutter
- Edited by: Michel Aller
- Music by: Zachary Dawes
- Production companies: 21 Laps Entertainment; Atomic Monster
- Distributed by: Netflix
- Release dates: September 23, 2021 (Fantastic Fest); October 6, 2021 (United States)
- Running time: 96 minutes
- Country: United States
- Language: English

There's Someone Inside Your House is a 2021 American slasher film directed by Patrick Brice and adapted by Henry Gayden. It is an adaptation of the 2017 novel of the same name by Stephanie Perkins and stars Sydney Park, Théodore Pellerin, Asjha Cooper, Jesse LaTourette, and Diego Josef. The plot follows Makani Young (Park), a senior transfer student from Hawaii who finds herself in the center of gruesome murder cases in her newly acquainted town of Osborne, Nebraska.

There's Someone Inside Your House was announced in March 2018, with Shawn Levy and James Wan producing through their respective production banners 21 Laps and Atomic Monster, for Netflix. Principal photography took place the following year in Vancouver with cinematographer Jeff Cutter; additional filming concluded in August 2020. During post-production, editing was completed by Michel Aller and the musical score was composed by Zachary Dawes.

There's Someone Inside Your House premiered at Fantastic Fest on September 23, 2021, and was released on Netflix on October 6, 2021. It received mixed reviews from critics.

== Plot ==
In the fictional town of Osborne, Nebraska, high school football player Jackson Pace awakens from a nap to find his house covered in photographs taken on the night he beat up a gay classmate, Caleb, as part of a haze. Jackson is then stabbed to death by someone wearing a mask resembling his face, and the killer soon exposes the film of Caleb's assault to the entire school.

The next day at school, friends Makani, Alex, Zach, Darby and Rodrigo let Caleb sit with them at lunch after he is shunned by the rest of the school. The school's student council president Katie announces that there will be a memorial at a church. At the church while Katie is setting up, someone begins playing a racist and homophobic podcast that she recorded. She is confronted by the killer who is wearing a mask of her face, and fatally stabbed in the confessional while attempting to call 911. The following night, Zach hosts a party where everyone must share their secrets. The partygoers get high while Rodrigo takes fentanyl, which is his real secret. Rodrigo finds a trail of pills leading to his bottle before everyone gets text messages about his addiction. As the lights go out, prompting everyone to run away, Rodrigo is pursued by the killer (wearing a mask of his face) who ultimately forces him to choke on his fentanyl pills before slashing his throat.

The next day, most of the school believes that Makani's ex-boyfriend Ollie is the murderer. Ollie takes Makani out for a drive where they share a peaceful moment together, until Makani finds a taser gun in Ollie's car and realizes that Ollie ordered a background search on her, prompting her to call an Uber back home. That night, she awakens to find her front door open, her phone gone, and her living room plastered with pictures of a burn victim. The killer (wearing a mask of Makani's face) breaks the window and tries to kill her, but her friends arrive and save her, while the killer escapes. At the hospital, Makani tells her friends her real secret: during a hazing by her varsity teammates, she and the other haze victims were tortured and forced to get drunk. In a drunken state, Makani pushed one of her friends into a bonfire, badly burning her. She says that she is now sure Ollie is the killer, and the police place him under arrest.

The next day, Zach's rich father Skipper holds a corn maze next to the school. Darby messages Makani that Ollie has been released by his brother just as his car pulls up to the school parking lot. Makani runs inside to avoid him and she bumps into Caleb, who is then stabbed by the killer for trying to hide his homosexuality. The killer gives Makani the knife before Ollie and Makani's friends arrive and save Caleb. Makani realizes that the killer is headed for the corn maze.

At the corn maze, the killer sets it on fire with the football team inside, so Makani and her friends drive into the flames to help the players escape. Darby and Alex help them find their way out while Ollie and Makani try to find Zach. They ultimately confront the killer, now wearing Skipper's face, who kills Skipper before revealing himself to be Zach. He explains to Makani that he killed everyone because he wanted to expose everyone's secrets in revenge for the bullying he endured after failing to hide what he says is his secret: being the rich son of Skipper, whom the town disliked for making billions by selling and buying farms. Zach then reveals he intends to frame Makani for his crimes, but Ollie distracts him, allowing Makani to mortally wound Zach with a stab. As Zach lies wounded and helpless, Makani rebukes his motives and denounces him for blaming and killing others for what's wrong when Zach himself is the real problem. Having exposed his actual secret of being a murderous psychopath, Makani kills him, saying she doesn't need to wear a mask to show Zach who he truly was.

Sometime later, Makani, Ollie, and their friends celebrate graduation with everyone in the group getting into the colleges they wanted to attend. Makani decides to reconnect with her friend from the bonfire.

== Cast ==
- Sydney Park as Makani Young/Makani Sun-Woo, a teenager who moved from Hawaii to Nebraska in her junior year.
- Théodore Pellerin as Oliver "Ollie" Larsson, Makani's ex-boyfriend whom she later rekindles her relationship with.
- Asjha Cooper as Alexandra "Alex" Crisp, a musician, Rodrigo's love interest, and Makani's best friend.
- Jesse LaTourette as Justine Darby/"Darby", a non-binary student and outer space enthusiast.
- Diego Josef as Rodrigo Doran, Alex's love interest who struggles with a fentanyl addiction.
- Dale Whibley as Zachariah "Zach" Sandford, a rich student who is the son of the "land baron of Osborne".
- Burkely Duffield as Caleb Greeley, an openly gay student and football player who becomes close with Makani and her friends.
- Sarah Dugdale as Katie Koons, a highly religious student and the student council president who seems "perfect", but turns out to be a bigot and the killer's second victim.
- Markian Tarasiuk as Jackson Pace, a football player and the killer's first victim.
- Zane Clifford as Macon Bewley, Jackson's best friend.
- William Edward as Randall Brice, a friend of Macon's.
- Emilija Baranac as Hailey Holcomb, a student.
- Ivy Matheson as Kayla, a student.
- Kayla Heller as Olivia Grace, a student.
- Andrew Dunbar as Deputy Chris Larsson, the deputy of Osborne and Ollie's older brother who raises him.
- Tedra Rogers as Abigail, a student.
- Tally Rodin as Jasmine, Makani's friend from her old school whom she accidentally pushed into the bonfire.
- Anthony Timpano as Witt, a student.
- Brittany Hobson as Briana, a student.
- William MacDonald as Skipper Sandford, Zach's father who buys and sells farms.
- Jade Falcon as Stacy Pritchett, Macon's girlfriend.
- David Lewis as Mr. Pace, Jackson's father.
- BJ Harrison as Sabrina "Gam" Young, Makani's grandmother.

== Production ==
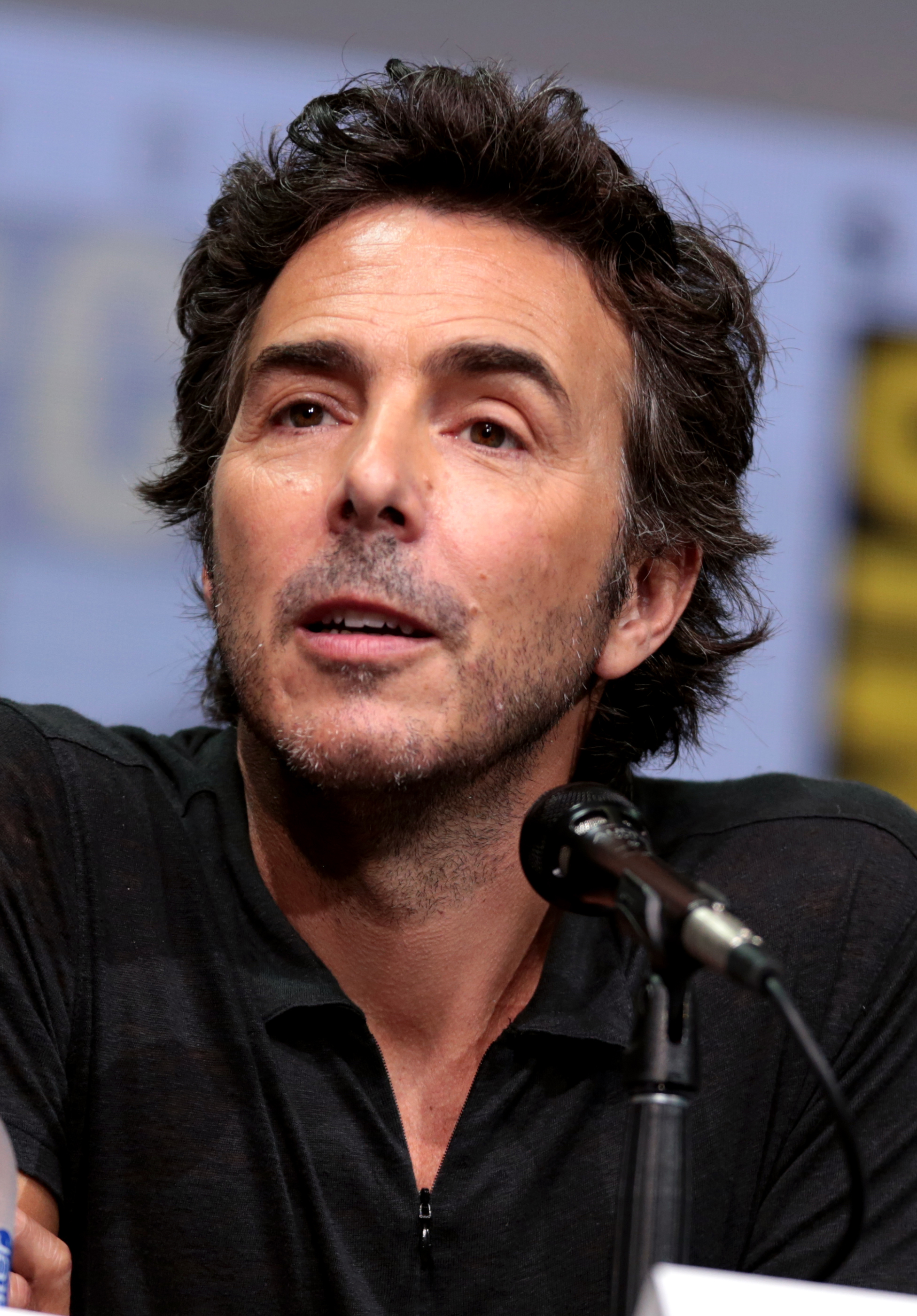
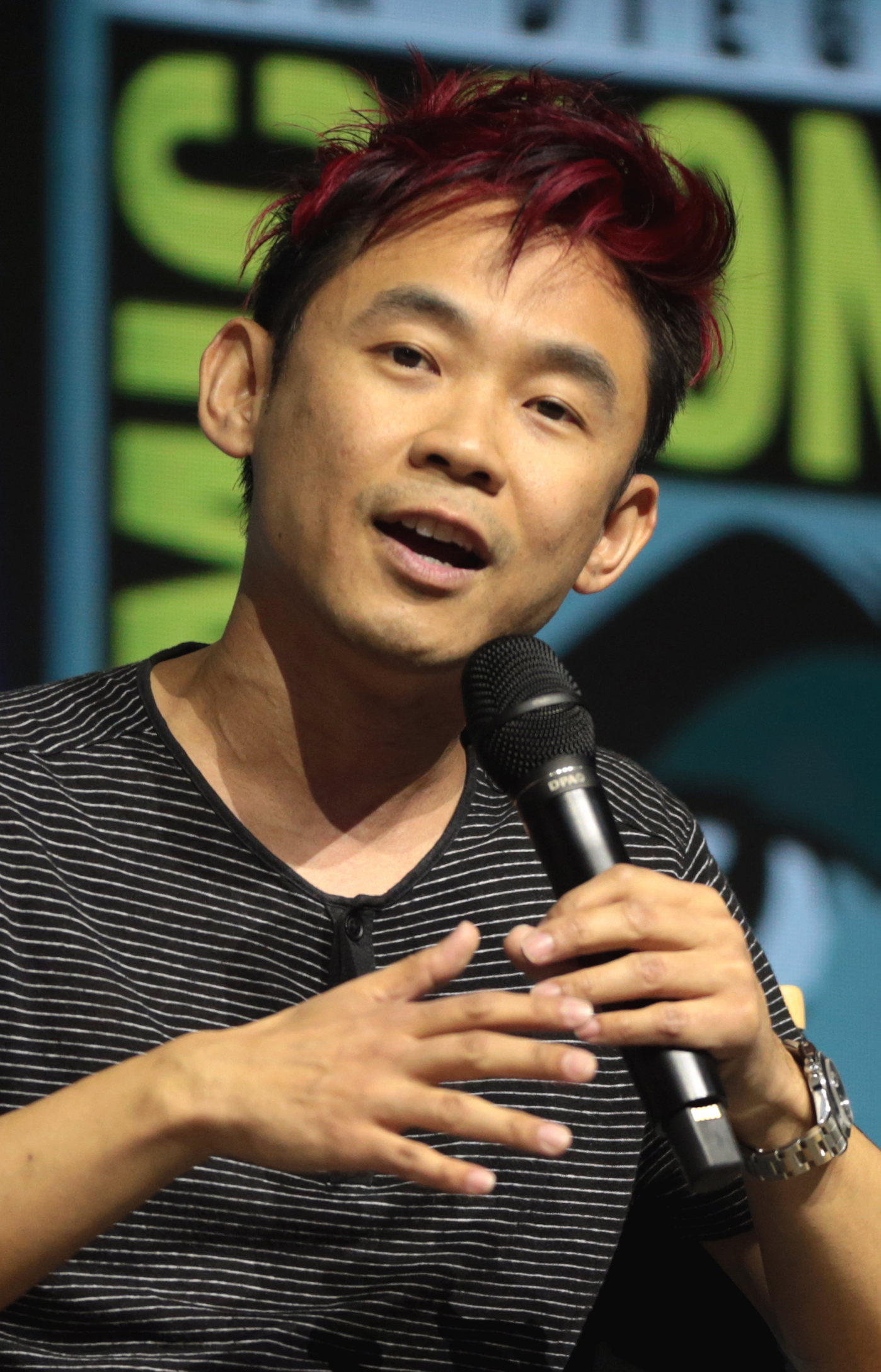
Producers Shawn Levy and James Wan

There's Someone Inside Your House is an adaptation of the 2017 novel of the same name by Stephanie Perkins. The project was announced in March 2018, when Deadline Hollywood revealed Netflix had partnered with Shawn Levy and James Wan to produce the film under their Atomic Monster and 21 Laps companies, respectively, with a screenplay adapted by Henry Gayden. At the time, the film was described as an amalgamation of genres, in the vein of quintessential slasher films such as Friday the 13th and Scream as well as coming-of-age dramas such as John Hughes' The Breakfast Club and George Lucas' American Graffiti. Additional producers of the film include Dan Cohen and Michael Clear.

In March 2019, it was announced that Patrick Brice would direct the film from Gayden's script. In August 2019, Sydney Park, Théodore Pellerin, Asjha Cooper, Dale Whibley, Jesse LaTourette, Burkely Duffield, Diego Josef, Zane Clifford and Sarah Dugdale joined the cast of the film. Principal photography began in Vancouver, British Columbia, Canada, on August 22, 2019, and ended on October 12, 2019. Additional photography for the film concluded on August 23, 2020. Michel Aller served as the primary editor for the film. Zachary Dawes composed the score.

== Release ==
There's Someone Inside Your House premiered at Fantastic Fest on September 23, 2021. The film was initially expected to be released on Netflix in February 2021 but was later delayed, and in August 2021, Netflix announced that it would be released on October 6, 2021.

== Reception ==
On the review aggregator website Rotten Tomatoes, 47% of 57 critics' reviews are positive, with an average rating of 5.5/10. The website's consensus reads: "A likable cast and strong set pieces give There's Someone Inside Your House a lift, but they're outweighed by its messily misguided story." On Metacritic, the film has a weighted average score of 45 out of 100, based on reviews from 12 critics, indicating "mixed or average reviews".

Jeannette Catsoulis of The New York Times wrote: "In trying to have it both ways, Brice has created a messy, overstuffed parody of moral policing that squanders the promise of its cleverly executed opening." Benjamin Lee of The Guardian gave the film 2/5 stars, writing: "Director Patrick Brice is so distracted with trying to be of the moment that he forgets to make his film base-level fun or at times even base-level coherent".

Michael Nordine of Variety wrote that the film was "more refreshing than it should be", and added: "the success of 'Someone' hinges on the fact that it ultimately embraces the future rather than clinging to the past." Matthew Jackson of Looper wrote: "While it doesn't carry the meta-textual cleverness of 'Scream,' the genre-bending zaniness of 'Freaky,' or the timeless feel of 'Halloween,' there's something instantly and tremendously appealing about 'There's Someone Inside Your House.'"
