= Justin Time =

Justin Time may refer to:

- Justin Time Records, a Canadian independent record label established in 1983
- Justin Time (film), a 2010 American direct-to-video film
- Justin Time (TV series), a 2011 Canadian animated television series

== See also ==
- Just in Time (disambiguation)
