= Anna and the French Kiss =

Young adult novel by Stephanie Perkins

- Author: Stephanie Perkins
- Language: English
- Genre: Young adult
- Publisher: Dutton Juvenile
- Publication date: December 2, 2010
- Publication place: United States
- Media type: Print (hardback)
- Pages: 372
- ISBN: 978-0-525-42327-0

Anna and the French Kiss is the 2010 debut novel of Stephanie Perkins. The book was published on December 2, 2010, through Dutton Juvenile and was written during National Novel Writing Month. The book was followed with the sequels Lola and the Boy Next Door and Isla and the Happily Ever After.

Of the book and her writing in general, Perkins has stated that she wears a different scent for each book that she writes and that she wore lychee rose while writing Anna and the French Kiss.

== Plot ==
Anna Oliphant is a senior in high school who is forced by her father to attend the fictional boarding school 'School of America in Paris' – nicknamed SOAP by students. She is heavily against having to leave Atlanta for Paris, specifically due to leaving her best friend, Bridgette, and Toph, her almost boyfriend, who worked with her in a multiplex and the two shared a kiss before her leaving for Paris. Anna wants to become a film critic, being a major movie fan. On her first night at SOAP, she meets her neighbor Meredith (Mer), who consoles her after finding Anna crying in her room. After Anna leaves Meredith's room, she bumps into a handsome boy who introduces himself as Étienne St. Clair, and has an English accent. The next morning at breakfast, Mer invites Anna to sit with her and her friends; Rashmi and boyfriend Josh, as well as Étienne from the night before – he is known by everyone as St. Clair. St. Clair has a girlfriend, Ellie, who used to be in the group before she graduated SOAP.

Anna can neither read nor speak French, and feels inferior among her classmates, leading to St. Clair's assistance in ordering breakfast. She notices St. Clair's popularity amongst the students, mainly as a result of his natural charm. St. Clair and Anna are appointed as lab partners for the remainder of the year. Anna discovers she is the only senior in Beginning French, except for a junior named Dave. Anna learns that Mer has a crush on St. Clair on which she can't act, because of his girlfriend. After a week in SOAP Josh, Rashmi, St. Clair and Mer is surprised to learn that Anna hasn't yet gone out of campus to explore Paris. She is more than happy when St. Clair takes her out to explore Paris. They talk, laugh, visit point zero of France and bond more. St. Clair learns about Toph, and Anna meets his girlfriend "Ellie" for the first time. She reminds herself despite her attraction towards St. Clair that he's taken and nothing can happen between them.

Over the next few weeks, Anna and St. Clair become best friends.He doodles on her homework, sits next to her at every meal, teases her about her sneakers, asks about her favorite films, and conjugates her French homework. Anna knows she wants more... and St. Clair doesn't seem to be denying that something more than friendship is growing between them.

One day, when the group was hanging out in a cemetery, St. Clair learns that his mother is dying due to cervical cancer, and his father doesn't want him to meet her. St. Clair gets drunk later that night, and confesses his liking for Anna.

Anna worries about St. Clair and seeing a cheerful and kind boy go quiet makes her heart sink. The group tries to cheer him up, and Anna lies to St. Clair when he asked if he said something to her when he was drunk. All the students and their friends leave for Thanksgiving, leaving Anna and St. Clair alone, because their Fathers refused to have them home. Anna tries her best to cheer a bed stricken St. Clair to celebrate Thanksgiving and stop sulking by convincing him that her mother wouldn't want to see him like that. Her efforts worked out, and St. Clair relaxed a bit with her company. At night, he requested Anna to let him sleep with her, not wanting to be alone. The duo never grew intimate, fearing it will ruin their friendship. Anna goes back to Atlanta, and St. Clair meets her mother. She discovers that her best friend Bridge and Toph had been secretly dating each other and neither cared to tell her that. Anna rants about her father, her family, Bridge's betrayal to St. Clair over phone calls and Emails every day. When she meets him for the first time after coming back, she realise she has fallen in love with her best friend, and calls him Etienne for the first time, much to his delight.

Soon, St. Clair's mother announced that she is Cancer free, much to his delight. The group went out to celebrate, where Anna and St. Clair kissed in the Park. But things didn't go well when Mer saw them kissing each other, St. Clair running back to Ellie and Anna's fight with Amanda when she abused Mer. She yelled at St. Clair before he could explain, and stopped talking to the group, assuming that everyone hates her. Coincidentally, when Anna and St. Clair were put together for detention he explains Anna that he went back to Ellie to break up with her. Anna determined to set things right, sends a letter to her best friend Bridge, reconciles with her friends, apologizes to Mer, who says she and St. Clair is perfect for each other and she was just in denial to admit this to herself.

Later, Anna goes to Notre dame where Étienne follows her all the way up, despite his fear for heights, to confess that he's in love with her. He confronted Anna asking her why did she lie when he asked her about that night he drunkenly confessed his feelings. He said Josh told him what he said and things would've been different long ago, if she had just told her how she felt. They both realise how stupid they'd been and confessed their love, while kissing each other.

== Characters ==
- Anna Oliphant - Main and title character of the novel. Anna gets transferred from Atlanta, Georgia, to Paris, France, for her senior year of high school (School of America in Paris). She has dark brown hair with a bleached blond stripe through it, and she has a gap between her front teeth that she describes as being "as large as a raisin". She has a love for movies and being a movie critic is her dream job.
- Étienne St. Clair - Commonly called by his last name, Étienne is Anna's main love interest, yet he dates Ellie for the majority of the duration of the book. He was born in the United States, raised in England, and goes to school in Paris. He is described as being short. He has a wicked charm and, some girls have crushes on him throughout the book because of that and because he is very beautiful. He is afraid of being alone.
- Bridgette Sanderwick - Anna's best friend back home in Georgia. She is the drummer for Toph's band.
- Meredith Chevalier - Anna's friend in Paris. She loves soccer and has a crush on St. Clair. Because of this Anna keeps her crush on him a secret.
- Rashmi Devi - One of Anna's friends at The School of America in Paris. Rashmi is dating Josh.
- Joshua Wasserstein "Josh" - Rashmi's boyfriend and another of Anna's clique at SOAP. He is an artist. He is a junior instead of a senior unlike everyone in Anna's clique.
- Ellen "Ellie" - Étienne St. Clair's steady girlfriend. She is a year older than Anna.
- Amanda Spitterton-Watts - The main antagonist of the story, Amanda is constantly making fun of Anna, because of her good relationship with St. Clair.
- Christopher - Nicknamed Toph, he is Anna's crush before she leaves for SOAP. He had kissed Anna before she left, making her think they had a chance of getting together when she returns. He begins dating Bridgette, and they don't tell Anna, angering her.
- Sean "Seany" Oliphant - Anna's little brother.
- James Oliphant - Anna's father. It was his idea to send her to Paris for her senior year. He is a famous author. His pen name is James Ashley.

== Reception ==
Critical reception for the book was generally positive, with NPR naming it one of the "Year's Best Teen Reads" for 2010. Kirkus Reviews and Publishers Weekly both gave positive reviews for the book, with Publishers Weekly praising the audiobook's narration. The School Library Journal gave a lengthy positive review for the novel, with the reviewer citing it as one of their favorite books of 2010. Booklist commented that while the book was "an absorbing and enjoyable read," it also had "predictable crossed-signal plot twists".
