= Corporate Animals =

2019 film directed by Patrick Brice

- Theatrical release poster
- Directed by: Patrick Brice
- Written by: Sam Bain
- Produced by: Keith Calder; Jessica Calder; Mike Falbo; Ed Helms
- Starring: Jessica Williams; Karan Soni; Isiah Whitlock Jr.; Martha Kelly; Dan Bakkedahl; Calum Worthy; Jennifer Kim; Nasim Pedrad; Ed Helms; Demi Moore
- Cinematography: Tarin Anderson
- Edited by: Chris Donlon
- Music by: Michael Yezerski
- Production companies: Snoot Films; Pacific Electric Picture Co.; Protagonist Pictures
- Distributed by: Screen Media Films
- Release dates: January 29, 2019 (Sundance); September 20, 2019 (United States)
- Running time: 86 minutes
- Country: United States
- Language: English
- Box office: $22,588

Corporate Animals is a 2019 American comedy horror film directed by Patrick Brice and written by Sam Bain. The film stars Jessica Williams, Karan Soni, Isiah Whitlock Jr., Martha Kelly, Dan Bakkedahl, Calum Worthy, Jennifer Kim, Nasim Pedrad, Ed Helms, and Demi Moore.

Corporate Animals had its world premiere at the Sundance Film Festival on January 29, 2019, and was released in the United States on September 20, 2019, by Screen Media Films. Critic reviews were generally negative.

== Plot ==
Lucy is the abusive, unethical, egotistical CEO of Incredible Edibles, America's premiere provider of edible cutlery. In an effort to save her failing company, she forces her employees on a team building exercise in New Mexico beginning with the task of moving a giant concrete boulder on to a truck. After failing to push the boulder, they attempt to use a large log as a lever to roll the boulder. This attempt also fails as the log snaps, shooting a piece into Aidan's (the intern) leg.

Following this failed exercise, the team embarks on a hike led by Brandon, their indifferent tour guide. While Brandon suggests they take the beginner's route, Lucy instead forces everyone down the advanced route into a nearby cave system. After spelunking through a narrow passageway, the group enter into a large cavern which is lit by a small generator. As the group explores the cavern, a small earthquake occurs, unnerving the group. Panicked, Brandon tries to leave through the now even more narrow entrance but is crushed to death by an aftershock which loosens the boulders above him.

Trapped inside the cave, the group quickly descends into chaos. Aidan begins hallucinating. The group explain Freddie's nickname (FT) actually means "Fuck Toy" because Freddie and Lucy maintain a sexual relationship, albeit Freddie reveals that Lucy is actually "Weinsteinning him." We also learn that Lucy's company is in dire financial trouble, that Lucy steals the group's good ideas, and that she refuses to give Gloria a one dollar bill to use as toilet paper (despite the fact that it is her birthday). Following these revelations, the group expresses their immense hatred toward Lucy, who arrogantly defends herself.

Having only had one package of edible cutlery which Aidan brought, the group quickly run out of food and decide to cannibalize Brandon. As they begin to parcel out his body, they discover he is missing an arm which is eventually found among Lucy's things. After this, Lucy loses complete control of the group. The situation becomes worse when the generator runs out of power, plunging the group into darkness. Lucy assaults Jess after a verbal confrontation and Freddie pushes Lucy in an effort to help Jess. Lucy falls and hits her head on a rock on the ground, becoming immobile. As she lies on the ground, Lucy threatens and belittles Freddie.

The group then hears a drill at the top of the cave, and Jess rallies the workers in moving a large rock with a lever in order to hurry along their rescue. The rock falls and crushes Lucy just as the drill punches through the top of the cave. In the ensuing interview, the group recounts their experience, lying about Lucy's demeanor and Brandon's behavior so that they appear better than they were.

== Cast ==
- Demi Moore as Lucy Vanderton
- Ed Helms as Brandon
- Jessica Williams as Jess
- Karan Soni as Freddie
- Isiah Whitlock Jr. as Derek
- Calum Worthy as Aidan
- Dan Bakkedahl as Billy
- Martha Kelly as Gloria
- Nasim Pedrad as Suzy
- Jennifer Kim as May
- Britney Spears as Ghost of herself (voice)

== Production ==
In May 2018, Sharon Stone, Ed Helms, Jessica Williams, were announced to be cast in the film, with Patrick Brice directing from a screenplay by Sam Bain. Keith Calder, Jessica Calder, Mike Falbo and Helms will produce the film, under their Snoot Entertainment and Pacific Electric banners, respectively. In June 2018, Demi Moore joined the cast of the film, replacing Stone, alongside Karan Soni, Isiah Whitlock Jr., Calum Worthy, Dan Bakkedahl, Martha Kelly, Jennifer Kim and Nasim Pedrad joined the cast of the film.

Principal photography began in June 2018, in Santa Fe, New Mexico.

== Release ==
It had its world premiere at the Sundance Film Festival on January 29, 2019. Shortly after, Screen Media Films acquired distribution rights to the film. It was released on September 20, 2019.

== Reception ==
On the review aggregator website Rotten Tomatoes, 25% of 51 reviews are positive, with an average rating of 4.1/10. The website's critical consensus reads, "Corporate culture may seem like easy pickings for satire, but the middling Corporate Animals proves even the broadest targets can be missed."
