= My True Love Gave To Me: Twelve Holiday Stories =

Book by Stephanie Perkins

My True Love Gave to Me
- First edition
- Author: Stephanie Perkins (Editor)
- Language: English
- Genre: Young adult
- Publisher: St. Martin's Press
- Publication date: October 14, 2014
- Publication place: United States
- Media type: Print (hardback)
- Pages: 321
- ISBN: 978-1250059307

My True Love Gave to Me: Twelve Holiday Stories is a 2014 anthology edited by Stephanie Perkins with twelve holiday stories contributed by Perkins, Holly Black, Ally Carter, Matt de la Peña, Gayle Forman, Jenny Han, David Levithan, Kelly Link, Myra McEntire, Rainbow Rowell, Laini Taylor and Kiersten White. It was published on October 14 by St. Martin's Press.

This anthology features twelve stories set during the winter months, each told separately and focusing on a different pair of characters falling in love within various holiday settings.

== Stories ==
- “Midnights” by Rainbow Rowell
- “The Lady and the Fox” by Kelly Link
- “Angels in the Snow” by Matt de la Peña
- “Polaris Is Where You’ll Find Me” by Jenny Han
- "It’s a Yuletide Miracle, Charlie Brown” by Stephanie Perkins.
- "Your Temporary Santa” by David Levithan.
- "Krampuslauf" by Holly Black.
- "What the Hell Have You Done, Sophie Roth?” by Gayle Forman.
- “Beer Buckets and Baby Jesus” by Myra McEntire
- “Welcome to Christmas, CA” by Kiersten White.
- “Star of Bethlehem” by Ally Carter.
- "The Girl Who Woke the Dreamer" by Laini Taylor.

== Reception ==
Reception for the book was generally positive, with Publishers Weekly stating "there's no shortage of cozy setups for holiday romance in this captivating collection of short stories", describing it as "a rare seasonal treat". Ellen Hopkins of The New York Times Book Review praised it as "a marvelous collection, certain to earn a treasured spot on many Y.A. shelves" commending the diversity of the characters and intelligent storytelling.
