= 21 Laps Entertainment =

American production company

21 Laps, Inc.
- Logo used since 2014
- Trade name: 21 Laps Entertainment
- Formerly: Wunjo, Inc. (1999–2005)
- Industry: Film; Television
- Founded: January 29, 1999; 27 years ago (as Wunjo, Inc.); 2005; 21 years ago (as 21 Laps Entertainment)
- Founder: Shawn Levy
- Headquarters: 888 Seventh Avenue, New York City, New York 10106, United States
- Area served: Worldwide
- Key people: Shawn Levy (CEO); Dan Levine (Partner)
- Products: Motion pictures, television programs

21 Laps, Inc., doing business as 21 Laps Entertainment, is an American film and television production company founded and run by filmmaker Shawn Levy. The company is best known as the producers of Stranger Things, and exclusively distributes content through a partnership with Netflix. It has also produced films like Cheaper by the Dozen, The Spectacular Now, Real Steel, Arrival, and the Night at the Museum franchise, as well as Levy's collaborations with actor and producer Ryan Reynolds, which include Free Guy, The Adam Project and Deadpool & Wolverine. The company's name originates from the number of laps Levy's eldest daughter ran in a jogathon when she was 5 years old. In addition, the logo is supposed to represent a race track.

== History ==
In 1999, Shawn Levy, who after his start on television incorporated and founded the company as Wunjo, Inc. It was in-name only from the beginning until 2005. Levy made his breakout role as a film director on Big Fat Liar, Just Married, and Cheaper by the Dozen.

In 2003, Levy, after the success of his aforementioned feature films, launched his own production company with a first-look deal at 20th Century Fox Television. The deal was to produce half-hour sitcoms and hour-long dramas.

In 2005, Levy rebranded the studio to 21 Laps Entertainment and it signed a non-exclusive deal with 20th Century Fox to produce their films. The film division would be run by Tom McNulty, formerly an employee from Happy Madison Productions, and its television division by J.J. Klein. The first two products were Cheaper by the Dozen 2 and Pepper Dennis.

In 2010, Levy and Marty Adelstein signed on to form a television company called 21 Laps/Adelstein Productions, and they signed a deal with 20th Century Fox Television and hired Becky Clements to serve as president.

In 2014, both Levy and Adelstein parted ways, with the latter launching Tomorrow Studios as a joint venture with ITV Studios.

In July 2016, one of the company's television projects, Stranger Things, premiered on Netflix and achieved critical acclaim, earning a 95% on Rotten Tomatoes with 55 out of 58 reviews being positive. The show's first season was also one of Netflix's most watched series, averaging 14.07 million adults 18–49 in its first 35 days. Along with producing the series, Levy directed two of the premiere season's episodes. The third season premiered on July 4, 2019 and the fourth season premiered in two parts on May 27, 2022 and July 1, 2022. It was renewed for a fifth and final season. In 2020, the company signed a first look deal with Netflix.

In January 2026, Netflix announced that the company would be producing a new hockey themed original series starring Michelle Monaghan which received similarities to the 2018 Humboldt Broncos bus crash, and was criticized by the families and survivors of the crash who received no notice about the project occurring.

In September 2026, 21 Laps Entertainment signed an overall television deal with Disney's 20th Television. The agreement, scheduled to begin in October 2027, will see Levy and the company develop and produce television series across Disney Entertainment's platforms and brands. The deal followed competitive negotiations that resulted in Levy moving his television business from Netflix to Disney. Under the agreement, 21 Laps will continue collaborating with Netflix on the Stranger Things franchise, including its planned spin-off projects.

== Filmography ==
=== Films ===
| Release date | Title | Director | Writer | Producer | Distributor | Notes |
|---|---|---|---|---|---|---|
| October 23, 2001 | I Saw Mommy Kissing Santa Claus | John Shepphird | Randy Vampotic; Mike Sorrentino; Steve Jankowski; John Shepphird | James Rosenthal; Jeffrey Schenck; Shawn Levy; Steve Jankowski | PAX | first film; uncredited; co-production with Regent Entertainment, ACH and Medien Capital Treuhand |
| February 8, 2002 | Big Fat Liar | Shawn Levy | Story by: Dan Schneider; Brian Robbins Screenplay by: Dan Schneider | Brian Robbins; Mike Tollin | Universal Pictures | first theatrical film; uncredited; co-production with Tollin/Robbins Productions |
| January 10, 2003 | Just Married | Shawn Levy | Sam Harper | Robert Simonds; Lauren Shuler Donner | 20th Century Fox | uncredited; co-production with The Donners' Company and Robert Simonds Productions |
| December 25, 2003 | Cheaper by the Dozen | Shawn Levy | Story by: Craig Titley Screenplay by: Sam Harper; Joel Cohen; Alec Sokolow | Robert Simonds; Michael Barnathan; Ben Myron | 20th Century Fox | uncredited; co-production with Robert Simonds Productions |
| December 21, 2005 | Cheaper by the Dozen 2 | Adam Shankman | Sam Harper | Shawn Levy; Ben Myron | 20th Century Fox | First credited film under the 21 Laps label |
| December 22, 2006 | Night at the Museum | Shawn Levy | Robert Ben Garant; Thomas Lennon | Shawn Levy; Chris Columbus; Michael Barnathan | 20th Century Fox | co-produced with 1492 Pictures and Dune Entertainment |
| May 9, 2008 | What Happens in Vegas | Tom Vaughan | Dana Fox | Michael Aguilar; Shawn Levy; Jimmy Miller | 20th Century Fox | co-produced with Regency Enterprises, Mosaic Media Group, Dune Entertainment and Penn Station Entertainment |
| August 20, 2008 | The Rocker | Peter Cattaneo | Maya Forbes; Wallace Wolodarsky | Shawn Levy; Tom McNulty | 20th Century Fox | co-produced with Fox Atomic |
| May 22, 2009 | Night at the Museum: Battle of the Smithsonian | Shawn Levy | Robert Ben Garant; Thomas Lennon | Shawn Levy; Chris Columbus; Michael Barnathan | 20th Century Fox | co-produced with 1492 Pictures, Dune Entertainment and Ingenious Film Partners |
| April 9, 2010 | Date Night | Shawn Levy | Josh Klausner | Shawn Levy | 20th Century Fox | co-produced with Dune Entertainment |
| October 7, 2011 | Real Steel | Shawn Levy | Story by: Dan Gilroy; Jeremy Leven Screenplay by: John Gatins | Don Murphy; Susan Montford; Shawn Levy | Walt Disney Studios Motion Pictures | co-produced with Touchstone Pictures, DreamWorks Pictures and Reliance Entertainment |
| July 27, 2012 | The Watch | Akiva Schaffer | Jared Stern; Seth Rogen; Evan Goldberg | Shawn Levy | 20th Century Fox | co-produced with Dune Entertainment |
| June 7, 2013 | The Internship | Shawn Levy | Story by: Vince Vaughn Screenplay by: Vince Vaughn; Jared Stern | Vince Vaughn; Shawn Levy | 20th Century Fox | co-produced with Regency Enterprises and Wild West Picture Show Productions |
| August 2, 2013 | The Spectacular Now | James Ponsoldt | Scott Neustadter; Michael H. Weber | Tom McNulty; Shawn Levy; Andrew Lauren; Michelle Krumm | A24 | co-produced with Andrew Lauren Productions and Global Produce |
| September 19, 2014 | This Is Where I Leave You | Shawn Levy | Jonathan Tropper | Shawn Levy; Paula Weinstein; Jeffrey Levine | Warner Bros. Pictures | co-produced with Spring Creek Productions |
| October 10, 2014 | Alexander and the Terrible, Horrible, No Good, Very Bad Day | Miguel Arteta | Rob Lieber | Shawn Levy; Dan Levine; Lisa Henson | Walt Disney Studios Motion Pictures | co-produced with Walt Disney Pictures and The Jim Henson Company |
| December 19, 2014 | Night at the Museum: Secret of the Tomb | Shawn Levy | Story by: Mark Friedman; David Guion; Michael Handelman Screenplay by: David Guion; Michael Handelman | Shawn Levy; Chris Columbus; Mark Radcliffe | 20th Century Fox | co-produced with 1492 Pictures |
| November 11, 2016 | Arrival | Denis Villeneuve | Eric Heisserer | Shawn Levy; Dan Levine; Aaron Ryder; David Linde | Paramount Pictures (North America & P.R.China); Stage 6 Films (International); Entertainment One (United Kingdom); Roadshow Films (Australia) | co-produced with FilmNation Entertainment and Lava Bear Films |
| December 23, 2016 | Why Him? | John Hamburg | Story by: Jonah Hill; John Hamburg; Ian Helfer Story by: John Hamburg; Ian Helfer | Shawn Levy; Dan Levine; Ben Stiller; Jonah Hill | 20th Century Fox | co-produced with Red Hour Productions |
| February 17, 2017 | Fist Fight | Richie Keen | Story by: Van Robichaux; Evan Susser; Max Greenfield Screenplay by: Van Robichaux; Evan Susser | Shawn Levy; Max Greenfield; John Rickard; Dan Cohen | Warner Bros. Pictures | co-produced with New Line Cinema, Village Roadshow Pictures, RatPac-Dune Entertainment and Wrigley Pictures |
| March 3, 2017 | Table 19 | Jeffrey Blitz | Story by: Jay Duplass; Mark Duplass; Jeffrey Blitz Screenplay by: Jeffrey Blitz | Shawn Levy; Tom McNulty; Mark Roberts; P. Jennifer Dana | Fox Searchlight Pictures | co-produced with 3311 Productions |
| April 20, 2018 | Kodachrome | Mark Raso | Jonathan Tropper | Ellen Goldsmith-Vein; Eric Robinson; Jonathan Tropper; Shawn Levy; Dan Levine; Leon Clarence | Netflix | co-produced with The Gotham Group and Motion Picture Capital |
| August 3, 2018 | The Darkest Minds | Jennifer Yuh Nelson | Chad Hodge | Shawn Levy; Dan Levine | 20th Century Fox | |
| August 31, 2018 | Kin | Jonathan Baker and Josh Baker | Daniel Casey | Shawn Levy; Dan Cohen; Jeff Arkuss; David Gross; Jesse Shapira | Lionsgate | co-produced with Summit Entertainment and No Trace Camping |
| October 16, 2020 | Love and Monsters | Michael Matthews | Story by: Brian Duffield Screenplay by: Brian Duffield; Matthew Robinson | Shawn Levy; Dan Cohen | Paramount Pictures (North America); Netflix (International) | co-produced with Entertainment One |
| February 19, 2021 | The Violent Heart | Kerem Sanga | | Shawn Levy; Dan Cohen; Edward L. McDonnell; Tobey Maguire; Matthew Plouffe; P. Jennifer Dana; Mark Roberts | Gravitas Ventures | co-produced with Material Pictures and 3311 Productions |
| August 13, 2021 | Free Guy | Shawn Levy | Story by: Matt Lieberman Screenplay by: Matt Lieberman; Zak Penn | Ryan Reynolds; Shawn Levy; Sarah Schechter; Greg Berlanti; Adam Kolbrenner | 20th Century Studios | co-produced with Maximum Effort, Berlanti Productions and Lit Entertainment Group |
| October 6, 2021 | There's Someone Inside Your House | Patrick Brice | Henry Gayden | Shawn Levy; Dan Cohen; James Wan; Michael Clear | Netflix | co-produced with Atomic Monster |
| March 11, 2022 | The Adam Project | Shawn Levy | Jonathan Tropper; T. S. Nowlin; Jennifer Flackett; Mark Levin | David Ellison; Dana Goldberg; Don Granger; Shawn Levy; Ryan Reynolds | Netflix | co-produced with Maximum Effort and Skydance Media |
| October 14, 2022 | Rosaline | Karen Maine | Scott Neustadter; Michael H. Weber | Shawn Levy; Dan Cohen; Dan Levine | Hulu (United States); Disney+ (International, via Star); Star+ (Latin America) | co-produced with 20th Century Studios |
| December 9, 2022 | Night at the Museum: Kahmunrah Rises Again | Matt Danner | Ray DeLaurentis; Will Schifrin | Shawn Levy | Disney+ | co-produced with Walt Disney Pictures, Atomic Cartoons and Alibaba Pictures |
| May 12, 2023 | Crater | Kyle Patrick Alvarez | John Griffin | Dan Cohen; Dan Levine; Shawn Levy | Disney+ | co-produced with Walt Disney Pictures |
| June 2, 2023 | The Boogeyman | Rob Savage | Story by: Scott Beck; Bryan Woods Screenplay by: Scott Beck; Bryan Woods; Mark Heyman | Shawn Levy; Dan Levine; Dan Cohen | 20th Century Studios | co-produced with NeoReel |
| July 26, 2024 | Deadpool & Wolverine | Shawn Levy | Ryan Reynolds; Rhett Reese; Paul Wernick; Zeb Wells; Shawn Levy | Kevin Feige; Lauren Shuler Donner; Ryan Reynolds; Shawn Levy | Walt Disney Studios Motion Pictures | co-produced with Marvel Studios and Maximum Effort |
| September 20, 2024 | Never Let Go | Alexandre Aja | KC Coughlin; Ryan Grassby | Shawn Levy; Dan Cohen; Thiago Andreo Barbosa Nogueira; Dan Levine; Alexandre Aja | Lionsgate Films | co-produced with HalleHolly and Media Capital Technologies |
| March 28, 2025 | Alexander and the Terrible, Horrible, No Good, Very Bad Road Trip | Marvin Lemus | Matt Lopez | Shawn Levy; Dan Levine; Dan Cohen; Lisa Henson | Disney+ | co-produced with Walt Disney Pictures and The Jim Henson Company |
| May 29, 2026 | Backrooms | Kane Parsons | Will Soodik | James Wan; Michael Clear; Roberto Patino; Shawn Levy; Dan Cohen; Dan Levine; Osgood Perkins; Chris Ferguson; Peter Chernin; Jenno Topping; Kori Adelson | A24 | co-produced with North Road Films, Atomic Monster, Phobos and Oddfellows Pictures |
Upcoming
| May 21, 2027 | The Catch | Dave McCary | Patrick Kang; Michael Levin | Shawn Levy; Dan Levine; Michael H. Weber; Emma Stone; Dave McCary; Ali Herting | Universal Pictures | co-produced with Fruit Tree |
| May 28, 2027 | Star Wars: Starfighter | Shawn Levy | Jonathan Tropper | Shawn Levy; Kathleen Kennedy | Walt Disney Studios Motion Pictures | co-produced with Lucasfilm |
| November 12, 2027 | Seasons | Drew Hancock | | Shawn Levy; Dan Levine; James Wan; Michael Clear; Scott Glassgold; Dan Cohen | Amazon MGM Studios | co-produced with Blumhouse Productions, Atomic Monster and 12:01 Films |
| July 28, 2028 | Ghost Rider | Shawn Levy | Jonathan Tropper | Kevin Feige, Louis D'Esposito, Stephen Broussard, Shawn Levy, and Ryan Gosling | Walt Disney Studios Motion Pictures | co-produced with Marvel Studios |
| TBA | Abbi and the Eighth Wonder | Clea DuVall | Matt Roller | TBA | Sony Pictures Releasing | co-produced with TriStar Pictures |
| TBA | Be More Chill | TBA | TBA | TBA | 20th Century Studios | co-produced with 5000 Broadway Productions and Berlanti Productions |
| TBA | Boy Band | Shawn Levy | Story by: Ryan Renyolds Screenplay by: Ryan Renyolds; Jesse Andrews | TBA | Paramount Pictures | co-produced with Maximum Effort |
| TBA | Club 33 | TBA | TBA | TBA | Walt Disney Studios Motion Pictures | co-produced with Walt Disney Pictures |
| TBA | Consume | David Gelb | TBA | TBA | Searchlight Pictures | co-produced with Supper Club |
| TBA | Dad Camp | TBA | TBA | TBA | Netflix | co-produced with Happy Madison Productions |
| TBA | Deep End | TBA | TBA | TBA | Netflix | co-produced with Unwell Productions |
| TBA | Kingmakers | TBA | Christopher MacBride | TBA | Netflix | co-produced with Story Kitchen and TinyBuild |
| TBA | One Attempt Remaining | Kay Cannon | Kay Cannon; Joe Boothe; Alexa Alemanni | TBA | Netflix | |
| TBA | Riders of Justice | Michael Schwartz; Tyler Nilson | | TBA | Lionsgate Films | |
| TBA | Sabine | TBA | TBA | TBA | Sony Pictures Releasing | co-produced with Screen Gems |
| TBA | Seismic | TBA | TBA | TBA | Netflix | co-produced with Lit Entertainment Group |
| TBA | Untitled Free Guy sequel | TBA | TBA | TBA | 20th Century Studios | co-produced with Maximum Effort, Berlanti Productions and Lit Entertainment Group |
| TBA | The Blanks | TBA | TBA | TBA | Netflix | co-produced with Aperture Entertainment |
| TBA | Untitled international heist film | Shawn Levy | TBA | TBA | Netflix | co-produced with Maximum Effort and Genre Films |
| TBA | Somewhere Out There | Shawn Levy | TBA | TBA | Netflix | |
| TBA | The Girlfriend | Natalie Morales | TBA | TBA | TBA | co-produced with XYZ Films, BuzzFeed Studios, Zoe Knife Productions and Persons Unknown |
| TBA | Blur | Kirill Sokolov | TBA | TBA | Netflix | |
| TBA | Untitled spy comedy film | McG | Jonathan Tropper; Aaron and Adam Nee; Lizzie and Wendy Molyneux | Shawn Levy; Dan Levine; Ryan Reynolds; Ashley Fox; Johnny Pariseau; Kevin Hart; Luke Kelly-Clyne; Bryan Smiley | Netflix | co-produced with Maximum Effort and Hartbeat |

=== Television ===
| Year | Title | Creator(s) | Network | Notes |
|---|---|---|---|---|
| 2006 | Pepper Dennis | Gretchen J. Berg; Aaron Harberts | The WB | co-produced with 20th Century Fox Television and Two Presbyterians Productions |
| 2011–2017; 2018–2021 | Last Man Standing | Jack Burditt | ABC; Fox | Credited as 21 Laps-Adelstein Productions co-produced with 20th Century Fox Television, Double Wide Productions, NestEgg Productions, Mr. Big Shot Fancy-Pants Productions and Lyonsberry Productions |
| 2014–2015 | Cristela | Cristela Alonzo; Kevin Hench | ABC | Credited as 21 Laps-Adelstein Productions co-produced with 20th Century Fox Television and Hench in the Trench Productions |
| 2016–2025 | Stranger Things | The Duffer Brothers | Netflix | co-produced with Monkey Massacre Productions and Upside Down Pictures |
| 2017 | Imaginary Mary | Adam F. Goldberg; David Guarascio; Patrick Osborne | ABC | uncredited; co-produced with Sony Pictures Television, ABC Studios, Happy Madison Productions, Adam F. Goldberg Productions and David Guarascio Productions |
| 2020 | I Am Not Okay with This | Jonathan Entwistle; Christy Hall | Netflix | co-produced with Ceremony Pictures and Raindrop Valley |
| 2020–present | Unsolved Mysteries | John Cosgrove; Terry Dunn Meurer | Netflix | co-produced with Cosgrove-Meurer Productions |
| 2020 | Dash & Lily | Joe Tracz | Netflix | co-produced with Boy Detective Inc. and Image 32 |
| 2021–2023 | Shadow and Bone | Eric Heisserer | Netflix | co-produced with Chronology and Loom Studios |
| 2022 | Lost Ollie | Shannon Tindle | Netflix | co-produced with Fufufufu Productions |
| 2023 | All the Light We Cannot See | Steven Knight | Netflix | co-produced with Nebula Star |
| 2024 | The Perfect Couple | Jenna Lamia | Netflix | co-produced with Blossom Films, Pathless Woods Productions Inc., Two–Four Two–Four Go and The Jackal Group |
| 2026–present | Stranger Things: Tales from '85 | Eric Robles; Jennifer Muro | Netflix | co-produced with Netflix Animation Studios, Upside Down Pictures and Flying Bark Productions |
Upcoming
| TBA | Real Steel | TBA | Disney+ | co-produced with Compari Entertainment, Angry Films, DreamWorks SKG, and 20th Television |
| TBA | Untitled hockey drama series | Nick Naveda | Netflix | |
| TBA | Persona | Christopher Monfette | Netflix | co-produced with Story Kitchen and Sega |
