= In the Nick of Time =

In the Nick of Time may refer to:

- In the Nick of Time (1991 film), a Christmas television film by George T. Miller
- In the Nick of Time (1911 film), an Australian silent film by Alfred Rolfe
- In the Nick of Time (Australian film) or Let George Do It, a 1938 comedy starring George Wallace
- In the Nick of Time (album), an album by Nicolette Larson
- In the Nick of Time, a 1929 Vitaphone short with Dorothy Hall
- In the Nick of Time, a public clock located in John Frost Square, Newport, Wales, from 1992 to 2008

== See also ==
- Nick of Time (disambiguation)
