= Just-in-time teaching =

Pedagogical strategy

Just-in-time teaching (often abbreviated as JiTT) is a pedagogical strategy that uses feedback between classroom activities and work that students do at home, in preparation for the classroom meeting. The goals are to increase learning during classroom time, to enhance student motivation, to encourage students to prepare for class, and to allow the instructor to fine-tune the classroom activities to best meet students' needs. This should not be confused with just-in-time learning, which itself focuses on immediate connections between learners and the content that is needed at that moment.

== History ==
Just-in-time teaching was developed for university level physics instructors in the late 1990s, but its use has since spread to many other academic disciplines. Early work was done in the physics department at Indiana University – Purdue University Indianapolis (IUPUI) in collaboration with physics instructors at Davidson College and the United States Air Force Academy (USAFA). Subsequently, JiTT was disseminated through a combination of publications, presentations, and workshops. Faculty members teaching in disciplines including biology, chemistry, physics, geology, mathematics, computer science, mechanical engineering, economics, history, English, French, philosophy, journalism, nursing, music, psychology, sociology, and writing have adopted just-in-time teaching. JiTT is used primarily at the college level, although some faculty members have used it at the high school level, and in graduate and professional programs.

== Methodology ==
JiTT may be described as a method by which some or all of the time students spend in preparation for class is used to leverage the quality of the time spent in class. To accomplish this, JiTT relies on pre-class assignments completed by students 1–24 hours before class meetings. These assignments are known variously as "Warmup exercises", "Preflight checks", "Checkpoints", and other names, depending on institutional settings. These assignments are usually completed online, either through a course website, or through a learning management system. The pre-class assignments cover the material that will be introduced in the subsequent class, and should be answered based on students' reading or other preparation. As a result, these assignments provide a strong incentive for students to complete the assigned reading or other preparatory work before class. For this reason, JiTT has been compared to the use of "reading quizzes". However, there are important differences.

Reading quizzes are generally given during class time. Since the pre-class JiTT assignment is completed online, no class time is used. Also, because students have more time to answer the pre-class questions than they do a typical reading quiz, the questions may be more open-ended and thought-provoking. This leads to another significant difference.

Most faculty members make the pre-class assignment due at least 1 hour before class. This allows the faculty member to review the students' answers before class. In most cases, faculty members use this review to make adjustments to the planned classroom activities. If the faculty member feels that the students have mastered a topic, she may reduce or eliminate discussion of that topic during class. Similarly, if the pre-class assignment shows that students have particular difficulties, those difficulties may be addressed more thoroughly in class. These "just-in-time" adjustments lend their name to the technique, just as Just-in-Time business strategies rely on continuous adjustments to parts supplies and product inventory.

Faculty using just-in-time teaching often use quotes from students' responses to the pre-class assignments as "talking points" during the class period. This emphasis on student work as the starting point or as a touchstone during class helps to make the class more student-centered, and promotes interactive learning. To maximize the potential for this use, the questions posed in pre-class assignments should be open-ended and may be somewhat ambiguous.

Taking the full set of methods described above into account, the cycle for a single classroom meeting is as follows.

1. Students complete preparatory reading or other assignments.
2. Students complete a pre-class assignment.
3. The faculty member reviews the assignments and considers adjustments to classroom emphasis, selecting quotes from student work to reference during class.
4. During class, the instructor uses these quotes to lead discussion of the material.
5. Students engage in discussion with the faculty member and one another.
6. Finally, the instructor creates or refines the next pre-class assignment based on the progress made during class.

== Theoretical basis ==
Just-in-time teaching had its origins in the classrooms where faculty were looking for more effective ways to engage a particular audience – non-traditional students. Eventually it found its way into virtually all higher education environments. Initially the pedagogy evolved mostly by trial and error, although, from the start, many JiTT practitioners were paying attention to the education research literature. Over the years JiTT attention shifted to the broader questions of which aspects of the technique worked well, which not so well, and why. In order to answer those questions it is necessary to examine the knowledge about teaching and learning that has accumulated over the past half century.

JiTT assignments and classroom activities are designed to motivate the students to examine their present knowledge and get ready to modify such knowledge, add to it and then apply the newly constructed knowledge. These tasks are accomplished as students and instructors work as a team in a debate-like environment. In this way JiTT is supportive of the three main factors identified by Alexander Astin as contributing to success in college: student-student interaction, student-faculty interaction and time on task.

JiTT learning units start with an examination, by the student, of his/her current knowledge status regarding the topic to be studied, and with an examination of motivational beliefs that determine the student's approach to the topic. This approach is currently favored in any setting, but it is particularly appropriate when the audience is non-traditional students who need to be given some control over what they do to avoid slipping into surface learning which creates a dichotomy between their other (to them meaningful) activities and going to school (not to learn but to get certified for something.)

JiTT activities are designed to foster conceptual change, described in research literature as modification of existing knowledge. In the sciences in particular, learning is seen both as accretion of new knowledge and change of existing knowledge. Preflights have been linked to assessment and feedback, threshold concepts and criterion referencing.

JiTT activities also take into account motivational factors governing student behavior. Motivational belief theorists take the constructivist position that "the process of conceptual change is influenced by personal, motivational, social, and historical processes, thereby advocating a hot model of individual conceptual change". Research has shown that college students who report that their course material is more interesting, important, and useful to them are more likely to use deeper processing strategies like elaboration and metacognitive control strategies. "At the classroom and task level, there are a number of features that could increase students' situational interest – such as challenge, choice, novelty, fantasy, and surprise."

== Outcomes ==
Assessment in just-in-time teaching connotes many ideas. JiTT assignments are themselves a type of formative assessment. They provide students frequent opportunities to consider their understanding of the material, and they provide faculty a regular sightline into their students' progress towards deeper learning. Successful implementation of JiTT leads to cognitive gains, ranging from moderate to quite significant. Success depends critically on the teacher and students' total buy-in. If students see the on-line assignments merely as an add-on to the course, to be completed perfunctorily in the shortest time possible and then discussed briefly at the beginning of class, before the "real" lecture, they will resent the extra work and will not get any additional benefit from JiTT. Teachers using JiTT report a spectrum of results, ranging from significant affective and cognitive gains to very negative student reactions, disillusionment, and sometimes a regression in learning gains.

An example of successful JiTT comes from a five-semester study at North Georgia College & State University. This study analyzed responses from four force concept inventory (FCI) questions (the distractors as well as the correct answers) for evidence of students reaching the transition threshold from "common sense thinking to Newtonian thinking", a well-defined notion in physics education. Sixty-one percent of the students in the JiTT class reached the threshold, compared to only seven percent in the traditionally taught class. Marrs reported similar gains on pre-post assessment in biology, using the Hake metric, defined as (posttest% – pretest%)/(100% – pretest%). With traditional lecture-based pedagogy the gain was 16.7%; the gain jumped to 52.3% with JiTT and to 63.6% with collaborative learning.

Since the introduction of JiTT at the US Air Force Academy, the final exam questions in the introductory physics sequence have shifted significantly towards conceptual probing for deeper understanding. Analyzing carefully kept records from the pre-JiTT early 1990s until the present, one finds that despite the increasingly more challenging questions, the scores have held steady and even improved in some semesters.

When JiTT was introduced in introductory physics at IUPUI in 1996 course attendance increased from under 50% to over 80%. Instructors in other disciplines have reported similar results. Better attendance inevitably leads to fewer students dropping the class and an overall rise in grades. In JiTT Physics and in Biology courses at IUPUI the D/F/W numbers decreased from 40% to under 25%.

JiTT can make a difference in student study skills. Students in Marrs' biology class credit JiTT to a significant decrease in cramming for tests. She asked her students "Did you put off studying for Biotech 540 and as a result 'cram' for Biotech 540 tests?" to her graduate students, and 34% answered yes. However, 62% of the class answered in affirmative to the question "Do you 'cram' for other courses that you have this semester?" Gavrin reported that 80% of the students in his JiTT class responded "yes" to "Do the JiTT exercises help you to be well prepared for lecture?" versus 21% affirmative to the same question in "other classes". He found a 58% vs. 18% split on "staying focused", a 59% vs. 18% split on "feeling like an active participant", and a 71% vs. 21% split on "finding classroom time useful". When trying to assess the efficacy of any pedagogical strategy, it is important to appreciate that the choice and implementation of a particular teaching method will affect student and faculty attitudes and motivation as well as learning outcomes. In her use of JiTT at Penn State Brandywine, Laura Guertin has noticed strongly positive reactions from her students:

I see my students working weekly through open-ended questions that require higher-order cognitive skills. I saw students working together in class, gaining additional practice with quantitative, communication, and management skills. I see my students using the vocabulary of the discipline as they work through JiTT exercises and discuss JiTT responses in class. I see students connecting ideas across the course and across their lives (Guertin, 2010).

== See also ==
- Just-in-time learning
- Peer instruction
- Peer-led team learning (PLTL)
- SCALE-UP
