= Nick of Time =

Nick of Time may refer to:

== Film and television ==
- Nick of Time (film), a 1995 thriller film by John Badham
- "Nick of Time" (The Twilight Zone), a 1960 episode of The Twilight Zone

== Music ==
- Nick of Time (album), 1989, by Bonnie Raitt
  - "Nick of Time" (song), the title song
- "Nick of Time", a 1988 song by AC/DC from Blow Up Your Video
- "Nick of Time", a 2004 song by Marcin Rozynek from Następny Będziesz Ty
- "The Nick of Time", a 2016 instrumental by Michael Giacchino from Zootopia

== Literature ==
- The Nick of Time, a 2002 novel by Francis King
- The Nick of Time: Essays on Haiku Aesthetics, a 2001 collection of essays about haiku by Paul O. Williams
- The Nick of Time, a 1985 science fiction novel by George Alec Effinger
- Nick of Time, a 2008 novel by Ted Bell

== Other uses ==
- Nick of Time, an unreleased computer game by The Dreamers Guild

== See also ==
- In the Nick of Time (disambiguation)
