= Just-in-time learning =

Type of individual or organizational learning

Just-in-time learning is an approach to individual or organizational learning and development that promotes need-related training be readily available exactly when and how it is needed by the learner.

== Methodology ==
Just-in-time learning is different from structured training or scheduled professional development, both of which are generally available at set dates and times. What makes just-in-time learning unique is a strategy focused on meeting the learner's need when it arises, rather than pre-scheduled education sessions that occur regardless of the immediacy or scope of need. Therefore, planning for just-in-time learning requires anticipating what is needed by the various learners, when and where they may be when they experience the need, and the creation of content oriented toward meeting those needs in ways that are focused and accessible.

The learning that is provided in a just-in-time format is often by short online videos, targeted elearning, printed and accessible job aids, or related real-world information. It is timed and packaged to meet one explicit need and nothing else, so as not to overwhelm the learner with anything that does not meet the immediate need. Information can be provided through traditional paper, online, or through mobile devices depending upon need and availability. It is essential that the information is findable and understandable by the person who needs it; otherwise the person will become distracted or lose focus and defeats the benefits of just-in-time learning. Meeting only the immediate need helps with knowledge retention and promotes feelings of empowerment. Therefore, one of the criteria used to assess learning is the speed of connecting the person who needs something with the learning that helps get it done.

== Success criteria ==
That just-in-time learning is often conflated with reusable learning objects implies that similar success criteria may be applied to them. Evidence of successful use of just-in-time learning includes higher learner satisfaction, decreased costs, and even increased patient-centered outcomes when implemented within health settings.

== See also ==
- Just-in-time teaching
- Experiential learning
