= Just in Time (film) =

- DVD cover
- Directed by: Shawn Levy
- Written by: Eric Tuchman
- Produced by: David Blangsted; Lori Petersen; Don Schain
- Starring: Mark Moses; Rebecca Chambers; Brittany Alyse Smith
- Cinematography: Matthew Williams
- Edited by: David Blangsted; Lori Petersen
- Music by: Jay Gruska
- Production company: Leucadia Film Corporation
- Distributed by: Feature Films for Families
- Release date: 1997
- Running time: 95 minutes
- Country: United States
- Language: English

Just in Time is a 1997 American romantic comedy-drama film directed by Shawn Levy and written by Eric Tuchman. This was the second feature film directed by Levy, who went on to direct Night at the Museum (2006) and Date Night (2010).

== Cast ==
- Mark Moses as Michael Bedford
- Rebecca Chambers as Faith Zacarelli
- Jane Sibbett as Brenda Hyatt
- Steven Eckholdt as Jake Bedford
- Brittany Alyse Smith as Lily Bedford
- Micole Mercurio as Dotty Zacarelli
- Scott Ditty as Richie
- Rosalind Soulam as Roberta
- Frank Gerrish as Big Frank
- Dennis Saylor as Jerry
- Micaela Nelligan as Thaler
- Jeff Olson as Pipkin
- Shawn Levy as Photographer

== Production ==
Parts of the film were shot in Salt Lake City, Utah.
