= Atomic Monster =

American film and television production company

- Logo used since 2016
- Type: Subsidiary
- Industry: Film; Television
- Founded: October 21, 2014; 12 years ago
- Founder: James Wan
- Headquarters: Los Angeles, California, United States
- Key people: James Wan; Michael Clear; Judson Scott; Rob Hackett; Alayna Glasthal; Danielle Bozzone; Samuel Zimmerman
- Parent: Blumhouse Atomic
- Website: atomicmonster.com

Atomic Monster is an American independent film and television production company founded by James Wan on October 21, 2014. The company is known for producing The Conjuring Universe and M3GAN franchises, as well as Lights Out, Mortal Kombat, Malignant, The Monkey, and Backrooms.

== History ==
James Wan founded Atomic Monster on October 21, 2014, with the company signing a first-look deal with New Line Cinema and Warner Bros. Pictures. On June 17, 2015, it was announced that Michael Clear was hired to run the company with Wan. On August 12, 2016, the company reached a development deal with Chinese company Starlight Media Inc. to help finance films with budgets up to $100 million.

On November 16, 2022, it was announced that the company was in talks to merge with Blumhouse Productions with the company having a shared first-look deal with Universal Pictures. The companies would continue to operate as separate labels, with each maintaining its own creative autonomy and brand identity. The company is using the existing Blumhouse infrastructure to further scale their activities in film, television and new content areas, such as horror-related video games, live entertainment, and audio. On January 2, 2024, the merger was finalized.

On June 4, 2025, it was announced that Blumhouse was in talks to acquire Twisted Pictures' stake in the Saw franchise, with Lionsgate still being involved. Later that month, the acquisition was finalized, and the deal would have Wan and Leigh Whannell regain creative control for the future of the franchise. On December 9, 2025, Divide/Conquer signed a first-look deal with Blumhouse Atomic Monster.

On January 21, 2026, Blumhouse Atomic Monster appointed Shudder's Samuel Zimmerman as Senior Vice President of Development and Acquisitions. Zimmerman is overseeing a focused slate of feature films from emerging filmmakers, reporting to Blumhouse President Abhijay Prakash and Atomic Monster President Michael Clear, alongside Divide/Conquer. Zimmerman is also producing and/or overseeing films in the $2-8 million budget range for both companies. On September 30, 2026, the company signed a multi-year deal with Closer Media. The companies would develop and co-finance a slate of lower-budgeted original films. On November 3, 2026, the company was renamed to Blumhouse Atomic. That same month, the company signed a first-look producing deal with Gary Dauberman and his production company Coin Operated.

== Feature films ==
Release date	Title	Director(s)	Distributor
October 3, 2014	Annabelle	John R. Leonetti	Warner Bros. Pictures
June 10, 2016	The Conjuring 2	James Wan	Warner Bros. Pictures
July 22, 2016	Lights Out	David F. Sandberg	Warner Bros. Pictures
August 11, 2017	Annabelle: Creation	David F. Sandberg	Warner Bros. Pictures
September 7, 2018	The Nun	Corin Hardy	Warner Bros. Pictures
April 19, 2019	The Curse of La Llorona	Michael Chaves	Warner Bros. Pictures
June 26, 2019	Annabelle Comes Home	Gary Dauberman	Warner Bros. Pictures
April 23, 2021	Mortal Kombat	Simon McQuoid	Warner Bros. Pictures
June 4, 2021	The Conjuring: The Devil Made Me Do It	Michael Chaves	Warner Bros. Pictures
September 10, 2021	Malignant	James Wan	Warner Bros. Pictures
October 6, 2021	There's Someone Inside Your House	Patrick Brice	Netflix
January 6, 2023	M3GAN	Gerard Johnstone	Universal Pictures
September 8, 2023	The Nun II	Michael Chaves	Warner Bros. Pictures
December 22, 2023	Aquaman and the Lost Kingdom	James Wan	Warner Bros. Pictures
January 5, 2024	Night Swim	Bryce McGuire	Universal Pictures
October 3, 2024	'Salem's Lot	Gary Dauberman	Warner Bros. Pictures
February 21, 2025	The Monkey	Osgood Perkins	Neon
June 27, 2025	M3GAN 2.0	Gerard Johnstone	Universal Pictures
September 5, 2025	The Conjuring: Last Rites	Michael Chaves	Warner Bros. Pictures
April 17, 2026	Lee Cronin's The Mummy	Lee Cronin	Warner Bros. Pictures
May 8, 2026	Mortal Kombat II	Simon McQuoid	Warner Bros. Pictures
May 29, 2026	Backrooms	Kane Parsons	A24
August 1, 2026	Soulm8te	Kate Dolan	Universal Pictures Home Entertainment
August 21, 2026	Insidious: Out of the Further	Jacob Chase	Sony Pictures Releasing
September 10, 2026	The Uprising	Paul Greengrass	Focus Features
September 15, 2026	The Last Kiss	Yoko Okumura	Universal Pictures Home Entertainment
October 9, 2026	Other Mommy	Rob Savage	Universal Pictures

=== Upcoming films ===
Release date	Title	Director(s)	Distributor	Ref.
January 15, 2027	River	Joshua Giuliano	Universal Pictures	
February 26, 2027	The Revenge of La Llorona	Santiago Menghini	Warner Bros. Pictures	
March 12, 2027	The Exorcist: Martyrs	Mike Flanagan	Universal Pictures	
April 2, 2027	Play House	Nicolas Curcio	Focus Features	
May 7, 2027	Anything but Ghosts	Curry Barker	Focus Features	
August 13, 2027	Untitled film	—N/a	Universal Pictures	
August 27, 2027	Molepeople	Ben Wheatley	Paramount Pictures	
September 10, 2027	The Conjuring: First Communion	Rodrigue Huart	Warner Bros. Pictures	
September 24, 2027	Blair Witch Project	Dylan Clark	Lionsgate	
October 8, 2027	Sleepover	Jacob Chase	Universal Pictures	
October 22, 2027	Paranormal Activity	Ian Tuason	Paramount Pictures	
November 12, 2027	Seasons	Drew Hancock	Amazon MGM Studios	
October 27, 2028	Untitled film	—N/a	Universal Pictures	

=== Undated films ===
Title	Director(s)	Distributor	Ref.
Occupant	Joshua Giuliano	Focus Features	

== Television series ==
Year	Title	Creator(s)	Network
2016–2021	MacGyver	Peter M. Lenkov	CBS
2019	Swamp Thing	Gary Dauberman; Mark Verheiden	DC Universe
2021	Aquaman: King of Atlantis	Victor Courtright; Marly Halpern-Graser	HBO Max
2021	I Know What You Did Last Summer	Sara Goodman	Amazon Prime Video
2022	Archive 81	Rebecca Sonnenshine	Netflix
2022	Samurai Rabbit: The Usagi Chronicles	Candie Kelty Langdale; Doug Langdale	Netflix
2024	Teacup	Ian McCulloch	Peacock
2025	True Haunting	—N/a	Netflix
2025	The Copenhagen Test	Thomas Brandon	Peacock
2026	56 Days	Karyn Usher; Lisa Zwerling	Amazon Prime Video
