= Stephanie Perkins =

American author

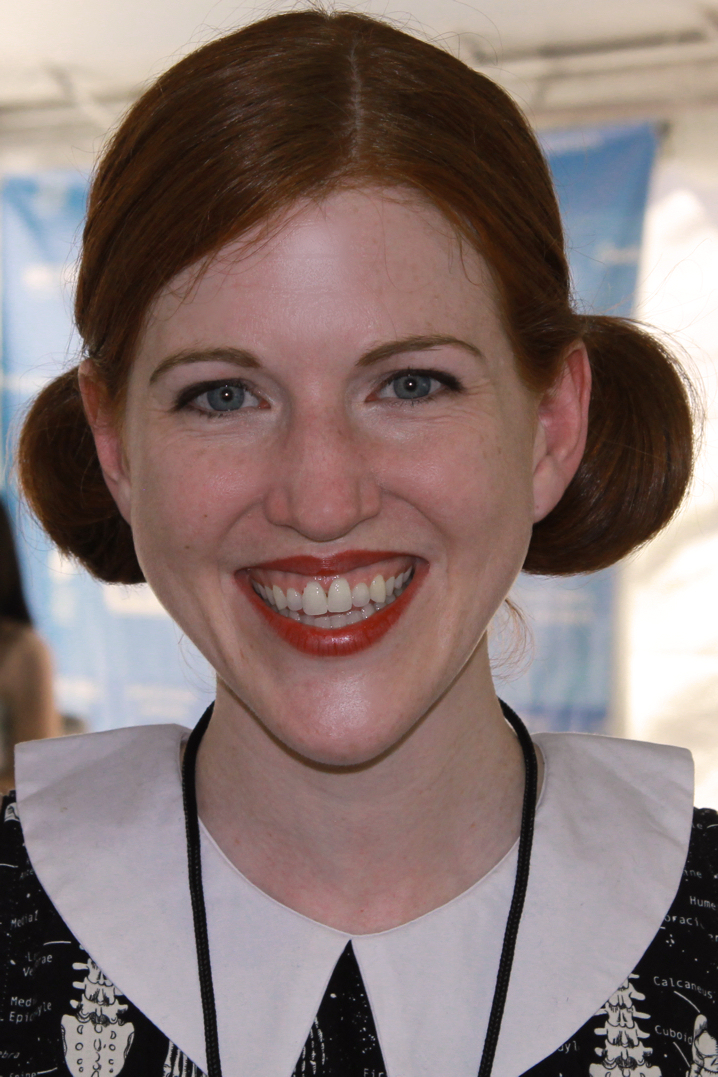
- Perkins at the 2014 Texas Book Festival
- Born: South Carolina, United States
- Occupation: Novelist
- Writing career
- Genres: Young Adult, Contemporary, Horror
- Website: stephanieperkins.com

Stephanie Perkins is an American author, known for her books Anna and the French Kiss, Lola and the Boy Next Door, The New York Times bestseller Isla and the Happily Ever After, and, There's Someone Inside Your House, the latter of which was adapted into a film of the same name by Netflix.

== Career ==
Perkins was born in South Carolina. During her formative years, she lived in Arizona with her family, and attended universities in California and Georgia. After spending a year living in San Francisco, she moved away to live with her husband, Jarrod Perkins in Asheville, North Carolina.

== Bibliography ==
=== Fiction ===
- Anna and the French Kiss (2010)
- Lola and the Boy Next Door (2011)
- Isla and the Happily Ever After (2014)
- There's Someone Inside Your House (2017)
- The Woods Are Always Watching (2021)

== Anthologies ==
- My True Love Gave To Me: Twelve Holiday Stories (2014)
- Summer Days and Summer Nights: Twelve Love Stories (2016)

== Awards ==
- Listen Up Award (2012, for Lola and the Boy Next Door)
- YALSA's Best Fiction for Young Adults (2012, Lola and the Boy Next Door)
