= Sidney Franklin =

Sidney Franklin may refer to:

- Sidney Franklin (actor, born 1870) (1870–1931), American stage and screen actor
- Sidney Franklin (actor, born 1990), American actor and tap dancer
- Sidney Franklin (bullfighter) (1903–1976), American bullfighter
- Sidney Franklin (director) (1893–1972), American film director and producer
