= Shazam! (film) =

2019 DC Comics superhero film

- Theatrical release poster
- Directed by: David F. Sandberg
- Screenplay by: Henry Gayden
- Story by: Henry Gayden; Darren Lemke
- Based on: Characters from DC
- Produced by: Peter Safran
- Starring: Zachary Levi; Mark Strong; Asher Angel; Jack Dylan Grazer; Djimon Hounsou
- Cinematography: Maxime Alexandre
- Edited by: Michel Aller
- Music by: Benjamin Wallfisch
- Production companies: New Line Cinema; DC Films; The Safran Company; Seven Bucks Productions
- Distributed by: Warner Bros. Pictures
- Release dates: March 28, 2019 (TCL Chinese Theater); April 5, 2019 (United States)
- Running time: 132 minutes
- Country: United States
- Language: English
- Budget: $90–100 million
- Box office: $367.8 million

Shazam! is a 2019 American superhero film based on the DC character Shazam. Produced by New Line Cinema, DC Films, the Safran Company, and Seven Bucks Productions, and distributed by Warner Bros. Pictures, it is the seventh installment in the DC Extended Universe (DCEU). It was directed by David F. Sandberg from a screenplay by Henry Gayden who co-wrote the story with Darren Lemke, and stars Zachary Levi, Mark Strong, Asher Angel, Jack Dylan Grazer, and Djimon Hounsou. The film follows teenager Billy Batson (Angel) as he is chosen by the ancient wizard Shazam (Hounsou) to be his new champion by saying the name "Shazam", allowing him to transform into an adult superhero (Levi) with various superpowers. Billy and his foster brother Freddy Freeman (Grazer) must discover Billy's new powers in order to stop the evil Dr. Thaddeus Sivana (Strong) and the Seven Deadly Sins.

Development of a live-action Shazam! film began at New Line in the early 2000s, but was delayed for several years. The film went into pre-production in 2009, with Peter Segal as director, John August as writer and Dwayne Johnson being considered to star as the anti-hero Black Adam, but the project fell through; Johnson acts as an executive producer on Shazam! William Goldman, Alec Sokolow, Joel Cohen, Bill Birch, and Geoff Johns, among others, were all attached to the project as writers at various points. The film was officially announced in 2014, with Johnson attached to star as either Shazam or Black Adam. In January 2017, he was cast to lead a solo Black Adam development project. Sandberg signed on to direct Shazam! in February 2017, and Levi was cast that October, with Angel joining the following month. Principal photography began in Toronto on January 29, 2018, with most of the film shot at Pinewood Toronto Studios, and wrapped on May 11.

Shazam! was released in the United States on April 5, 2019. The film received positive reviews from critics and was a box office success, grossing $367.8 million worldwide. It was followed by a sequel titled Shazam! Fury of the Gods (2023) and a spin-off film Black Adam (2022), both of which failed to meet the critical and financial success of the first film.

== Plot ==
In 1974 in Upstate New York, young Thaddeus Sivana is riding in a car with his abusive father and elder brother Sid during a snowstorm, while being constantly mocked and verbally harassed by both of them. He is suddenly transported to the Rock of Eternity, a mystic temple located in another dimension.

There, Thaddeus meets the ancient wizard Shazam, who has spent centuries searching for someone pure of heart upon whom to bestow his powers and name as champion after his previous one unleashed the Seven Deadly Sins. Thaddeus is tempted by the Sins, who promise him power if he frees them. The wizard deems Thaddeus unworthy and magically returns him to the car. His frustration and confusion leads to a crash, resulting in his father becoming paraplegic and even more resentful towards him. The Sins send Thaddeus a message via his 8-Ball toy, telling him to find them.

In present-day Fawcett City, Philadelphia, 14-year-old foster child Billy Batson continually runs away from foster homes to search for his birth mother, whom he has been seeking ever since being separated from her at a carnival 10 years ago. He locks some police officers in a store to use their computer to locate her, but is unsuccessful. A social worker places Billy in a group home run by Víctor and Rosa Vásquez. They both had been in the system and have five other foster children: "den mother" Mary Bromfield, shy Pedro Peña, obsessive gamer Eugene Choi, energetic Darla Dudley, and superhero enthusiast Freddy Freeman.

Elsewhere, an embittered Sivana succeeds in his lifelong quest to return to the Rock of Eternity. He becomes the Sins' vessel through a magical orb that replaces one of his eyes, allowing him to easily overpower the wizard. He promptly uses his newfound powers to kill his father, Sid, and Sivana Industries' board of directors. Billy defends Freddy from bullies at school and is pursued into a subway car, where he is transported to the Rock of Eternity. The dying wizard chooses him as his new champion; by saying "Shazam," Billy transforms into an adult superhero. He then vanishes, leaving his magical staff behind.

Freddy is taken into Billy's confidence and helps him explore his newfound powers, which include superhuman strength, near-invulnerability, superspeed, and electrokinesis. By saying "Shazam" again, he can return to his normal body. Freddy posts viral videos of the new superhero, and Billy starts skipping school to use his powers to busk for money and fame. He gets into an argument with Freddy over his irresponsible attitude after accidentally endangering, then saving, a bus full of people.

Sivana arrives and swiftly defeats Billy with his magic, causing him to panic and lose confidence; he escapes only after accidentally discovering that he can fly. He learns his biological mother's location and visits her, only to be heartbroken upon learning she abandoned him at the carnival intentionally after feeling inadequate as a teenage mother and no longer wanting him in her life.

Sivana deduces Billy's identity and takes his foster siblings hostage; Billy agrees to transfer his powers to him in exchange for their safety. They go to the Rock of Eternity to use the wizard's staff to effect the transfer, but the children attack Sivana. Billy observes that Sivana becomes vulnerable when all seven Sins leave his body. Sivana pursues them to a winter carnival and unleashes the Sins upon the crowd. Remembering the wizard's words, Billy uses the staff to share his powers with his foster siblings, transforming them into adult superheroes like him before he breaks the staff in half. The Shazam Family battles against the Sins while Billy faces down Sivana. He goads Envy into leaving Sivana powerless and recaptures the Sins after forcefully pulling the Eye out of Sivana's head. Billy and his foster siblings are hailed as heroes.

Returning the Sins to their prison, they realize they can use the Rock of Eternity as their superhero headquarters. Billy finally accepts his foster parents and siblings as his "real" family. In his superhero form, he has lunch with his siblings at school, revealing to Freddy's surprise that he has also invited Superman.

In a mid-credits scene, the imprisoned Sivana is approached by a talking caterpillar (Note: Identified offscreen as Mister Mind.) who proposes an alliance. The post-credits scene features a silly banter between Shazam and Freddy.

== Cast ==
- Zachary Levi and Asher Angel as Billy Batson / Shazam: A 14-year-old boy and the superpowered champion of the wizard with whom he shares his name, who possesses "the wisdom of Solomon, the strength of Hercules, the stamina of Atlas, the power of Zeus, the courage of Achilles, and the speed of Mercury".
  - David Kohlsmith plays the four-year-old Billy.
- Mark Strong as Dr. Thaddeus Sivana: A misanthropic scientist rejected as the wizard's champion for his impure heart, who becomes a host for the Seven Deadly Sins and Shazam's nemesis. Strong previously portrayed Sinestro in the 2011 film Green Lantern, making Shazam! his second appearance in a film based on DC characters.
  - Ethan Pugiotto plays the young Thaddeus.
- Jack Dylan Grazer as Freddy Freeman: Billy's physically disabled foster brother and a fan of superheroes, who mentors Billy on the use of his newfound powers.
  - Adam Brody plays the character's adult superhero form.
- Djimon Hounsou as Shazam: The last surviving member of the Council of Wizards, who has spent centuries summoning people to his temple, the Rock of Eternity, in search of a "pure of heart" champion to whom he can pass on his extraordinary faculties. Hounsou previously voiced King Ricou of the Fisherman in the DCEU film Aquaman (2018).
- Faithe Herman as Darla Dudley: Billy's good-natured younger foster sister.
  - Meagan Good plays the character's adult superhero form.
- Grace Fulton as Mary Bromfield: Billy's mature, academically driven older foster sister.
  - Michelle Borth plays the character's adult superhero form.
- Ian Chen as Eugene Choi: Billy's younger foster brother, an obsessive gamer and techie.
  - Ross Butler plays the character's adult superhero form.
- Jovan Armand as Pedro Peña: Billy's older foster brother, a shy, sensitive boy who has trouble opening up.
  - D. J. Cotrona plays the character's adult superhero form.
- Marta Milans as Rosa Vásquez: The foster mother of Billy and his siblings.
- Cooper Andrews as Víctor Vásquez: The foster father of Billy and his siblings.

The film also features John Glover as Thaddeus Sivana's estranged father and CEO of Sivana Industries. Glover had starred in other DC Comics series and films: Batman: The Animated Series, The New Batman Adventures, and Superman: The Animated Series as The Riddler; Dr. Jason Woodrue in the 1997 film Batman and Robin; and Lionel Luthor in Smallville. Natalia Safran was cast as Thaddeus' mother, though her scenes were cut from the film. Caroline Palmer portrays Marilyn Batson, Billy's biological mother. Wayne Ward and Landon Doak portray Sid Sivana, Thaddeus' bullying brother as an adult and a teenager, respectively. Carson MacCormac and Evan Marsh portray Brett and Burke Breyer, bullies at the children's school.

Director David F. Sandberg makes cameo appearances performing as each of the three Crocodile-Men (collaboratively assisted by Steve Newburn and Ned Morill), and provides the voice of the alien lifeform Mister Mind during a mid-credits sequence. Sandberg's wife, actress Lotta Losten, portrays Dr. Lynn Crosby; a researcher working with Dr. Sivana, who is killed by him. Sound designer Bill R. Dean has an uncredited cameo, providing the voice for a Batman toy, while Ryan Hadley, Zachary Levi's stunt double, appears uncredited as a body double for Superman. Hadley's appearance is a silent cameo, where the character is only seen from the neck down, due to Henry Cavill being unavailable to film the scene. Executive producer Dwayne Johnson's likeness is used for the mystically generated holograph of Teth-Adam, which the wizard Shazam conjures while teaching Billy the history of the Rock of Eternity, the Seven Realms of Magic, and his previous Champion, teased ahead of Johnson's appearance as the character in Black Adam.

The Seven Deadly Sins – a supernatural team of villains consisting of the demons Pride, Envy, Greed, Lust, Wrath, Gluttony, and Sloth – were portrayed by stunt doubles in motion capture suits on-set during filming, and depicted on-screen through CGI special effects. Their voices were collectively provided by actors Steve Blum, Darin De Paul, and Fred Tatasciore; Tatasciore previously voiced the Seven Sins in the direct-to-video Lego DC Super Hero Girls: Super-Villain High. In an Easter egg appearance, Andi Osho reprises her role as social worker Emma Glover from Sandberg's debut film Lights Out.

== Production ==
=== Development and pre-production ===
New Line Cinema began development of a Shazam! live-action feature film in the early 2000s, with multiple screenplay drafts, by William Goldman, the team of Alec Sokolow and Joel Cohen, Bryan Goluboff, and John August. The version of the Shazam! script written by August, which went into pre-production in 2008, was an action-comedy that focused on the origin story of the hero, then known by his original name of Captain Marvel. His young alter ego, Billy Batson. Peter Segal was attached as director and Dwayne Johnson was in talks to appear as the film's villain, Black Adam.

New Line Cinema was absorbed into Warner Bros., a larger film studio also owned at the time by Time Warner, during the course of development. Following the success of Warner's Batman film The Dark Knight and the commercial failure of its lighter, family-friendly Speed Racer, both during the summer of 2008, August departed from the project, citing pressure from the studio to make the screenplay darker and more serious. In August 2009, Bill Birch and Geoff Johns, a prominent DC writer, were assigned to write the screenplay, while Segal remained attached as director. In August 2010, the studio considered cancelling the theatrical film in favour of a live-action series for prime time network television. In December 2013, Segal stated that the film would not be happening, as the similarities between Captain Marvel and Superman had become an obstacle after the successful launch of Man of Steel earlier that year.

While the film was in development limbo, DC rebooted the comic book franchise as part of their New 52 relaunch in 2012. Due to the trademark conflicts with Marvel Comics, who owned the trademark for "Captain Marvel" for use with their own character of the same name, DC renamed their Captain Marvel superhero character "Shazam" at this time when the New 52 started. DC had been required to market and promote the character using the trademark Shazam!, since acquiring the publishing rights from Fawcett Comics in 1972. Captain Marvel had originated at Fawcett in 1939, but fell into limbo after 1953 following a long legal battle with DC over Captain Marvel's similarities to Superman.

In April 2014, Warner Bros. revealed their upcoming slate of films based on DC properties: Shazam!, Metal Men, Fables, and 100 Bullets. The Shazam! film was tentatively set for release in July 2016. Dwayne Johnson stated he would be starring in Shazam! that August. In September, Johnson was cast as Black Adam, while Darren Lemke was set to write the script. In January 2017, Henry Gayden was hired to rewrite Lemke's script. In February 2017, David F. Sandberg was in talks with the studio to direct Shazam!, while Dwayne Johnson was set to star in a Black Adam solo film, as opposed to appearing as the villain in Shazam!, while Doctor Sivana, another nemesis of Shazam, became the Shazam! film's main villain. Sandberg was also approached to direct Venom for Sony Pictures, but Sandberg finally decided to direct Shazam! rather than Venom due to the former's crew consisting of several people Sandberg had worked with at New Line Cinema.

By July 2017, the studio had begun active development on Shazam! and Sandberg was confirmed as director, with production to begin in early 2018. Dwayne Johnson relayed that a different creative team was now involved than when he first signed on to the film. After being cast as the lead, Zachary Levi stated in an interview, "the idea is that it's gonna feel like the movie Big, but with super powers," when was asked about the direction DC Films and New Line Cinema are going for with Shazam! Warner Bros. stated that the film would be based on the 2012–2013 Shazam! backup feature from the Justice League comic book, by writer Geoff Johns and artist Gary Frank, which told a modernized version of Shazam's origin.

In August 2017, director David F. Sandberg stated that the film would be the next to shoot in the DC universe, and by the end of the month, it had begun pre-production. By October 2017, cinematographer Maxime Alexandre and production designer Jennifer Spence, who previously collaborated with Sandberg on Annabelle: Creation, were added to the production. The next month, Aquaman stunt coordinator Kyle Gardiner was hired to work on the film's action sequences. On January 12, 2018, the film's release date was announced as April 19, 2019, later moved to April 5.

=== Casting ===
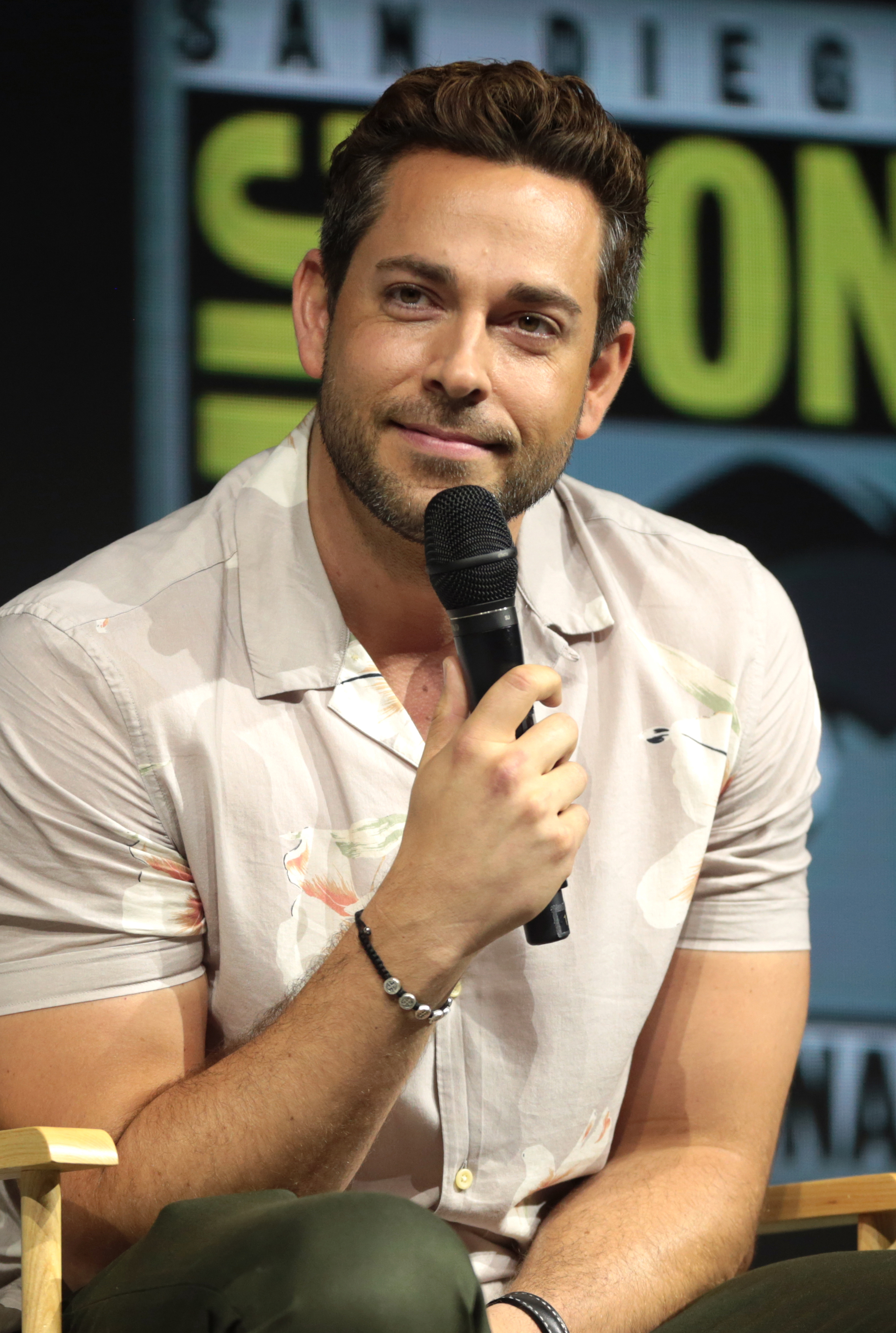
Zachary Levi at 2018 San Diego Comic-Con

In August 2017, the casting process for Shazam and other characters had begun. Sandberg had stated in an interview that instead of de-aging an actor using special effects or computer-generated imagery, he would cast both a child actor and an adult actor for the role of the main character. John Cena, Zane Holtz, Jake McDorman, Derek Theler and Billy Magnussen all met with and/or auditioned for Sandberg for the adult version of Billy Batson/Shazam. Zachary Levi auditioned for the adult version of Freddy Freeman, Billy Batson's brother.

By October 2017, Levi was cast in the titular role. Sandberg chose Levi out of 100 actors after seeing his audition (which was taped on his iPhone). In November, Grace Fulton joined the cast as Mary Bromfield, one of Billy Batson's foster siblings. Fulton had previously worked with the same director on Annabelle: Creation. Later that month, Mark Strong was in final negotiations to play Dr. Sivana. Strong confirmed he would be playing the role by January 2018. By November 2017, Asher Angel was cast as the titular hero's teenage originator Billy Batson. Finn Wolfhard also auditioned for the part. In December, Jack Dylan Grazer was added as Freddy Freeman, Batson's best friend. Later that month, Jovan Armand, Ian Chen, Faithe Herman, and Cooper Andrews were cast as Pedro Peña, Eugene Choi, and Darla Dudley, respectively, with Andrews portraying Víctor Vásquez, one of Billy Batson's foster parents.

By January 2018, Ron Cephas Jones entered talks to play the role of the wizard Shazam, who granted Batson his powers. Later that month, Spanish actress Marta Milans joined the cast to play Rosa Vásquez, one of the foster parents at the home where Billy lives. By the end of January 2018, actress Lotta Losten, the wife of director David F. Sandberg, revealed that she had a role in the film. On April 23, 2018, Ross Butler was announced to have joined the cast. By July, Djimon Hounsou had replaced Jones as Shazam, due to Jones having scheduling conflicts. Henry Cavill was in talks to reprise his role as Superman from previous DCEU films for a cameo, but was unable to because of scheduling.

=== Filming ===
Principal photography for Shazam! began in Toronto and Hamilton, in Ontario, Canada on January 29, 2018, under the working title Franklin, and wrapped by mid-May 2018. The film was set primarily in Philadelphia and is firmly established within the DCEU. Most of the production was shot at Pinewood Toronto Studios, and also several public locations around the city, including the University of Toronto, Woodbine Shopping Centre, and Hearn Generating Station. In early March 2018, filming took place at Fort York National Historic Site in downtown Toronto. By early May 2018, Asher Angel, among other young cast members, had finished filming his part, and principal photography wrapped on May 11, 2018. Reshoots and additional photography took place in Toronto between November and December 2018. Scenes set at the Philadelphia Museum of Art, and well as other location work such as footage of the skyline and aerial shots, were filmed in the city of Philadelphia in December 2018. Shazam! had a production budget of $90–100 million (and about $102 million once post-production was complete), making it the least expensive DCEU film to-date.

=== Visual effects and editing ===
David F. Sandberg's two-time collaborator Michel Aller served as the editor for Shazam! Mike Wassel (Hellboy II: The Golden Army and the Fast & Furious franchise) and Kelvin McIlwain (Aquaman) were the overall visual effects supervisors for the film. Technicolor's VFX studios Mr. X (known for The Shape of Water and Tron: Legacy) and Moving Picture Company (MPC) provided visual effects. Rodeo FX, DNEG, Digital Domain, and Rise FX also worked on the VFX.

== Music ==
On July 21, 2018, Benjamin Wallfisch was announced as the composer for Shazam!, marking his third collaboration with director David F. Sandberg after previously scoring Sandberg's Lights Out and Annabelle: Creation. Wallfisch had also provided additional music for Batman v Superman: Dawn of Justice, the second film in the DC Extended Universe.

Wallfisch mentioned John Williams and scores from 1980s Amblin Entertainment films as inspirations for Shazam!, to match the tone of a film about "an old-school superhero from the Golden Age" In writing the score, Wallfisch stated that he was "picturing what might happen if a 14-year-old was put in front of a 100 piece orchestra and told there were no limits. I wanted the score to feel like it might have been written by an exuberant kid just having the time of his life with an orchestra."

== Marketing ==
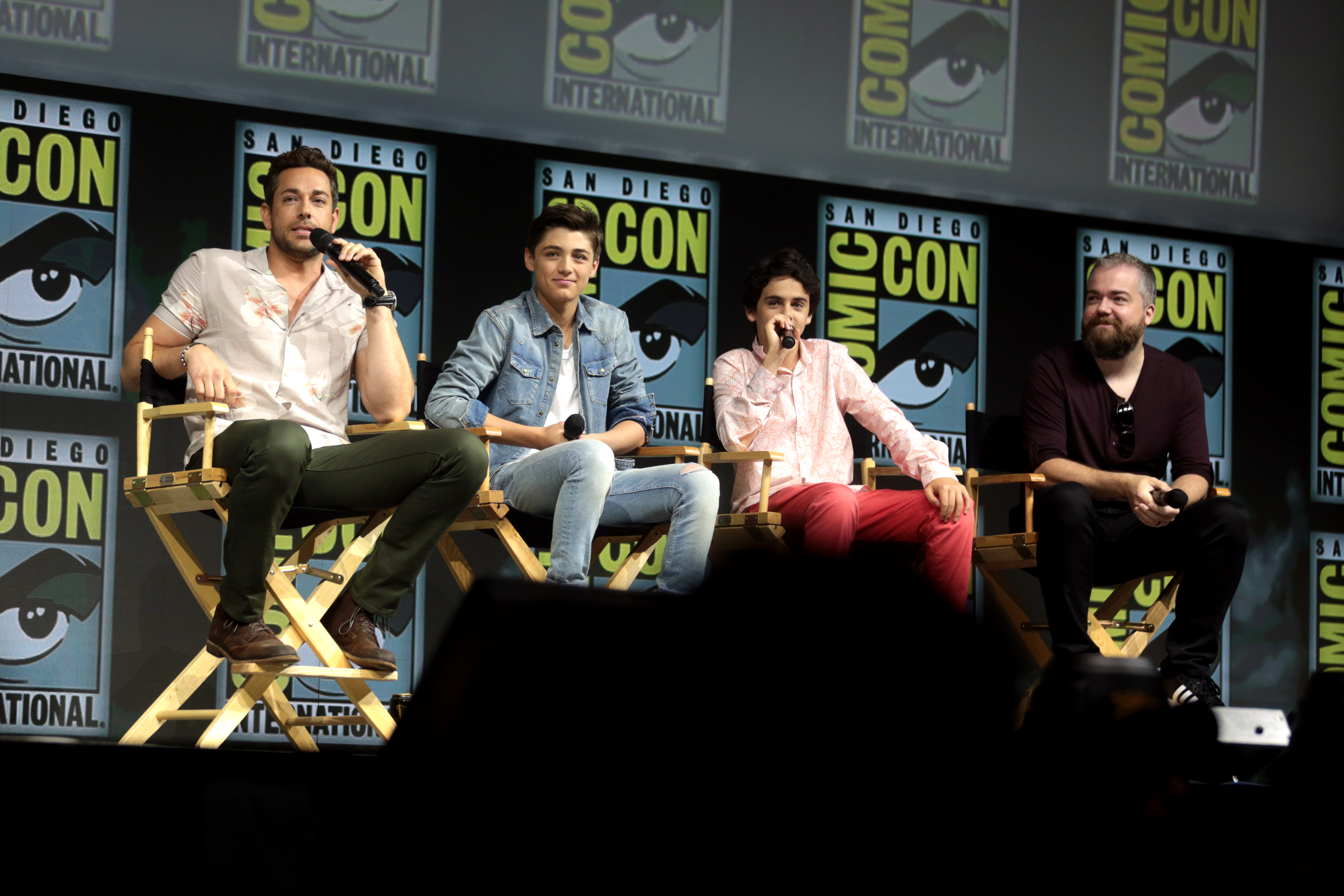
(L:R) Zachary Levi, Asher Angel, Jack Dylan Grazer, and David F. Sandberg promoting Shazam! at the 2018 San Diego Comic-Con

In April 2018, a first look at Shazam! was shown at the CinemaCon convention in Las Vegas, Nevada, as director David F. Sandberg introduced behind-the-scene footage. During an interview with the podcast Film Riot in June 2018, Sandberg stated that "On this one, it was just like 'Yeah, I want this to be a classic superhero movie.' It takes place in the winter, so it's a lot of dark exteriors, but with a lot of colorful lights and stuff around them." On July 21, 2018, the first teaser trailer was shown at San Diego Comic-Con during the Warner Bros. panel at Hall H, with Sandberg, Zachary Levi, Asher Angel, and Jack Dylan Grazer in attendance. The trailer was later released online. It received a favorable response from journalists and audiences, who praised its humorous, zany tone.

New footage from the film made its debut at Brazil Comic Con (CCXP) in São Paulo on December 9, 2018, during the Warner Bros. studio panel, with the footage described for the attendees as action-packed. A new trailer was released on March 4, and a three-minute sneak peek was included with the digital home media of Aquaman. At the STP 500 on March 24, 2019, Shazam! was the primary sponsor of Aric Almirola and the #10 Ford Mustang in the Monster Energy NASCAR Cup Series. Altogether the studio spent about $105 million promoting the film.

== Release ==
=== Theatrical ===
On March 13, 2019, Warner Bros. Pictures announced that they were teaming up with Fandango for exclusive preview screenings on March 23, two weeks before release, on 1,200 select screens and 40 exhibition circuits. Shazam! premiered at TCL Chinese Theatre in Hollywood on March 28, 2019, and was theatrically released in the United States by Warner Bros. Pictures on April 5, 2019.

=== Home media ===
Shazam! was released on digital download on July 2, 2019, and was released on Ultra HD Blu-ray, Blu-ray, and DVD on July 16. Physical copies contain behind-the-scenes featurettes, deleted scenes, and gag reels. As of August 20, 2020, Shazam! has made $8.3 million in DVD sales and $21 million in Blu-ray sales, totaling an estimated $29.4 million in domestic video sales.

== Reception ==
=== Box office ===
Shazam! grossed $140.5 million in the United States and Canada, and $227.3 million in other territories, for a worldwide total of $367.8 million. It was estimated that the film needed to gross $235–250 million worldwide in order to break even, and Deadline Hollywood calculated the film made a net profit of $74 million, when factoring together all expenses and revenues.

In the United States and Canada, Shazam! was released alongside The Best of Enemies and Pet Sematary, and was projected to gross $40–50 million from 4,260 theaters in its opening weekend. Two weeks before its release, the film grossed $3.3 million from Fandango advance screenings, higher than the $2.9 million made by fellow DCEU film Aquaman the previous December. It then made $5.9 million from Thursday night screenings on April 4, for a combined preview total of $9.2 million. The film grossed a total of $20.4 million on its first day, including Thursday previews, but not the March screenings. It went on to debut to $53.5 million, finishing first at the box office. In its second weekend the film made $24.5 million, retaining the top spot, before being dethroned by newcomer The Curse of La Llorona in its third weekend. In its fourth weekend, it made $5.6 million and finished fifth at the box office, including behind fellow superhero films Avengers: Endgame and Captain Marvel.

In other territories, the film was released in 53 markets on Wednesday, April 3 and Thursday, April 4, and was projected to debut to $100–120 million, for a global opening of $145–170. In its first two days of international release the film made $15.7 million, finishing first in 48 of its 53 markets. It was then released in an additional 26 countries, including China, where it made $16.4 million on its first day. It went on to have an international debut of $102 million, and a global total of $158.6 million. It came in first in 60 of its 79 markets, with its highest-grossing being China ($43.4 million), Mexico ($10.6 million), Australia ($10.3 million), the United Kingdom ($15.3 million), Russia ($8.4 million), and Brazil ($8.7 million).

=== Critical response ===
On review aggregator website Rotten Tomatoes, the film holds an approval rating of 90% with an average rating of 7.3/10, based on 421 reviews. The website's critical consensus reads, "An effortlessly entertaining blend of humor and heart, Shazam! is a superhero movie that never forgets the genre's real power: joyous wish fulfillment." On Metacritic, the film has a weighted average score of 71 out of 100, based on 53 critics, indicating "generally favorable" reviews. Audiences surveyed by CinemaScore gave the film an average grade of "A" on an A+ to F scale, while those polled by PostTrak gave it a 79% positive score, with 59% saying they would definitely recommend it.

Nick Allen of RogerEbert.com said that "while Shazam! is goofier (and darker) than it may look, you'll wish its superhero came with a little more spark," while The Hollywood Reporter's Frank Scheck called the film "Big on steroids" and praised the tone and performances. Alonso Duralde of TheWrap wrote, "If the Wonder Woman and Aquaman movies represented DC Comics' first big-screen steps away from the austere color palette of the Zack Snyder movies, Shazam! takes us deeply into primary colors in a single bound... this new DC entry has a lovely lightness, both in the visuals and in its tone."

Writing for The A.V. Club, Ignatiy Vishnevetsky gave the film a "B−" and said: "...while the story of an extremely overpowered champion rising to challenge a one-dimensionally sinister baddie might seem like the epitome of simplicity, Shazam! is still a modern-day tentpole blockbuster, overburdened with backstories for both hero and villain and subtexts that it can't (or won't) fully articulate." That publication followed up with a further consideration of masculinity in the film and the superhero genre generally, focusing on the transition of Billy Batson from an adolescent boy to a man with power and responsibility. Benjamin Lee of The Guardian gave the film 3 out of 5 stars, specifying, "The finale, while admirably self-contained and small-scale, grinds on for far too long, a boring escalation of anti-climaxes that cumulatively dull the intended emotional impact. It's a film in need of a tighter edit with a script in need of a sharper polish, an imperfect franchise-launcher that nonetheless represents significant progress for DC."

=== Accolades ===
Award	Date of ceremony	Category	Recipients	Result	Ref.
Golden Trailer Awards	May 29, 2019	Best Action	"My Name" (Buddha Jones)	Nominated	
Golden Trailer Awards	May 29, 2019	Best Action TV Spot	"Serious :60" (Buddha Jones)	Nominated	
Golden Trailer Awards	July 22, 2021	Best Title/Credit Sequence for a Feature Length Film	Shazam! (Aspect)	Won	
MTV Movie & TV Awards	June 17, 2019	Best Comedic Performance	Zachary Levi	Nominated	
MTV Movie & TV Awards	June 17, 2019	Best Hero	Zachary Levi	Nominated	
Saturn Awards	September 13, 2019	Best Comic-to-Film Motion Picture	Shazam!	Nominated	
Saturn Awards	September 13, 2019	Best Performance by a Younger Actor	Asher Angel	Nominated	
Saturn Awards	September 13, 2019	Best Performance by a Younger Actor	Jack Dylan Grazer	Nominated	
Saturn Awards	September 13, 2019	Best Costume Design	Leah Butler	Nominated	
Teen Choice Awards	August 11, 2019	Choice Sci-Fi/Fantasy Movie	Shazam!	Nominated	
Teen Choice Awards	August 11, 2019	Choice Sci-Fi/Fantasy Movie Actor	Zachary Levi	Nominated	
Teen Choice Awards	August 11, 2019	Choice Movie Villain	Mark Strong	Nominated	
People's Choice Awards	November 10, 2019	Favorite Action Movie of 2019	Shazam!	Nominated	
National Film and Television Awards	December 3, 2019	Best Comedy	David F. Sandberg	Won	

== Future ==
=== Sequel ===
On April 8, 2019, TheWrap reported that New Line Cinema was developing a sequel with Henry Gayden returning to write the film, along with David F. Sandberg directing and Peter Safran producing. In December 2019, New Line Cinema announced that the sequel would be released on April 1, 2022. Following several delays, the film was released on March 17, 2023.

=== Spin-off ===
Dwayne Johnson was attached to Shazam! early in development, and confirmed that he would portray the villain Black Adam in September 2014. The producers decided to give the character his own film in January 2017, and Adam Sztykiel was hired that October. Jaume Collet-Serra joined in June 2019. Additional casting took place over the next year, including four members of the Justice Society of America (JSA), and the script was re-written by Haines and Noshirvani. Filming took place from April to August 2021 in Atlanta, Georgia, and also Los Angeles. It was originally set for release on December 22, 2021, but was pushed back and released on October 21, 2022.
