= Pain Hustlers =

2023 film by David Yates

- Release poster
- Directed by: David Yates
- Screenplay by: Wells Tower
- Based on: Pain Hustlers by Evan Hughes
- Produced by: Lawrence Grey; David Yates
- Starring: Emily Blunt; Chris Evans; Andy García; Catherine O'Hara; Jay Duplass; Brian d'Arcy James; Chloe Coleman
- Cinematography: George Richmond
- Edited by: Mark Day
- Music by: James Newton Howard; Michael Dean Parsons
- Production companies: Grey Matter Productions; Wychwood Pictures
- Distributed by: Netflix
- Release dates: September 11, 2023 (TIFF); October 20, 2023 (United States); October 27, 2023 (Netflix)
- Running time: 123 minutes
- Country: United States
- Language: English
- Budget: $50 million

Pain Hustlers is a 2023 American crime comedy film co-produced and directed by David Yates from a screenplay by Wells Tower, based on the 2022 book of the same name by Evan Hughes. The film is loosely based on the activities of the real world company Insys Therapeutics and their role in the US opioid crisis. The film stars Emily Blunt, Chris Evans, Andy García, Catherine O'Hara, Jay Duplass, Brian d'Arcy James, and Chloe Coleman. Its plot centers on a high school dropout who lands a job with a failing pharmaceutical company in Central Florida, where she soon finds herself at the center of a criminal conspiracy.

Pain Hustlers had its premiere at the Toronto International Film Festival on September 11, 2023, and was released in select theaters in the United States on October 20, before its streaming debut by Netflix on October 27. The film received generally negative reviews from critics.

== Plot ==
In 2011, Liza Drake is a struggling single mother living out of her sister's garage in Florida with her epileptic daughter Phoebe. Working as an exotic dancer, she is offered a lucrative job by customer Pete Brenner.

An argument over money leads to Liza and Phoebe getting kicked out, so they move into a motel. When her car is repossessed, Liza finds Pete at pharmaceutical company Zanna to accept the job. She doesn't know the start-up is struggling, with difficulty breaking into the market and desperately scrambling for investors to fund a marketing push ahead of the planned IPO.

Pete rewrites Liza's dismal resume, giving her a degree in biochemistry. She impresses the company founder, Doctor Jack Neel, who overrides their hiring freeze. Pete gives her five days to convince a physician to prescribe their drug, Lonafen.

Liza goes through the entire list of prospects in under five days without any success. Meanwhile, Phoebe experiences a seizure and they learn she has CAVM. Thinking the job is over, Liza returns to Dr. Lydell's office, her first sales attempt, to collect some Tupperware and overhears a cancer patient discussing a commonly prescribed drug's side effects.

Liza argues that Lonafen would be a better option, so Lydell prescribes it. She invites him to launch their speaker program by sharing his experience with the drug's efficacy. The event fails and he nearly withdraws despite his patient praising the drug, but Liza gets the program on track. When Pete offers financial incentives, Lydell prescribes Lonafen to all eligible patients. Based on this success, they hire a team of sales reps and Zanna wins 86% of the regional market.

Larkin, an envious company executive, tries to expose Liza as a fraud for her doctored resume but Neel promotes her to National Sales Director and Pete to COO, who then fires Larkin. The profitable company moves into larger offices where Neel's eccentricities manifest more clearly. When CEO Eric Paley is found to be secretly recording an executive meeting, he is fired but cashes in big on his shares. As growth flattens, Neel pressures the team to market Lonafen for all types of pain, not just cancer. Liza disagrees with this, but Neel dismisses her. He also instructs Liza to fire her mother Jackie as a rep, after he slept with her.

Liza approaches Lydell with her new marching orders and is disappointed when he readily agrees to go along. Meanwhile, Phoebe experiences another seizure and requires expensive brain surgery. Although Liza offers her stock options in Zanna as collateral for a loan, she is denied because of the pharma sector's volatility. After Lydell is arrested in a DEA sting, a desperate Liza asks Neel for help paying for the surgery but he exhorts her to use Phoebe's situation as "fire" for inspiration, like he did when his wife was dying from cancer and he came up with Lonafen.

When a friend's husband dies from a Lonafen overdose and her condolences are rejected, Liza agrees to testify to the U.S. Attorney's office that's investigating Zanna. She admits her involvement in Zanna's speaker and bribery programs. Liza confirms who signed off on those programs: Eric Paley, Pete Brenner, and Jack Neel. Asked to come up with hard proof linking Neel to the criminal activity, she explains that he has completely insulated himself from daily operations.

After Liza unsuccessfully attempts to procure a printout from Pete's jacket, he is arrested, though Neel offers to take care of his family while he's in prison. Neel himself remains seemingly untouchable until Liza links him to Zanna's illegal activities via an old email exchange during his affair with her mother.

The investigation reveals that Lonafen is essentially fentanyl, which is why non-terminal patients became addicts and often overdosed. Lydell, Paley, Brenner, and Neel all receive prison sentences. After a heartfelt apology in court and the prosecution's recommendation that Liza not serve time in order not to discourage future whistleblowers, she is still sentenced to 15 months, as her greed cost lives.

After Liza's release, she partners with some of the previous Zanna reps to form the skin care company she and Jackie had envisioned years ago.

== Cast ==
- Emily Blunt as Liza Drake
- Chris Evans as Pete Brenner
- Catherine O'Hara as Jackie, Liza's mother
- Andy García as Dr. Neel
- Jay Duplass as Larkin
- Brian d'Arcy James as Dr. Lydell
- Amit Shah as Eric Paley
- Chloe Coleman as Phoebe, Liza's daughter
- Aubrey Dollar as Andy
- Michael Kosta as Guy Schatz
- Nick McNeil as Randy

== Production ==
In August 2021, Sony Pictures announced the development of an untitled film directed by David Yates and written by Wells Tower, based on the Evan Hughes' New York Times Magazine article "The Pain Hustlers" from May 2, 2018, and his subsequent book The Hard Sell released in January 2022. It is a co-production between Grey Matter Productions and Wychwood Pictures. Yates produced the film along with Lawrence Grey and Yvonne Walcott Yates. In May 2022, Emily Blunt joined the cast and Netflix acquired the film, which was titled Pain Hustlers, in a deal worth at least $50 million. In July, Chris Evans came on board to star. In August, Andy Garcia, Catherine O'Hara, Jay Duplass, Brian d'Arcy James, and Chloe Coleman were added to the cast. Production began in late August.

== Release ==
Pain Hustlers had its world premiere at the Toronto International Film Festival on September 11, 2023. It was released in select theaters in the United States on October 20, 2023, and on Netflix on October 27.

== Reception ==
On the review aggregator website Rotten Tomatoes, 23% of 115 critics' reviews are positive, with an average rating of 4.8/10. The website's consensus reads: "Pain Hustlers has some great actors and a worthwhile premise, but lackluster execution dooms this dramatic look at the opioid epidemic." Metacritic, which uses a weighted average, assigned the film a score of 44 out of 100, based on 34 critics, indicating "mixed or average" reviews.

== See also ==
- Insys Therapeutics
