= David F. Sandberg =

Swedish filmmaker (born 1981)

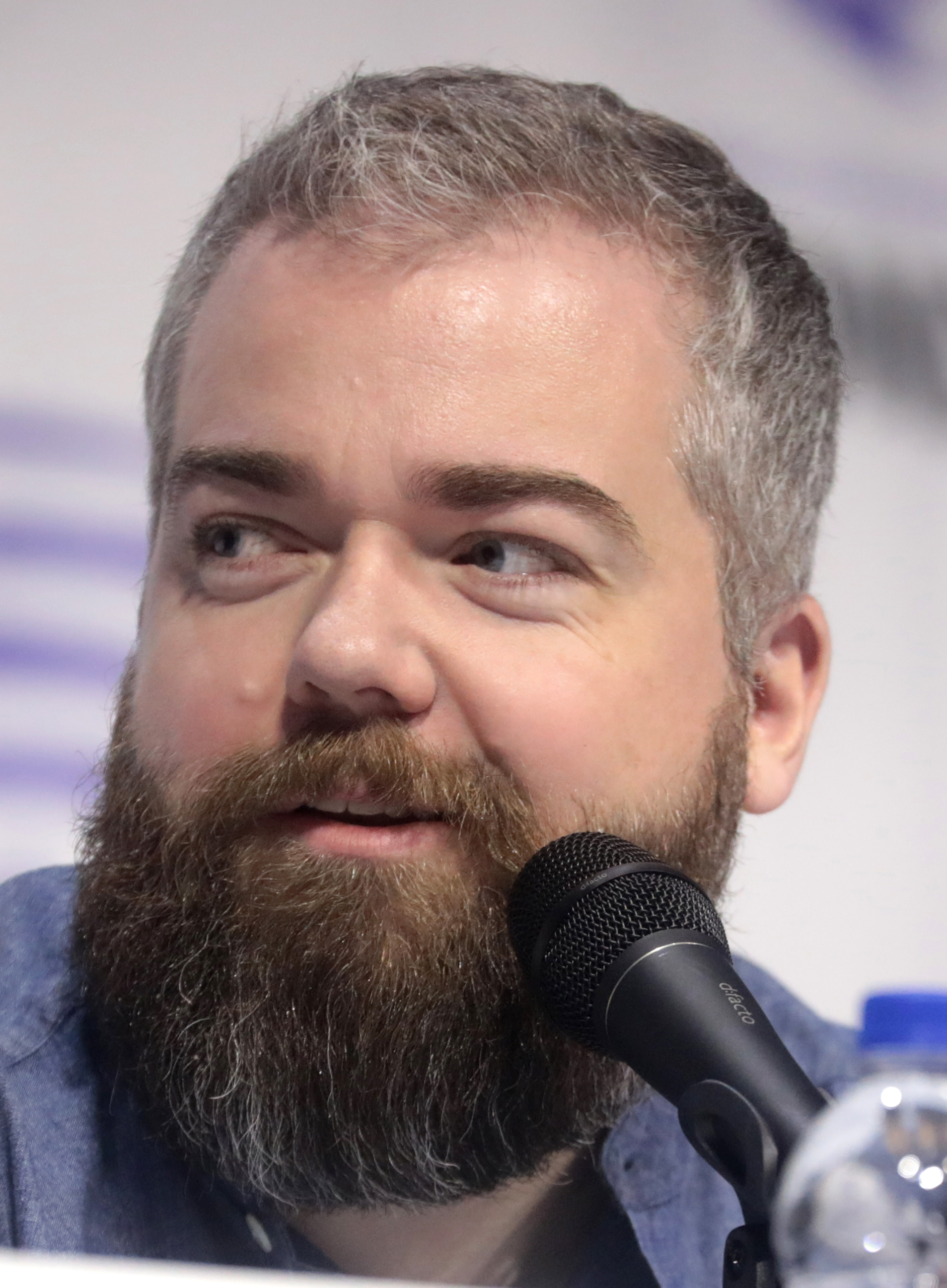
- Sandberg in March 2019
- Born: David Fredrik Sandberg; 21 January 1981 (age 45); Jönköping, Sweden
- Other name: ponysmasher
- Occupations: Filmmaker, YouTuber
- Years active: 2006–present
- Spouse: Lotta Losten (m. 2013)

David Fredrik Sandberg (born 21 January 1981) is a Swedish filmmaker and YouTuber. He came to prominence for writing, directing, producing, editing, and scoring no-budget short horror films, which he released online under the pseudonym "ponysmasher". The most popular of these, Lights Out (2013), received a feature film adaptation in 2016, marking his feature-length directorial debut. He has since directed the films Annabelle: Creation (2017), Shazam! (2019), Shazam! Fury of the Gods (2023), and the 2025 film adaptation of the video game Until Dawn.

== Early life ==
David Fredrik Sandberg was born in Jönköping on 21 January 1981. His younger brother, Joakim, is a video game developer best known as the creator of Iconoclasts. He attended Torpa School, where he met his future wife Lotta Losten when they were both around 11 years old, and they later attended Junedal School together. He grew up watching films and making his own films using his father's VHS-C camera. He worked in a video store as a teenager, where he saved up money to buy his own camcorder for filmmaking.

== Career ==
=== Beginning with animation and documentaries (2006–2013) ===
In his late teens, Sandberg began working as an intern at Film i Jönköping, a local film center in Jönköping. He learned more about filmmaking from Svante Rosberg, the film commissioner who ran Film i Jönköping when he started, and whom Sandberg considers his mentor. Starting in 2006, Sandberg found moderate online success making animated short films; according to Sandberg, his first online successes were his films För Barnen and Vad Tyst Det Blev, the latter of which garnered 1.7 million views on YouTube. As a result of his increased visibility, he began to receive offers for animation work; his first job was working as a consultant on the TV show Myggan on the Swedish Kanal 5.

He continued working at Film i Jönköping, primarily working on documentary projects. From 2006 to 2009, he worked on several documentaries for the Swedish Inheritance Fund. His last collaboration with Rosberg before his retirement was Animera = Göra Livlig, a 2010 documentary about senior citizens creating animated films. In 2009, he moved to the city of Gothenburg. He continued working on animation and documentaries, and began collaborating with producer Claes Lundin. In 2011, they completed and sold an animated documentary series called Earth Savers, and in 2013, their documentary short Ladyboy premiered at Cinequest Film & Creativity Festival.

=== Shifting to feature films (2013–present) ===
In 2013, he began to shift his focus away from animation and documentary works and towards short horror films. According to Sandberg, his original goal with filmmaking had been to make horror and sci-fi films, and he felt he needed to have some existing work in that field in order to get funding for future work. Lacking any funding of his own, his shorts were made with no budget: his equipment and props consisted mostly of items he already had or could buy very cheaply, and his only cast and crew were himself and Losten, his wife. He released his films on both Vimeo and YouTube, using his alias "ponysmasher". He then released his second horror short, Lights Out (2013), which centered around a monster that only exists when the lights are turned out. The film was a viral success, and quickly garnered millions of views. According to Sandberg, his life changed "in every way imaginable" after Lights Out; he began receiving tons of messages from film industry people who wanted to work with him. One of these contacts was Lawrence Grey, a producer who wanted to adapt Lights Out into a feature-length film. Grey brought screenwriter Eric Heisserer and producer James Wan on board to collaborate and produce a script with Sandberg, who would also direct the new feature. The film (also titled Lights Out) began production in mid-2015, and premiered at LA Film Festival in June 2016. The film was a massive box office success, grossing $148 million on a $5 million budget, and a moderate critical success, earning a 76% approval score on Rotten Tomatoes and a 58 out of 100 score on Metacritic. Sandberg next directed Annabelle: Creation, a prequel to supernatural horror film Annabelle and the fourth film in The Conjuring Universe. The film was released in 2017 to positive reviews and box office success.

In 2019, Sandberg directed the DC Extended Universe superhero film Shazam!, based on the DC Comics character of the same name. The film received positive reviews. In April 2019, TheWrap reported that Sandberg would direct a sequel for New Line Cinema called Shazam! Fury of the Gods. In 2023, after the release of Shazam! Fury of the Gods, Sandberg stated he was "done" with the superhero genre and expressed a desire to return to horror. He then directed and produced the 2025 film adaptation of the video game Until Dawn.

Sandberg is set to direct and produce the horror film The Culling with his wife Losten through their production company Mångata. The film will be distributed by Lionsgate. He is set to direct the film adaptation of Cullen Bunn and Jack T. Cole's graphic novel The Unsound and thriller Below, both for Netflix.

== Personal life ==
Sandberg met actress Lotta Losten in the early 1990s, when they were both around 11 years old, and they later began a relationship before marrying in 2013. She has featured in many of his short films, including Lights Out. They have lived in Los Angeles since 2015.

Sandberg was diagnosed with atypical autism as a child, but has since expressed an interest in the possibility that he was misdiagnosed. He has also been open about his struggles with depression.

== Filmography ==
=== Film ===
Director

- Lights Out (2016)
- Annabelle: Creation (2017)
- Shazam! (2019)
- Shazam! Fury of the Gods (2023)
- Until Dawn (2025) (Also producer)

Uncredited acting roles

Year	Title	Role	Notes
2019	Shazam!	Travis, Mister Mind, Crocodile-Men	Voice role (as Travis and Mister Mind) and performer (as the Crocodile-Men)
2023	Shazam! Fury of the Gods	Mister Mind	Voice role

=== Shorts ===
Year	Title	Director	Writer	Producer	Cinematographer	Editor	Composer	Actor	Notes
2006	Vad tyst det blev...	Yes	Yes	Yes	No	Yes	Yes	Yes	Role: Boy (voice only); Also sound department
2011	Animera = Göra livlig	Yes	No	No	No	Yes	Yes	No	Documentary short
2012	The Drawing Box	Yes	Yes	Yes	No	No	No	Yes	Role: David/David's Brother
2013	Ladyboy	Yes	No	No	Yes	No	Yes	No	Documentary short
2013	Cam Closer	Yes	Yes	No	Yes	Yes	No	No	
2013	Lights Out	Yes	Yes	Yes	Yes	Yes	Yes	No	
2014	Pictured	Yes	Yes	No	Yes	No	Yes	No	
2014	Not So Fast	Yes	Yes	No	Yes	Yes	No	Yes	Role: Man
2014	Coffer	Yes	Yes	No	Yes	Yes	No	No	
2014	See You Soon	Yes	Yes	No	Yes	No	Yes	No	
2015	Attic Panic	Yes	Yes	Yes	Yes	Yes	Yes	Yes	Role: Ghost
2016	Closet Space	Yes	Yes	Yes	Yes	No	No	Yes	Role: David
2020	Shadowed	Yes	Yes	Yes	Yes	Yes	Yes	Yes	Role: Man; Also visual effects
2020	Not Alone in Here	Yes	Yes	Yes	Yes	Yes	Yes	Yes	Role: Man
2023	Cam Closer II	Yes	Yes	Yes	Yes	Yes	No	No	
2025	Call of the Ocean	Yes	Yes	Yes	Yes	Yes	No	No	

=== Television ===
Year	Title	Director	Composer	Animator	Notes
2011	Earth Savers	6 episodes	5 episodes	2 episodes	Documentary series
