= Lights Out (2013 film) =

- Film poster
- Directed by: David F. Sandberg
- Written by: David F. Sandberg
- Produced by: David F. Sandberg
- Starring: Lotta Losten
- Cinematography: David F. Sandberg
- Edited by: David F. Sandberg
- Music by: David F. Sandberg
- Production company: Sandberg Company
- Release date: 30 December 2013
- Running time: 3 minutes
- Country: Sweden
- Language: None (no dialogue)

Lights Out is a 2013 Swedish supernatural horror short film directed, written, produced, shot, and scored by David F. Sandberg and starring Sandberg's wife Lotta Losten. The film was released online on 30 December 2013 on both Vimeo and YouTube. The short film was the basis of an eponymous 2016 film adaptation, also directed by Sandberg.

== Plot ==
On a dark and rainy night, a woman (Lotta Losten) comes out of a room and turns off the hallway light, which causes a long-haired, humanlike silhouette to become visible at the other end of the hallway. Surprised, the woman turns the light back on and the silhouette vanishes. Switching the light off and on, she watches the silhouette appear and disappear, stopping when the silhouette suddenly moves so close it is inches away from her face. Gasping, she turns the light back on and tapes the switch in that position to prevent the silhouette from returning.

The woman goes to bed, leaving the lamp on her bedside table on and the door leading to the lit hallway ajar. She hears creaking sounds and looks towards the doorway. The hallway light starts flickering and eventually turns off. Scared, she hears footsteps approaching the bedroom and hides under the blanket. After a few seconds of silence, she peeks out. The door opens wider by itself, which terrifies the woman.

The lamp flickers. From under the blanket, the woman looks towards the power strip it is plugged in to. She nervously reaches out, locates the plug, and pushes it in more firmly. The flickering stops. The hallway light clicks back on and she sees it is on again and the door is only slightly ajar again. She is relieved, but unfortunately suddenly sees a monstrous humanoid with all-white eyes and an open mouth at her bedside table. The monster turns off the lamp, and the screen goes dark.

== Production ==
The film had practically no budget as it involved only Sandberg and Losten. The film involved two lights and two rooms. In particular, he used a Blackmagic cinema camera with a Tokina 11-16 lens, a Zoom H4N with a Røde NTG1 microphone, a paper lantern from IKEA, a 375-watt photo bulb, a Chinese knockoff redhead light from eBay, a Manfrotto tripod, a homemade dolly with PVC pipe, a piece of shelving also from IKEA, and skate wheels.

The visual effects of having the ghost appear and disappear were mostly done by using a split-screen technique. In an interview with The A.V. Club about the 2016 feature-length adaptation, which used the same technique, Sandberg said, "Whenever she's in frame with another character, it's basically just a split screen. So you shoot it with her and without her. You turn the camera on with her, you turn it off and she walks off, and then you turn it on again. It's super simple, actually."

== Release and reception ==
The short film was first released for a film festival called the Bloody Cuts Horror Challenge, where it was a finalist and where Sandberg won Best Director. Some months later, the short film became popular online on Vimeo and YouTube, going from about 8,000 views to over 1 million and attracting Hollywood directors and producers. As of March 2026, the video has 18 million views on YouTube. The short received critical acclaim and won for Best Short at FANT Bilbao 2014, as well as Best Director in Who's There Film Challenge.
