= Shazam! Fury of the Gods =

2023 DC Comics superhero film

- Theatrical release poster
- Directed by: David F. Sandberg
- Written by: Henry Gayden; Chris Morgan
- Based on: Characters by DC
- Produced by: Peter Safran
- Starring: Zachary Levi; Asher Angel; Jack Dylan Grazer; Rachel Zegler; Adam Brody; Ross Butler; D. J. Cotrona; Grace Caroline Currey; Meagan Good; Lucy Liu; Djimon Hounsou; Helen Mirren
- Cinematography: Gyula Pados
- Edited by: Michel Aller
- Music by: Christophe Beck
- Production companies: New Line Cinema; DC Films; The Safran Company
- Distributed by: Warner Bros. Pictures
- Release dates: March 14, 2023 (Fox Village Theatre); March 17, 2023 (United States)
- Running time: 130 minutes
- Country: United States
- Language: English
- Budget: $110–125 million
- Box office: $134 million

Shazam! Fury of the Gods is a 2023 American superhero film based on the DC character Shazam. Produced by New Line Cinema, DC Films, and the Safran Company, and distributed by Warner Bros. Pictures, it is the sequel to Shazam! (2019) and the 12th installment in the DC Extended Universe (DCEU). Directed by David F. Sandberg and written by Henry Gayden and Chris Morgan, it stars Zachary Levi, Asher Angel, Jack Dylan Grazer, Rachel Zegler, Adam Brody, Ross Butler, D. J. Cotrona, Grace Caroline Currey, Meagan Good, Lucy Liu, Djimon Hounsou, and Helen Mirren. The plot follows Billy Batson / Shazam and his foster siblings as they fight the Daughters of Atlas to save the Earth.

A sequel to Shazam! began development shortly after its release in April 2019, with Gayden returning as writer, and Morgan joining soon after to revise Gayden's screenplay. Sandberg and Levi were also set to return by that December. The title and the rest of the returning cast were confirmed in August 2020, with Zegler, Mirren and Liu cast as the daughters of Atlas in early 2021. Filming began that May in Atlanta, Georgia, and concluded in August.

Shazam! Fury of the Gods premiered at the Fox Village Theatre in Los Angeles on March 14, 2023, and was released in the United States on March 17, by Warner Bros. Pictures. Unlike its predecessor, the film received mixed reviews from critics, and was a box-office bomb, grossing $134 million worldwide against a production budget of $110–125 million.

== Plot ==
Four years after Thaddeus Sivana's defeat, (Note: As depicted in Shazam! (2019)) Hespera and Kalypso, daughters of the Titan Atlas, break into the Acropolis Museum in Athens to steal the Wizard's broken staff. Taking it to the Wizard, imprisoned in the Gods' Realm, they force him to repair it and reactivate its powers.

In Philadelphia, Billy Batson and his "Shazamily" are drifting apart as they grow up and pursue their interests. One day, they rescue a group of people when the Benjamin Franklin Bridge suffers damage, but they are criticized for not being able to prevent it from collapsing, in addition to other recent collateral damage, being nicknamed "The Philly Fiascos" by the public. Billy is worried about being kicked out of the Vasquez family home when he turns eighteen. In a dream, the Wizard warns him about the Daughters of Atlas, prompting the Shazamily to research them.

The Shazamily enter the Rock of Eternity, where they encounter the sentient pen Steve. It writes about the three daughters of Atlas, and they realize that Anthea, Atlas's youngest daughter, is none other than a girl named Anne. She is someone Freddy Freeman is going to meet.

When Freddy meets Anne, he shows off his superhero self. Hespera and Kalypso arrive with the staff and steal his powers. Billy and the Shazamily try to save Freddy, but the daughters kidnap him, encasing the city within an indestructible dome and trapping everyone inside. He is subsequently imprisoned within the Wizard in the Gods' Realm.

The Shazamily asks Steve to help draft a letter to negotiate with Hespera for Freddy's release. Billy meets her at a local restaurant and, although the meeting is initially cordial, she and Kalypso soon fight the Shazamily. Pedro loses his powers during the battle, while Hespera is captured and taken to the Rock. Having planned her capture, Hespera easily breaks out and steals the Golden Apple, the seed of the Tree of Life.

Meanwhile, Freddy and the Wizard attempt to escape the Gods' Realm with the sympathetic Anthea's help, just as Hespera returns with the Apple. The Daughters argue as Hespera and Anthea want to use the Apple to revive their realm, while Kalypso wishes to plant it on Earth to destroy it. Freddy steals it but is soon discovered. Billy and the Shazamily show up, and Freddy reacquires his powers.

Billy and the Shazamily emerge with the Wizard at the Vasquez home, where they reveal their secret identities to their foster parents. Kalypso appears with the dragon Ladon to acquire the Apple and destroy the Vasquez house.

The Shazamily attempts to keep the Apple away from Kalypso, but everyone except Billy loses their powers in the skirmish. Kalypso retrieves it, using it to plant the Tree at Citizens Bank Park. It then spawns various monsters to attack the city.

Hespera and Anthea object to their sister's destructive plan, but Kalypso mortally wounds Hespera and de-powers Anthea. Billy, in despair, asks the Wizard to revoke his powers, but the Wizard assures him that he is a true hero and so worthy of them.

Heeding the Wizard's words, Billy flies off to stop Kalypso, while the Shazamily enlists the help of dark unicorns to fend off the other monsters. Billy persuades a dying Hespera to help him stop Kalypso. Realizing the dome reacts violently to his lightning, Billy lures Kalypso to the park while Hespera shrinks the dome to contain them. Billy sacrifices himself to kill Kalypso and Ladon by overloading the staff with electricity and screaming his name, destroying the Tree and Kalypso's army with it. Hespera acknowledges him as a true god before succumbing to her wounds, causing the dome to disappear.

Anthea takes Billy's grieving family to the Gods' Realm for his burial. Diana Prince, known as Wonder Woman, appears and repairs the staff. Imbuing it with her power, she uses it to revive the Gods' Realm, restore Anthea's powers, and resurrect Billy. Billy, in turn, uses the staff to restore his siblings' powers. The Shazamily rebuild their home, while Anthea and Freddy start a relationship, and the Wizard takes up residence on Earth.

In a mid-credits scene, Emilia Harcourt and John Economos invite Billy into the Justice Society on behalf of Amanda Waller, but both turn and walk away as Billy expected an offer from the Justice League, wishing to be with his crush Wonder Woman, and is annoyed at how similar they sound. In a post-credits scene, a still-incarcerated Sivana encounters Mister Mind once again, enraged that he has not begun enacting their plan.

== Cast ==
- Zachary Levi and Asher Angel as Billy Batson / Shazam:
  The champion of an ancient wizard, who possesses "the wisdom of Solomon, the strength of Hercules, the stamina of Atlas, the power of Zeus, the courage of Achilles, and the speed of Mercury".
- Jack Dylan Grazer and Adam Brody as Freddy Freeman:
  Billy's physically disabled foster brother, who is a fan of superheroes. Grazer portrays Freddy's regular form, while Brody portrays his adult superhero form.
- Rachel Zegler as Anthea / Anne: The youngest daughter of Atlas, who has the power of Axis, and Freddy's love interest.
- Ross Butler and Ian Chen as Eugene Choi:
  Billy's younger foster brother who is an obsessive gamer. Butler portrays Eugene's adult superhero form, while Chen portrays his regular form.
- D. J. Cotrona and Jovan Armand as Pedro Peña:
  Billy's older foster brother, who is shy, sensitive and later revealed to be gay. Cotrona portrays Pedro's adult superhero form, while Armand portrays his regular form.
- Grace Caroline Currey as Mary Bromfield:
  Billy's mature and academically driven older foster sister. Currey also portrays Mary's adult superhero form, replacing Michelle Borth from the first film.
- Meagan Good and Faithe Herman as Darla Dudley:
  Billy's good-natured younger foster sister. Good portrays Darla's adult superhero form, while Herman portrays her regular form.
- Lucy Liu as Kalypso: The middle daughter of Atlas, who has the power of chaos.
- Djimon Hounsou as Shazam: The last surviving member of the Council of Wizards, who bestowed his powers on Billy Batson, after designating the boy as his champion.
- Helen Mirren as Hespera: The oldest daughter of Atlas, who has elemental abilities.

Billy's foster family also includes Marta Milans and Cooper Andrews as Rosa and Victor Vásquez, the foster parents of Billy and his siblings. Reprising their DCEU roles in the film while uncredited, Gal Gadot appears as Diana Prince / Wonder Woman, alongside Jennifer Holland as Emilia Harcourt and Steve Agee as John Economos in the mid-credits scene, and Mark Strong as Dr. Thaddeus Sivana and director David F. Sandberg as the voice of Mister Mind in the post-credits scene. Sandberg also cameos as a civilian who is attacked by one of Kalypso's monsters. Rizwan Manji, who portrayed Jamil in the DCEU television series Peacemaker, appears as an unnamed docent. P. J. Byrne briefly appears as Dr. Dario Bava, a pediatrician whom Billy confused as a therapist, while Diedrich Bader briefly appears as Mr. Geckle, a school teacher. Sandberg's wife Lotta Losten, who previously portrayed Dr. Lynn Crosby in the first film, cameos as a nurse who is saved by Shazam. Michael Gray, who portrayed Billy Batson in the 1970s television series, makes a brief cameo as a man on the street, calling the transformed Billy "Captain Marvel". Natalia Safran, wife of producer Peter Safran, cameos as a driver with kittens. CNN news anchor Wolf Blitzer makes a cameo appearance as himself.

== Production ==
=== Development ===
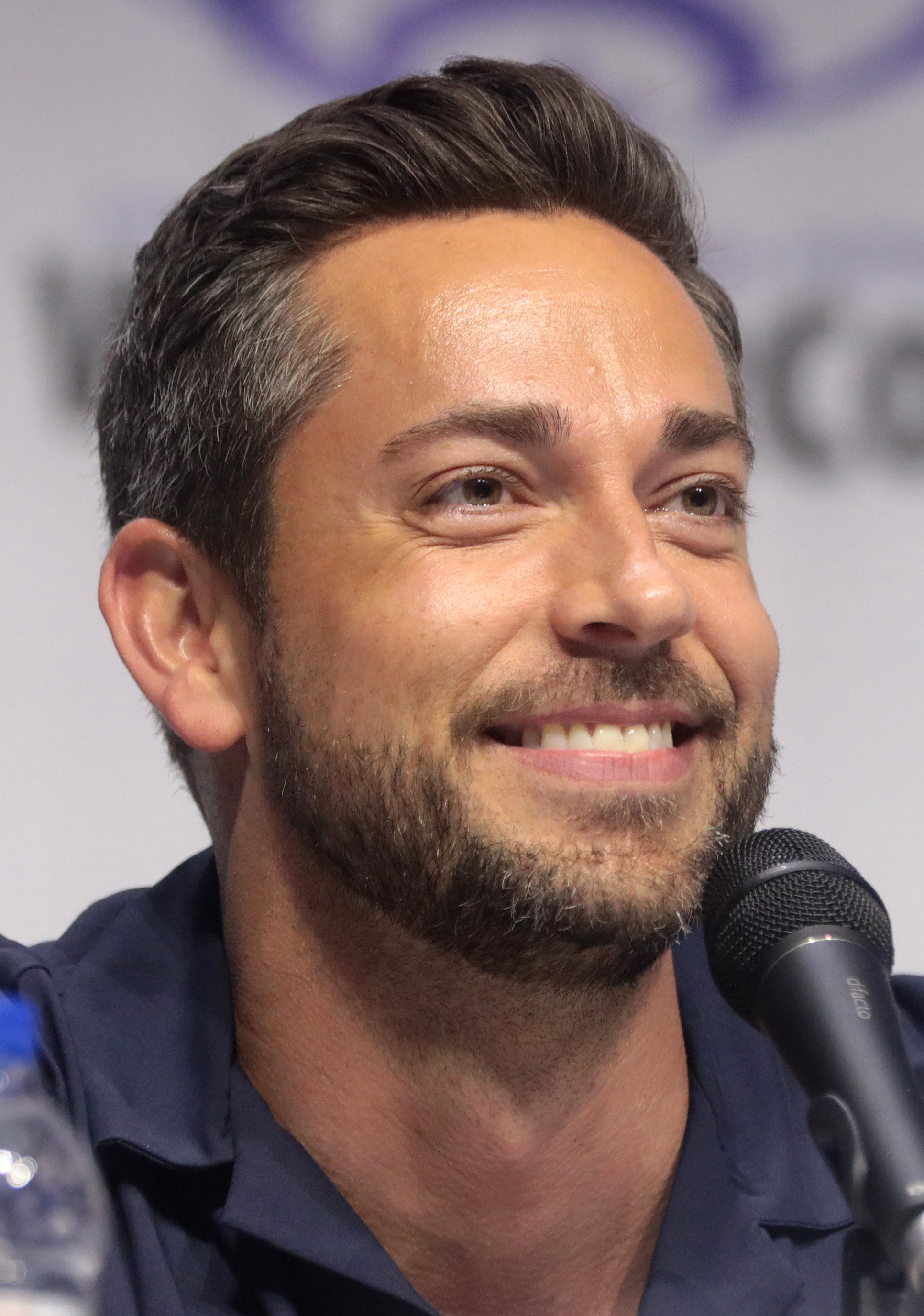
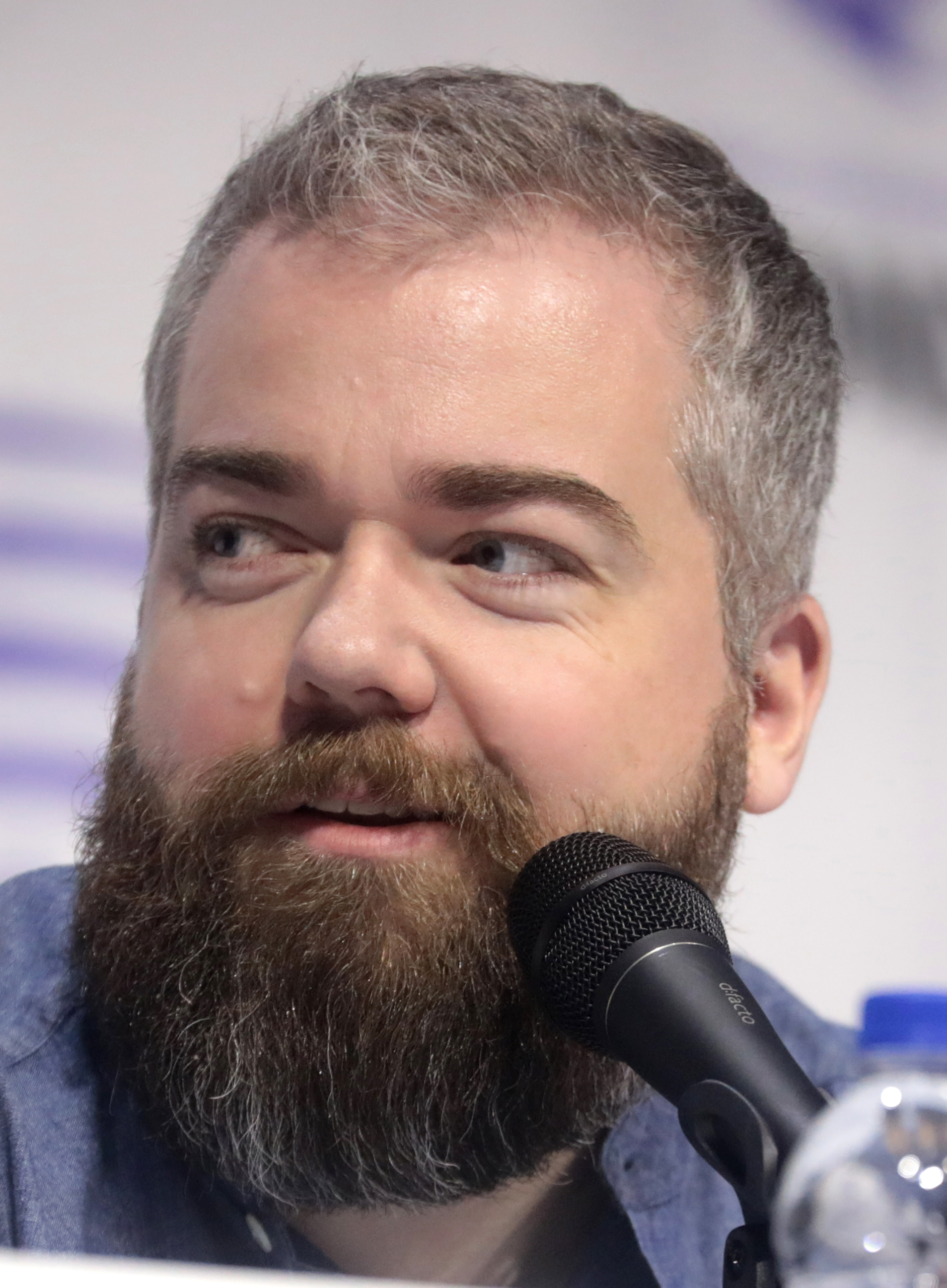
Actor Zachary Levi and director David F. Sandberg returned for the Shazam! sequel

With the successful opening of Shazam! in April 2019, Henry Gayden was revealed to be returning to write the script for a sequel. Director David F. Sandberg and producer Peter Safran were also expected to return. According to Sandberg, the plot point of Fawcett City, Philadelphia being trapped under a dome was inspired by The Simpsons Movie (2007). Later that month, Michelle Borth, who portrayed the adult superhero form of Mary Bromfield in the first film, said she signed a five-picture deal for the role and was expected to return for at least one sequel. Zachary Levi confirmed in June that he was returning to star as Shazam in the sequel, and revealed that writing had begun ahead of a planned filming start in mid-2020. Sandberg and much of the first film's crew were confirmed to return in December 2019, when New Line Cinema and Warner Bros. Pictures scheduled the sequel for release on April 1, 2022. This was delayed in April 2020 to November 4, 2022. due to the COVID-19 pandemic. In October 2020, the release date was once again shifted to June 2, 2023. Later release dates were December 16, 2022 and December 21, 2022. In August 2022, the final release date of March 17, 2023 was announced.

=== Pre-production ===
In June 2020, Marta Milans confirmed that she would reprise her role as foster mother Rosa Vásquez from the first film, and revealed that filming had been delayed by the pandemic. The film's title was revealed to be Shazam! Fury of the Gods during the virtual DC FanDome event in August 2020, with returning cast members confirmed including Asher Angel as teenager Billy Batson and Levi as his adult superhero counterpart, Jack Dylan Grazer as Frederick "Freddy" Freeman and Adam Brody as his adult counterpart, Faithe Herman as Darla Dudley and Meagan Good as her adult counterpart, Grace Fulton as Mary Bromfield, Ian Chen as Eugene Choi and Ross Butler as his adult counterpart, and Jovan Armand as Pedro Peña with D. J. Cotrona as his adult counterpart. The next month, Levi said filming would begin in early 2021.

The film's release was delayed again in October 2020, to June 2, 2023. The following month, Mark Strong said he was waiting to hear if he would be returning as Dr. Thaddeus Sivana in the sequel. In January 2021, Good said filming would begin that May, and Rachel Zegler was cast in an undisclosed "key role" the next month. Following her exhaustive filming schedule for Maria in West Side Story (2021), Zegler booked a meeting with the DCEU casting director Rich Delia, who was thinking about her for Kara Zor-El / Supergirl in The Flash (2023). Zegler lost out to Sasha Calle, but Delia told her that he thought that she could audition for Anthea in the Shazam sequel. During the COVID-19 pandemic, Zegler read on for the role through Zoom with Sandberg and Dylan Grazer, doing a chemistry test with the latter, who was instrumental in her casting due to Safran giving him the option to choose and Dylan Grazer chose Zegler out of admiration for her work in the West Side Story (1961) remake. Safran was producing the film through his company the Safran Company, while Geoff Johns was also set to produce. Johns was ultimately credited as an executive producer. In March, Helen Mirren was cast as Hespera, a daughter of Atlas, with Zegler reported to be playing Hespera's sister, Anthea. Lucy Liu was cast as Kalypso, another daughter of Atlas, the next month. Strong said in May that he would not appear in the sequel, and Cooper Andrews was confirmed to reprise his role as foster father Víctor Vásquez from the first film.

Chris Morgan contributed to the film's script. Early during the film's development, Sandberg wanted to bring back Mister Mind, a villainous character teased in the mid-credits scene of the first film whom Sandberg voiced, for the sequel in a bigger role, but his inclusion was ultimately dropped due to it requiring too much of the film's runtime, aside that he had to drop several other elements to not "overstuff" the film. In addition to bringing Gal Gadot back as Diana Prince / Wonder Woman, Sandberg initially planned to have cameo appearances of Kal-El / Clark Kent / Superman and Bruce Wayne / Batman by showing Superman unsuccessfully trying to break the dome while Batman just stands there and looks at Superman.

=== Filming ===
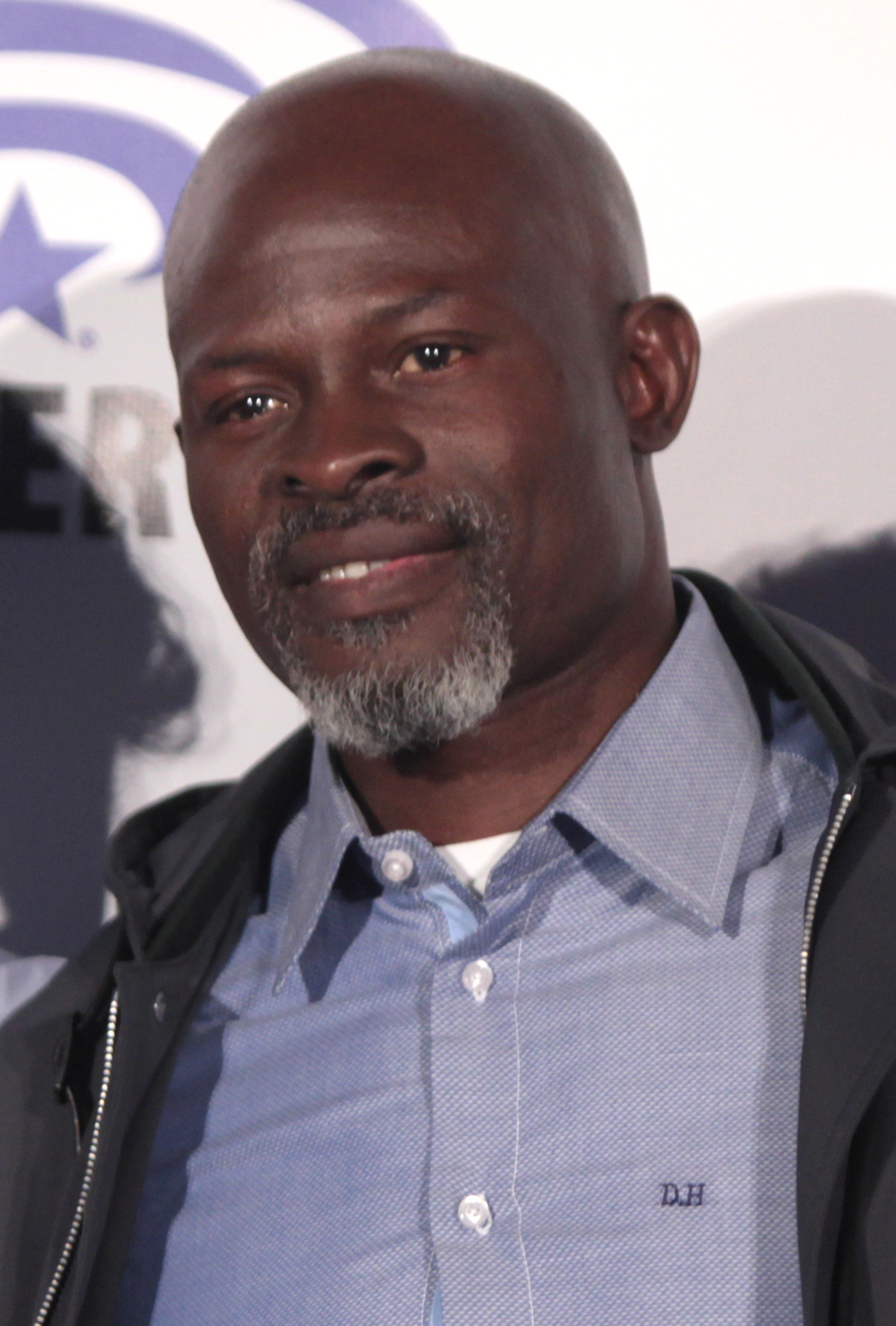
Djimon Hounsou returned for the role as Shazam in the sequel

Principal photography began on May 26, 2021, in Atlanta, Georgia, with Gyula Pados serving as cinematographer. Production on the film was delayed from an initial mid-2020 start due to the COVID-19 pandemic. Production was begun with the help of PandemicProof Productions overseeing covid compliance, including a scientifically rigorous air monitoring protocol designed by Sabrina McCormick at George Washington University and Jacob Bueno de Mesquita at Lawrence Berkeley National Labs. In June, Sandberg revealed that Fulton was also portraying the adult superhero form of Mary in the film, replacing Borth, with Fulton's hair and makeup adjusted for the superhero version. A month later, set photos revealed that Djimon Hounsou would be reprising his role as the wizard. Filming concluded on August 31, 2021.

=== Post-production ===
In March 2022, Warner Bros. adjusted its release schedule due to the impacts of COVID-19 on the workload of visual effects vendors. The Flash and Aquaman and the Lost Kingdom were moved from 2022 to 2023 to allow time for their visual effects work to be completed, while Shazam! Fury of the Gods was moved up to Aquaman and the Lost Kingdom's previous release date of December 16, 2022, because it would be ready for release earlier. In April, the film's release date was pushed back five days to December 21 to avoid competition with Avatar: The Way of Water. Rizwan Manji was revealed to be appearing as an unnamed character in July 2022. Manji was suggested for the role by Safran, who also produced the DCEU television series Peacemaker in which Manji portrayed Jamil. Sandberg approved the casting, despite the series being set in the same universe as the film, because he thought Manji only had a small role in Peacemaker. He was surprised to learn that Manji has a significant role and appears in the opening title sequence of the series. Peacemaker creator James Gunn suggested that Manji's character in Fury of the Gods could be Jamil's brother. In August, after WarnerMedia merged with Discovery, Inc. to form Warner Bros. Discovery, the studio delayed the film to March 17, 2023 (again taking Aquaman and the Lost Kingdom's previous release date), to help spread out the marketing and distribution costs for its feature films. This also moved Fury of the Gods away from Avatar: The Way of Water. By the start of November, Sandberg confirmed that the final cut was complete and ready for release.

The final wave of the film's marketing campaign revealed Gal Gadot's cameo appearance as Diana Prince / Wonder Woman, reprising her role from prior DCEU movies. Sandberg was upset by this reveal, as he intended the cameo to be a surprise. The film's mid-credits scene sees Jennifer Holland and Steve Agee reprise their DCEU roles as Emilia Harcourt and John Economos. This scene was originally the post-credits scene of Shazam! spin-off film Black Adam (2022), and featured members of the Justice Society of America from that film, but Black Adam star Dwayne Johnson "vetoed" both moves, forcing Safran to bring in Holland and Agee. Strong and Sandberg reprise their roles in the film's post-credits scene.

The visual effects were made by DNEG, Pixomondo, Stereo D, Weta FX, Territory Studio, Method Studios, Static Chair Productions, RISE VFX, and Scanline VFX.

== Music ==
In June 2022, Sandberg revealed that composer and conductor Benjamin Wallfisch was unable to return from the first film due to scheduling conflicts with another DCEU film, The Flash (2023); his replacement, Christophe Beck, had already begun work by then. A single, "Shazam! Fury of the Gods (Main Title Theme)" was released as a digital single by WaterTower Music on February 23, 2023, and the soundtrack album was released on March 10.

== Marketing ==
Sandberg promoted the sequel during a virtual panel at the August 2020 DC FanDome event, announcing the film's title and returning cast. In June 2021, after a week of filming, Sandberg released a short clip featuring Levi in his new costume for the film; this came after several set photos of the costume were leaked that week. To head off of further costume leaks, Sandberg released images of Levi, Brody, Good, Currey, Butler and Cotrona in their new superhero costumes at the end of the month. Behind-the-scenes footage and concept art was revealed during the 2021 DC FanDome event in October, with io9's Rob Bricken and Collider's Gregory Lawrence expressing excitement at the new cast members, characters, locations and mythology. Levi, Angel, Grazer and Mirren promoted the film at Warner Bros.' CinemaCon panel in April 2022, where new footage was shown. The film was also promoted at San Diego Comic-Con in July, where the first trailer was released.

On March 14, Skittles partnered with Warner Bros. and DC Films to create commercials for the film. McFarlane Toys also partnered to create promotional toys, including action figures and dolls.

== Release ==
=== Theatrical ===
Shazam! Fury of the Gods premiered at Fox Village Theatre in Hollywood on March 14, 2023, and was released by Warner Bros. Pictures in the United States on March 17, 2023.

It was originally set for release on April 1, 2022 before being delayed to November 4, 2022, and then to June 2, 2023, due to the COVID-19 pandemic. It was then moved up to December 16, 2022, as it was ready for release sooner than other DC films delayed by the pandemic. That date was previously given to Aquaman and the Lost Kingdom. The release date was pushed back five days to December 21 in April 2022 to avoid competing with 20th Century Studios' Avatar: The Way of Water, before being moved to Aquaman and the Lost Kingdom's date again (March 2023) in August 2022 when Warner Bros. Discovery was trying to spread out marketing and distribution costs. This meant IMAX screens occupied by Avatar would be available for Shazam!.

=== Home media ===
Shazam! Fury of the Gods was released on premium video-on-demand services on April 7, 2023, ten days earlier than its scheduled April 17 release date. It was released on Ultra HD Blu-ray, Blu-ray and DVD on May 23, 2023. It began streaming on Max on the same day, becoming one of the launch titles of the rebranded service.

== Reception ==
=== Box office ===
Shazam! Fury of the Gods grossed $57.6 million in the United States and Canada, and $76.4 million in other territories, for a worldwide total of $134 million. Due to its $125 million production budget, the film was labeled a box-office bomb by analysts. (Note: Attributed to multiple references.)

In the United States and Canada, Shazam! Fury of the Gods was initially projected to gross $35–40 million from 4,071 theaters in its opening weekend. The film made $11.7 million on Friday (including $3.4 million from Thursday night previews), lowering weekend estimates to $30 million. It went on to debut to $30.1 million (52.2% of total gross), topping the box office but marking a 44% drop from the first film's opening weekend ($53.5 million) and the third-lowest of the DCEU (though the two lower films, The Suicide Squad and Wonder Woman 1984, had their releases affected by the COVID-19 pandemic and were simultaneously released on HBO Max). Boxoffice Pro's Shawn Robbins called the debut "a soft start, there's no other way to put it," noting the recent underperformances of other comic book films. The Hollywood Reporter called the domestic opening "one of the worst starts for a major Hollywood superhero film" and also lamented the film's $35 million international opening from 78 countries (including "bombing" in China with $4.3 million). The A.V. Club noted that it premiered on a weekend where other films experienced dull box office numbers.

In its second weekend, the film dropped 69% to $9.3 million, finishing second behind newcomer John Wick: Chapter 4. It made $4.6 million in its third weekend, dropping to sixth place.

=== Critical response ===
On the review aggregator website Rotten Tomatoes, 49% of 263 critics' reviews are positive, with an average rating of 5.6/10. The website's consensus reads: "More unfocused and less satisfying than its predecessor, Shazam! Fury of the Gods still retains almost enough of the source material's silly charm to save the day." Metacritic, which uses a weighted average, assigned the film a score of 47 out of 100, based on 49 critics, indicating "mixed or average" reviews. Audiences surveyed by CinemaScore gave the film an average grade of "B+" on an A+ to F scale, while those polled by PostTrak gave it a 78% positive score, with 64% saying they would definitely recommend it.

Frank Scheck of The Hollywood Reporter gave the film an average review, writing: "Like some children who aren't so cute anymore after they've grown up a little, this follow-up lacks much of the appeal of its predecessor. While the film provides the elaborate action-set pieces, colorful villains and save-the-world plot mechanics expected of the comic-book-movie genre, some of the magic is missing." Chicago Sun-Times's Richard Roeper gave the film two out of four stars, writing, "As we pick up Billy/Shazam's story about four years later, it quickly becomes apparent this is just going to be a by-the-numbers, second-tier adventure with only a few small chuckles and one or two genuinely touching moments. The rest is just noise." Kevin Maher of The Times gave it one out of five stars, calling it a "vacuous and disappointing sequel" and writing, "The tedious reincarnation trope is, however, the least of the narrative misfires in a film that borrows its central dramatic device from The Simpsons Movie."

Peter Bradshaw of The Guardian gave it three out of five stars, saying, "we don't entirely break free of the superhero-movie template, but Shazam two has a just-out-of-the-fridge orange juice taste that makes it likable." The Sydney Morning Herald's Sandra Hall gave it 3.5 out of 5 stars, saying, "the film does the job as an engaging send-up of superheros and their affectations. It plays like a junior variation on Marvel's comic hit Deadpool, with goofiness standing in for the f--- word and gallows humour."

=== Responses from cast and crew ===
Following the film's poor financial performance, Sandberg expressed surprise at its critical reception and said, "After six years of Shazam I'm definitely done with superheroes for now." Levi said of the film's reception, "The audience score is still quite good, but the critics' score was very oddly and perplexingly low, and people were insanely unkind." He also criticized the film's marketing.

=== Accolades ===
Shazam! Fury of the Gods received nominations for Golden Fleece and Best Wildposts at the 2023 Golden Trailer Awards. At the 44th Golden Raspberry Awards, the film was nominated for Worst Picture, Worst Actress for Mirren, Worst Supporting Actress for Liu and Worst Screenplay.

== Future ==
In January 2023, DC Films co-CEOs James Gunn and Safran said there was potential for Levi to reprise his role in the new franchise, the DC Universe (DCU), but a decision on the character had not been made. Sandberg said the next month that he was told his films did not contradict Gunn and Safran's plans and that the character's potential return would depend on the film's reception. Following the film's disappointing box-office performance, Levi cast doubt on any future installments.
