= Alicia Vela-Bailey =

American stunt performer and actress (born 1982)

- Born: July 8, 1982 (age 44); California, United States
- Occupations: Stunt performer, stunt double, actress, dancer, choreographer
- Years active: 2005–present
- Spouse: Matt Mullins

Alicia Frances Vela-Bailey (born July 8, 1982) is an American stunt performer, actress, dancer, and choreographer. Vela-Bailey was a stunt double for leading actresses in films Avatar (2009), Total Recall (2012), Underworld: Awakening (2012), Divergent (2014), Lucy (2014), Underworld: Blood Wars (2016), Wonder Woman (2017), Avatar: The Way of Water (2023), and Avatar: Fire and Ash (2025).

Vela-Bailey also had several acting roles, predominately in horror films, including portraying Diana, a main antagonist in the 2016 supernatural horror film Lights Out, also appearing in Hostel: Part III (2011), The Purge (2013), Underworld: Blood Wars (2016), and Annabelle: Creation (2017). Additionally, Vela-Bailey portrayed recurring characters in television series, including Alisha Whitley in the ABC superhero action drama series Agents of S.H.I.E.L.D. (2014), and Owl in Disney+ superhero dark comedy fantasy series Agatha All Along (2024).

== Biography ==
Alicia Vela-Bailey was born on July 8, 1982, in California, United States, and grew up in Kailua-Kona, Hawaii, United States. She is a daughter of magician Carlos Armando from El Salvador, and dancer Cecelia Vela-Bailey from North Carolina, United States. She practiced dancing and gymnastics since her youth. Vela-Bailey used to a be member of the Pussycat Dolls dance group, which performed at the Caesars Palace luxury hotel and casino at the Las Vegas Strip in Nevada, United States. She is also a professional dancer, practicing classical ballet, jazz, and hip-hop, among other styles. Vela-Bailey began her career as a stunt performer, working on the production of the 2005 action film BloodRayne, and the 2006 science fiction action film Ultraviolet, as the stunt double of their lead actresses, Kristanna Loken and Milla Jovovich, respectively. For her performance in the latter production, she was nominated for two categories at the 2007 Taurus World Stunt Awards.

Vela-Bailey was a stunt double for leading actress Zoe Saldaña, who starred as Neytiri in the 2009 20th Century Studios epic science fiction film Avatar. She was also a movement specialist, being a key figure in developing choreography for the characters, and training actors working with the motion capture. Additionally, she also portrayed Ikeyni, a minor character in the film. Following this, she was a stunt double for lead actresses in numerous movies, including for Jennifer Lawrence in X-Men: First Class (2011), Kate Beckinsale in Total Recall (2012), Underworld: Awakening (2012), and Underworld: Blood Wars (2016), Anne Hathaway in Interstellar (2014), Scarlett Johansson in Lucy (2014), Shailene Woodley in Divergent (2014), and Gal Gadot in Batman v Superman: Dawn of Justice (2016) and Wonder Woman (2017). She was also a stunt double and stunt performer in television series such as Agent Carter (2015), K.C. Undercover (2015), Westworld (2015), The Punisher (2017), The Defenders (2017), Luke Cage (2018).

Vela-Bailey had several acting roles, prominently in horror films, including portraying Diana, a main antagonist in the 2016 Warner Bros. Pictures supernatural horror film Lights Out. She also appeared in Hostel: Part III (2011), The Purge (2013), Underworld: Blood Wars (2016), and Annabelle: Creation (2017). Additionally, Vela-Bailey portrayed recurring characters in television series, including Alisha Whitley in the ABC superhero action drama series Agents of S.H.I.E.L.D. (2014), and Owl in Disney+ superhero dark comedy fantasy series Agatha All Along.

She was a stunt double for actresses Zoe Saldaña and Sigourney Weaver in the epic science fiction films Avatar: The Way of Water (2022), and Avatar: Fire and Ash (2025), also training actors on set in the choreography. Vela-Bailey also portrayed a secondary character named Zdinarsik "Z-Dog" in Avatar: The Way of Water. She was also a stunt double for Saldaña in the 2023 Marvel Studios science fiction superhero film Guardians of the Galaxy Vol. 3, and also worked as a stunt double and stunt performer on television series The Orville (2022), Star Wars: Ahsoka (2023), and The Mandalorian (2023).

== Personal life ==
She is married to actor and martial artist Matt Mullins.

== Filmography ==
=== Films ===
Acting roles
| Year | Title | Role | Notes |
|---|---|---|---|
| 2009 | Avatar | Blonde woman in a bar | Feature film; special edition cut and collector's extended cut |
| 2009 | Avatar | Ikeyni | Feature film |
| 2009 | Avatar | Operations center employee | Feature film; deleted scene |
| 2009 | Avatar | Saeyla | Feature film |
| 2011 | Hostel: Part III | Japanese cyberpunk woman | Feature film |
| 2013 | The Purge | Blonde woman freak purger | Feature film |
| 2014 | The Purge: Anarchy | Blonde woman freak purger | Feature film; archival footage |
| 2015 | Hollywood Adventures | Hot girl #2 | Feature film |
| 2015 | Spy | Woman from Paris | Feature film |
| 2016 | Lights Out | Diana | Feature film |
| 2016 | Underworld: Blood Wars | Safehouse Lycan | Feature film |
| 2017 | Annabelle: Creation | Demon hands | Feature film |
| 2017 | Annabelle: Creation | Evil Mullins | Feature film |
| 2022 | Avatar: The Way of Water | Zdinarsik "Z-Dog" | Feature film |
| 2023 | Hollywood's Hard Hitters: Women in Action | Herself | Documentary film |
| 2023 | Inside Pandora's Box | Herself | Documentary film |
| 2025 | Avatar: Fire and Ash | Additional background characters | Feature film |
| 2025 | Avatar: Fire and Ash | Ikeyni | Feature film |
| 2025 | Avatar: Fire and Ash | Reporter in Bridgehead City | Feature film |

Stunt work
| Year | Title | Role | Notes |
|---|---|---|---|
| 2003 | The Animatrix: Final Flight of the Osiris | Gymnast | Short film |
| 2005 | BloodRayne | Stunt double for Kristanna Loken (as Rayne) | Feature film |
| 2006 | Ultraviolet | Stunt double for Milla Jovovich (as Violet Song Jat Shariff) | Feature film |
| 2008 | The Ruins | Utility stunt performer | Feature film |
| 2009 | Avatar | Stunt double for Zoe Saldaña (as Neytiri); also movement specialist | Feature film |
| 2009 | The Fourth Kind | Stunt double | Feature film |
| 2009 | G-Force | Utility stunt performer | Feature film |
| 2009 | Transformers: Revenge of the Fallen | Utility stunt performer | Feature film |
| 2010 | Alice in Wonderland | Stunt performer as Red Queen's female townspeople | Feature film |
| 2010 | Little Fockers | Stunt performer | Feature film |
| 2010 | Piranha 3D | Stunt double for Riley Steele (as Crystal) | Feature film |
| 2010 | Tales of an Ancient Empire | Stunt double for Melissa Ordway (as Princess Tanis) | Feature film |
| 2010 | Tales of an Ancient Empire | Stunt double for Jennifer Siebel Newsom (as Queen Ma'at) | Feature film |
| 2011 | I Am Number Four | Stunt performer | Feature film |
| 2011 | Just Go with It | Dance double for Nicole Kidman (as Devlin Adams) | Feature film |
| 2011 | Mars Needs Moms | Stunt performer | Feature film |
| 2011 | Transformers: Dark of the Moon | Stunt double for Rosie Huntington-Whiteley (as Carly Spencer); also stunt performer | Feature film |
| 2011 | X-Men: First Class | Stunt double for Jennifer Lawrence (as Mystique) | Feature film; uncredited |
| 2011 | Zookeeper | Dance double | Feature film |
2012
| 2012 | Total Recall | Stunt double for Kate Beckinsale (as Lori) | Feature film |
| 2012 | Underworld: Awakening | Stunt double for Kate Beckinsale (as Selene); also stunt performer | Feature film |
| 2013 | Ender's Game | Stunt double and stunt performer | Feature film |
| 2013 | Iron Man 3 | Stunt performer | Feature film |
| 2013 | Percy Jackson: Sea of Monsters | Stunt double for Alexandra Daddario (as Annabeth Chase) | Feature film |
| 2014 | Divergent | Stunt double for Shailene Woodley (as Tris Prior) | Feature film |
| 2014 | Lucy | Stunt double for Scarlett Johansson (as Lucy Miller) | Feature film |
| 2014 | Flight 7500 | Stunt double for Leslie Bibb (as Laura Baxter) | Feature film |
| 2014 | Interstellar | Stunt double for Anne Hathaway (as Amelia Brand) | Feature film |
| 2015 | Accidental Love | Utility stunt performer | Feature film |
| 2015 | Salem Rogers | Stunt double for Leslie Bibb (as Salem Rogers) | Television film |
| 2015 | Spy | Stunt double and stunt performer | Feature film |
| 2016 | Batman v Superman: Dawn of Justice | Stunt double for Gal Gadot (as Wonder Woman); also stunt performer | Feature film |
| 2016 | Keeping Up with the Joneses | Stunt double for Gal Gadot (as Natalie Jones) | Feature film |
| 2016 | Marvel's Most Wanted | Stunt double for Adrianne Palicki (as Bobbi Morse) | Television film |
| 2016 | Underworld: Blood Wars | Stunt double for Kate Beckinsale (as Selene); also stunt performer | Feature film |
| 2017 | Wonder Woman | Stunt double for Gal Gadot (as Wonder Woman); also stunt performer | Feature film |
| 2019 | Alita: Battle Angel | Stunt double for Eiza González (as Nyssiana); also stunt performer | Feature film; uncredited |
| 2022 | Avatar: The Way of Water | Stunt double for Zoe Saldaña (as Neytiri) | Feature film |
| 2022 | Avatar: The Way of Water | Stunt double for Sigourney Weaver (as Kiri) | Feature film |
| 2023 | Guardians of the Galaxy Vol. 3 | Stunt double for Zoe Saldaña (as Gamora) | Feature film |
| 2024 | Road House | Stunt performer | Feature film |
| 2025 | Avatar: Fire and Ash | Stunt double for Zoe Saldaña (as Neytiri) | Feature film |
| 2025 | Avatar: Fire and Ash | Stunt double for Sigourney Weaver (as Kiri) | Feature film |
| 2026 | The Mandalorian and Grogu | Stunt performer | Feature film |
| 2026 | The Odyssey | Stunt performer as the stunt siren #5 | Feature film |

=== Television series ===
Acting roles
| Year | Title | Role | Notes |
|---|---|---|---|
| 2013 | True Blood | Fairy #2 | Episode: "You're No Good"; uncredited |
| 2014 | New Girl | Baby shower guest | Episode: "Girl Fight"; uncredited |
| 2015–2016 | Agents of S.H.I.E.L.D. | Alisha Whitley | Recurring role; 6 episodes |
| 2017 | Future Man | Woman biotic police officer #2 | Episode: "Girth, Wind & Fire"; uncredited |
| 2024 | Agatha All Along | Owl | Recurring role; 6 episodes |
| 2024 | Marvel Studios: Assembled | Herself | Documentary series; episode "The Making of Agatha All Along" |
| 2025 | NCIS | Reactor #5 | Episode: "Killer Instinct" |

Stunt work
| Year | Title | Role | Notes |
|---|---|---|---|
| 2007 | Two and a Half Men | Stunt performer | Episode: "That's Summer Sausage, Not Salami"; uncredited |
| 2008 | Eli Stone | Dancer | Episode: "Praying for Time" |
| 2008 | The Office | Utility stunt performer | Episode: "Night Out" |
| 2008 | Unhitched | Utility stunt performer | Episode: "Mardi Gras Croc Attack" |
| 2009 | America's Got Talent | Dancer | 9 episodes; uncredited |
| 2009 | Criminal Minds | Stunt double for Patty Malcolm (as Ann Herron) | Episode: "The Slave of Duty"; uncredited |
| 2010 | 82nd Academy Awards | Dancer | Television special; uncredited |
| 2010 | Southland | Stunt double for Arija Bareikis (as Chickie Brown) | Episode: "Maximum Deployment" |
| 2011–2012 | Chuck | Stunt double for Yvonne Strahovski (as Sarah Walker) | 3 episodes |
| 2012–2014 | Revolution | Stunt double for Tracy Spiridakos (as Charlie Matheson) | 15 episodes; uncredited |
| 2012–2014 | Revolution | Stunt double for Daniella Alonso (as Nora Clayton) | 3 episodes; uncredited |
| 2012–2014 | Revolution | Stunt double for Elizabeth Mitchell (as Rachel Matheson) | 2 episodes; uncredited |
| 2012–2014 | Revolution | Stunt performer | 2 episodes; uncredited |
| 2013 | True Blood | Stunt performer | Episode: "The Sun" |
| 2014 | Jimmy Kimmel Live! | Stunt double for Shailene Woodley | Episode: "Shailene Woodley/Theo James/Zedd" |
| 2014 | New Girl | Stunt performer | Episode: "Girl Fight" |
| 2014–2015 | Agents of S.H.I.E.L.D. | Stunt double for Adrianne Palicki (as Bobbi Morse) | 11 episodes |
| 2015 | Agent Carter | Stunt double for Bridget Regan (as Dottie Underwood) | 2 episodes |
| 2015 | Agent Carter | Stunt double | Episode: "The Blitzkrieg Button |
| 2015 | Grimm | Stunt double for Elizabeth Tulloch (as Juliette Silverton as a creature) | Episode: "Maréchaussée" |
| 2015 | K.C. Undercover | Stunt double for Zendaya (as K.C. Cooper) | 3 episodes |
| 2015 | Stitchers | Stunt double for Emma Ishta (as Kirsten Clark) | 2 episodes |
| 2015 | Teen Wolf | Stunt double for Shelley Hennig (as Malia Tate) | Episode: "Dreamcatchers" |
| 2015 | Westworld | Stunt performer | Episode: "The Original" |
| 2015–2016 | Rizzoli & Isles | Stunt double for Angie Harmon (as Jane Clementine Rizzoli) | 2 episodes |
| 2017 | Bull | Stunt double for Justine Lupe (as Ginny Bretton) | Episode: "E.J." |
| 2017 | The Defenders | Assistant stunt coordinator | 8 episodes; uncredited |
| 2017 | The Defenders | Stunt performer | 3 episodes; uncredited |
| 2017 | The Defenders | Stunt double for Sigourney Weaver (as Alexandra Reid) | 2 episodes; uncredited |
| 2017 | Hawaii Five-0 | Stunt performer | Episode: "He ke'u na ka 'alae a Hin" |
| 2017 | Jean-Claude Van Johnson | Stunt double for Bar Paly (as Krisztina) | Episode: "The World Needs Its Hero" |
| 2017 | The Punisher | Stunt double for Deborah Ann Woll (as Karen Page) | Episode: "Virtue of the Vicious"; uncredited |
| 2018 | Luke Cage | Assistant stunt coordinator | 13 episodes; uncredited |
| 2018 | Luke Cage | Stunt performer | 2 episodes; uncredited |
| 2020 | L.A.'s Finest | Stunt performer | 2 episodes; 1 episode uncredited |
| 2021 | American Horror Story | Stunt double for Rebecca Dayan (as Maria Wycoff) | Episode: "Inside" |
| 2021 | Made for Love | Stunt coordinator | Episode: "I Want a Lawyer" |
| 2022 | Gaslit | Stunt double for Julia Roberts (as Martha Mitchell) | 4 episodes |
| 2022 | Gaslit | Stunt coordinator | Episode: "Will" |
| 2022 | The Orville | Stunt double for Adrianne Palicki (as Kelly Grayson) | 3 episodes |
| 2022 | Westworld | Stunt double for Saffron Burrows (as Anastasia Whitney) | Episode: "Well Enough Alon" |
| 2023 | Star Wars: Ahsoka | Stunt double for Ivanna Sakhno (as Shin Hati) | 5 episodes |
| 2023 | Star Wars: Ahsoka | Stunt double | Episode: "Part Two: Toil and Trouble" |
| 2023 | The Mandalorian | Stunt performer | Episode: "Chapter 18: The Mines of Mandalore" |
| 2024 | Cobra Kai | Stunt performer | Episode: "Benvinguts a Barcelona" |
| 2024 | Presumed Innocent | Stunt performer | Episode: "The Verdict" |
| 2025 | Countdown | Stunt performer | Episode: "The Muzzle Pile" |
| 2025 | Monster | Stunt double for Vicky Krieps (as Ilse Koch) | 2 episodes |
| 2025 | Monster | Stunt performer | Episode: "Ice" |
| 2025 | Paradise | Fight choreographer | 3 episodes |
| 2025 | Paradise | Stunt double for Shailene Woodley (as Annie Clay) | Episode: "A Holy Charge" |
| 2025 | Paradise | Stunt double for Nicole Brydon Bloom (as Jane Driscoll); also stunt coordinator | Episode: "Jane" |
| 2025 | The Madison | Stunt double for Elle Chapman (as Paige McIntosh) | Episode: "Pilot" |
| 2025 | The Madison | Stunt performer | 2 episodes |

=== Video games ===
Stunt work
| Year | Title | Role |
|---|---|---|
| 2023 | Avatar: Frontiers of Pandora | Movement coach and movement specialist |

=== Music videos ===
Stunt work
| Year | Title | Role |
|---|---|---|
| 2010 | "Crossfire" by Brandon Flowers | Stunt double for Charlize Theron (as herself) |
