= Lotta Losten =

Swedish actress (born 1981)

- Born: 7 November 1981 (age 44); Jönköping, Sweden
- Occupations: Actress, designer, photographer
- Spouse: David F. Sandberg (m. 2013)

Lotta Losten (born 7 November 1981) is a Swedish actress, designer, and photographer. She is best known for her collaborations with her husband David F. Sandberg, including the 2013 short film Lights Out, the 2016 feature film adaptation of the same name, and Shazam!.

== Career ==
Lotta made her film debut in the short film Cam Closer (2013), about a phone that can see the future. She and her husband, filmmaker David F. Sandberg, created the 2013 short film Lights Out, where she plays a woman who is haunted by a creature that moves in the dark, but does not appear if the lights are on. According to Sandberg, the movie cost practically nothing to make and was originally something they just wanted to have fun with. They submitted the film to the Bloody Cuts Horror Challenge where the film was a finalist, and Sandberg won Best Director. Some months later, the short film became popular online, going from about 8000 views to over a million, and attracting Hollywood directors and producers.

Since 2014, Losten has starred in several short films including See You Soon (2014), Pictured (2014), Not So Fast (2014), Coffer (2014), Attic Panic (2015) and Closet Space (2016). In the feature film of Lights Out, released in 2016, she plays Esther, the co-worker in the opening scene who encounters Diana Walter. She also has a small role in Shazam! (2019).

== Personal life ==
Losten was born in Jönköping, Sweden. She has been married to director David F. Sandberg since 2013. She studied theatre history and gender studies at Lund University and studied acting at Blekinge läns folkhögskola for two years.

== Filmography ==
=== Short films ===
Year	Title	Role	Notes
2013	Cam Closer	Woman	
2013	Lights Out	Woman	
2014	See You Soon	Woman	
2014	Pictured	Woman	
2014	Not So Fast	Woman	
2014	Coffer	Woman	
2015	Attic Panic	Woman	
2016	Closet Space	Lotta	
2016	That Party That One Night	Party Kid	
2017	Who Decides	Nurse	
2020	Shadowed	Woman	
2020	Not Alone in Here	Woman	
2023	Cam Closer II	Woman	

=== Feature films ===
Year	Title	Role	Notes
2016	Lights Out	Esther	
2017	Annabelle: Creation	Adoption Agent	
2017	Broken English	Editor in Chief	Miniseries
2019	Shazam!	Dr. Lynn Crosby	
2023	Shazam! Fury of the Gods	Civilian	
2025	Until Dawn	Reporter	Producer
