= Faithe Herman =

American actress

Faithe C. Herman
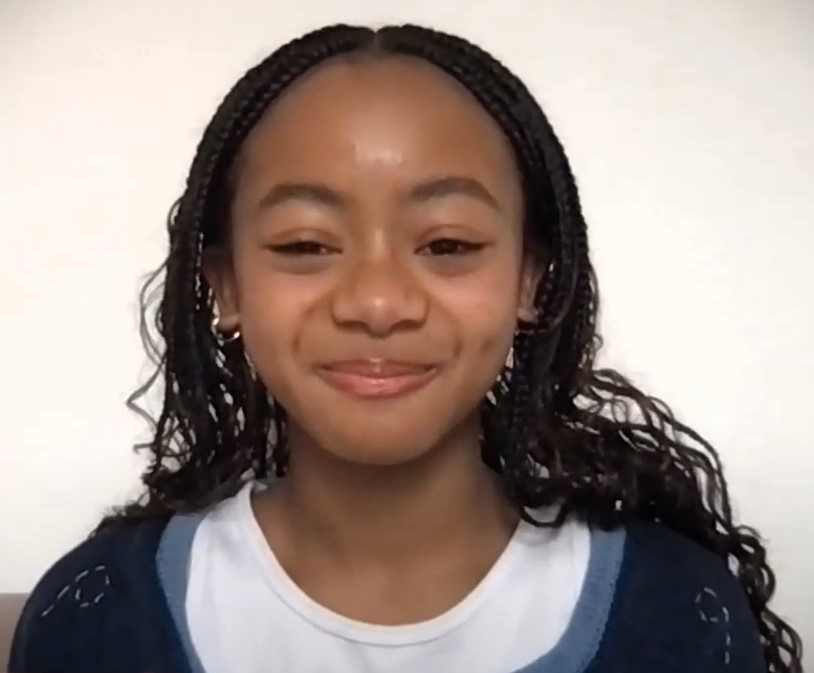
- Herman in 2022
- Born: December 27, 2007 (age 18); San Diego, California, U.S.
- Occupation: Actress
- Years active: 2016–present
- Notable work: This Is Us; Shazam!; Shazam! Fury of the Gods

Faithe Herman (born December 27, 2007) is an American actress, best known for her work in This Is Us (2016), Shazam! (2019) and Shazam! Fury of the Gods (2023).

== Personal life ==
Herman was born in 2007 and lives in San Diego, California. Her father, Karvarees, worked in the United States Navy. Her mother's name is Donna. She is the youngest child of five siblings including three sisters Aaysia, Esence, and Ceymone. Herman took ballet classes at age seven for two years. She attends public school.

== Career ==
Herman started acting at age five, alongside her sisters. They first did background work with Kids Management, after which her mother signed them up with an agent.

Her breakout role was as Annie Pearson in the 2016 television show This Is Us. Before securing the role of Annie, she initially memorized the lines for both the roles of Annie and her sister Tess, not knowing for which role she was auditioning. Following the success of This Is Us, Herman starred in 2018 in a Subaru commercial and landed her first major film role in Shazam!, released in 2019, as Darla Dudley. She reprised the role in the sequel Shazam! Fury of the Gods (2023).

== Accolades ==
Herman won two Screen Actors Guild Awards in the same category for Outstanding Performance by an Ensemble in a Drama Series for her work on This Is Us, in 2018 and 2019.

== Filmography ==
=== Film ===
Year	Title	Role	Notes
2017	Bodied	Grace	
2019	The Flourish	Jasmine	Short film
2019	Shazam!	Darla Dudley	
2023	Shazam! Fury of the Gods	Darla Dudley	

=== Television ===
Year	Title	Role	Notes
2016	Criminal Minds	Morgan Kid	Episode: "Derek"
2016–22	This Is Us	Annie Pearson	83 episodes
2019	Watchmen	Young Angela Abar	Episode: "An Almost Religious Awe"
