= The Flourish =

2019 film directed by Shannon Taylor

- Poster
- Directed by: Shannon Taylor
- Screenplay by: Brit Taylor
- Story by: Anthony Maze
- Produced by: Anthony Maze; Shannon Taylor
- Starring: Faithe Herman; Mark Christopher Lawrence; Saffran Harris; Sidney Franklin
- Cinematography: Mark De Leon
- Edited by: Mark De Leon
- Music by: Steve Garbade
- Production company: Taylor Way Productions
- Release date: October 14, 2019
- Country: United States
- Language: English

The Flourish is a 2019 American short film directed by Shannon Taylor from a screenplay by Brit Taylor. It stars Faithe Herman, Mark Christopher Lawrence, Saffran Harris, and Sidney Franklin. Herman won the Indie Spirit Award Performance by a Child Actor at Idyllwild International Festival of Cinema.

== Cast ==
- Faithe Herman as Jasmine
- Mark Christopher Lawrence as Dennis
- Saffran Harris as Sarah
- Sidney Franklin as Tom "Top Hat Tom"
- Amiyah Hersey as Lizzy
- Ruth Stehle as Althea
- Ki Lencie as Adult Jasmine
- Hanna Marie Brown as Adult Lizzy
- Dimitri Greene as Stewart
- Nautica Avila as Ava
- Shannon Taylor as Theresa
- Hailey Altamirano as Talent Show Kid Ukulele Player

== Production ==
The film was made over the course of 60 days for Her Film Challenge, a competition for women writers and directors. So Say We All vetted the stories prior and the event was presented by Film Consortium San Diego.

== Release ==
The film screened at the San Diego International Film Festival in 2020.

== Accolades ==
Event	Year	Award	Recipient(s)	Result	Ref.
San Diego Film Awards	2020	Best Child Actor: Narrative Short Film	Faithe Herman	Won	
Idyllwild International Festival of Cinema	2021	Indie Spirit Award Performance by a Child Actor	Faithe Herman	Won	
National Academy of Television Arts and Sciences	2021	Pacific Southwest Emmy Award for Talent – Performer/Narrator	Faithe Herman	Nominated	
National Academy of Television Arts and Sciences	2021	Pacific Southwest Emmy Award for Talent – Performer/Narrator	Mark Christopher Lawrence	Nominated	
