= Lawrence Grey (producer) =

Canadian-American film and television producer

Lawrence Grey is a Canadian-American film and television producer.

Grey launched his production company Grey Matter Productions in 2013. Grey Matter's first film, Lights Out, was released by Warner Bros. and New Line Cinema on July 22, 2016.

== Career ==
=== Early career ===
In 1998, Grey graduated from Georgetown University Law Center. He launched his producing career as a studio executive, serving as Executive Vice President and Co-Head of Production for Mandate Pictures from 2009–2011 and Senior Vice President of Production at Universal Pictures from 2006‑2009.

From 2000 to 2006, Grey was an executive at Fox Searchlight Pictures. During his time there, Grey found the script for Juno, which he packaged with director Jason Reitman and oversaw through production. While at Searchlight, Grey also oversaw the acquisition and production of the action-fantasy films Night Watch and Day Watch from Russian filmmaker Timur Bekmambetov, who went on to direct Wanted. He developed Diary of a Mad Black Woman, Tyler Perry's first film. Additionally, he oversaw The Hills Have Eyes from French director Alexandre Aja, Johnson Family Vacation, The Ringer, and 28 Weeks Later.

Grey co-produced the 2012 film Hope Springs starring Meryl Streep, Tommy Lee Jones and Steve Carell and directed by David Frankel (The Devil Wears Prada). He was the executive producer of the 2013 film Last Vegas, which starred Michael Douglas, Robert De Niro, Morgan Freeman, and Kevin Kline, and was directed by Jon Turteltaub.

=== Grey Matter Productions ===
Grey launched his production banner Grey Matter Productions in 2013.

Grey Matter released its first feature film, Lights Out, which is based on the short film by David Sandberg. Sandberg also directed the feature adaptation, which was written by Eric Heisserer and produced alongside James Wan's production banner Atomic Monster.

Previously, Grey sold Section 6, a film about the untold origin story of MI6, to Universal. The project will be directed by Joe Cornish (Attack the Block). Grey also developed and sold Winter's Knight, a Viking‑themed reimagining of the Santa Claus legend to Sony Pictures.

In 2014, Grey Matter announced a partnership with the Bruce Lee estate to develop and produce the definitive biopic on the famous martial artist.

In 2016, STX Entertainment and Grey Matter Productions announced an upcoming thriller starring Sylvester Stallone. The film, written by Dan Casey and to be directed by Jim Mickle, will go into production in late 2016. Grey Matter also announced that it will produce a feature film about the recent Panama Papers scandal. Steven Soderbergh is also producing with an eye to direct, alongside Scott Z. Burns. The film is to be based on an upcoming book Secrecy World that Pulitzer Prize-winning journalist Jake Bernstein is writing for Henry Holt and Company. Grey is teamed with Anonymous Content to develop, finance and produce. Grey, Michael Sugar, Burns and Soderbergh are producing.

== Filmography ==
Year	Title	Director	Role
2012	Hope Springs	David Frankel	Co-producer
2013	Last Vegas	Jon Turteltaub	Executive producer
2015	Hidden	Duffer Brothers	
2016	Lights Out	David F. Sandberg	
2019	The Laundromat	Steven Soderbergh	
2021	Yes Day	Miguel Arteta	
2023	Pain Hustlers	David Yates	
2023	Family Switch	McG	
2026	The Man with the Bag	Adam Shankman	
TBA	Bitcoin	Doug Liman	
