= Alexander DiPersia =

American actor (born 1982)

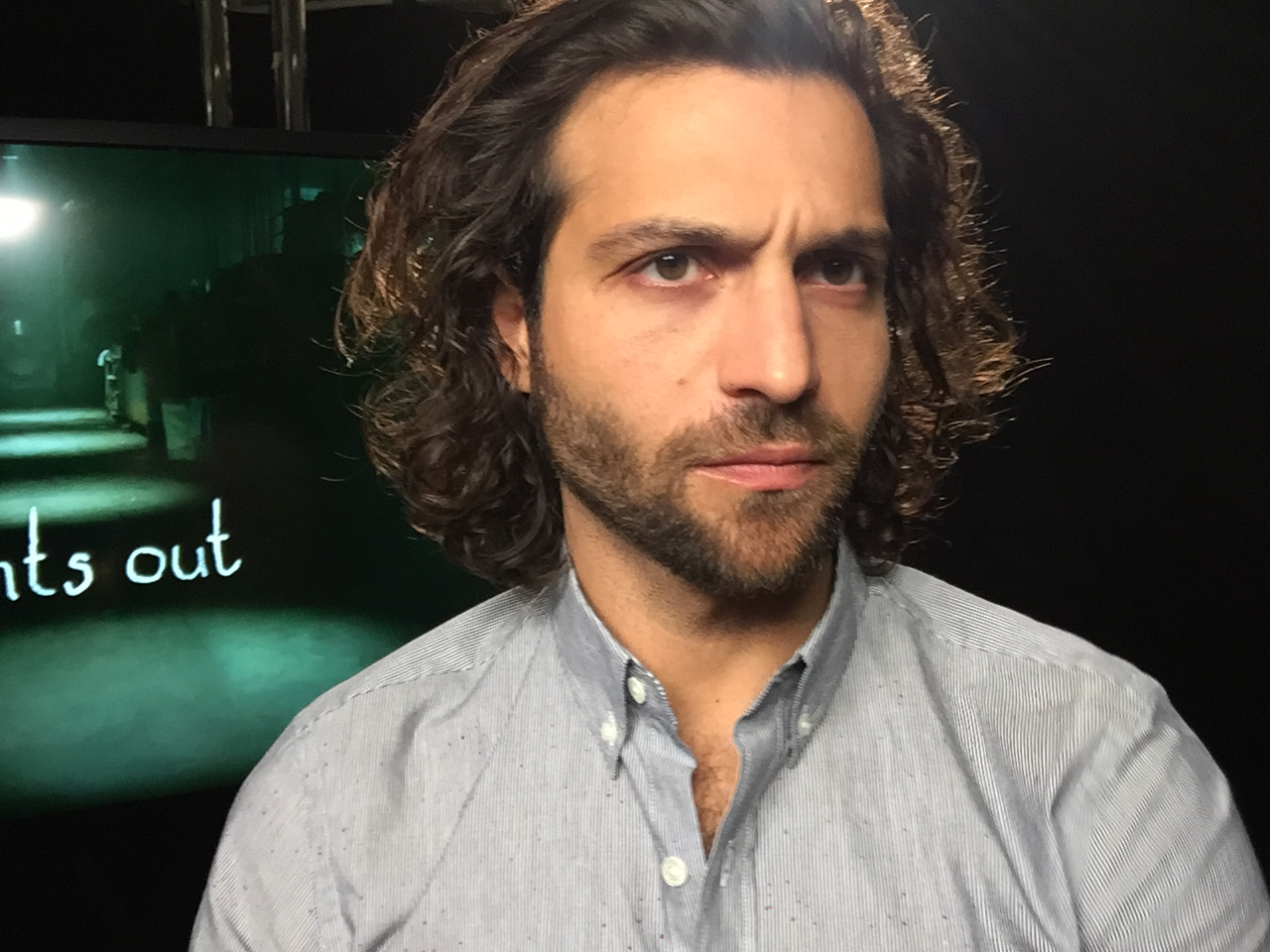
- DiPersia in 2016
- Born: Alexander John DiPersia; March 6, 1982 (age 44); New York, New York, United States
- Occupation: Actor
- Years active: 2007–present

Alexander John DiPersia (born March 6, 1982) is an American actor known for his role in the 2016 horror film Lights Out. DiPersia's first role was a minor cameo in the 2007 survival horror film I Am Legend.

== Life and career ==
DiPersia was raised in between Southport, Connecticut and Manhattan, New York, the son of Ronna (Kaufman), an artist, and John DiPersia, a lawyer. His grandfather, Robert Kaufman, was a prominent real estate developer. After attending the Hopkins School in New Haven, he moved to Boston to attend Boston College, where he majored in philosophy. His most recent role is starring in the Warner Brothers horror film Lights Out, alongside Teresa Palmer and Maria Bello. He is also shooting a major recurring role in the Amazon drama series Good Girls Revolt. He stars as a war veteran who attempts to restart his life after being deeply affected by his time in Vietnam. He also starred in a two-part series of short films directed by Diego Luna and Gael García Bernal, titled "Drifting: Part 1" (Luna) and "Drifting: Part 2" (Garcia Bernal), as well as the drama "Thorns", that screened at both the Cannes and Venice Film Festivals.

DiPersia’s additional film credits include a role in I Am Legend, starring Will Smith and An American Carol with Kelsey Grammer. On the small screen, he has appeared on FOX’s Gotham and CBS' NCIS: New Orleans. DiPersia played Marco Vitturi in Lovestruck: The Musical.

DiPersia is also an active member of the New York art world as a collector, curator, and advisor. He builds collections and focuses on interior design as it relates to the art for clients. He has worked for lobbies in New York as well as the permanent collection for the new buildings in New York’s Hudson Yards. He lives and works in SoHo, Manhattan.

== Filmography ==
Film and television
Year	Title	Role	Notes
2007	I Am Legend	Male Evacuee #2	
2008	An American Carol	Rehearsal Actor	
2009	90210	Jeremy	
2010	Father vs. Son	Eduardo	TV series
2011	The Perfect Student	Jake	
2011	CSI: Miami	Scott Pendleton	TV series
2011	Single Ladies	Aaron Spector	TV series
2012	Hemingway	Mitchell Hemmingway	
2013	Lovestruck: The Musical	Marco Vitturi	TV movie
2015	Forever	Zach	
2016	Good Girls Revolt	Noah Binowitz	TV series
2016	Lights Out	Bret	
2019	Pose	Andre Taglioni	3 episodes
