= Sidney Franklin (actor, born 1990) =

American actor

- Born: Sidney Franklin Buehner; January 15, 1990 (age 36); San Diego, California, U.S.
- Other names: Sidney Buehner
- Occupations: Actor; tap dancer; film director
- Notable credits: Excision; Legally Blonde; Thoroughly Modern Millie; Watch Over Me
- Website: sidneyfranklin.com

Sidney Franklin Buehner (born January 15, 1990) is an American actor, tap dancer, and film director who appeared in the series Watch Over Me (2006–2007), the film Excision (2012), a production of Legally Blonde (2025), and multiple productions at La Jolla Playhouse.

== Personal life ==
Franklin was born on January 15, 1990 in San Diego, California. In 2008, he lived in College Area, San Diego.

== Career ==
In the late 2000s, Franklin starred in Watch Over Me. In 2012, he was cast in Excision and Stalked at 17 by Lifetime. In 2014, Franklin was a tap dance choreographer for San Diego Dance Theater and a member of Ballet 360. He was part of the 2023 SAG-AFTRA strike at San Diego Comic-Con. In 2025, he starred in a production of Legally Blonde and was cast in You Fired a Tech Genius by ReelShort.

== Stage credits ==
Year	Title	Role	Location	Notes
2001	Our Town		La Jolla Playhouse, La Jolla, California	
2007	Torch Song		Diversionary Theatre, San Diego, California	
2013	The Family Table	Son	Lyceum Theatre, San Diego Repertory Theatre	
2013	Entrances & Exits		Salvation Army Kroc Community Center, San Diego, California	Performed 5 of 9 dances, presented by Grossmont College
2014	On the Corner of Rhythm & Rhyme		San Diego International Fringe Festival	"The Best is yet to Come" duet
2014	Chasing the Song		La Jolla Playhouse, La Jolla, California	By Joe DiPietro and David Bryan
2014	Sweat: Hot Dances for a Hot Night		Whitebox Theater, San Diego, California	"Shy Boy" choreographer
2015	Thoroughly Modern Millie	Jimmy	Coronado Playhouse, Coronado, California	Featuring Patrick Mayuyu
2015	#GameOn		Ion Theatre Company, BLKBOX Theatre	
2025	Legally Blonde	Emmett	GraceArtsLIVE theater, Lake Havasu City, Arizona	

== Filmography ==
Year	Title	Role	Notes
2000	Manhattan, AZ	Young Daniel Henderson	Uncredited, Episode: "Jake's Daughter"
2002	The Chronicle	Boyscout	Uncredited
2004	Andrew's Altercation	Andrew	Also director and producer, short film with Emily Ratajkowski
2004	Undercover Kids	Tony Premo	
2006–2007	Watch Over Me	Nicholas	10 episodes
2008	The Ex List	Dylan	Episode: "Protect and Serve"
2009	Flying By	Young WIlly	
2010	Sons of Anarchy	Buddy	Episode: "Widening Gyre"
2011	Hank	Teenage Boy	Episode: "Hank's Got a Friend"
2012	Excision	Timothy	
2012	Stalked at 17	Trent	Lifetime
2013	This Magic Moment	Customer #1	Hallmark Channel
2014–2016	Faking it	Brad / Pierced Punk Kid	4 episodes
2017	The Cast Members	Dan Radney	Pilot, featuring Jon Allen, Merrick McCartha, Mark Atkinson
2019	The Flourish	Top Hat Tom	Short film
2022	Some Like it Hot	Sidney	
2025	You Fired a Tech Genius	Eric Martin	ReelShort series
