= Lights Out (2016 film) =

Film by David F. Sandberg

- Theatrical release poster
- Directed by: David F. Sandberg
- Screenplay by: Eric Heisserer
- Based on: Lights Out by David F. Sandberg
- Produced by: James Wan; Lawrence Grey; Eric Heisserer
- Starring: Teresa Palmer; Gabriel Bateman; Alexander DiPersia; Billy Burke; Maria Bello
- Cinematography: Marc Spicer
- Edited by: Kirk Morri; Michel Aller
- Music by: Benjamin Wallfisch
- Production companies: New Line Cinema; RatPac-Dune Entertainment; Atomic Monster; Grey Matter Productions
- Distributed by: Warner Bros. Pictures
- Release dates: June 8, 2016 (Los Angeles Film Festival); July 22, 2016 (United States)
- Running time: 81 minutes
- Country: United States
- Language: English
- Budget: $4.9 million
- Box office: $148.9 million

Lights Out is a 2016 American supernatural horror film directed by David F. Sandberg (in his directorial debut) and written by Eric Heisserer, who based the screenplay on Sandberg's 2013 short film of the same name. It follows a woman who must protect her young half-brother against a spirit from her family's past that kills its victims in the dark. The film stars Teresa Palmer, Gabriel Bateman, Alexander DiPersia, Billy Burke, and Maria Bello. It also features Sandberg's wife Lotta Losten, who starred in the short film.

Produced by Heisserer, Lawrence Grey, and James Wan, the film was shot in Los Angeles from June to August 2015. It had its world premiere at the Los Angeles Film Festival on June 8, 2016, and was released in the United States and Canada by Warner Bros. Pictures on July 22, 2016. The film grossed $148 million against a budget of $4.9 million and received positive reviews from critics. A sequel is in development.

== Plot ==
During closing hours at a textile factory, an employee named Esther says goodbye to her boss, Paul. On her way out, she encounters the silhouette of a strange woman with claw-like hands. The figure disappears when the lights are turned on and reappears when they are turned off. After Esther leaves, Paul encounters the woman as well. He attempts to escape and locks himself inside an office, but the woman kills him after the lights go out.

Some time later, Paul's son, Martin, witnesses his mother, Sophie, talking to something in the dark. Sophie notices him and comforts him, but as he returns to bed, Martin sees a strange figure lurking in the shadows behind her. Terrified, he locks himself in his bedroom. Shortly afterward, Martin begins struggling to stay awake at school. When the school nurse cannot reach Sophie, Rebecca, Sophie's daughter from a previous relationship and Martin's half-sister, is called to the nurse's office. A Child Protective Services agent questions Rebecca about Martin's living conditions, and she reveals that Sophie takes antidepressants.

Martin tells Rebecca that their mother has been talking to a woman named Diana. Rebecca assures him that Diana is not real, explaining that she also heard Sophie talking to the imaginary girl when she was a child. When she and Martin arrive at Sophie's house, Rebecca argues with her mother after discovering that Sophie has stopped taking her medication. Sophie insists that Rebecca has no right to lecture her and accuses her of abandoning her, just as Rebecca's father did. Doubting her mother's mental stability, Rebecca takes Martin to her apartment, leaving Sophie devastated. That night, Rebecca awakens to find the same shadowy woman who killed Paul. She narrowly escapes an attack by turning on the lights, causing the woman to disappear. The following morning, Rebecca discovers that the name "Diana" has been scratched into her floor alongside a drawing of a stick figure. Recognizing the same name and drawing from her childhood, she realizes that Diana is real.

Rebecca searches Paul's office and discovers medical records and research revealing that Sophie was admitted to a mental hospital as a child. There, she befriended Diana, a young patient with a severe skin condition that prevented her from being exposed to sunlight. Diana was believed to possess the ability to influence people's minds, and her father had died by suicide after allegedly being manipulated by her. Eventually, hospital staff attempted to treat Diana using an experimental procedure involving intense light, accidentally reducing her to ashes. Meanwhile, a CPS agent takes Martin back to Sophie. Sophie speaks with her son and decides to let him meet Diana by turning off the lights. Frightened by the apparition, Martin flees to Rebecca's apartment.

Rebecca, her boyfriend Bret, and Martin stage an intervention to confront Sophie about Diana's influence over the family. Although Sophie becomes angry, she secretly begs Rebecca for help, admitting that Diana will not let her go. The group decides to stay overnight at Sophie's house, planning to seek professional help the following morning. To protect themselves, they illuminate the house as brightly as possible. However, Diana cuts the power throughout the neighborhood, rendering their precautions useless. She traps Rebecca and Martin in the basement and attacks Bret. Despite his injuries, Bret escapes by using his car's headlights to keep Diana at bay before driving away. Later, Sophie confronts Diana and begs her to spare her children, but Diana knocks her unconscious when she attempts to take her medication. In the basement, Rebecca and Martin find a blacklight that allows Rebecca to see Diana clearly, although its illumination proves insufficient to repel her.

Bret returns with two police officers. After freeing Rebecca and Martin, the officers spot Diana's shadow and pursue her, but she kills them. Rebecca and Martin escape the house, but Martin insists that they cannot leave Sophie behind. Rebecca returns alone to rescue her mother. As Rebecca climbs the stairs, Diana reveals that she killed Rebecca's father years earlier because he, like Paul, tried to help Sophie recover from her trauma. Diana attacks Rebecca for attempting to do the same and prepares to kill her. However, Sophie regains consciousness, takes a gun from one of the dead officers, and shoots at Diana. When the bullets have no effect, Sophie realizes that she is the link allowing Diana to exist in the real world. Determined to save her children, Sophie turns the gun on herself and dies by suicide, causing Diana to vanish.

After the terrifying night, Bret comforts Rebecca and Martin in an ambulance outside the house. When a light inside the ambulance flickers, the siblings grow uneasy, but Bret reassures them that Diana is truly gone.

== Cast ==
- Teresa Palmer as Rebecca
  - Amiah Miller as young Rebecca
- Gabriel Bateman as Martin, Rebecca's half-brother
- Alexander DiPersia as Bret, Rebecca's boyfriend
- Billy Burke as Paul, Rebecca's step-father
- Maria Bello as Sophie, Rebecca and Martin's mother
  - Emily Alyn Lind as teen Sophie
- Alicia Vela-Bailey as Diana, a malevolent spirit and Sophie's friend
  - Ava Cantrell as teen Diana
- Andi Osho as Emma, a social worker
- Rolando Boyce as Brian Andrews
- Maria Russell as Officer Gomez
- Elizabeth Pan as Nurse
- Lotta Losten as Esther, Paul's assistant

== Production ==
=== Development ===
Sandberg, along with his wife Lotta Losten, created the initial short film for a film competition. Although the film did not win the competition, the short soon went viral, leading to Sandberg being contacted by several agents, to the point where he had to develop a spreadsheet to keep track of them all. One of the contacts was Lawrence Grey who wanted to collaborate with James Wan in order to produce a feature-length version. Although Wan enjoyed the short, he was hesitant that it could be turned into a feature until Sandberg produced a treatment for the feature-length version.

The move to Hollywood was somewhat hectic for the couple, requiring that Losten quit her day job in order to do so. Once in Hollywood the two were unable to get an apartment due to not having a US credit score, forcing them to rent Airbnb on a monthly basis.

Sandberg originally based the character of Rebecca on a real girl that he knew who was suffering from depression, and who was engaging in self-harm, which is why Rebecca has scars on her arms, but the development of the film made it less about depression and more of a ghost story in which Diana would have been the real person who died and became a ghost. Wan came up with the idea of making Diana the ghost. Rebecca's boyfriend was also given a twist of being a rocker, but is actually committed and responsible, even driving a safe car like a Volvo. Another twist Sandberg liked was making the imaginary friend for the mother rather than the trope of having the friend be for the child.

=== Casting ===
In June 2015, Gabriel Bateman and Teresa Palmer were cast in the film as the child and teenager leads. In that same month, Maria Bello was cast in the film as the mother of Bateman and Palmer's characters, alongside Alexander DiPersia as the boyfriend of Palmer's character, Billy Burke as the stepfather of Palmer's character and father of Bateman's character, and Alicia Vela-Bailey as the main antagonist Diana were also starring.

=== Filming ===
Principal photography for the film began in June 2015 in Los Angeles. Filming was completed on August 5, 2015. Sandberg had not worked with a film crew or visited a film set before directing Lights Out; he had to ask the first assistant director, "So when do I say action?"

=== Special effects ===
Special effects of having the ghost appear and disappear were mostly done by using a split-screen technique as also used in the short. Sandberg said "Whenever she's in frame with another character, it's basically just a split screen. So you shoot it with her and without her. You turn the camera on with her, you turn it off and she walks off, and then you turn it on again. It's super simple, actually." Sandberg also made a list of what he called the "light gags", or different ways to create light sources from flashlights to cell phones and gunfire. In the scene when Diana appears in Rebecca's room, James Wan suggested replacing passing car headlights in an early treatment with the flashing neon sign that appears in the final film.

=== Ending Concerns ===
After hearing concerns from critics that the ending of the film was promoting suicide, Sandberg interviewed with The A.V. Club where he said he was distressed about that idea, and wanted to explain his position. He said that he originally wanted to make a film about depression, as he has also suffered from it, and that one of his friends had died by suicide. Diana was not a ghost back then, but during the development of the film, it became more of a horror film. It still retained some themes about depression and mental illness. He had originally shot a second ending to the film in which Martin becomes depressed and Diana comes back one more time before she is killed. Test audiences concluded that Sophie's sacrifice would have been in vain.

== Release ==
The film had its world premiere at the Los Angeles Film Festival on June 8, 2016. The film also screened at Comic-Con on July 20, 2016, and was released on July 22, 2016.

== Reception ==
=== Box office ===
Lights Out grossed $67.3 million in the United States and Canada and $81.6 million in other territories for a worldwide total of $148.9 million, against a production budget of $4.9 million.

In North America, Lights Out was projected to gross $13–15 million from 2,900 theaters in its opening weekend. It made $1.8 million from its Thursday night screenings and $9.2 million on its first day. The film exceeded expectations and earned $21.7 million in its opening weekend, finishing at third place behind fellow newcomer Star Trek Beyond and holdover The Secret Life of Pets.

In other territories, the film earned $8.5 million in its opening weekend from 3,737 screens in key markets of Russia and Australia along with 30 smaller Eastern European and Asian markets. The film benefited from being released in the wake of the global success of The Conjuring 2. It debuted at first place in Russia with $1.7 million. Its other top openings were recorded in South Korea ($3.9 million), France ($1.5 million), the U.K. ($1.4 million) and Spain ($1.1 million). Its biggest earning markets are South Korea ($7.7 million), Mexico ($5.5 million), the U.K. ($4.5 million) and Spain ($3.9 million).

=== Critical response ===
On review aggregator Rotten Tomatoes the film has an approval rating of 75% based on 183 reviews, with a weighted average rating of 6.3/10. The site's critical consensus reads, "Lights Out makes skillful use of sturdy genre tropes—and some terrific performances—for an unsettling, fright-filled experience that delivers superior chills without skimping on story." On Metacritic, the film has a score of 58 out of 100, based on 34 critics, indicating "mixed or average" reviews. Audiences polled by CinemaScore gave the film an average grade of "B" on an A+ to F scale.

Lucy O'Brien of IGN gave the film 7/10, saying: "[w]ith an unnerving monster at its core, great cast and relentless final sequence, Light's [sic] Out is a debut director Sandberg should be proud of. A clunky script occasionally loosens its grip on the nerves, but chances are Diana will still have you sleeping with the lights on for a good while after leaving the theatre." Richard Roeper of the Chicago Sun-Times awarded the film 4 stars out of 4, stating: "[e]ven the most cynical, jaded, seen-it-all-before critic cannot deny certain visceral reactions to a film. Lights Out gave me the chills." Justin Lowe of The Hollywood Reporter wrote, "[a] surprisingly maternal horror movie that relies as much on fraying emotional bonds as supernatural suspense to create tension, Lights Out deals with an array of primal fears that threaten to unravel a family's fundamental relationships, along with their sanity." Jeannette Catsoulis of The New York Times wrote, "[s]packling over any copycat cracks with strong acting and fleet editing, Lights Out delivers minimalist frights in old-school ways."

A few critics were less taken with the film. James Berardinelli of Reelviews gave 2 stars out of 4, saying: "[u]nfortunately, the film stumbles, offering too few legitimate scares and displaying an overreliance on traditional horror movie clichés." Berardinelli detested the film's camerawork, described characters as being "thinly drawn", and the screenplay as "spending inordinate amount of time providing a backstory..." Rex Reed of Observer gave 1 star out of 4, saying: "the film's screenplay focuses almost entirely on the number of resourceful and ingenious ways the characters dream up to keep the lights on, stave off the next attack and stay alive—lights from candles, flashlights, cellphones, the car in the driveway—before the batteries die; The fun wears out fast and so does the "gotcha" factor."

=== Accolades ===
| Award | Category | Subject | Result |
|---|---|---|---|
| Fright Meter Award | Best Special Effects | Lights Out | Nominated |
| Palm Springs International Film Festival | Directors to Watch | David F. Sandberg | Won |

== Sequel ==
In July 2016, a week after the film's release, it was announced that New Line Cinema and Warner Bros. Pictures had greenlit a sequel. Heisserer and Sandberg will return to write and direct the film, respectively, while Wan and Lawrence Grey will return to produce under their Atomic Monster and Grey Matter Productions banners.

In March 2026, it was announced that the sequel had re-entered development with Connor O. McIntyre writing the film with Heisserer and Sandberg now serving as producers.

== See also ==
- List of ghost films
