= Viorst =

Viorst is a surname. Notable people with the surname include:

- Judith Viorst (born 1931), American writer and journalist
- Milton Viorst (1930–2022), American journalist
