= Isaiah Russell-Bailey =

American actor (born 2006)

- Born: December 9, 2006 (age 19); Fort Worth, Texas, U.S.
- Occupations: Actor; Model; Dancer
- Years active: 2018–present
- Known for: Family Reunion; Raven's Home; Criminal Minds

Isaiah Russell-Bailey (born December 9, 2006) is an American actor, model, social media personality and dancer. He is known for portraying Shaka McKellan in the Netflix sitcom Family Reunion (2019–2022) and Burton in the Disney Channel series Raven's Home (2020–2023).

He has also acted in Criminal Minds (2017), S.W.A.T. (2017), Throwback Holiday (2018), Family Reunion (2019), We Can Be Heroes (2020) and Crater (2023).

== Early life and education ==
Isaiah Russell-Bailey was born on December 9, 2006, in Fort Worth, Texas. He grew up in Los Angeles, California and was introduced to the performing arts at an early age and trained in dance before pursuing acting.

== Career ==
Russell-Bailey began acting in 2018, appearing in the television series Criminal Minds, Giants, Raven's Home, and S.W.A.T.. He also acted in the television film Throwback Holiday that year.

In 2019, he was cast as Shaka McKellan in the Netflix comedy series Family Reunion, where he stars alongside Tia Mowry, Loretta Devine, Anthony Alabi, and Richard Roundtree. He reprised the role in the TV film A Family Reunion Christmas (2019) and the crossover special Game On! A Comedy Crossover Event (2020).

Bailey played the superhero Rewind in the Robert Rodriguez Netflix film We Can Be Heroes in 2020. In 2023, he was cast in a lead film role as Caleb Channing in Disney+'s science fiction adventure film Crater, directed by Kyle Patrick Alvarez.

== Filmography ==
=== Film ===
Year	Title	Role	Notes
2018	Throwback Holiday	Justin Grant	Television film
2019	A Family Reunion Christmas	Shaka McKellan	Television film
2020	We Can Be Heroes	Rewind	
2023	Crater	Caleb Channing	
2024	Dilemma in the Alley	Black	Short film

=== Television ===
Year	Title	Role	Notes
2018	Criminal Minds	Young Kevon Winters	Episode: "Miasma"
2018	Giants	Young Malachi	2 episodes
2018	Raven's Home	Burton	Episode: "Weirder Things"
2018	S.W.A.T.	Dee	Episode: "Hoax"
2019	Family Reunion	Shaka McKellan	Main role (2019–2021)
2020	Game On! A Comedy Crossover Event	Shaka McKellan	Episode: "Family Reunion: Remember the Family's Feud?"
2021	Super Wings	Rover (voice)	Episode: "Golden Boy"
