= Alexander and the Terrible, Horrible, No Good, Very Bad Road Trip =

2025 film by Marvin Lemus

- Release poster
- Directed by: Marvin Lemus
- Written by: Matt Lopez
- Based on: Alexander and the Terrible, Horrible, No Good, Very Bad Day by Judith Viorst
- Produced by: Shawn Levy; Dan Levine; Dan Cohen; Lisa Henson
- Starring: Eva Longoria; Jesse Garcia; Paulina Chávez; Rose Portillo; Thom Nemer; Cheech Marin
- Cinematography: Jas Shelton
- Edited by: Michael Giambra
- Music by: Camilo Lara
- Production companies: Walt Disney Pictures; The Jim Henson Company; 21 Laps Entertainment
- Distributed by: Disney+
- Release date: March 28, 2025
- Running time: 94 minutes
- Country: United States
- Language: English

Alexander and the Terrible, Horrible, No Good, Very Bad Road Trip is a 2025 American family road comedy film directed by Marvin Lemus and written by Matt Lopez. It is a reboot to the 2014 film Alexander and the Terrible, Horrible, No Good, Very Bad Day, which was based on the children's book of the same name by Judith Viorst. It stars Eva Longoria, Jesse Garcia, Paulina Chávez, Rose Portillo, Thom Nemer, and Cheech Marin.

In December 2020, Disney hired Lopez to write a follow-up to Alexander and the Terrible, Horrible, No Good, Very Bad Day for Disney+. It follows a similar plot, but focuses on a "multigenerational Latino family". 21 Laps Entertainment and The Jim Henson Company returned to produce the film. In October 2022, Marvin Lemus signed on to direct while Eva Longoria was cast as Val. It features the family going on a road trip. By March 2024, the title was changed to Alexander and the Terrible, Horrible, No Good, Very Bad Road Trip.

The film was released exclusively on Disney+ on March 28, 2025.

== Plot ==
Alexander Garcia is convinced that his family is cursed due to the constant accident-prone incidents that he may or may not have caused. He lives with his older sister, Mia, who is waiting to get asked to the prom, his mother, Val, who is a travel journalist, his father, Frank, whose restaurant is getting shut down (unbeknownst to the family), and his grandmother and Frank's mother, Lidia. They are visited by Val's father, Gil, who has come to watch over their dog, Clyde, while they go on a road trip paid for by Val's magazine. While rummaging through the attic, Alexander finds an old Mexican idol. Gil reveals that his grandfather, Alejandro, was gifted it by brujas to help him become wealthy through his farm. Because he didn't return it, a fire broke out that burned the town of Soledad down. Frank resolves to toss it away to put Alexander's mind at ease.

The next day, the family embarks on their trip via a large green state-of-the-art travel RV. Things seem fine at first until Alexander spills soda onto one of the mechanisms. Panicking, he tries to fix it at the main controls, only to cause the RV to go haywire. It crashes into a large alien statue that damages the front of it. Gil, who was talking to Val on the phone, hears the commotion and resolves to leave Clyde with neighbors while he goes after his family. The family is forced to stop at a car rental agency next to a botánica. Alexander and Mia find that the idol has been packed along with their things and take it to the owner, Claudio, who confirms that it is cursed and that they need to take it back to Soledad.

The family rents a rundown travel van where they encounter the next problem: a wild skunk that sprays everyone. They escape and let it out before making an emergency stop at a gas station. They get a change of clothes and leave, but realize that they forgot Lidia who stopped to get a popsicle. They turn around to get her but are sidetracked by a herd of cows, forcing them to go off-road. They happen upon a "ravine", but the van gets caught in it and is washed away, forcing them to swim to land, but leave the idol behind. Frank and Val get into an argument where Alexander reveals that Frank is losing the restaurant and that they constantly ignore him and his warnings. They soon encounter a woman named Lupe, whom only Alexander can speak to in Spanish, who takes them back home to her husband, Chavo, revealing to them that they are in Mexico.

After encountering Claudio and learning of his family's whereabouts, Gil runs into a stranded Lidia and rescues her, though they bicker about their respective views of Mexican culture. While taking a break, Gil reveals that he has never actually been to Mexico because he was unable to get a passport at the time. By then, his grandmother had passed and he has regretted it ever since. He and Lidia become closer.

Chavo and Lupe give the family a rundown ice cream truck which they use to continue their journey. While digging through the back, Mia and Alexander discover the idol. The ice cream truck rolls down a hill, lands in a ditch, and explodes, leaving the idol unharmed. Now totally convinced of its power, the family resolve to return it after seeing a sign showing that Soledad is nearby. They arrive and are reunited with Gil and Lidia before coming to a museum. They learn from the mayor and curators (who resemble the brujas) that a fire did burn Soledad down, but in the process the people found water. Not only that, but the town already has the real idol, and the one that the family had this whole time was a prop. Alexander is upset over the fact that their journey was for nothing, but Frank and Val tell him that bad days happen all the time and due to his preparedness, they are still alive.

The family happily decides to celebrate together in Soledad and embrace their future together. Gil and Lidia's relationship improves, Mia calls the boy she likes and asks him to the prom, and Val reveals that she knows what her new book, which she previously mentioned that she wanted to write, will be about.

== Cast ==
- Eva Longoria as Val Garcia, Alexander's mother
- Cheech Marin as Gil Morales, Val's father and Alexander's maternal grandfather
- Thom Nemer as Alexander Garcia
- Jesse Garcia as Frank Garcia, Alexander's father
- Paulina Chávez as Mia Garcia, Alexander's older sister
- Rose Portillo as Lidia Garcia, Frank's mother and Alexander's paternal grandmother
- Tiffany Vi as Cassie
- Alexander Alayon Jr. as Alejandro Morales, Gil's paternal grandfather and Alexander's maternal great-great-grandfather
- Michelle Buteau as Missy McGill
- Carl Severing as Joel, a neighbor
- Angela Wilson as Cassandra, a neighbor
- Harvey Guillén as Claudio
- Mabel Cadena as Lupe, Chavo's wife
- Cristo Fernández as Chavo, Lupe's husband
- Jacqueline Torres as Menéndez, the mayor

== Production ==
In December 2020, a follow up to Alexander and the Terrible, Horrible, No Good, Very Bad Day was announced to be in early development for Disney+ with Matt Lopez writing the script. It would follow a similar plot applied to a "multi-generational Latinx family". 21 Laps Entertainment and The Jim Henson Company are also set to return. On October 4, 2022, Marvin Lemus was chosen as the director, while Eva Longoria and George Lopez were cast as Frank and Val. In February 2023, Jesse Garcia joined the cast. In March, Thom Nemer was cast in the lead role as Alexander. The same month, Paulina Chávez and Rose Portillo joined the cast. In April, George Lopez was replaced by Cheech Marin due to scheduling conflicts. The same month, Cristo Fernández and Harvey Guillén joined the cast.

Production began in April 2023 in New Mexico. By March 2024, the film's title had changed to Alexander and the Terrible, Horrible, No Good, Very Bad Road Trip.

== Release ==
The film was released on Disney+ on March 28, 2025.

== Reception ==
On the review aggregator website Rotten Tomatoes, 58% of 12 critics' reviews are positive, with an average rating of 5.8/10.

Jennifer Green of Common Sense Media gave the film three stars and wrote that the characters are likeable and that it is reminiscent of films such as National Lampoon's Vacation, but criticized the comedic timing of it.

Daniel Howat of Next Best Picture gave the film a five out of ten, praising the performances and plot premise, but criticized it for being formulaic.
