= Game On: A Comedy Crossover Event =

- Genre: Comedy; Family
- Starring: Paul Wight; Allison Munn; Reylynn Caster; Lily Brooks O'Briant; Juliet Donenfeld; Gabriel "Fluffy" Iglesias; Eva Longoria; Sherri Shepherd; Jacob Vargas; Maggie Geha; Cree Cicchino; Fabrizio Guido; Tucker Albrizzi; Paulina Chávez; Conor Husting; Bella Podaras; Reed Horstmann; Jencarlos Canela; Tia Mowry; Anthony Alabi; Talia Jackson; Isaiah Russell-Bailey; Cameron J. Wright; Jordyn Raya James; Loretta Devine; Luenell
- Music by: Chris Alan Lee; Joseph LoDuca; Danny Lux; Michael Reola; Wendell Hanes
- Country of origin: United States
- Original language: English
- No. of seasons: 1
- No. of episodes: 4

Production
- Executive producers: Josh Bycel; Jason Berger; Susan Levison; Richard Lowell; Kevin Hench; Gabriel Iglesias; Peter Murrieta; Ron DeBlasio; Joe Meloche; Seth Kurland; Mario Lopez; David Kendall; Mark Schulman; Meg DeLoatch
- Producers: Pixie Wespiser; Chris Arrington; Isaac Gonzalez; Philippe Iujvidin; Patty Gary-Cox; Scott Hartle
- Cinematography: Joe Pennella; Peter Smokler; John Simmons
- Editors: Chris Harvey; Scott Hill; Stephen Prime; Russell Griffin
- Running time: 27–30 minutes

Original release
- Network: Netflix
- Release: August 10, 2020

Game On: A Comedy Crossover Event is an American comedy television series which unites the casts of four of its family sitcoms for a comedy event which are The Big Show Show, Mr. Iglesias, The Expanding Universe of Ashley Garcia, and Family Reunion.

It was a crossover from four other Netflix shows

== Cast ==
- Paul Wight as himself
- Allison Munn as Cassy Wight
- Reylynn Caster as Lola Wight
- Lily Brooks O'Briant as Mandy Wight
- Juliet Donenfeld as J.J. Wight
- Gabriel "Fluffy" Iglesias as Gabe Iglesias
- Sherri Shepherd as Paula Madison
- Jacob Vargas as Tony Ochoa
- Maggie Geha as Abby Spencer
- Cree Cicchino as Marisol Fuentes
- Fabrizio Guido as Mikey Gutierrez
- Tucker Albrizzi as Walt
- Paulina Chávez as Ashley Garcia
- Conor Husting as Tad Cameron
- Bella Podaras as Brooke Bishop
- Reed Horstmann as Stick Goldstein
- Jencarlos Canela as Victor Garcia
- Tia Mowry as Cocoa McKellan
- Anthony Alabi as Moz McKellan
- Talia Jackson as Jade McKellan
- Isaiah Russell-Bailey as Shaka McKellan
- Cameron J. Wright as Mazzi McKellan
- Jordyn Raya James as Ami McKellan
- Loretta Devine as M'Dear
- Luenell as Peaches

== Episodes ==
No.	Title	Directed by	Written by	Original release date
1	"The Big Show Show: The Big Games"	Melissa Joan Hart	Rebecca Delgado Smith & Jessica Elaina Eason	August 10, 2020
The Big Show and his daughters do their best to help Cassy triumph over an arch-frenemy in a series of seriously silly family vs. family games.
2	"Mr. Iglesias: Olympic Effort"	Victor Gonzalez	Kevin Hench	August 10, 2020
Inspired by the Olympics, Mr. Iglesias teaches his class about privilege — and the importance of playing by the rules — during an SAT prep class.
3	"Ashley Garcia: Pasadena 2020"	Kelly Park	Conor Hanney & Kevin Hanney Jr.	August 10, 2020
Tensions mount as Tío Victor fights to reclaim his burrito recipe from a cross-town rival. Can a series of Coffee House Games put an end to the drama? Special guest star: Eva Longoria as Gia
4	"Family Reunion: Remember the Family's Feud"	Kelly Park	Adrienne Carter	August 10, 2020
The competition between the McKellans and their longtime rivals, the McCoys, heats up at the Columbus Country Games ... until the grandbabies go missing.

== Release ==
Game On: A Comedy Crossover Event was released on August 10, 2020 on Netflix.
