= Paulina Chávez =

American actress (born 2002)

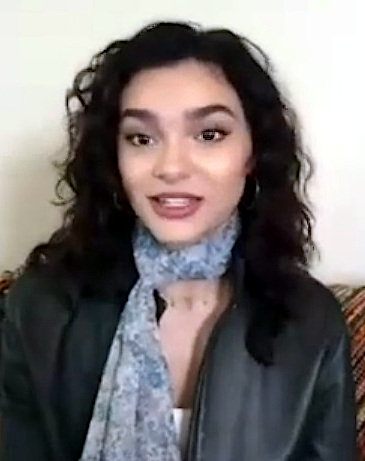
- Chávez in 2024
- Born: May 22, 2002 (age 24); El Paso, Texas, U.S.
- Occupation: Actress
- Years active: 2016–present

Paulina F. Chávez (born May 22, 2002) is an American actress. She is notable for her roles in the Netflix series The Expanding Universe of Ashley Garcia (2020) and as Flora in the second season of the Netflix series Fate: The Winx Saga (2022). In 2024, Chávez starred in the Nickelodeon film The Casagrandes Movie and in the Paramount+ series Landman, portraying Ariana in a recurring role.

== Early life ==
She was born on May 22, 2002, in El Paso, Texas, and raised in San Antonio. Her parents are from Mexico with her family originating from Ciudad Juárez. At the age of seven, she enrolled in drama classes at her elementary school in San Antonio where her mother worked. She was later enrolled in lessons with acting coach Cathryn Sullivan.

== Career ==
Chávez began her career at a young age, having roles in her local theatre and appearing in several television commercials at a young age. In 2016, she appeared in various short films and independent films. She had a minor role as Carmen in the television series Day 5 in 2016. In 2018, she portrayed a young Kim Kardashian in the series Scandal Made Me Famous.

In 2020, Chávez had her breakthrough role as Ashley Garcia, the main role, in the Netflix series The Expanding Universe of Ashley Garcia. She also appeared in the series special Game On: A Comedy Crossover Event. The series was cancelled after one season. However she appeared in the series's Christmas special in December of that year. In 2022, she appeared as Flora, a main role, in the second season Netflix's Fate: The Winx Saga. For her roles in The Expanding Universe of Ashley Garcia and Fate: The Winx Saga, Chávez was nominated for the Imagen Award for Best Young Actor.

In March 2023, it was announced that she would portray Mia Garcia in Alexander and the Terrible, Horrible, No Good, Very Bad Road Trip, a Disney+ reboot of Alexander and the Terrible, Horrible, No Good, Very Bad Day. That same year, she appeared in The Long Game as Daniela Torres. In 2024, she had a role in Nickelodeon film The Casagrandes Movie as Punguari and Shara. That same year, she appeared in a recurring role in the Paramount+ series Landman, portraying Ariana alongside Billy Bob Thornton and Demi Moore.

== Filmography ==
=== Film ===
Year	Title	Role	Notes	Ref
2019	Li'l Mayne and the Knuckleheads	Angel		
2019	Teenage Girl: Valerie's Holiday	Freda		
2023	The Long Game	Daniela Torres		
2024	The Casagrandes Movie	Punguari/Shara	Voice role	
2025	Alexander and the Terrible, Horrible, No Good, Very Bad Road Trip	Mia Garcia		
2026	Vampire Carnival	Olivia		

=== Television ===
Year	Title	Role	Notes	Ref
2016	Day 5	Carmen	1 episode	
2018	Scandal Made Me Famous	Kim Kardashian (young)	1 episode	
2019	Padre Pio	Isabella	3 episodes	
2020	Game On: A Comedy Crossover Event	Ashley Garcia	2 episodes	
2020	The Expanding Universe of Ashley Garcia	Ashley Garcia	Main role	
2020	Feliz NaviDAD	Noel	Television film	
2022	Fate: The Winx Saga	Flora	Main role	
2024–present	Landman	Ariana	Main role	

== Awards and nominations ==
Year	Award	Category	Work	Result	Ref
2020	Imagen Awards	Best Young Actor – Television	The Expanding Universe of Ashley Garcia	Nominated	
2021	Imagen Awards	Best Young Actor	Ashley Garcia: Genius in Love – Part 2	Nominated	
