= C.O.G. =

- Directed by: Kyle Patrick Alvarez
- Written by: Kyle Patrick Alvarez
- Based on: "C.O.G." by David Sedaris
- Produced by: Cookie Carosella; Stephen Nemeth; Kyle Patrick Alvarez; Lauren Bratman; Betsy Stahl
- Starring: Jonathan Groff; Denis O'Hare; Dean Stockwell; Casey Wilson; Troian Bellisario; Corey Stoll
- Production company: Screen Media Films
- Distributed by: Focus World
- Release dates: January 20, 2013 (Sundance); September 20, 2013 (United States)
- Running time: 88 minutes
- Country: United States
- Language: English

C.O.G. (Note: Short for Children of God) is a 2013 American comedy drama film directed and written by Kyle Patrick Alvarez and starring Jonathan Groff, Denis O'Hare, Dean Stockwell, Casey Wilson, Troian Bellisario, and Corey Stoll. Based on a David Sedaris short story from his book of collected essays, Naked, it marks the first time one of Sedaris's stories was adapted for film.

C.O.G. was filmed on location in Forest Grove, Oregon in October 2012. It premiered at the Sundance Film Festival in January 2013 and was released in theaters that September, garnering mixed-to-positive reviews from critics.

== Plot ==
David, a recent Yale graduate, decides to "go off the grid" to work at an apple farm in Oregon, hoping to gain some life experience outside of his privileged upbringing. In his new surroundings, he adopts the alias Samuel. Out of his element and failing to fit in amongst the town's migrant workers and deeply religious locals, David begins a journey that will take him deep into unfamiliar, awkward, and sometimes humorous territory as he encounters would-be benefactors and friends alike.

== Cast ==
- Jonathan Groff as David (who tells some people his name is Samuel). The character is loosely based on David Sedaris as a young man when he traveled to Oregon and took on the occupation of an apple picker.
- Denis O'Hare as Jon, a deeply religious, recovering alcoholic who takes David (Samuel) under his wing making Oregon-shaped clocks
- Casey Wilson as Martha, a kind-hearted young mother and devoted Christian who allows David (Samuel) to stay in her home.
- Dean Stockwell as Hobbs, an old farm owner who hires David (Samuel) and gets him a job in the factory.
- Dale Dickey as Debbie, David's (Samuel's) foul-mouthed assembly line co-worker in the apple factory.
- Troian Bellisario as Jennifer, David's (Samuel's) friend who unexpectedly bails on him early on.
- Corey Stoll as Curly, the friendly forklift operator at the apple factory. Curly takes a flirtatious interest in David (Samuel) that turns darker as the film progresses.

== Release ==
The film premiered at the Sundance Film Festival on January 20, 2013, where its distribution rights were bought by Focus Features and it was nominated for the Grand Jury Prize in the festival's U.S. Dramatic Competition. It went on to screen at the Seattle International Film Festival, where it won the Best New American Cinema Award. The film also opened the 2013 Outfest Film Festival on July 10, 2013.

The film was released on VOD and in theaters on September 20, 2013.

== Reception ==
On Rotten Tomatoes, C.O.G. has an approval rating of 69% based on reviews from 36 critics, with a rating average of 6.5 out of 10. The site's critical consensus reads, "C.O.G.'s plot is a bit meandering, but the characters are always compelling and the ending is richly rewarding."

Writing for RogerEbert.com, Dan Callahan praised Alvarez's direction and the casting of Groff. He wrote, "There is a perilous difference between imagining people talking and interacting on the pages of a Sedaris story and actually seeing them do so without his masterful control of his effects. Alvarez solves that problem by taking the material and making it his own, making it more conflicted and making it much more serious. People going to C.O.G. expecting a re-creation of one of Sedaris's reliably uproarious readings of his own material will be disappointed. People who approach it as a film in its own right, with its own rhythms and goals and pleasures, will be amply rewarded."

Matt Pais of the Chicago Tribune also gave a positive review, commenting "This is a film that both respects and questions faith, something rarely done without judgment", and observing that the "scenery [is] so beautiful you can practically feel the moisture on the leaves". He concluded, "The tone of this delicate drama zeroes in on a true sense of life experience without heroes or villains, only people with different limits to how far they're willing to go for someone else". Conversely, Jeannette Catsoulis of The New York Times gave a more mixed review, writing, "Despite smatterings of wit and a stable of skilled performers, C.O.G. struggles to find a consistent tone, its episodic structure veering from farcical to poignant to dangerously raw."
