= Vampire Carnival =

- Theatrical release poster
- Directed by: David Charbonier; Justin Douglas Powell
- Written by: Jason Filardi; Peter Filardi
- Produced by: Roger Corbi; David Hillary; Christian Mercuri; Dominic Rustam
- Starring: Nell Verlaque; Paulina Chávez; Eoin Macken; Jason Isaacs
- Cinematography: José Luis Bernal
- Edited by: Stephen Boyer
- Production company: Asphyxia AIE
- Distributed by: Aura Entertainment
- Release date: October 7, 2026
- Running time: 99 minutes
- Countries: Spain; United States
- Language: English

Vampire Carnival is a 2026 horror film directed by David Charbonier and Justin Douglas Powell. The film follows a grieving girl who is sent to a mysterious traveling carnival that arrived in her small town, when she discovers an underground world that feeds on despair and demands a costly price for escape.

The film was released on October 7, 2026.

== Cast ==
- Nell Verlaque as Gemma
- Jason Isaacs as Toussaint
- Kieron Moore as Eric
- Paulina Chávez as Olivia
- Corrado Martini as Ryan
- Elizabeth Sanjuán as Angela
- Cedrick Cooper as Dan Hart
- Darren Cullen as Manuel
- Pamela Field as Library Patron
- Guillermo Llaguno as Father Molina
- Eoin Macken as Michael
- Sergio Momo as Arnaud
- Alvise Rigo as Sebastian
- Rodrigo Magallón Romeo as Deputee
- Alicia Sanz as Isabelle

== Production ==
In February 2026, Nell Verlaque, Jason Isaacs, Paulina Chávez, Kieron Moore, Eoin Macken, Alicia Sanz, Cedrick Cooper, Corrado Martini, Alvise Rigo and Elisabeth Sanjuán were added to the cast of the film, under the original title Crave. The film is directed by David Charbonier and Justin Douglas Powell, with a script written by Jason and Peter Filardi. It is produced by Roger Corbi, Dominic Rustam, and Christian Mercuri, with the Filardis and Roman Viaris serving as executive producers. Asphyxia AIE is the production company of the film, with the participation of FishCorb, Westbury Road Productions and Capstone Studios. Principal photography concluded on January 31, 2026, after more than a month of filming in Navarre. In September 2026, the film was retitled Vampire Carnival.

== Release ==
Aura Entertainment released the film on October 7, 2026.

== Reception ==
On Film Threat, Rick Hong gave it a score of 8/10, and wrote, "the initial draw to the film might be Jason Isaacs (...) However, it’s the actors around him that drive the story." On The Guardian, Phill Road rated it 3/5 stars, and wrote, "it’s Twilight at the fairground as abs run wild in pointy-toothed tug of war."
