= Milton Viorst =

American journalist (1930–2022)

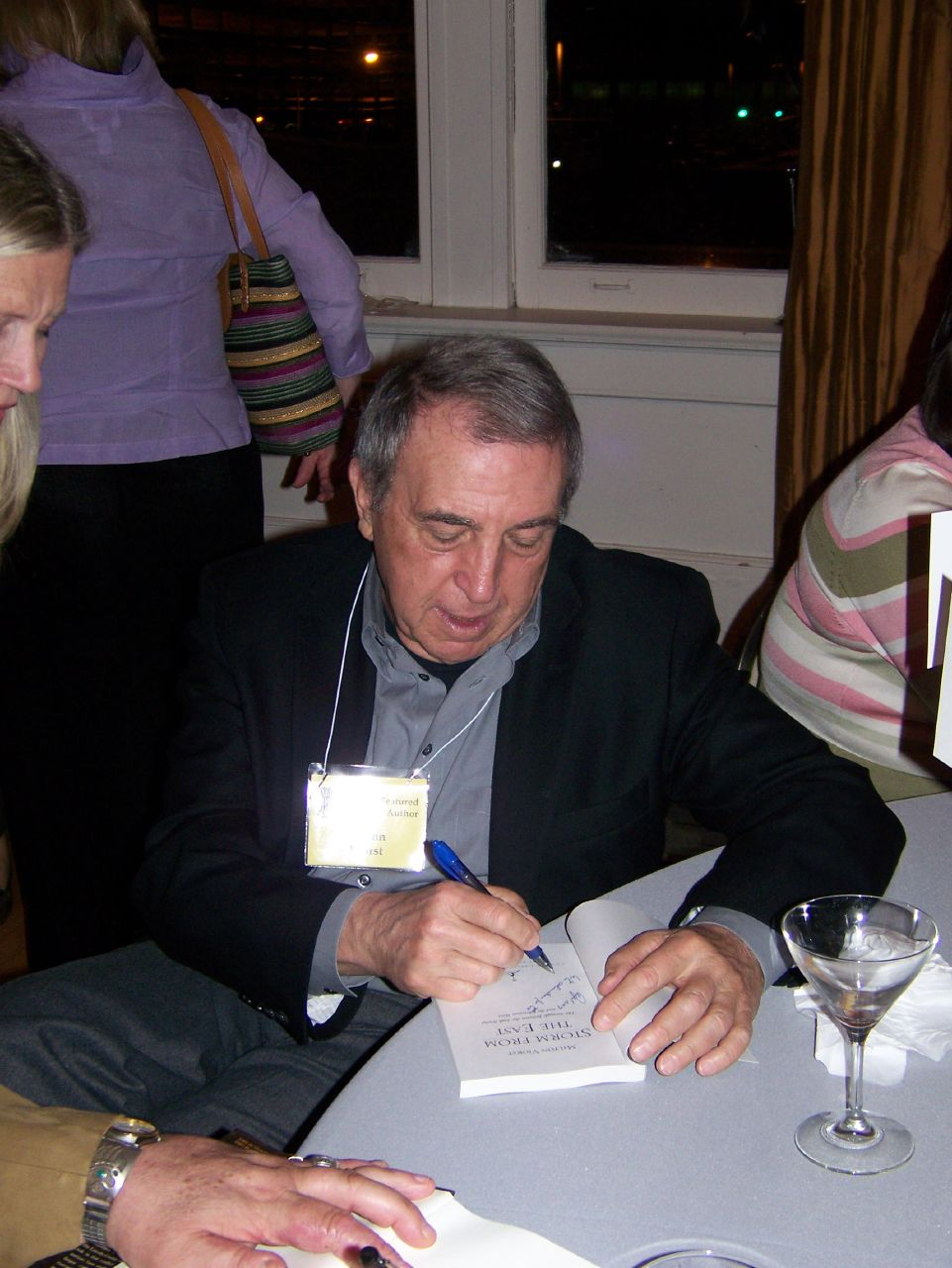
- Viorst in 2007
- Born: February 18, 1930; Paterson, New Jersey, U.S.
- Died: December 9, 2022 (aged 92); Washington, D.C., U.S.
- Education: Rutgers University; Harvard University; Columbia University
- Occupations: Journalist, writer
- Spouse: Judith Viorst
- Children: 3

Milton Viorst (February 18, 1930 – December 9, 2022) was an American journalist who wrote and reported on the Middle East, writing in a series of publications, most notably The New Yorker. He wrote ten books over the course of his career.

== Early life and education ==
Viorst was born in Paterson, New Jersey, the son of Betty (LeVine), a homemaker, and Louis Viorst, a shoe salesman. He studied history at Rutgers University. In 1951, he was a Fulbright scholar in France. Viorst returned and attended Harvard University and Columbia University, where he graduated in 1956 in journalism.

== Career ==
From 1956 to 1993, Viorst often contributed in various ways to publications such as The New Yorker, Foreign Affairs, Harper's Magazine, The Atlantic, The New York Times Magazine, the New York Post, The Washington Post, and The Wall Street Journal. In 1968, he signed the "Writers and Editors War Tax Protest" pledge, vowing to refuse tax payments in protest against the Vietnam War. His writing landed him on the master list of Nixon political opponents.

Milton Viorst won an Alicia Patterson Journalism Fellowship in 1979 to research and write about Zionist and Islamic ideas and the Mideast crisis. In the early 1980s, he grew interested in Middle Eastern policy and became a specialist in this field. He is the author of six books on the subject, including In the Shadow of The Prophet.

On October 5, 1988, Viorst wrote an op-ed in The Washington Post erroneously dispersing doubt over whether Saddam Hussein's regime had used chemical weapons in a genocide of Iraq's Kurdish population. Despite confirmation from Secretary of State George Shultz, a month earlier, that poison gas had been employed to kill thousands of civilians, including children, Viorst maintained that it "may never have taken place" and argued for Congress not to pass the Prevention of Genocide Act, which later failed. The campaign of extermination against the Kurds made for up to 100,000 casualties. Viorst was criticized for his misleading article in A Problem from Hell.

In April 2016, Viorst published Zionism: The Birth and Transformation of an Ideal with St. Martin's Press.

== Views on Israel and Palestine ==
Viorst, an American Jew, held a nuanced perspective on Israel and Palestine. He supported Israel’s existence and saw the Six-Day War as legitimizing the state and paving the way for peace with Egypt, yet he consistently advocated for a separate Palestinian state on the West Bank and encouraged Israel to negotiate with the Palestine Liberation Organization. While praised for his perceptive and balanced analysis, including by reviewers like John C. Campbell, Viorst also faced criticism from scholars such as Edward Said, who accused him of “Orientalist ignorance”.

== Personal life ==
Viorst was married to the children's author Judith Viorst, known for Alexander and the Terrible, Horrible, No Good, Very Bad Day. They had three sons. He had earlier been briefly married to novelist Marion Meade.

He died from complications of COVID-19 at a Washington, D.C., hospital on December 9, 2022, at the age of 92. He is survived by his wife, Judith; their three sons, Anthony, Nicholas, and Alexander; and their seven grandchildren.
