= Dan Levine =

American film producer

Daniel S. Levine is an American film producer.

== Career ==
Levine is best known for producing the critically acclaimed film Arrival (2016) that earned him an Academy Award for Best Picture nomination with Shawn Levy, Aaron Ryder, and David Linde.

== Filmography ==
Producer

- Camp (2003) (co-producer)
- Alexander and the Terrible, Horrible, No Good, Very Bad Day (2014)
- Arrival (2016)
- Why Him? (2016)
- Kodachrome (2017)
- The Darkest Minds (2018)
- Rosaline (2022)
- Crater (2023)
- The Boogeyman (2023)
- Never Let Go (2024)
- Alexander and the Terrible, Horrible, No Good, Very Bad Road Trip (2025)
- Backrooms (2026)
- The Catch (2027)
- Seasons (2027)
- One Attempt Remaining (TBA)

Executive producer

- Along Came Polly (2004)
- Freedom Writers (2007)
- The Watch (2012)
- The Internship (2013)
- I Am Not Okay with This (2020)
- Free Guy (2021)
- Shadow and Bone (2021-2023)
- The Adam Project (2022)
- All the Light We Cannot See (2023)
- Star Wars: Starfighter (2027)

== Awards and nominations ==
- Nominated: Academy Award for Best Picture - Arrival
- Nominated: BAFTA Award for Best Film - Arrival
- Nominated: Producers Guild of America Award for Best Theatrical Motion Picture - Arrival
