= Alexander and the Terrible, Horrible, No Good, Very Bad Day (film) =

2014 American family comedy film

- Theatrical release poster
- Directed by: Miguel Arteta
- Written by: Rob Lieber
- Based on: Alexander and the Terrible, Horrible, No Good, Very Bad Day by Judith Viorst
- Produced by: Shawn Levy; Dan Levine; Lisa Henson
- Starring: Steve Carell; Jennifer Garner; Ed Oxenbould
- Cinematography: Terry Stacey
- Edited by: Pamela Martin
- Music by: Christophe Beck
- Production companies: Walt Disney Pictures; 21 Laps Entertainment; The Jim Henson Company
- Distributed by: Walt Disney Studios; Motion Pictures
- Release dates: October 6, 2014 (El Capitan Theatre); October 10, 2014 (United States)
- Running time: 81 minutes
- Country: United States
- Language: English
- Budget: $28 million
- Box office: $101.4 million

Alexander and the Terrible, Horrible, No Good, Very Bad Day is a 2014 American comedy film directed by Miguel Arteta from a screenplay written by Rob Lieber, loosely based on Judith Viorst's 1972 children's book of the same name. It stars Steve Carell, Jennifer Garner and Ed Oxenbould and was co-produced by Shawn Levy and Lisa Henson for Walt Disney Pictures through their respective production companies, 21 Laps Entertainment and The Jim Henson Company.

The film was released in North America on October 10, 2014. It received mixed reviews from critics but was a success at the box office, grossing $101.4 million worldwide against a $28 million budget. It is one of the few films produced by The Jim Henson Company to not feature any puppets.

A reboot film titled Alexander and the Terrible, Horrible, No Good, Very Bad Road Trip was released on Disney+ on March 28, 2025 with an entirely new cast.

== Plot ==
Living in suburban Los Angeles, Alexander Cooper often feels left out by his family: baby brother Trevor; older brother Anthony; older sister Emily; and their parents, Ben and Kelly.

Anthony is trying to pass his driving test so he can drive his demanding and sharp-tongued girlfriend, Celia Rodriguez, to the junior prom; Emily is rehearsing for the title role in her school play, Peter Pan; Kelly works for a publication company and is working on a new children's book which will get her promoted to vice-president; Ben, who has been unemployed for seven months, has landed an interview for a job as a video game designer.

That morning, Alexander experiences a series of mishaps at school: accidentally setting fire to his crush Becky Gibson's notebook; her younger brother, Elliott, sends a humiliating photoshopped image of him to the whole school; and he finds out that his friends – including Becky, and even his best friend Paul – will all be attending Philip Parker's 12th birthday party, instead of his the next day, due to Philip's expensive party entertainment and popularity. When he tries to tell his family about his bad day, however, nobody is very sympathetic due to being focused on the good things happening to them. That night, he puts a candle on a homemade birthday sundae, wishing that everyone in his family could know what it's like to have a bad day (so they could relate to what he is going through).

The next morning, Alexander wakes up to find the rest of his family in chaotic disarray: Ben and Kelly have overslept; Emily has a cold from rehearsing in Kelly's car; Celia has broken up with Anthony, due to her overhearing and misinterpreting a conversation between him and Alexander the night before. Anthony also finds a giant zit on his forehead. Kelly's car is dead, due to Emily having left the light on the previous night, draining the battery. Ben has to take Trevor with him to his interview, after dropping Kelly off at work. At school, Alexander learns that Philip's birthday party has been canceled because he has come down with the chickenpox; Becky and Paul, along with all the other kids who had originally planned to attend it, will attend Alexander's instead.

Delighted, Alexander tells Ben about Philip and that Elliott had gotten busted for texting the photos of Alexander. He then excitedly asks Ben to plan a party for him. Meanwhile, Kelly is informed of an embarrassing typo in the book they are publicizing. The title is supposed to be "Jump on the Potty", but the typo has it say "Dump on the Potty" instead. She attempts to get to a public event in time to prevent Dick Van Dyke from reading it. Ben takes Trevor with him to his interview; his prospective boss, Greg, seems impressed by his credentials. However, they decide to hold another meeting, after Trevor ingests a non-toxic green highlighter. Back at school, Anthony reconciles with Celia. He jumps up in excitement, but accidentally hits a banner which is attached to two trophy cases, causing them to come crashing down, leading to him being sent to the principal and getting suspended.

Kelly arrives at the public event too late to warn Dick Van Dyke about the book's typo. He reads it, humiliating himself, shocking the audience, and almost getting Kelly arrested. Meanwhile, Ben purchases cough syrup for Emily en route to the DMV; there, Anthony's driving examiner, Ms. Suggs, cruelly tricks him into taking his eyes off the road by using reverse psychology to persuade him to answer a call from Celia. This causes him to destroy several parking meters and damage the family minivan; he consequently fails his driving test. As the entire family bemoans their collective misfortunes, Alexander cuts in and admits his birthday wish to them. He apologizes for making everyone suffer the day they've had. Ben disagrees since it is not ruined, because it isn't over yet. Right then and there, the whole family resolves to stay as positive as they can.

All of Alexander's friends turn up for his birthday party, including Becky. Emily ruins the play due to the side effects of taking too much cough syrup but improvises anyway. Anthony decides to ditch the junior prom and, despite her beauty and popularity, breaks up with Celia after she carelessly insults his family. Ben and Kelly both get phone calls, Ben learned he got the job and Kelly is told that Dick's reading of the book went viral, and that it became a bestseller. Ben and Kelly look outside and see that their kids are enjoying themselves. The family gets home with a birthday cake for Alexander, and he makes a wish for more days like this one.

== Cast ==
- Steve Carell as Ben Cooper, father of the Cooper children.
- Jennifer Garner as Kelly Cooper, mother of the Cooper children.
- Ed Oxenbould as Alexander Cooper, 3rd born of the Cooper children and the protagonist.
- Dylan Minnette as Anthony Cooper, 1st child of the Cooper children, Alexander's older brother, and Ben and Kelly's eldest son.
- Kerris Dorsey as Emily Cooper, 2nd child of the Cooper children, Alexander's older sister, and Ben and Kelly's daughter.
- Zoey & Elise Vargas as Trevor Cooper, the youngest of the Cooper children, Alexander's baby brother, and Ben and Kelly's youngest son.
- Bella Thorne as Celia Rodriguez, Anthony's mean-tempered and shallow girlfriend.
- Sidney Fullmer as Becky Gibson, Alexander's crush.
- Megan Mullally as Nina, Kelly's boss.
- Toni Trucks as Steph
- Donald Glover as Greg
- Joel Johnstone as Logan
- Jennifer Coolidge as Ms. Iracena Suggs, Anthony's driving test examiner.
- Samantha Logan as Heather
- Dick Van Dyke as himself (uncredited cameo)
- Thunder From Down Under as Themselves
- Mekai Curtis as Paul, Alexander's best friend.
- Lincoln Melcher as Phillip Parker, Alexander's classmate and Paul's former best friend.
- Mary Mouser as Audrey Gibson, Becky's older sister.
- Reese Hartwig as Elliott Gibson, Becky's younger brother and Alexander's classmate.
- Martha Hackett as Mrs. Julie Gibson, Becky's mother.
- Burn Gorman as Mr. Marc Brand
- Eric Edelstein as Mr. Steven Tonucci

== Production ==
In 2011, 20th Century Fox initially planned to make a live-action film adaptation of the book. Written by Rob Lieber, it was set to be directed by Lisa Cholodenko (who also made an earlier draft of the screenplay), and produced by Shawn Levy with Dan Levine for Levy's 21 Laps and Lisa Henson from The Jim Henson Company. Steve Carell joined in April 2012, to star as Ben. In October 2012, the project was picked up by Walt Disney Pictures after Fox was reportedly "uncomfortable with the budget". By February 2013, Cholodenko had left the project, and a month later, it was reported that Miguel Arteta was in talks with Disney to replace her.

In April 2013, Jennifer Garner was in talks to play Kelly. In June 2013, Disney set the release date for October 10, 2014, and confirmed that Carell and Garner were cast as Ben and Kelly. The same month, Disney announced the casting of Ed Oxenbould as Alexander. In July 2013, Bella Thorne was cast in the film as Celia. Joel Johnstone, Megan Mullally, and Jennifer Coolidge joined the cast a month later.

Principal photography began on August 19, 2013. The film was entirely shot in the Los Angeles area, including the cities of Pasadena and Arcadia, the San Fernando Valley, and Melody Ranch in Newhall. Filming lasted through October 2013.

== Release ==
The film premiered at the El Capitan Theatre in Los Angeles on October 6, 2014.

=== Home media ===
The film was released by Walt Disney Studios Home Entertainment on DVD and Blu-ray on January 27, 2015. It debuted at the top of the home video chart in its first week.

== Reception ==
=== Box office ===
The film grossed $67 million in the United States and Canada, and $34.4 million in other countries, for a worldwide total of $101.4 million.

In North America, the film earned $5.2 million on its opening day and $18.3 million in its opening weekend, placing third behind Gone Girl and Dracula Untold. In its second weekend, it dropped to number four, grossing an additional $11.4 million. In its third weekend, it dropped to number seven, grossing $7.1 million. In its fourth weekend, it dropped to number eight, grossing $6.5 million.

=== Critical response ===
On the review aggregator website Rotten Tomatoes, 62% of 118 critics' reviews are positive. The website's consensus reads: "Affably pleasant without ever trying to be anything more, Alexander and the Terrible, Horrible, No Good, Very Bad Day is a fine—albeit forgettable—family diversion."Metacritic, which uses a weighted average, assigned the film a score of 54 out of 100, based on 28 critics, indicating "mixed or average" reviews. Audiences polled by CinemaScore gave the film an average grade of "A−" on an A+ to F scale.

Todd McCarthy of The Hollywood Reporter gave the film a positive review, saying "Alexander and the Terrible, Horrible, No Good, Very Bad Day could have been a lot more horrible and no good than it is." Stephen Whitty of the Newark Star-Ledger gave the film three out of four stars, saying "It's Arteta's ease with generating that slight sense of social awkwardness that makes "Alexander" a cut above the usual live-action family comedy." Alonso Duralde of The Wrap gave the film a negative review, saying "These characters should have to suffer twice as many embarrassments if they want to earn all those adjectives in the title." Sherilyn Connelly of The Village Voice gave the film a negative review, saying "Everything that can go wrong does, and while it has its moments, Miguel Arteta's comedy relies too much on gender-shaming and emasculation jokes."

John Hartl of The Seattle Times gave the film two and a half stars out of four, saying "The movie is so over-the-top that it makes little narrative sense, but it's often successful in its naked pursuit of belly laughs." Katie Rife of The A.V. Club gave the film a B, saying "Alexander is a watchable, affable, pretty good, well-done kids' movie buoyed by a humorous script and talented cast." Bill Goodykoontz of The Arizona Republic gave the film three out of five stars, saying "It turns out the film is not terrible or horrible or very bad. No good? Not that, either."

Claudia Puig of USA Today gave the film two and a half stars out of four, saying "It may have the year's longest title, but Alexander's movie is not terrible, horrible, or even half bad. In fact, Alexander and the Terrible, Horrible, No Good, Very Bad Day is a pleasant, entertaining way to spend just under 90 minutes, particularly if accompanied by children." Sandie Angulo Chen of The Washington Post gave the film three out of four stars, saying "Even the bathroom humor is forgivable when the end result is a crowd-pleasing comedy and a surprisingly entertaining treat for the whole family." Rafer Guzman of Newsday gave the film two and a half stars out of four, saying "Alexander and the Terrible, Horrible, No Good, Very Bad Day, a Disney film, stretches the book thinner than pizza dough and feels about as nutritious. Still, its intentions are good and so is its cast, particularly Ed Oxenbould, a bright-eyed, expressive 13-year-old making his screen debut as Alexander Cooper." Bruce Demara of the Toronto Star gave the film three out of four stars, saying "Director Miguel Arteta, whose previous work is a mixed bag of television and film, gets almost everything right here, including bringing together a solid cast." A.O. Scott of The New York Times gave the film a negative review, saying "'Alexander and the Terrible, Horrible, No Good, Very Bad Day is the latest example of a wonderful children's book turned into a mediocre movie. This kind of thing happens so frequently — exceptions like Where the Wild Things Are and, arguably, Shrek prove the rule upheld by every recent big-screen Dr. Seuss adaptation — that you could almost believe that there is malice involved."

Betsy Sharkey of the Los Angeles Times called the film "Not so terribly horrible. Not so terribly terrific either." Tom Russo of The Boston Globe gave the film a positive review, saying "What the filmmakers come up with is a modestly likable mix of zany and gently warmhearted, even if they overdo both elements at times." David Hiltbrand of The Philadelphia Inquirer gave the film two out of four stars, saying "It's a film where you start chuckling as soon as someone says something like, "I just want everything to be perfect tonight." Adam Graham of The Detroit News gave the film a B−, saying "Alexander won't change your day, but it's not terrible, horrible, no good or very bad, either."

Calvin Wilson of the St. Louis Post-Dispatch gave the film a three out of four stars, saying "Arteta keeps the action speeding along while eliciting spot-on performances. Carell is at his discombobulated best, and Garner anchors the proceedings with aplomb." Lindsey Bahr gave the film a B, saying "Alexander is pleasantly devoid of the vulgarity and too-current pop culture references that are the default mode for many contemporary live-action kids' pics, and its earnest celebration of family gives the movie a comforting throwback vibe." Bruce Ingram of the Chicago Sun-Times gave the film two and half stars out of four, saying "Disney's bland comedy Alexander and the Terrible, Horrible, No Good, Very Bad Day might have been a little more entertaining if it had been a little more, terrible, horrible, no good and so forth." Joe Neumaier of the New York Daily News two out of five stars, saying "Just another loud, boy-centric comedy aimed at 'tweens. The movie turns a slight children's book — in this case, Judith Viorst's 1972 fave, from which it takes mainly the title — into a charmless mishmash."

== Soundtrack ==
On April 1, 2014, Christophe Beck was hired to score the film. Walt Disney Records released the EP soundtrack album on October 7, 2014. It features songs from the film, and new tracks by various artists, like The Vamps, Kerris and Justine Dorsey, The Narwhals, Charles William, and IDK & The Whatevs.

== Reboot ==
In December 2020, Disney hired writer Matt Lopez to pen a sequel to the film for Disney+. It follows a similar plot, but instead focuses on a "multigenerational Latino family". 21 Laps Entertainment and The Jim Henson Company are also set to return. In October 2022, Marvin Lemus signed on to direct while Eva Longoria was cast as Alexander's mother. The new film features the family going on a road trip. By March 2024, its title was changed to Alexander and the Terrible, Horrible, No Good, Very Bad Road Trip.
