= Family Reunion (TV series) =

2019 American comedy streaming television series

- Genre: Comedy; Sitcom
- Created by: Meg DeLoatch
- Starring: Tia Mowry; Anthony Alabi; Talia Jackson; Isaiah Russell-Bailey; Cameron J. Wright; Jordyn Raya James; Loretta Devine
- Composer: Wendell Hanes
- Country of origin: United States
- Original language: English
- No. of seasons: 3 (5 parts)
- No. of episodes: 46 +1 Crossover Episode

Production
- Executive producers: Meg DeLoatch; Robert Prinz; Arthur Harris; Adrienne Carter; Tia Mowry
- Producers: Robert West; Scott Hartle
- Cinematography: John Simmons; Antar Abderrahman; Clifford Jones
- Editor: Russell Griffin
- Camera setup: Multi-camera
- Running time: 24–34 minutes
- Production company: Mega Diva

Original release
- Network: Netflix
- Release: July 10, 2019 – October 27, 2022

Family Reunion is an American sitcom created by Meg DeLoatch that was released via streaming on Netflix on July 10, 2019. In September 2019, the series was renewed for a second season which premiered on April 5, 2021. Part 4 was released on August 26, 2021. In October 2021, the series was renewed for a third and final season, Part 5, which premiered on October 27, 2022. A bonus crossover episode set before the second half of season 2 was released "Remember the Family's Feud" under the name Game On: A Comedy Crossover Event on August 10, 2020

== Premise ==
A family of six from Seattle, Washington visits Columbus, Georgia to attend a family reunion. They decide to relocate there to be closer to their family.

== Cast and characters ==
=== Main ===
- Tia Mowry as Nicole "Cocoa" Joie McKellan, a mother of five (as of Season 3) who believes in new-age parenting and sometimes is very sassy but still loves her kids.
- Anthony Alabi as Moses "Moz" Deuteronomy McKellan, Cocoa's husband and a former Seahawks tight end. Although a strict person at times, he cares about his children. He might be strict, but he has a soft spot and loves to sit and joke around with his family.
- Talia Jackson as Jade McKellan, Cocoa and Moz's firstborn and older daughter, who is boy-crazy and a little rebellious.
- Isaiah Russell-Bailey as Shaka McKellan (seasons 1–2); Cocoa and Moz's older son. He is shown to be a very intelligent and academically inclined. In season 3 (also known as Part 5) he does not appear because he is attending an elite boarding school.
- Cameron J. Wright as Mazzi McKellan, Cocoa and Moz's second son, who has a passion for singing and composing music.
- Jordyn Raya James as Amelia "Ami" Nicole McKellan, Cocoa and Moz's younger daughter. As of Season 3, she is 12 years old.
- Loretta Devine as Amelia Louise "M'Dear" McKellan, née Williams, Moz's Deep Southern old-fashioned churchgoing mother.

=== Recurring ===
- Richard Roundtree as Jebediah McKellan, a pastor, M'Dear's husband of 43 years, Moz's father, and a prostate cancer survivor.
- Warren Burke as Daniel, Moz's childish brother
- Lexi Underwood as Ava (season 1), Jade's friend from church
- Naomi Grace as Genevieve, Jade's friend from school who speaks with a British accent.
- Mark Curry as Principal Glass (seasons 1–2), the principal of Maya Angelou Magnet School
- Lindsey Da Sylveira as Mikayla, Jade's nemesis, a Black activist and mocks Jade for not being “Black enough”.
- Telma Hopkins as Maybelle, M'Dear's sister who got married 4 times (5 times including her marriage to Tony in Season 3)
- Lance Alexander as Elvis, a McKellan family friend who has a crush on Jade. In Season 3, his figure changes drastically.
- Journey Carter as Renee, one of Jade's friends
- Jasun Jabbar Wardlaw, Jr. as Tyson (season 3), Moz and Cocoa's nephew and Maureen's son, whose behavior is troublesome since his father's passing but shapes up with the support of his family in Columbus.
- Legend and Legacy Jordan as Skye McKellan, Cocoa and Moz's lastborn and youngest son; Jade, Shaka, Mazzi, and Ami's youngest sibling; Daniel and Grace's nephew; M'Dear and Grandpa Jeb's fifth grandchild from Moz and Cocoa.

=== Guest stars ===
- Erica Ash as Grace, Moz and Daniel's older sister
- Charlie Wilson as Himself
- Charlie Ward as Himself (season 1)
- Tyler Cole as Royale (season 1), Jade's ex-boyfriend
- Amanda Detmer as Haven Sheeks
- Jaleel White as Eric
- Tempestt Bledsoe as Katrina
- Noah Alexander Gerry as Drew (season 1), Jade's crush
- DeLon Shaw as Missy, Jade's friend at school
- Jackée Harry as Aunt Dot (seasons 1, 3), M'Dear and Maybelle's sister
- Rome Flynn as Tony Olsen (seasons 1, 3)
- Peri Gilpin as Daphne (season 2), Cocoa's mother
- Kenya Moore as Herself (season 2)
- Candiace Dillard Bassett as Sunita Chanel (season 2)
- Brandi Glanville as Heidi (season 2)
- Akira Akbar as Brooke (season 2), Shaka's friend at school
- Bruce Bruce as Brother Davis (season 2)
- Nicco Annan as Barron (season 2), Moz's cousin and Shaka's godfather, who is gay
- Willie Gault as Himself (season 2)
- Anika Noni Rose as Miss Karen (season 2), Mazzi's piano teacher
- Tahj Mowry as Mr. Dean (season 2)
- Bella Podaras as Kelly-Ann (season 2)
- Monique Coleman as Ebony (season 2)
- Jadah Marie as Morgan (season 2), Shaka's girlfriend
- Ariel Martin as Jinji Starr (season 2)
- Essence Atkins as Aunt Maureen (season 3), Cocoa's paternal half-sister
- Lela Rochon as Dr. Turner (season 3)
- Rachel True as Cheryl (season 3), Cocoa's cousin
- Wendy Raquel Robinson as Joyce (season 3), Tony's mother and Maybelle's mother-in-law
- Robert Ri'chard as Vic (season 3)

== Episodes ==
=== Series overview ===
Season	Episodes		Originally released
1	20	10	July 10, 2019
1	20	1	December 9, 2019
1	20	9	January 20, 2020
2	15	8	April 5, 2021
2	15	7	August 26, 2021
3	10		October 27, 2022

=== Season 1 (2019–20) ===
No. overall	No. in season	Title	Directed by	Written by	Original release date
Part 1
1	1	"Remember How This All Started?"	Eric Dean Seaton	Meg DeLoatch	July 10, 2019
The McKellans head to a family reunion at M'Dear and Grandpa's house, where Moz, Cocoa, and the kids consider a simpler life away from city comforts.
2	2	"Remember Charlie Wilson?"	Eric Dean Seaton	Beverly DeLoatch & Charity L. Miller	July 10, 2019
The family begins to unpack and settle in, but not everyone accepts the change so quickly. Jade must share a room with Ami, who does crazy things in her sleep, keeping Jade up all night. She refuses to continue this and starts to move upstairs to the attic. Meanwhile, Mazzi and Shaka discover an autograph signed by Charlie Wilson and M'Dear reveals that she was once involved with him; she claims that she helped him with a few things but never actually dated him. Grandpa gets furious and refuses to believe it, and ignores her attempts to explain. As Shaka and Mazzi started this by snooping around M'Dear's things, Moz grounds the boys until they figure out how to get their grandparents to make up. When all else fails, the boys turn to Jade for help, which she initially refuses, but agrees after M'Dear moves up to the attic with her and prevents her from sleeping, by loudly praying to God for a long time and snoring in her sleep. They invite Wilson over to clear things up and he confirms that he didn't date M'Dear, causing M'Dear and Grandpa to reconcile. The Mckellans hang out with Wilson and sing his songs.
3	3	"Remember Vacation Bible School?"	Jody Margolin Hahn	Adrienne Carter	July 10, 2019
Moz gets the kids go-karts but Cocoa is totally against them; claiming that the kids will get hurt, she forbids them to ride them. Moz rides them with the kids, but Ami hurts her knee and Mazzi hurts his hand. The three agree to not tell Cocoa, but that night at dinner Ami limps and Mazzi eats with one hand, and the truth comes out. Meanwhile, M'Dear takes Jade and Shaka to Vacation Bible School, where she challenges everyone to recite as many Bible verses as possible with a certain word. She beats and humiliates everybody including Jade, Shaka, and Elvis. Determined to beat M'Dear, Jade takes Shaka's suggestion and uses a Bible-verse app to cheat and ends up beating her. However, M'Dear decides to do this at church, and before they begin she takes out Jade's earpiece, causing her to lose the competition. Jade ends up confessing to everyone and apologizing to M'Dear while the family hangs out on the porch after services. It turns out that Cocoa also drove a go-kart and got injured.
4	4	"Remember When I Lost My Sister?"	Leonard R. Garner, Jr.	Ralph Greene	July 10, 2019
Jade takes Ami to the park and runs into Drew. While Ami and Drew's sister play together, Jade and Drew hang out. The four go to the movies, but the two pairs watch different movies and the older siblings forget about their younger siblings. When Cocoa accompanies M'Dear to Bible Study, she unintentionally upsets the other women there by revealing that she didn't have a home church in Seattle, attempting to teach them about figures from other religious traditions, and encouraging them to read a book of Bahá'u'lláh. When Cocoa returns, M'Dear helps them accept Cocoa's beliefs, and the ladies end up opening up and are willing to learn from M'Dear. Meanwhile, Shaka hangs out with Grayson and Elvis and makes a bet with them to see who can stay in a creepy basement the longest. They get freaked out by a woman (a member of M'Dear's Bible-study group) they found whom they thought was dead but she wasn't. They rip off her leg and she threatens to beat them with it. Shaka wins the bet but M'Dear reveals that Grayson is struggling and gives him supplies, including his sneakers, which he would've won if Shaka had lost the bet.
5	5	"Remember Grace Under Fire?"	Leonard R. Garner, Jr.	Chris Moore	July 10, 2019
Aunt Grace visits and everyone greets her with love. She agrees to take Cocoa to the Women's Revival which she claims to be attending at Moz's request, but they end up going to "Prettyboy's", a teen/adult hangout, where they see Jade waiting with her friends for Drew, who had asked her to hang out, and she had sneaked out to meet him. She tries to hide from her mom and aunt and successfully leaves the place, but is disappointed to hear that Drew arrived after she left! Grace encounters someone whom she helped get into a relationship. After that she tells Cocoa that she dropped out of the seminary she had supposedly been attending and her parents don't know. She's actually a matchmaker for people who are trying to form spiritual connections. Cocoa promises not to reveal her secret. When they get back, M'Dear and Grandpa discover they were at the hangout and yell at them but are interrupted by a sudden kitchen fire. However, the next morning, Grandpa finds out that Grace dropped out and resumes their fight. Meanwhile, the kids are held responsible for the fire and Moz grounds them until the true culprit confesses. They investigate the kitchen fire and through a series of crazy theories it's revealed that Shaka accidentally started it while playing a game and making a snack at the same time, but he reveals that he has dirt on everyone else, so they promise not to tell. When Moz talks to them, the kids decide to reveal their secrets. M'Dear spanks Shaka for starting the fire. Grace leaves, but not before reconciling with her parents, who accept her decisions.
6	6	"Remember That Crazy Road Trip?"	Eric Dean Seaton	Anthony C. Hill	July 10, 2019
When the family is at a restaurant, they notice two people and immediately exit the place without telling M'Dear what was going on. At home they reluctantly tell M'Dear the story of their awful road trip to her house. They rented an RV for the trip. After driving for a few hours and getting lost in Idaho, they found a place to eat and Jade met a cute guy named Parker, but he tried to set her up with his dad, who was already married to two women at once and was looking for a third plural wife. The family ran away in fear. Some time later they blew a tire and a man crashed his car into their RV and escaped on a bike. Then they met a couple named Clyde and Angie in the woods and sat around a campfire with them until they revealed themselves as voodoo priests; once again the family fled in terror. The next morning they got into a fight with a raccoon which they had presumed was dead. They finally reach M'Dear's house and emerge, each a battle-scarred mess, from the RV, as in the second episode. M'Dear doesn't believe the tale and goes for a run, but comes tearing back to her house after she encounters Clyde and Angie in the woods; the family runs away again.
7	7	"Remember the First Day of School?"	Eric Dean Seaton	Taylor Vaughn Lasley	July 10, 2019
On the children's first day of school, all four of them end up in tough situations. After a registration mishap, Mazzi poses as a fourth-grader because he's not ready to go to fifth grade and the teacher gives out candy for correct answers. Shaka gets a crush on a girl after finding her backpack. Jade and some of her friends get detention and three-day suspension when the principal, who had served in the military, declares their regular school outfits unacceptable. In detention, they discover that only the girls face dress code violations; the boys are excused. Jade starts a protest in the hallway that involves Moz and Cocoa. Eventually, M'Dear joins as well, and the protest leads to the principal revoking the girls' suspensions and changing the dress code. Moz finds Mazzi and after they have a talk, he's ready to start the fifth grade. Shaka gives his crush's backpack to her and gets her phone number.
8	8	"Remember Macho Mazzi?"	Kelly Park	Henry "Hank" Jones	July 10, 2019
Mazzi is making treats for his Uncle Daniel and Moz and they all have a good time together. When Mazzi leaves, he overhears Moz joke about his status as a musician, unintentionally hurting his feelings. Wanting to impress his father, he decides to try out for his school's football team. However, after playing for a while, he starts to act mean towards the crowd during the games and treat others disrespectfully, including Cocoa. Moz confronts him, which ends up with Mazzi revealing that he overheard him, and Moz apologizes for his statements while Mazzi reconsiders playing an instrument. Meanwhile, Jade decides to enter the town's beauty pageant and hires a pageant coach, a former beauty queen who turns out to be self-absorbed and focuses on a person's looks rather than the true self...and reveals that she only wanted to coach Jade because of her skin tone, which would improve her status if Jade won. This ends up with Jade wearing a brown afro wig, big hoop earrings, and a spray tan that covers her natural skin color, which she doesn't like. Cocoa engages in an argument with Jade's pageant coach and tells her off, then tells Jade that she's beautiful by being herself and doesn't need the wig or spray tan. Realizing that her mother is right, Jade fires the coach, competes without those items, and wins the pageant. Jade, Cocoa, and her family celebrate the victory on the porch with Mazzi's cookies.
9	9	"Remember Black Elvis?"	Eric Dean Seaton	Howard Jordan, Jr.	July 10, 2019
Jade takes a locket from M'Dear's room and wears it to school. Her friends see a photo of two people in the picture, and when they ask Jade who they are, she doesn't know. M'Dear tells the kids a story about their ancestors. The people in the photo were former slaves who had managed to successfully escape and have a daughter together and even started the tradition of hanging a ribbon on a certain broom during wedding ceremonies. The locket has been passed down from several people with their own stories, including M'Dear's aunt, who was a nightclub singer who was nearly assaulted by a mobster until she was saved by the club's white owner, whom she loved. M'Dear finishes with her own story: she lost the locket at a party and it was returned to her by young Jeb McKellan, and their relationship blossomed from there.At the end of the story, Jade and Ami fight over who will get the locket next, but M'Dear tells the girls that she already promised the locket to Aunt Grace. However, she agrees to let them in on another family tradition: the matrimonial jumping of the McKellan family broom. Meanwhile, Cocoa and Moz are revisiting the day of their wedding after M’Dear reprimands them for having been married by a Black Elvis impersonator instead of in a church, and they spend the night dancing at a club which ends up with Cocoa punching Daniel's obsessive, crazy date in the face. When Cocoa and Moz get home, they tell the kids that they didn't have a church wedding. She proposes that she and Moz remarry and he accepts.
10	10	"Remember When Our Boys Became Men?"	Robbie Countryman	Lia Prewitt-Martin	July 10, 2019
M'Dear introduces Jade to a new boy named Kurt and asks her to show him around town. Jade is totally against this at first, but after meeting him she starts to like him. They hang out on the porch and talk, tell jokes, and go to Prettyboy's to play chess. While they're there, she encounters Drew, who becomes suspicious of her friendship with Kurt and cancels their bowling date. Jade decides to ask Kurt out, but he says he has started to date Ava. Meanwhile, Mazzi and Shaka start mowing lawns with Elvis to earn money for a PlayStation but when they try to get inside the house afterward, a police officer finds and handcuffs them. Cocoa and Moz return to the house and are forced to explain that the situation was based on their skin color. The next day, the boys refuse to go outside, loathe to encounter that officer again, but Grandpa surprises them with a PlayStation! A few days later, Cocoa and Moz are coming home from a trivia-game night when the same officer pulls Moz over (he had done nothing wrong), angrily explaining how Moz's file of complaint against him almost cost him his job. Cocoa decides that this town is no longer safe and that they will be moving back to Seattle.
Special
11	11	"A Family Reunion Christmas"	Robbie Countryman	Sa'Rah L. Jones	December 9, 2019
Part 2
12	12	"Remember the Dance Battle?"	Morenike Joela	Anthony C. Hill	January 20, 2020
The episode starts off with a party celebrating the firing of the cop that pulled Moz over. The next day at school, Shaka and his friend learn that the step team is holding tryouts, which fires up Cocoa's competitive streak as she pressures Shaka. Meanwhile, Jade learns that her math teacher is dating Daniel, and she's forced to ace math to go on a school trip.
13	13	"Remember When Daddy Came Home?"	Eric Dean Seaton	Ralph Greene	January 20, 2020
14	14	"Remember Our Parents' Wedding?"	Richard Lyons	Adrienne Carter	January 20, 2020
Only a few days before Cocoa and Moz’s wedding, her famous white mother Daphne, who has earned two Emmys, arrives for the ceremony. M'Dear, a fan of her work, is delighted, but Cocoa must put up with Daphne's criticisms of her weight and appearance. Cocoa goes to extreme measures to lose weight to the point that she faints; instead of being concerned, Daphne only makes worse comments. When Cocoa is faced with her insecurities, Moz reminds her that Daphne is no expert on their relationship and that Cocoa is perfect the way she is. The night before the wedding, Daphne crosses a line by making a deprecating comment about Jade, causing a furious Cocoa to confront Daphne for trying to convert her ridiculously-high standards onto others like she did with Cocoa when she was growing up, and Cocoa uninvites her mother to the wedding. M’Dear also abandons her admiration for Daphne after this. But during the wedding, Daphne returns to apologize to Cocoa for her behavior, recounting how her own mother made the very same comments to her, and they reconcile. Meanwhile, best men Mazzi and Shaka accidentally drop the ring in dip and seek out pawnshop-owner Squee to help them clean it, but Squee manipulates them into naïvely trading the rings for fakes. Daniel realizes this and goes to confront Squee, who won't give the ring back until Daniel hands over the prized watch that his late grandfather had given him. Impressed with Daniel’s selfless sacrifice, Grandpa visits Squee and "talks" him into giving back Daniel's watch. The episode ends with Moz and Cocoa marrying for the second time and the whole family watches them partake in the McKellan family tradition of “jumping the broom.”
15	15	"Remember When Jade Was Down with the Swirl?"	Angela Gomes	Taylor Vaughn Lasley	January 20, 2020
16	16	"Remember When Shaka Got Beat Up?"	Juanesta Carlota Holmes	Henry "Hank" Jones & Chris Moore	January 20, 2020
17	17	"Remember the G Club?"	Jody Margolin Hahn	Howard Jordan, Jr.	January 20, 2020
18	18	"Remember Cousin Kenya?"	Kelly Park	Sa'Rah L. Jones & Lia Prewitt-Martin	January 20, 2020
19	19	"Remember M'dear's Fifteen Minutes?"	Eric Dean Seaton	Judy Dent	January 20, 2020
20	20	"Remember When the Party Was Over?"	Eric Dean Seaton	Meg DeLoatch	January 20, 2020
Jade is depressed and unwilling to celebrate her fifteenth birthday since her parents have banned Royale from attending. Her friends convince her to throw a masquerade party so they can sneak Royale in, but he refuses to attend while hiding his identity, as it goes his principles, much to Jade's disappointment. When M'Dear goes shopping, Moz and Cocoa discover that their card has been frozen. They speak to their financial advisor, who reveals that they've have been paying three mortgages (including Uncle Daniel's), and are nearly broke, so they are forced to lie low with their spending spree. Moz and Cocoa keep this secret from the rest of the family, but struggle to adapt without paying for their daily luxuries. Meanwhile, Shaka is still angry with Elvis for his betrayal in the last episode, and he tries to force Mazzi to stop hanging out with him. Mazzi refuses, so Shaka forms a "friendship" with Mazzi's rival Braylan as payback, which severs the brothers' own relationship. Moz and Cocoa fly in two of Jade's friends from Seattle her friends from Seattle to surprise her at her party, but what ultimately lifts Jade's spirits is Royale, who crashes the party in disguise. He reveals he is leaving Georgia, so the two confess their love for each other and share a kiss, but they are caught by Moz, who forces Royale out. Meanwhile, M'Dear has overheard Moz and Cocoa's financial advisor reveal that the McKellans are officially broke, so she says they can stay as long as they need to; then Cocoa receives a note revealing that Jade has run away with Royale.

=== Season 2 (2021) ===
No. overall	No. in season	Title	Directed by	Written by	Original release date
Part 3
21	1	"Remember Mazzi's First Love?"	Juanesta Carlota Holmes	Anthony C. Hill	April 5, 2021
22	2	"Remember When Jade Broke a Nail??!"	Robbie Countryman	Ralph Greene	April 5, 2021
23	3	"Remember When Cocoa Was a Housewife?"	Robbie Countryman	Arthur Harris	April 5, 2021
Cocoa's cousin Kenya invites her to guest-star on her show "Trophy Wives" to promote her jewelry line, but during her day there, Cocoa stands up to Kenya's co-stars when they're rude to her and actually submits them to a good roast. This prompts the network to have Cocoa on the show as a regular. However, things get chaotic as Cocoa brings Ami along for an episode. Meanwhile, Moz grapples with Jade dating Deon after learning about his juvie record. Moz confronts the two upon discovering that they've deviated from their original date and it's clear that he doesn't trust Jade as much since her escapade with Royale.
24	4	"Remember When M'Dear Changed History?"	Eric Dean Seaton	Meg DeLoatch	April 5, 2021
25	5	"Remember the False Idol?"	Morenike Joela	Deja Harrell	April 5, 2021
26	6	"Remember When Shaka Did the Robot?"	Kelly Park	Anthony C. Hill	April 5, 2021
27	7	"Remember When the Glass Passed?"	Juanesta Carlota Holmes	Ralph Greene	April 5, 2021
The McKellan children are shocked to learn that Principal Glass has died. Jade is conflicted because of her past clashes with Glass; she thinks she's the only McKellan who didn't have a positive relationship with him. She refuses to take part in singing at the Second Line in Glass' honor until she gets a visit from his spirit, who tells her that in spite of their differences, he always saw great potential in her. This inspires her to attend the ceremony. Meanwhile, Mazzi deals with death anxiety until M'Dear takes him and Ami to a funeral home and gives them a light-humored talk about life and death.
28	8	"Remember When Cocoa Found Her Calling?"	Richard Lyons	Sa'Rah L. Jones & Lia Prewitt-Martin	April 5, 2021
Part 4
29	9	"Remember When the Trick Wasn't a Treat?"	Russell Griffin	Chris Moore	August 26, 2021
30	10	"Remember When M'Dear Stole the Show?"	Leonard R. Garner Jr.	Meg DeLoatch & George Blake	August 26, 2021
31	11	"Remember When Jade Thought She Was Grown?"	Morenike Joela	Lia Prewitt-Martin	August 26, 2021
32	12	"Remember the Story M'Dear Hates to Tell?"	Sheldon Epps	Arthur Harris	August 26, 2021
33	13	"Remember My Funny Valentine?"	Michael A. Joseph	Meg DeLoatch	August 26, 2021
34	14	"Remember When Cocoa Did It All?"	John Simmons	Chris Moore & Deja Harrell	August 26, 2021
35	15	"Remember M'Dear's Roast?"	Jody Margolin Hahn	Bill Boulware	August 26, 2021

=== Season 3 (2022) ===
No. overall	No. in season	Title	Directed by	Written by	Original release date
Part 5
36	1	"Remember When the Skye Fell?"	Russell Griffin	Adrienne Carter	October 27, 2022
The family steps up when Cocoa goes into labor while Moz and Grandpa race back home from Miami. At the hospital, complications arise when Cocoa experiences unusual severe pain during and after labor, despite the doctor in charge insisting that it's all normal, resulting in her going into a coma. Back home, Mazzi acts unusually mischievous and plays endless pranks on Ami. Mazzi is struggling to cope with the absence of Shaka, who has left for boarding school. Towards the end, 6 months later, Cocoa has survived her ordeal and the family has come together to celebrate the half-year "birthday" of her and Moz's baby son Skye.
37	2	"Remember the New Addition to the Family?"	Morenike Joela Evans	Arthur Harris	October 27, 2022
After singing at church, Jade and M'Dear are approached by the pastor's nephew, a famous rapper (Coy Stewart), to sing on his new song. When they listen to it, it turns out to contain sexual references to which M'Dear objects. Jade confronts him, he disrespects his uncle, the church, and his own grandma. Jade was recording the whole thing and threatens to put it on TikTok. He visits the church to apologize for the song and starts to perform a new version of it, about Jesus. Meanwhile, Cocoa's sister (Essence Atkins) visits with her son Tyson after he gets in trouble back home in Detroit, and he takes Mazzi and Ami for a joyride in Moz's car. This behavior is a result of his father passing away.
38	3	"Remember Stompin' the Yard?"	Robbie Countryman	Deja Harrell	October 27, 2022
39	4	"Remember the Homecoming Queen?"	Juanesta Carlota Holmes	Lia Prewitt-Martin	October 27, 2022
40	5	"Remember When Elvis Broke Jesus?"	Ron Moseley	Amber McCain	October 27, 2022
41	6	"Remember When the Raccoon Crashed the Wedding?"	Sheldon Epps	Sa'Rah L. Jones	October 27, 2022
42	7	"Remember When Mazzi Almost Lost It?"	Rob Deane	Warren Hutcherson	October 27, 2022
43	8	"Remember When Jade Walked in M'Dear's Shoes?"	Leonard R. Garner, Jr.	Bill Boulware	October 27, 2022
44	9	"Remember Our 20 Acres and a Deed?"	Eric Dean Seaton	Shawnté McCall	October 27, 2022
45	10	"Remember the New Beginning?"	John Simmons	Beverly DeLoatch	October 27, 2022

== Production ==
=== Development ===
On October 17, 2018, it was announced that Netflix had given the production a straight-to-series order for a first season consisting of twenty episodes. The series was created by Meg DeLoatch who was also expected to executive produce. Production began in Los Angeles. The first part was released on July 10, 2019. On September 17, 2019, Netflix renewed the series for a second season consisting of sixteen episodes. It was also announced that there will be a holiday special that was released on December 9, 2019, and the nine extra season 1 episodes were released on January 20, 2020. The second season premiered on April 5, 2021. Part 4 was released on August 26, 2021. On October 18, 2021, Netflix renewed the series for a 10-episode third and final season. The third season premiered on October 27, 2022.

=== Casting ===
Alongside the initial series announcement, it was reported that Tia Mowry, Loretta Devine, Anthony Alabi, Talia Jackson, Isaiah Russell-Bailey, Cameron J. Wright, and Jordyn James had been cast in series regular roles.

== Reception ==
=== Critical response ===
The review aggregation website Rotten Tomatoes reported a 67% approval rating for the series, based on 6 reviews, with an average rating of 5/10.

=== Awards and nominations ===
The series received numerous awards and nominations, it won NAACP Image Awards for Outstanding Children's Program in 2020, 2021 and 2022. As well as an Art Directors Guild Award for Excellence in Production Design for a Multi-Camera Series in 2022, a Primetime Emmy Award nomination for Outstanding Cinematography for a Multi-Camera Series in 2020. It won an Emmy Award for Outstanding Cinematography for a Multiple Camera Live Action Program in 2023.

== See also ==
- Game On: A Comedy Crossover Event
