= The Expanding Universe of Ashley Garcia =

2020 American comedy streaming television series

- Also known as: Ashley Garcia: Genius in Love
- Genre: Comedy
- Created by: Seth Kurland & Mario Lopez
- Starring: Paulina Chávez; Conor Husting; Bella Podaras; Reed Horstmann; Jencarlos Canela
- Music by: Danny Lux; Michael Reola
- Country of origin: United States
- Original language: English
- No. of seasons: 1 (3 parts)
- No. of episodes: 15

Production
- Executive producers: Seth Kurland; Mario Lopez; David Kendall; Mark Schulman; Paulina Chávez
- Producers: Philippe Iujvidin; Patty Gary-Cox
- Cinematography: John Simmons
- Editor: Stephen Prime
- Camera setup: Multi-camera
- Running time: 25–34 minutes
- Production companies: Boop Kugland Productions; Viamar Productions

Original release
- Network: Netflix
- Release: February 17 – December 9, 2020

The Expanding Universe of Ashley Garcia (also known as Ashley Garcia: Genius in Love) is an American comedy television series created by Mario Lopez and Seth Kurland that premiered via streaming on Netflix on February 17, 2020. The second part of the first season was released on July 20, 2020. In August 2020, the series was canceled after one season, and the series ended with a Christmas special that was released on December 9, 2020.

The series was nominated at the 48th Daytime Creative Arts Emmy Awards for three awards, including Outstanding Directing Team for a Daytime Fiction Program.

== Premise ==
The Expanding Universe of Ashley Garcia (also called Ashley Garcia: Genius in Love) follows a prodigy named Ashley Garcia, the "only 15-and-a-half-year-old robotics engineer and rocket scientist" in the world who moves in with her Uncle Victor from the other side of the country for a chance to work for NASA.

== Cast and characters ==
=== Main ===
- Paulina Chávez as Ashley Garcia, the youngest robotics engineer and rocket scientist at Jet Propulsion Laboratory (JPL) who also has PhDs in Robotics and Applied Mathematics
- Conor Husting as Tad Cameron, the captain of football team at Crown City High School and Ashley's love interest
- Bella Podaras as Brooke Bishop, Ashley's childhood best friend and Stick's love interest
- Reed Horstmann as Stick Goldstein, the equipment manager of the Crown City High School football team and Brooke's love interest
- Jencarlos Canela as Victor Garcia, Ashley's uncle, the football coach at Crown City High School, and co-owner of a coffeehouse named Pat's. He was a former American football placekicker for the Dallas Cowboys.

=== Recurring ===
- Mario Lopez as Nico, Victor's friend and the co-owner of Pat's
- Haley Pullos as Bella Schmerz, Tad's on-and-off girlfriend
- Chelsea Kane as Ava Germaine, Ashley's best friend from MIT and Victor's love interest

== Production ==
=== Development ===
On May 23, 2019, it was announced that Netflix had given the production a straight-to-series order for a first season consisting of six episodes. The series was created by Mario Lopez and Seth Kurland, both of whom were also expected to executive produce alongside David Kendall. On July 30, 2019, it was reported that Jody Margolin Hahn is set to direct the pilot and several other episodes. The series was released on February 17, 2020. The second part of the first season was released on July 20, 2020. On August 31, 2020, Netflix opted not to order a third season for the series, but ended the series with a Christmas special that was released on December 9, 2020.

=== Casting ===
Alongside the initial series announcement, it was reported that Paulina Chávez and Jencarlos Canela had been cast in series regular roles.

=== Filming ===
The series was filmed at Sunset Bronson Studios in Hollywood, California, but it is set in Pasadena, California.

== Reception ==
At the 48th Daytime Creative Arts Emmy Awards the series was nominated for Outstanding Directing Team for a Daytime Fiction Program, Outstanding Multiple Camera Editing for a Drama or Daytime Fiction Program and Outstanding Technical Team.

== Episodes ==
No.	Title	Directed by	Written by	Original release date
Part 1
1	"Breath Mint"	Jody Margolin Hahn	Teleplay by : Seth Kurland; Story by : Pamela Corkey and Seth Kurland & Mario Lopez	February 17, 2020
2	"Spin, Doctor"	Jonathan Judge	Julie Whitesell	February 17, 2020
3	"Haptics"	Jody Margolin Hahn	Seth Kurland	February 17, 2020
4	"The Search for Intelligent Life"	Jody Margolin Hahn	David Kendall	February 17, 2020
5	"No Scientific Basis Whatsoever"	Eva Longoria	Philippe Iujvidin	February 17, 2020
Tad is convinced that, as long as he has his lucky headband, the team will win every game. Ashley thinks that the headband has nothing to do with Tad winning and she replaces his lucky charm with a fake one to prove her point. However, without his lucky charm, Tad starts playing badly.
6	"Me Caes Bien"	Eva Longoria	Molly Haldeman & Camilla Rubis	February 17, 2020
7	"Hasta La Vista, Baby"	Melissa Joan Hart	Jessica Lopez	February 17, 2020
8	"Go to a High School Dance"	Jeff Melman	Sam Stefanak	February 17, 2020
Part 2
9	"In Tad We Trust"	Jeff Melman	Heather Dean & Rosie Borchert	July 20, 2020
10	"Failure Is Not an Option"	Jean Sagal	Philippe Iujvidin	July 20, 2020
11	"Unintended Consequences"	Adam Weissman	Molly Haldeman & Camilla Rubis	July 20, 2020
12	"Count Me In"	Rob Schiller	Heather Dean & Rosie Borchert	July 20, 2020
13	"Rewriting Girl Code"	Jody Margolin Hahn	Julie Whitesell	July 20, 2020
14	"Another Trip Around the Sun"	Andrew DeYoung	Sam Stefanak	July 20, 2020
Christmas special
15	"The True Meaning of Christmas Togetherness Funtime"	David Kendall	Teleplay by : Seth Kurland & David Kendall; Story by : Molly Haldeman & Camilla Rubis	December 9, 2020

== See also ==
- Game On: A Comedy Crossover Event
