= Crater (film) =

2023 film by Kyle Patrick Alvarez

- Official release poster
- Directed by: Kyle Patrick Alvarez
- Written by: John Griffin
- Produced by: Dan Cohen; Dan Levine; Shawn Levy
- Starring: Isaiah Russell-Bailey; Mckenna Grace; Billy Barratt; Orson Hong; Thomas Boyce; Scott Mescudi
- Cinematography: Jas Shelton
- Edited by: James W. Harrison III
- Music by: Dan Romer; Osei Essed
- Production companies: Walt Disney Pictures; 21 Laps Entertainment
- Distributed by: Disney+
- Release date: May 12, 2023
- Running time: 105 minutes
- Country: United States
- Language: English

Crater is a 2023 American science fiction adventure film directed by Kyle Patrick Alvarez and written by John Griffin. It stars Isaiah Russell-Bailey, Mckenna Grace, Billy Barratt, Orson Hong, Thomas Boyce, and Scott Mescudi. Crater was released on Disney+ on May 12, 2023, but was removed from the service on June 30, 2023. It was later re-released digitally on September 26, 2023. It generally received positive reviews from critics.

== Plot ==
In 2257, humans have mined the Moon for resources, following the failure to colonize it. Miners sign a contract to work for 20 years before they are allowed to take a shuttle to colonize another planet called Omega. Should someone die before their allotted years are filled, their next of kin must fill out the remaining years plus their own 20 if they are over the age of 18. Caleb Channing's father, Michael, dies in a mining accident. According to the death benefits in his father's contract, since Caleb is under 18 and has no living next of kin on the Moon, he is exempt from the contract and may go to Omega. Caleb does not want to go, but the transport to Omega departs in three days.

Caleb's father left him a map to a crater on the Moon that he promised to go see. Caleb and his best friend Dylan, and their friends Borney and Marcus resolve to go see it before Caleb has to leave, so they plan to steal a lunar rover and take it out to the crater.

In order to do so, Dylan recruits Addison Weaver, the daughter of a scientist from Earth, to give them the passcodes to leave the base. Addison agrees, on the condition that she come along as well. The five take the rover and drive out on the surface of the Moon. During their journey, each of the kids reveal things about themselves such as Borney's neurotic tendencies being the result of his older brother telling him stories and Marcus having a heart condition that he needs to take pills for. Dylan reveals that his father nearly abandoned him and his mother due to his work in the mines.

As they play with the oxygen canisters in a game of launch-off, Borney nearly gets lost in space, but the other kids rescue him. Having lost a lot of oxygen, they locate an outpost and head there to discover that it is actually a model home from the time when humans planned to colonize the Moon. The kids find oxygen and food and spend the night. Addison regales them with stories about Earth history and her fear of humanity losing it all to time. She tells the other kids about how, after her parents divorced, her father brought her to the Moon and her mother took her younger brother Charlie, Addison's best friend, with her to Omega.

The kids take the rover out the next day, only for it to run out of battery. Addison presses the emergency call button before they head out to the crater.

The kids arrive at the crater and discover a giant glowing cube that is an entrance to an underground bunker. They find a hidden button and the bunker simulates the surface of the Earth. Inside a hidden crevice in the floor, Caleb finds his mother's ashes and a photo of his parents. He places his father's ashes next to his mother's. Caleb realizes that his father killed himself so that he could go to Omega and refuses to leave, but Dylan tells him that he must go.

Marcus suddenly collapses from his heart condition. The other kids try to take him back to the rover, only for a meteor storm to come. They manage to make it back, but Dylan's visor is cracked by a falling rock, knocking him unconscious, and the front window of the rover is broken, forcing the kids to continue wearing their suits. Caleb manages to make peace with Dylan as their oxygen runs low and rescuers come.

Caleb awakens to discover that he has already been taken to Omega, devastated that he never got to say goodbye to his friends. He is given a recording device and learns that his friends are all alive and that they were allowed to send a message to him once a year during Caleb's 75-year journey to Omega. Caleb learns that Marcus started a baseball team, and that Addison started a strike to improve the contracts for the miners. They succeeded with Borney becoming the lead administrator. Dylan and Addison eventually got married, had kids, and later grandkids. Caleb comes across Charlie and the two of them share stories.

== Cast ==
- Isaiah Russell-Bailey as Caleb
- Mckenna Grace as Addison
- Billy Barratt as Dylan
- Orson Hong as Borney
- Thomas Boyce as Marcus
- Scott Mescudi as Michael
- Selenis Leyva as Maria
- Hero Hunter as a younger Caleb
- Carson Minniear as Charlie
- Michael Papajohn as a miner
- Brad Davidorf as an adult Dylan
- Dann Florek as an older Dylan

== Production ==
The spec script by John Griffin was initially featured on the 2015 Black List, an annual list of the best unproduced screenplays of the year, where it received 34 votes. On November 8, 2017, it was announced that 20th Century Fox had purchased the script from a pitch by visual effects supervisor Rpin Suwannath. However, as a result of the acquisition of 21st Century Fox by Disney, development on the project was halted. Shawn Levy was initially in negotiations to direct the film, before being replaced by Kyle Patrick Alvarez on January 12, 2021. Levy would later be attached to produce the project instead alongside his 21 Laps Entertainment production partner Dan Levine. Due to the acquisition of Fox, the film was shifted to Disney's streaming service Disney+ for an exclusive streaming premiere instead of the traditional theatrical release.

In March 2021, Mckenna Grace was cast in the film alongside Isaiah Russell-Bailey, Billy Barratt, Orson Hong, and Thomas Boyce. Scott Mescudi was cast in May. Brady Noon was reportedly playing a character named Hector, but he does not appear in the final film.

Principal photography began on June 21, 2021, at Celtic Studios in Baton Rouge, Louisiana. Filming also took place in Los Angeles and lasted until August 20, 2021. A first look image of the film was shared on March 29, 2023.

== Release ==
The film was released on Disney+ on May 12, 2023, and was removed from the service on June 30, 2023, as part of the Disney+/Hulu content purge. In response to backlash surrounding this, it was re-released digitally on multiple platforms including Amazon Prime Video, Vudu and Google Play on September 26, 2023.

== Reception ==
On the review aggregator website Rotten Tomatoes, 66% of 44 critics' reviews are positive, with an average rating of 6/10. Metacritic, which uses a weighted average, assigned the film a score of 65 out of 100, based on 13 critics, indicating "generally favorable" reviews.

Brandon Yu of The New York Times called Crater "lighthearted" and "fun," saying, Crater does well not straining itself trying to please audiences beyond the family crowd. Most of all, the film is surprisingly nimble at incorporating an emotional core that makes its story more interesting than the adventure itself." Valerie Complex of Deadline Hollywood praised the production design and complimented the performances of the cast, stating, "While the film can be hokey at times and super convenient for the protagonists, Crater is a film with something to say about the labor force as well as an environmental message about cherishing and preserving the Earth and all it has to offer." Michael Nordine of Variety praised the performance of Mckenna Grace and said that the film offers a "quiet voice to its characters’ fraught plight."

Mini Anthikad Chhibber of The Hindu found Crater to be a "heart-warming adventure story" and praised the performances of the actors. Robert Daniels of RogerEbert.com gave the film a grade of 3 out of 4 stars and praised Kyle Patrick Alvarez's direction, asserting, "Crater might be too dark on a thematic level for some tweens, but the light it brings into the genre makes Alvarez’s film a soul-stirring escapade, one that introduces young audiences to ways to reform the fractured world they call home." Jennifer Green of Common Sense Media gave Crater a grade of 3 out of 5 stars, complimented the presence of positive messages and role models, courage and perseverance across the characters, and praised the diverse representations.
