= Thanksgiving (2023 film) =

Film by Eli Roth

- Theatrical release poster
- Directed by: Eli Roth
- Screenplay by: Jeff Rendell
- Story by: Eli Roth; Jeff Rendell
- Based on: Thanksgiving by: Eli Roth; Jeff Rendell
- Produced by: Eli Roth; Roger Birnbaum; Jeff Rendell
- Starring: Patrick Dempsey; Addison Rae; Milo Manheim; Jalen Thomas Brooks; Nell Verlaque; Rick Hoffman; Gina Gershon
- Cinematography: Milan Chadima
- Edited by: Michele Conroy; Michel Aller
- Music by: Brandon Roberts
- Production companies: Spyglass Media Group; Dragonfly Entertainment; Electromagnetic Productions
- Distributed by: TriStar Pictures (through Sony Pictures Releasing)
- Release date: November 17, 2023
- Running time: 106 minutes
- Country: United States
- Language: English
- Budget: $15 million
- Box office: $46.6 million

Thanksgiving is a 2023 American slasher film directed by Eli Roth from a screenplay by Jeff Rendell, based on a story by the pair, who produced with Roger Birnbaum. It is based on a fictitious trailer from Grindhouse (2007). The film stars Patrick Dempsey, Addison Rae, Milo Manheim, Jalen Thomas Brooks, Nell Verlaque, Rick Hoffman, and Gina Gershon, and follows a small Massachusetts town that is terrorized by a killer in a John Carver mask around the Thanksgiving holiday one year after a Black Friday riot ended in tragedy.

Thanksgiving was released in the United States by TriStar Pictures (through Sony Pictures Releasing) on November 17, 2023. The film received generally positive reviews from critics and grossed $46.6 million worldwide against a production budget of $15 million. A sequel is currently in development.

== Plot ==
On Thanksgiving in Plymouth, Massachusetts, a mob gathers outside local superstore RightMart in preparation for a Black Friday sale. Jessica Wright, whose father Thomas owns the store, lets her boyfriend Bobby and friends Gaby, Evan, Scuba, and Yulia inside early. The crowd notices them and charges into the store in a frenzy. Three people are killed in the ensuing chaos: a customer, a security guard, and Amanda Collins, the wife of RightMart's manager Mitch. Bobby, whose arm was shattered amidst the chaos, moves away from Plymouth following the incident.

The following year, RightMart begins preparations for another Black Friday sale. When Bobby returns to Plymouth, a waitress named Lizzie is killed by a figure wearing a pilgrim hat and John Carver mask. Lizzie's actions in the RightMart incident played a role in Amanda's death, leading police to believe that those who were involved are being targeted.

The assailant, called "John Carver", tags Jessica and her friends in grisly social media posts. Jessica lends camera footage from the RightMart incident to the town's sheriff, Eric Newlon. Carver kills several more residents involved in the riot, including Manny, a security guard who fled during the rush and Lonnie, the student responsible for the stampede. Evan and Gaby are soon abducted while Yulia is attacked in her home. Jessica and Scuba make it to Yulia but are unable to stop Carver from disemboweling Yulia with a saw. The police attempt to lure Carver out by having the Wright family participate in the Thanksgiving parade. Carver, utilizing a different disguise, decapitates a mascot and sets off smoke bombs, causing chaos in which he is able to abduct Jessica, Scuba, Thomas, and Jessica's stepmother Kathleen.

Kathleen tries to escape but is captured and cooked alive at Carver's hideout. Her corpse is served as a "turkey" at a table where the hostages and victims' corpses are seated. Carver then bludgeons Evan to death in a livestream in front of the others. Jessica and Scuba escape from the table and Carver chases Jessica through the woods. She then comes upon Eric lying on the pavement and follows signs of movement into a building where parade float materials are being stored. She sees Bobby in the Carver costume, but Eric joins her and tells her to go outside. Gunshots are heard but Bobby is not found.

The police inform Jessica that her friends and father are safe. In the sheriff's office, Jessica notices the same debris from the woods that stuck to her clothing is also stuck to the hem of Eric's pants, which confirm that he is John Carver. When Jessica asks Eric why he committed this killing spree, he reveals his motive for the murders was revenge; Eric had been having an affair with Amanda, who was pregnant with his child when she was killed during the RightMart incident. Eric then began targeting those he held responsible for the riot, as their negligence and violence caused Amanda's death. Eric had also abducted Bobby and placed him in the Carver costume to frame him.

As Eric intends to poison Jessica to cover his tracks, Jessica reveals to a horrified Eric that she has live-streamed his confession, exposing him as the killer to the world. Eric attacks her, but Bobby intervenes. An enraged Eric attacks again, intent on killing Jessica for ruining his life. Jessica loads a blunderbuss using her mother's bracelet and shoots down a balloon attached to a tank of gas, causing an explosion that engulfs the sheriff.

Jessica reunites with Gaby and Scuba while Bobby is taken to the hospital. Authorities are unable to find Eric's body and believe he was incinerated in the blast. Reunited with her boyfriend Ryan, Jessica has a nightmare in which she is attacked by a flaming Eric.

== Cast ==
- Patrick Dempsey as Sheriff Eric Newlon
- Nell Verlaque as Jessica Wright
- Addison Rae as Gaby
- Jalen Thomas Brooks as Bobby
- Milo Manheim as Ryan
- Tomaso Sanelli as Evan
- Gabriel Davenport as Scuba
- Jenna Warren as Yulia
- Ty Victor Olsson as Mitch Collins
- Tim Dillon as Manny
- Russell Yuen as Detective Peter Chu
- Karen Cliche as Kathleen
- Derek McGrath as Mayor Cantin
- Joe Delfin as McCarty
- Jeff Teravainen as Deputy Bret Labelle
- Rick Hoffman as Thomas Wright
- Gina Gershon as Amanda Collins

Additionally, Jordan Poole plays Jacob, Mika Amonsen plays Lonnie, Shailyn Griffin plays Amy, Amanda Barker plays Lizzie, Chris Sandiford plays Doug, and Lynne Griffin plays Grandma. Adam MacDonald provides the voice of John Carver.

== Production ==
After director Eli Roth created the fake movie trailer, Thanksgiving, for the film Grindhouse (2007), plans for a feature-length adaptation began. In 2010, Roth told CinemaBlend that he was writing the script with Jeff Rendell and that he hoped to complete it once he was done with press for The Last Exorcism (2010). By August 2012, Jon Watts and Christopher D. Ford were set to write the screenplay with Roth and Rendell after they finished writing the Roth-produced Clown (2014). In June 2016, Roth revealed on Reddit that the script still needed work in order for the film to live up to the trailer.

In January 2023, Deadline Hollywood reported that Spyglass Media Group, which owns The Weinstein Company library, was producing the film. Roth would depart from Borderlands (2024), passing additional photography off to Tim Miller, in order to direct the film. The following month, Patrick Dempsey and Addison Rae joined the cast. Also cast were Jalen Thomas Brooks, Nell Verlaque, and Milo Manheim. In March 2023, Rick Hoffman, Gina Gershon, Tim Dillon, Gabriel Davenport, Tomaso Sanelli, and Jenna Warren joined the cast. Principal photography took place in Toronto and Hamilton, Ontario, from March 13 to May 5, 2023.

== Release ==
In March 2023, TriStar Pictures acquired the distribution rights to the film. Thanksgiving was released in the United States on November 17, 2023. The film was released in India as Bloody Thanksgiving. It was released on digital platforms on December 19, 2023, followed by a Blu-ray and DVD release on January 30, 2024. The film began streaming on Netflix on February 17, 2024.

== Reception ==
=== Box office ===
Thanksgiving grossed $31.9 million in the United States and Canada, and $14.6 million in other territories, for a worldwide total of $46.6 million.

In the United States and Canada, Thanksgiving was released alongside Next Goal Wins, Trolls Band Together, and The Hunger Games: The Ballad of Songbirds & Snakes, and was projected to gross $12–15 million from 3,204 theaters in its opening weekend. The film made $3.8 million on its first day, including $1 million from Thursday night previews. It went on to debut to $10.4 million, finishing fourth at the box office. The film made $7.2 million in its second weekend (a drop of 31%), finishing in fifth. It then made $2.6 million in its third weekend. The film was re-released in 511 theaters in the United States on the last weekend of January 2024.

=== Critical response ===
On the review aggregator website Rotten Tomatoes, 83% of 150 critics' reviews are positive, with an average rating of 6.8/10. The website's consensus reads: "Combining belly-busting humor with delightfully over-the-top gore, Thanksgiving is a feast for grindhouse fans." Metacritic, which uses a weighted average, assigned the film a score of 63 out of 100, based on 34 critics, indicating "generally favorable" reviews. Audiences polled by CinemaScore gave the film an average grade of "B−" on an A+ to F scale, while those polled by PostTrak gave it a 73% overall positive score.

Owen Gleiberman of Variety wrote "Thanksgiving follows the rules of the slasher genre, but it's got a more charged and entertainingly hyperbolic atmosphere than these movies used to have". Frank Scheck ended his positive review saying, "There are times you can feel Thanksgiving straining too mightily for a cult status it's not likely to achieve. But it seems a safe bet the film will be trotted out like a turkey on cable channels and streaming services for many Thanksgivings to come". The San Francisco Chronicle's G. Allen Johnson gave the film a score of one out of four and wrote, "Thanksgiving could have been a great horror movie. Instead, it's one of those where if you've seen the trailer, you've seen the film".

== Sequel ==
In November 2023, Roth announced on his Instagram page that a sequel, Thanksgiving 2, had been greenlit for a 2025 release. Two months later, Verlaque and Hoffman said that they believed they would return for a sequel. In August 2024, Roth stated he and co-writer Jeff Rendell were "about to hand" the final script to the studio, and that Rae was expected to return as Gaby. However, in January 2026, Roth said production of the sequel was postponed due to Rae and Manheim's respective commitments to other projects.

== See also ==
- List of holiday horror films
