= Nell Verlaque =

American actress

- Born: October 19, 2000 (age 26); New York City, New York, U.S.
- Occupation: Actress
- Years active: 2017–present

Nell Verlaque (born October 19, 2000) is an American actress and singer. She starred as Louise Gruzinsky in the David E Kelley sports comedy-drama television series Big Shot (2021–2022) and as Jessica Wright in the slasher film Thanksgiving.

== Biography ==
Verlaque was born in New York City. She grew up on the Upper West Side of Manhattan and attended Fiorello H. LaGuardia High School before studying drama at University of North Carolina School of the Arts. She left after a year to pursue acting full-time.

Verlaque made her screen debut as a guest on the CBS legal drama Bull in 2017 before landing her first main role as Louise Gruzinsky (Fake Jordan signature move girl) on the Disney+ series Big Shot for two seasons. She then landed the lead role in the Eli Roth film Thanksgiving which she received positive reviews for and is expected to return for the sequel. Verlaque appeared on the new A24 Amazon Prime Video comedy drama Overcompensating in a recurring role. The show, which has a 93% approval rating on Rotten Tomatoes has garnered Verlaque more attention and solidified her as a rising star and one to watch. She will next star opposite Kevin Kline and Laura Linney in the new Amazon MGM series American Classic.

As a singer-songwriter Verlaque has written, produced, and independently released five songs since 2022. She self-directed the accompanying music videos and has said she hopes to direct films in the future.

== Filmography ==
=== Film ===
| Year | Title | Role | Notes |
|---|---|---|---|
| 2018 | Frankie Boy | Julie | Short film |
| 2020 | The Marijuana Conspiracy | Becky Harlow | |
| 2023 | Thanksgiving | Jessica Wright | |
| 2024 | Notice to Quit | Haley | |
| 2026 | Vampire Carnival | Gemma | |
| TBA | Thanksgiving 2 | Jessica Wright | Pre-production |

=== Television ===
| Year | Title | Role | Notes |
|---|---|---|---|
| 2017 | Bull | Emily Connor | Episode: "Already Gone" |
| 2019 | Secrets in a Small Town | Sarah Porter | TV Movie |
| 2021–2022 | Big Shot | Louise Gruzinsky | Main role |
| 2025 | Overcompensating | Emily | Recurring role |
| 2026 | American Classic | Miranda Bean | Main role |
