= Kyle Patrick Alvarez =

American film director and screenwriter (born 1983)

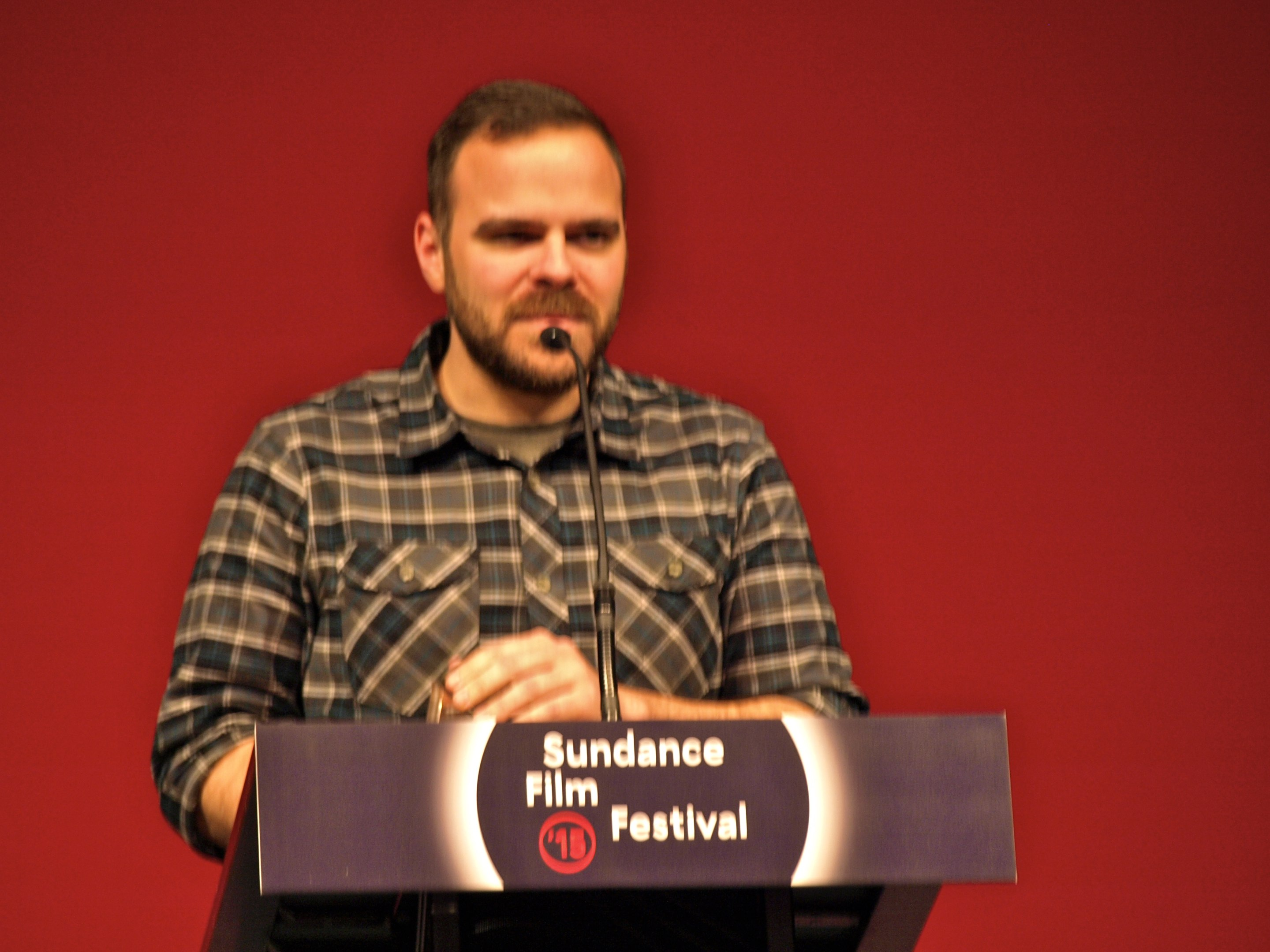
Alvarez at the 2015 Sundance Film Festival

Kyle Patrick Alvarez (born 1983) is an American filmmaker and producer. He is known for directing the film The Stanford Prison Experiment (2015) and has worked as a director and producer for television.

== Early life and education ==
Alvarez was born in Miami, and attended the University of Miami.

== Career ==
His first film, Easier with Practice, was based on a GQ article by Davy Rothbart. Alvarez then adapted a short story by David Sedaris into the film C.O.G., which premiered at the 2013 Sundance Film Festival, and was released later that year.

Alvarez's third film, The Stanford Prison Experiment, a thriller dramatizing the 1971 experiment of the same name, premiered at the 2015 Sundance Film Festival, where it received the Alfred P. Sloan Prize. It received positive reviews and was distributed by IFC Films. Alvarez has also directed four episodes of the Netflix series 13 Reasons Why.

Alvarez directed the second season of the Amazon series Homecoming which premiered on May 22, 2020.

== Personal life ==
Alvarez lives in Los Angeles. He is gay.

== Filmography ==
Year	Title	Director	Writer	Producer	Ref(s)
2009	Easier with Practice	Yes	Yes	Yes	
2013	C.O.G.	Yes	Yes	Yes	
2015	The Stanford Prison Experiment	Yes	No	No	
2023	Crater	Yes	No	No	

Television directed

Year	Title	Episodes	Ref(s)
2017	13 Reasons Why	"Tape 3, Side A"	
2017	13 Reasons Why	"Tape 3, Side B"	
2017	13 Reasons Why	"Tape 7, Side A"	
2018	13 Reasons Why	"Bye"	
2018	Counterpart	"Outside In"	
2018	Counterpart	"Something Borrowed"	
2019	Tales of the City	"Three of Cups"	
2020	Homecoming	All season 2 episodes	
