= Judith Viorst =

American writer

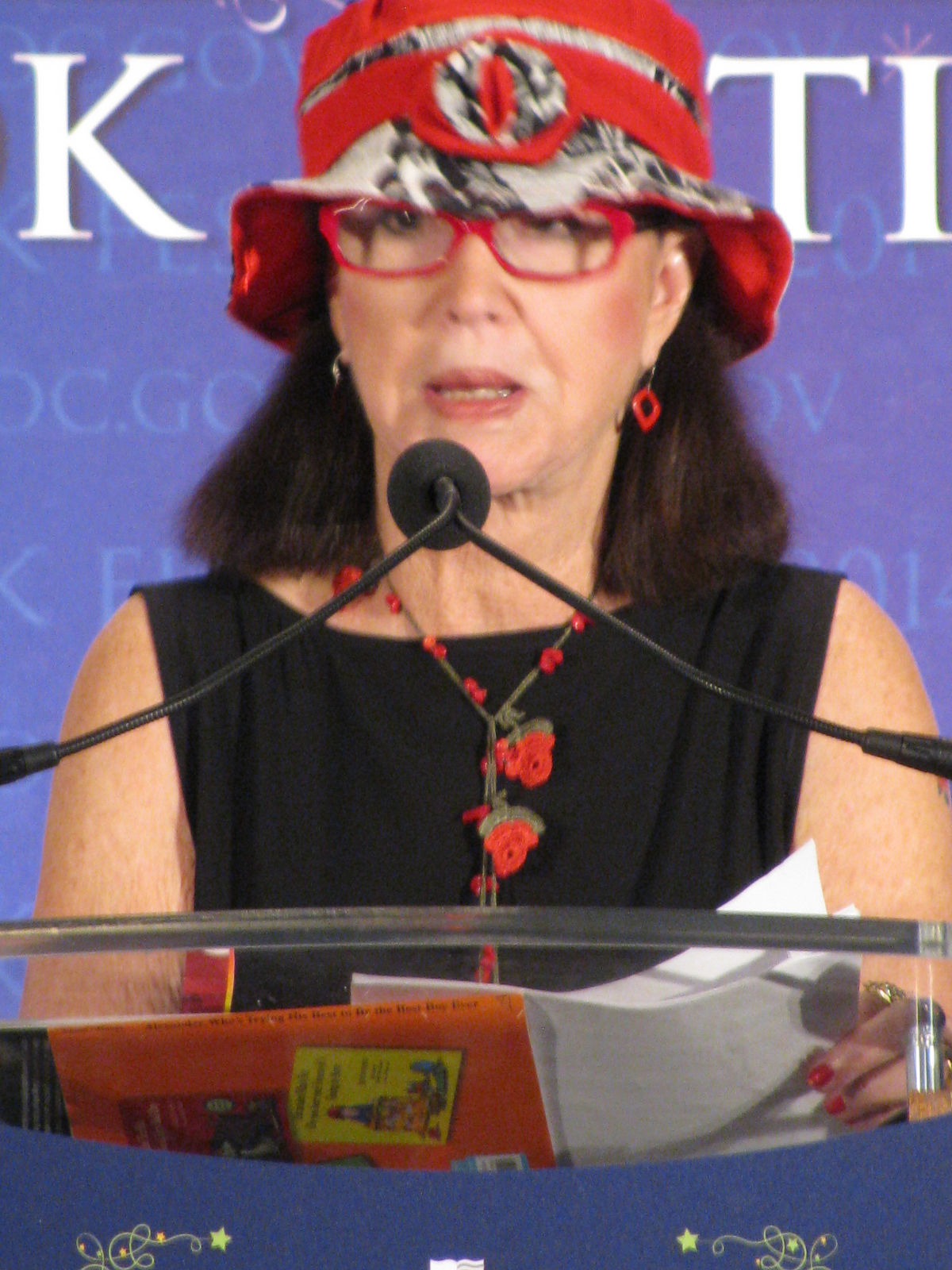
- Viorst in 2014
- Born: Judith Stahl; February 2, 1931 (age 95); Newark, New Jersey, U.S.
- Education: Rutgers University
- Spouse: Milton Viorst
- Children: 3
- Writing career
- Notable works: Alexander and the Terrible, Horrible, No Good, Very Bad Day; The Tenth Good Thing About Barney
- Notable awards: 2011 Foremother Award

Judith Viorst (/viˈɔːrst/ vee-ORST; née Stahl; born February 2, 1931) is an American writer. She has been called "housewife's poet laureate" for her humorous books of observational poetry, and is known for her popular children's books such as The Tenth Good Thing About Barney (1971) and Alexander and the Terrible, Horrible, No Good, Very Bad Day (1972), which has sold more than four million copies.

In the latter part of the 1970s, after two decades of writing for children and adults, Viorst turned to the study of Freudian psychology. In 1981, she became a research graduate at Washington Psychoanalytic Institute after six years of study.

== Early life and career ==
Judith Viorst was raised in a Jewish family in Maplewood, New Jersey. She graduated in the class of 1948 from Columbia High School, where she returned in 1990 to be inducted into the school's hall of fame. She studied history at Rutgers University in Newark, New Jersey, where she met her future husband Milton Viorst and was a member of Phi Beta Kappa. She graduated in 1952 and moved to the Greenwich Village neighborhood of Manhattan, where she lived for eight years. She was hired by the New York Herald Tribune.

Viorst married the political journalist Milton Viorst, and they moved to Washington D. C. where she worked as an editor at Science Service, a non-profit and publisher. In the role she published several children's books about science, starting with her first assignment to write about the NASA space program: "I remember coming home sobbing to Milton, saying, 'I've finally gotten a chance to write a book and they want me to write about space, and I don't even know where space is!' And spoken like a true reporter, he said, 'Say yes — we'll figure out where space is.'" Though she has written poetry since she was a child, she has said "If it wasn't for Milton, I probably wouldn't have written anything for publication."

Viorst wrote a column about family and children for more than 25 years in Redbook magazine, where she was a contributing editor. She later had a column in The Washington Star. She published freelance writing in outlets such as The New York Times and The Washington Post.

== Books ==
=== Children's literature ===
Viorst continued to write children's books in addition to her columns. She published I'll Fix Anthony illus. Arnold Lobel (1969) and Try It Again, Sam illus. Paul Galdone (1969) before getting her big break with Alexander and the Terrible, Horrible, No Good, Very Bad Day (1972), a bestselling picture book about a young narrator, Alexander, who faces a day full of misfortune from morning to night. In the story he fantasizes about going to Australia because, as Viorst has explained in interviews, "Australia is the opposite of everything bad. It’s the other side of the world." She based the character on her youngest son, Alexander, a "world-class klutz" who "had more than his share of bad days", she said. "You know, climbing up trees fifteen minutes before going to Europe, and breaking his wrist." He "was really annoyed" by the book. To his dismay the characters Anthony and Nick, who were based on his big brothers of the same names, did not suffer a bad day. "But he got over that", Viorst said. She believes his change of heart was because the book brought him attention from women during his bachelor years.

Viorst has drawn inspiration from her sons in other books, writing The Tenth Good Thing About Barney (1971) about the death of a beloved cat after her son Anthony asked, "Mommy, am I going to die someday?" Her children's books includes three additional books to make up the "Alexander" series, as well as poetry collections such as Sad Underwear (1995), and many other miscellaneous books.

=== Psychology books ===
Viorst's books for adults include nine nonfiction psychology books, including People and Other Aggravations (1971) and Grown-up Marriage (2003). These books incorporate Freudian themes and teachings of psychoanalytic theory, which Viorst studied in the late 1970s through 1981. In 1986, she wrote an internationally best-selling book about the inevitable pain of the human experience, called Necessary Losses: The Loves, Illusions, Dependencies and Impossible Expectations that All of Us Have to Give Up in Order to Grow.

=== Humorous poetry ===
Through her professional life, Viorst has published poetry in addition to her other writing endeavors. Described as "breezy, irreverent", her poems were regularly published in New York magazine by editor Clay Felker, who received complaints from readers when there had not been on of Viorst's poems in a while. Felker said that the first time he published one of her poems, "a tidal wave of approval washed into the magazine. She really hit the readers between the eyes." Viorst has published at least nine humorous verse collections, most of which are commendary on aging. Viorst points out that her poetry deals with different subject matter than that of her favorite writers such as W. H. Auden, Emily Dickinson, and T. S. Eliot: "I decided somebody has to write about Metamucil and saggy kneecaps, so why not me." These books of verse include When Did I Stop Being 20 (1987), Hard to be Hip Over 30 (1968), How Did I Get to be 40 (1976), Forever 50 (1989), Suddenly 60 (2000), I'm Too Young to be 70 (2005), Unexpectedly 80 (2010), Nearing 90 (2019), and Making the Best of What's Left (2025). Viorst was celebrated for the wit and honesty about life as a working mother in much of her work, such as a poem called "The Writers":

I write in the bedroom with unsorted laundry,
a crib and a babby who hollers.
My husband the writer getrs gold velvet chairs,
a couch that cost four hundred dollars.

=== Miscellaneous ===
Viorst adapted the Alexander books into a musical for the Kennedy Center. She co-wrote a musical with Shelly Markam called Love & Shrimp, which was performed by the Ensemble Theatre of Cincinnati in 1999.

She studied psychoanalytic psychology at the Washington Psychoanalytic Institute for six years, finishing in 1981. She then became a writing instructor at the program, teaching the training psychoanalysts to avoid jargon and write like normal people.

== Writing philosophy and recognition ==
"I don’t think I’ve written about anything funny that I haven’t cried over first," she said in 2025. "I don’t think that anybody has ever accused me of being optimistic before. I’m honored. I get to positive by a very long, circuitous route, which involves a lot of crying and blaming and hollering. Eventually I see the humor of what once seemed to be the end of the world. But it takes a little time."

In 1968, Viorst signed the "Writers and Editors War Tax Protest" pledge, vowing to refuse tax payments in protest against the Vietnam War.

She received the 2011 Foremother Award for Lifetime Achievement from the National Research Center for Women & Families.

== Personal life ==
Judith and her husband Milton Viorst, a successful political journalist known for his coverage of the Middle East, have three sons and seven grandchildren. According to Viorst, "We both wanted a family in a very big way. I think on our first date, before we had even said hello, we said, 'Do you want children?' Because we weren’t going to waste time on somebody who didn’t want children." The family lived in Washington D. C. in their beloved 100-year-old house, which was very colorful and covered in family photos.

She was a member of a book club for novels, and an eight-woman poetry reading group. Her favorite books include The World as I Found It by Bruce Duffy and Gabriel García Marquez stories. She has called herself "a totally disciplined person", and has explained, "If I have a deadline in three years, I divide up the work by the year, by the month, by the week."

Though Viorst repeatedly expressed that she never wanted to leave their family home, she and Milton moved into a nearby nursing home due to old age. In 2022, after nearly 63 years of marriage, Milton died of COVID-19. Viorst said in an interview with The Washington Post that their marriage was represented by the song "Thanks for the Memory" and its lyric, "You may have been a headache, but you never were a bore."

== Selected works ==
- The Wonderful World of Science, edited by Shirley Moore and Viorst (Bantam Books, 1961) — science experiments and recreations
- Projects: Space (Washington Square Books, 1962)
- 150 Science Experiments Step-by-step, illus. Dennis Telesford (Bantam, 1963)
- The Natural World: A guide to North American wildlife (Bantam, 1965)
- The Village Square, illus. Tom Ballenger (Coward-McCann, 1966)
- The Changing Earth, illus. Feodor Rimsky (Bantam, 1967)
- Sunday Morning: a story, illus. Hilary Knight (Harper & Row, 1968)

=== For children ===
- I'll Fix Anthony, illus. Arnold Lobel (1969), Harper & Row, ISBN 0-06-026306-7
- Try It Again, Sam: Safety When You Walk, illus. Paul Galdone (1970)
- My Mama Says there Aren't any Zombies, Ghosts, Vampires, Creatures, Demons, Monsters, Fiends, Goblins, or Things, illus. Kay Chorao (1973)
- The Tenth Good Thing About Barney, illus. Erik Blegvad (1987)
- The Good-bye Book, illus. Kay Chorao (1988)
- Super-Completely and Totally the Messiest, illus. Robin Preiss Glasser (2001)
- Just in Case, illus. Diana Cain Bluthenthal (2006)
- And Two Boys Booed, illus. Sophie Blackall (2014)

==== Poems for Children and Their Parents ====
- If I Were in Charge of the World and Other Worries: Poems for Children and their Parents, illus. Lynne Cherry (1981)
- Sad Underwear and Other Complications: More Poems for Children and Their Parents, illus. Richard Hull (1995)

==== Alexander ====
- Alexander and the Terrible, Horrible, No Good, Very Bad Day, illustrated by Ray Cruz (1972), New York: Atheneum Books, ISBN 0-689-70428-3
- Alexander, Who Used to be Rich Last Sunday illus. Ray Cruz (1977), Atheneum, ISBN 978-0-689-30602-0
- Alexander, Who Is Not (Do You Hear Me? I Mean It!) Going to Move illus. Robin Preiss Glasser "in the style of Ray Cruz" (1995), Atheneum, ISBN 0-689-31958-4
- Alexander, Who's Trying His Best to Be the Best Boy Ever illus. Isidre Monés "in the style of Ray Cruz" (2014), Atheneum, ISBN 978-1-48142353-3

Omnibus edition: Absolutely, Positively Alexander: The Complete Stories

Alexander-related works

- Alexander and the Terrible, Horrible, No Good, Very Bad Day: A Musical
- Alexander and the Wonderful, Marvelous, Excellent, Terrific Ninety Days: An Almost Completely Honest Account of What Happened to Our Family When Our Youngest came to Live with Us for Three Months (2007) — an adult memoir of Judith Viorst and her real son, Alexander

==== Lulu ====
- Lulu and the Brontosaurus, illus. Lane Smith (2010), Atheneum, ISBN 978-1-4169-9961-4
- Lulu Walks the Dogs, illus. Lane Smith (2012), Atheneum, ISBN 978-1-4424-3579-7
- Lulu's Mysterious Mission, illus. Kevin Cornell (2014), Atheneum, ISBN 978-1-4424-9746-7
- Lulu Is Getting a Sister, illus. Kevin Cornell (2018), Atheneum, ISBN 9781481471909

=== For adults ===
- People and Other Aggravations (1971)
- Yes, Married: A Saga of Love and Complaint (1972)
- A Visit from St. Nicholas to a Liberated Household illustrated by Norman Green (1977)
- Love and Guilt and the Meaning of Life, Etc. illustrated by John Alcorn (1979)
- Necessary Losses: The Loves, Illusions, Dependencies, and Impossible Expectations That All of Us Have to Give Up in Order to Grow (1987)
- Murdering Mr. Monti: A Merry Little Tale of Sex and Violence (1994)
- Imperfect Control: Our Lifelong Struggles With Power and Surrender (1998)
- You're Officially a Grown-up: The Graduate's Guide to Freedom, Responsibility, Happiness, and Personal Hygiene (1999)
- Grown-Up Marriage: What We Know, Wish We Had Known, and Still Need to Know About Being Married (2003)

==== Age-related poetry series ====
- When Did I Stop Being 20 & Other Injustices: Selected Poems from Single to Mid-Life, illus. John Alcorn (1987)
- It's Hard to Be Hip Over 30 & Other Tragedies of Married Life (1968), New York: World Publ. Co.; reprinted by Persephone Books, 1999
- How Did I Get to Be 40 & Other Atrocities illus. John Alcorn (1976)
- Forever 50 & Other Negotiations, illus. John Alcorn (1989)
- Suddenly 60 & Other Shocks of Later Life, illus. Laurie Rosewald (2000)
- I'm Too Young to Be 70 & Other Delusions, illustrated by Laura Gibson (2005)
- Unexpectedly 80 & Other Adaptations, illus. Laura Gibson (2010)
- Nearing 90 And Other Comedies of Late Life, illus. Laura Gibson (2019)
- Making the Best of What's Left: When We're Too Old to Get the Chairs Reupholstered (2025)

== Dramatic adaptations ==
- Alexander and the Terrible, Horrible, No Good, Very Bad Day, a stage adaptation of the book, was performed at the B Street Theatre in 2004.
- Alexander and the Terrible, Horrible, No Good, Very Bad Day, live-action film by Walt Disney Pictures, 2014. http://movies.disney.com/alexander-and-the-terrible-horrible-no-good-very-bad-day/
