= Anthony Alabi =

American football player and actor (born 1981)

No. 79, 73
- Position: Offensive tackle

Personal information
- Born: February 16, 1981 (age 45); San Antonio, Texas, U.S.
- Listed height: 6 ft 5 in (1.96 m)
- Listed weight: 315 lb (143 kg)

Career information
- High school: Castle Hills (TX) Antonian
- College: Texas Christian
- NFL draft: 2005: 5th round, 162nd overall pick

Career history
- Miami Dolphins (2005–2007); Kansas City Chiefs (2008)*; Tampa Bay Buccaneers (2009)*
- * Offseason or practice squad member only

Awards and highlights
- 2× first-team All-Conference USA (2003–2004)

Career NFL statistics
- Games played: 16
- Stats at Pro Football Reference

Anthony Abayomi Alabi (/əˈlɑːbi/; born February 16, 1981) is an American actor and former professional football offensive tackle. He was selected by the Miami Dolphins in the fifth round of the 2005 NFL draft. He played college football at TCU.

Alabi was also a member of the Kansas City Chiefs and Tampa Bay Buccaneers.

Since 2010, Alabi has been acting. His most recent role is in the Netflix series Family Reunion.

== Early life ==
Alabi attended Antonian College Preparatory High School in San Antonio, where he was a four-year letterman in football, and also lettered in basketball and track and field (shot put and discus). He earned all-district and all-state honors in football and led the team in sacks (13) and tackles (82) as a senior. He was a two-time state champion in track. Alabi was inducted in the 2013–14 Antonian Athletics Hall of Fame class.

== College career ==
Alabi attended the United States Naval Academy for a short time in 1999 before heading to Texas Christian University (TCU), where he was a four-year letterman, starting his final three seasons and making 35 career starts in college. He was a defensive lineman before moving to the offensive line during his redshirt season in 2000. He started all 12 games at left tackle as a sophomore, as TCU led the Conference USA by averaging 203.2 yards rushing per outing. As a junior, he was part of a line that paved the way for an offense that averaged more than 200 net rushing yards and 200 net passing yards per game – one of only six Division I schools to accomplish that feat. In his senior season, the offense averaged 32.9 points per game. He earned first-team All-Conference USA accolades each of his final two years, during which time he opened a combined 23 games.

== Professional career ==
Pre-draft measurables
Height	Weight	Arm length	Hand span	40-yard dash	10-yard split	20-yard split	20-yard shuttle	Three-cone drill	Vertical jump	Broad jump	Bench press
6 ft 5 1/8 in (1.96 m)	310 lb (141 kg)	36 3/4 in (0.93 m)	10 3/8 in (0.26 m)	5.23 s	1.88 s	3.08 s	4.60 s	7.62 s	32.5 in (0.83 m)	8 ft 9 in (2.67 m)	18 reps
All values from NFL Combine

=== Miami Dolphins ===
Alabi was selected by the Miami Dolphins in the fifth round (162nd overall) of the 2005 NFL draft by former head coach Nick Saban. The pick used to select him was acquired from the Kansas City Chiefs in the deal that sent cornerback Patrick Surtain to the Chiefs. On July 22, the Dolphins signed Alabi to a four-year contract that included a signing bonus of $158,000.

Alabi was tried at left tackle during training camp, and shortly after returning to practice from an ankle injury he was shifted to right tackle. He played in a reserve role during the team's five preseason games, and was inactive for all 16 regular season contests. He nursed an elbow injury during November which caused him to miss practice time.

Alabi saw his first regular season action in 2006, playing in six games during the year. He made his NFL debut in a reserve role on October 1 at the Houston Texans. He also saw extensive action on December 17 at the Buffalo Bills following injury to Damion McIntosh.

On February 11, Alabi was one of nine players let go by the Dolphins.

=== Kansas City Chiefs ===
On February 13, just two days after being waived by the Dolphins, Alabi was claimed by the Kansas City Chiefs. Alabi was released by the Chiefs on August 30, 2008.

=== Tampa Bay Buccaneers ===
After spending the 2008 regular season out of football, Alabi was signed to a reserve/future contract by the Tampa Bay Buccaneers on January 6, 2009.

Alabi was released by the Buccaneers on September 5, 2009.

== Acting career ==
Alabi retired from the NFL in 2009 to pursue a career in acting. He is a series lead in Family Reunion, a Netflix original series also starring Loretta Devine, Tia Mowry, and Richard Roundtree, which released in July 2019. He also has recurring roles in Raven's Home and Bosch as well as guest star roles in Malibu Rescue, Shameless, and Insecure. He also played Guldan in the Hearthstone "Mulligans" web series by Blizzard Entertainment.

== Filmography ==
=== Television ===
Year	Title	Role	Notes
2012	How to Rock	Bouncer	1 episode
2012	Raising Hope	Don, the Director	1 episode
2012	Big Time Rush	Baby Sitter	1 episode
2012	Rizzoli & Isles	Enzo 'End Zone' Womack	1 episode
2013	In the Dark	Bob	Television film
2013	Touch	Gate Guard	1 episode
2014	The Haunted Hathaways	Lorenzo	1 episode
2014	Revenge	Officer Rinella	1 episode
2014	Video Game High School	Bouncer	1 episode
2015	Bosch	Antoine Jasper	2 episodes
2015	The Soul Man	Jasper	1 episode
2015	I Didn't Do It	Chester	1 episode
2015	Modern Family	Buddy	1 episode
2015	RocketJump: The Show	John Military / Truck Flipper	2 episodes
2016	Pee-wee's Big Holiday	Lane	Netflix film
2016	Heartbeat	Dr. Adisa Okonjo	1 episode
2016	Maron	Tom	1 episode
2016	Diva Diaries	Bobby	Television film
2016	Rush Hour	Guard	1 episode
2016	Longmire	Randal Horen	1 episode
2016	Insecure	Terrence	1 episode
2017	Dimension 404	Guard #2	1 episode
2017	The Mick	Officer Strassner	1 episode
2017	NCIS	Christopher Clayton	1 episode
2017–2020	Raven's Home	Coach Spitz	Recurring role, 7 episodes
2019	Malibu Rescue	Derek Mitchell	1 episode
2019	Shameless	MaVar	2 episodes
2019–2022	Family Reunion	Moses "Moz" McKellan	Main role
2020	Black-ish	Lewis	1 episode

=== Video games ===
Year	Title	Role	Notes
2021	Guilty Gear Strive	Colin Vernon	
2023	Dead Space	Zach Hammond	

== Personal life ==
Alabi's father is from Nigeria and his mother is from Puerto Rico. He is a first cousin of Houston Texans defensive end N. D. Kalu.

He earned a Bachelor of Science degree in criminal justice with a minor in business at Texas Christian and later, while in the NFL, a Master of Liberal Arts with a criminology focus.

Alabi is married to Caroline, a Pilates instructor. They have two children.
