= Alexander and the Terrible, Horrible, No Good, Very Bad Day =

1972 picture book by Judith Viorst

- Author: Judith Viorst
- Illustrator: Ray Cruz
- Language: English
- Genre: Children's
- Publisher: Atheneum Books
- Publication date: June 16, 1972
- Publication place: United States
- Pages: 32
- ISBN: 0-689-30072-7

Alexander and the Terrible, Horrible, No Good, Very Bad Day is a 1972 ALA Notable Children's Book written by Judith Viorst and illustrated by Ray Cruz.

The book has won a George G. Stone Center Recognition of Merit, a Georgia Children's Book Award, and has been featured in the PBS series Reading Rainbow. Viorst followed this book up with three sequels: Alexander, Who Used to be Rich Last Sunday, Alexander, Who's Not (Do You Hear Me? I Mean It!) Going to Move, and Alexander, Who's Trying His Best to Be the Best Boy Ever.

== Plot ==
A young boy named Alexander endures a string of misfortunes throughout his day, starting when he wakes up with gum in his hair. His older brothers find prizes in their cereal boxes, but not Alexander. In the carpool on the way to school, Alexander complains about not getting a window seat. At school, Alexander faces criticism from his teacher Miss Dickens, his best friend Paul replaces him by two other friends, and he finds that his mother did not put a dessert in his lunch bag.

After school, a dentist's appointment reveals a cavity in Alexander's mouth. At the shoe store, Alexander is forced to buy plain white sneakers. When the family goes to pick up Alexander's father from his office, Alexander's restless behavior makes the father request not to be picked up anymore. Back at home, Alexander's evening goes wrong when he is served lima beans for dinner, watches kissing on TV, he takes a hot bath, and is made to sleep in train-themed pajamas, all of which he hates.

A running gag in the story is Alexander's desire to escape his troubles by moving to Australia. His mother tells him that everybody has bad days, regardless of where they live.

== TV adaptation ==
On September 15, 1990, the book was adapted into a 29-minute animated musical television special that was produced by Klasky Csupo and aired on HBO in the United States. While the special is generally true to the book, there are several alterations to the designs of the main and supporting characters, the cat's name is Timothy, and new plot elements, most notably Alexander searching for his lost yo-yo throughout. The special also included three original songs:

- "So much to do, so little time in the morning"
- "If I could be the only child"
- "I've had a terrible, horrible, no good, very bad day"

=== Cast ===
- Danny Tamberelli as Alexander (speaking voice)
  - Todd Defreitas as Alexander (singing voice)
- Joey Rigol as Nick
- Devon Michaels as Anthony
- Linda Wallem as Mom
- Steve Barton as Dad
- Stephanie Maddin as Mrs. Dickens
- William Bogert as Dr. Fields
- Skip Hinnant as Shoe Salesman
- Ashley Carin as Girl #1
- Erin Torpey as Girl #2
- Buddy Smith as Paul
- Daniel Riefsnyder as Phillip Parker
- Z. Wright as Albert Boyo

== Other media ==
In 1998, Viorst and the Kennedy Center joined together to turn the book into a musical production. Charles Strouse wrote the music, Viorst wrote the script and lyrics, and the musical score was composed by Shelly Markham. The productions have been performed around the country.

Other characters in it are Audrey, Becky, and many others.

In 2004, a stage adaptation was run at the B Street Theatre.

In 2014, Disney produced a film based on the book.

== Characters ==
Alexander and his two older brothers, Anthony and Nick, are based on Viorst's own three sons of the same names. However, the film changed Nick to Emily, replacing the brother with a sister, and adds Trevor as well.

== Cultural references ==
The phrase "terrible, horrible, no good, very bad . . ." has become an Internet meme, often used by bloggers, and sometimes by mainstream media, to criticize, or characterize setbacks for, an individual or political movement.
