= Bird Box =

A bird box is a man-made enclosure, also called a birdhouse or a nest box, provided for birds or other animals to nest in.

Bird Box may also refer to:

- Bird Box (novel), a 2014 post-apocalyptic novel and the debut novel by American writer and singer Josh Malerman
  - Bird Box (film), a 2018 film directed by Susanne Bier, based on the novel
    - Bird Box Barcelona, a 2023 Spanish spin-off sequel released on Netflix
- "Bird Box", a 2019 song by American rapper Cupcakke

== See also ==
- Singing bird box, a kind of music box
