= 47 Ronin (soundtrack) =

2013 film soundtrack album

47 Ronin (Original Motion Picture Soundtrack)

Film score by Ilan Eshkeri
- Released: December 17, 2013
- Recorded: 2013
- Venues: London; Portland, Oregon
- Studios: AIR Studios; Abbey Road Studios; British Grove Studios; Northpole Studio
- Genre: Film score
- Length: 70:38
- Label: Varèse Sarabande
- Producers: Steve McLaughlin; Teese Gohl

Ilan Eshkeri chronology
Justin and the Knights of Valour (2013)	47 Ronin (2013)	The Invisible Woman (2014)

47 Ronin (Original Motion Picture Soundtrack) is the film score composed by Ilan Eshkeri to the 2013 film 47 Ronin directed by Carl Rinsch starring Keanu Reeves, Hiroyuki Sanada, Tadanobu Asano, Rinko Kikuchi and Ko Shibasaki. The original score is composed by Ilan Eshkeri and released under the Varèse Sarabande record label on December 17, 2013.

== Background ==
The film was initially set to be scored by Atticus Ross in April 2012, and later Javier Navarrete eventually replaced him that November. The following June, it was announced that Ilan Eshkeri would take over the scoring duties from Navarette. Eshkeri told that his aikido training during his 20s, led him to an ongoing interest in the Japanese culture that dwelled his fascination for Samurai films, and also noted that forty-seven rōnin battle was told in a Hollywood style fantasy epic version of the modified Japanese setting and naturally needed some Japanese elements to evoke the onscreen atmosphere but underpinned by a Hollywood fantasy score. Rinsch noted that he was inspired by the music of Radiohead and Björk which provided a contemporary element.

Eshkeri felt that since the number 47 was much important in the film, he tried to weave the numerological significance into the fabric of the score. The first two notes of the Ronin theme are the fourth and seventh above the root, along with the fourth chord followed by the seventh chord to become a repeated motif when a character commits seppuku. The romantic theme for Kai and Mika is a duet for shakuhachi (played by Joji Hirota) and solo cello which is performed with an orange or a tennis ball in the left hand by cellist Caroline Dale to not only provide a swooping Asian sound but to affect the tone of the cello. The same theme reprised with a full orchestra in the end as Mika stands on bridge, which Eshkeri liked it. For the action music, Eshkeri used multiple taiko drums, along with a bass drum and an epic Verdi bass drum. Those drums were kept quite simplistic in some of the action sequences as in the kirin hunt, there were so many galloping sound effects from the Kirin's hoofs and the horse hoofs for which using complex percussions fighting the effects might sound confusing. Eshkeri felt high pitch drums were never an option as they do not associate these instruments with that setting.

Eshkeri worked with a koto player Keiko Kitamura and flautist Emi Watanabe whose expertise in Japanese folk music guided the composer. He further added there was very little traditional Japanese music in the score and needed to subtle with it to evoke enough of the atmopshere. For the black magic approach that the antagonists wielded in the film, Eshkeri wanted to play the witch with female vocals, which a strange long descending melody sometimes over a pedal tone and sometimes with a series of chords when it needed to be more dramatic. Eshkeri wanted to evoke the witch's transformations with the choir and was further interested with the idea of pivoting around an axis note to its retrograde inversion through multiple glissandos, which would lead to some voices sliding more, or sliding a little through one note. Eshkeri considered the score to be contemporary especially in its use of low-end weighted strings, large brass, trumpets, woodwinds, and percussion, while also adding more electronics to bring the old school Hollywood traditional scoring, which Eshkeri had liked it.

== Release ==
Varèse Sarabande released the soundtrack on December 17, 2013, through digital and physical formats.

== Reception ==
Pete Simons of Synchrotones considered it to be "pretty bloody impressive at the best of times, let alone for an 11th hour replacement." James Croot of Stuff called it an "overly bombastic score". David Rooney of The Hollywood Reporter wrote "A lack of faith in the material is suggested by the relentless use of Ilan Eshkeri's tumescent symphonic score."

== Track listing ==
No.	Title	Length
1.	"Oishi's Tale"	6:44
2.	"Kirin Hunt"	3:03
3.	"Resentment"	1:41
4.	"The Witch's Plan"	2:29
5.	"Ako"	2:13
6.	"Shogun"	2:10
7.	"Tournament"	3:45
8.	"Bewitched"	3:36
9.	"Assano Seppuku"	2:41
10.	"Dutch Island Fugue"	2:05
11.	"Reunited Ronin"	3:11
12.	"Tengu"	6:29
13.	"Shrine Ambush"	2:11
14.	"The Witch's Lie"	3:19
15.	"Kira's Wedding Quartet"	4:32
16.	"Palace Battle"	3:11
17.	"The Witch Dragon"	3:37
18.	"Return To Ako"	2:24
19.	"Shogun's Sentence"	2:02
20.	"Mika And Kai"	2:47
21.	"Seppuku"	3:45
22.	"47 Ronin"	2:43
Total length:		70:38

== Personnel ==
Credits adapted from liner notes:

- Music composer – Ilan Eshkeri
- Music producers – Steve McLaughlin, Teese Gohl
- Music programmers – Jeff Toyne, Paul Saunderson, Steve Wright
- Recording – Adam Miller, Gordon Davidson, Jason Elliott, Joe Kearns, Laurence Anslow, Matt Mysco
- Mixing and mastering – Steve McLaughlin
- Music editor – Andrew Silver
- Assistant music editor – Julie Pearce
- Musical assistance – Josine Cohen, Daisy Chute, Nathaniel Smith, Sam Gohl
- Music supervisor – Rachel Levy
- Executive producer – Scott Stuber, Robert Townson
- Copyist – Vic Fraser
- Executive in charge of music – Mike Knobloch
- Music business affairs – Philip M. Cohen
- Product manager – Jake Voulgarides

Orchestra

- Orchestra – London Metropolitan Orchestra
- Choir – Daisy Chute
- Orchestrators – Jessica Dannheisser, Julian Kershaw, Teese Gohl
- Orchestra conductor – Andy Brown

Instruments

- Bamboo flute – Emi Watanabe
- Bass trombone – Dave Stewart
- Cello, erhu – Caroline Dale
- Chanter – Chad Hobson
- Double bass – Chris Laurence
- French horn – Richard Watkins
- Harp, clasarch harp – Gill Tingay
- Koto, shamisen – Keiko Kitamura
- Moog synthesizer – Andrew Raiher
- Percussion, timpani – Tristan Fry
- Shakuhachi, taiko drums – Joji Hirota
- Tenor trombone – Pete Beachill
- Trumpet – John Barclay
- Tuba – Owen Slade
- Viola – Garfield Jackson
- Violin – David Juritz

== Awards ==
Award	Category	Recipient(s)	Result	Ref.
International Film Music Critics Association	Best Original Score for an Action/Adventure/Thriller Film	Ilan Eshkeri	Nominated	
Motion Picture Sound Editors	Best Sound Editing – Music in a Feature Film	Andrew Silver (supervising music editor); Kenneth Karman, Julie Pearce, Peter Oso Snell (music editors)	Nominated	
