= Malorie (novel) =

2020 novel by Josh Malerman

- Author: Josh Malerman
- Audio read by: Cassandra Campbell
- Language: English
- Genre: Post-apocalyptic
- Publisher: Del Rey Books
- Publication place: United States
- Media type: Hardback, e-book, audiobook
- Pages: 320 pages
- ISBN: 0593156854 First edition hardback
- Preceded by: Bird Box

Malorie is a 2020 post-apocalyptic horror novel by Josh Malerman and the sequel to his 2014 debut novel Bird Box. It was published on July 21, 2020, through Del Rey.

== Synopsis ==
Two years after arriving at a school for the blind, Malorie and her two young children, Olivia and Tom, are forced to venture out of the place again when mass chaos ensues after creatures manage to break in. She sees a blind woman named Annette, who was driven to madness by the creatures, and concludes that the creatures have evolved and can now spread madness through touch.

Twelve years after this, the novel finds Malorie, Olympia, and Tom living in an abandoned Jewish summer camp. Tom and Olympia are now teenagers who find themselves chafing under the multiple restrictions and expectations. Things take a major turn once Malorie learns of another community of survivors in another area far off, and that her parents may be among the shelter's occupants. Along the way, she also learns that there are people who claim to have experimented on the creatures that have decimated humanity and that they may pose an all-new threat to those who have survived.

== Development ==
Malerman began thinking about a sequel to Bird Box after viewing the Netflix adaptation, as his fiancée asked him what would happen to Malorie and stated that this was up to him to determine. The novel was officially announced in March 2019. He has described the writing process as "very fluid" while also stating that writing characters in a universe where they are unable to view their surrounding world posed a challenge. While writing the prior novel Malerman had to excise various portions of Bird Box and planned on adding them into Malorie, but ultimately decided against it.

== Publication ==
Malorie was released in hardback and ebook format on July 21, 2020, through Del Rey Books. An audiobook adaptation narrated by Cassandra Campbell, who also narrated Bird Box, was released through Random House Audio. The novel was initially planned to release in October 2019, but was delayed.

== Reception ==
Bill Sheehan of The Washington Post praised Malerman for "balanc[ing] the novel's various elements – family drama, road novel, supernatural thriller – with skill and genuine compassion for his characters and their blighted lives." The novel was also reviewed in the July 2020 issue of Locus.
