= The High Strung =

American rock band

- Origin: Detroit, Michigan, United States
- Genres: Indie rock, garage rock, alternative rock
- Years active: 2000–present
- Labels: Park the Van, TeePee, Future Farmer, New Fortune, Paper Thin
- Members: Josh Malerman; Chad Stocker; Derek Berk; Stephen Palmer; Mark Owen
- Past members: Jason "Berko" Berkowitz

The High Strung is an American rock band from Detroit, Michigan, United States. The band is composed of lead singers and guitarists Josh Malerman and Mark Owen, guitarist Stephen Palmer, bassist Chad Stocker, and drummer Derek Berk. Malerman, Berk, and Owen attended Michigan State University in the late 1990s before moving to New York City. The band formed in Williamsburg, Brooklyn, when the members of the former East Lansing, Michigan, band The Masons changed their name and added Stocker to the roster. Owen left the band in 2005 and returned in 2016. Palmer joined the group shortly after the recording of Dragon Dicks in early 2010.

These are Good Times, Moxie Bravo, Get the Guests, ¿Posible o' Imposible? and Quiet Riots were produced in Detroit by producer/engineer Jim Diamond.

== Discography ==
- 2000 - As/Is
- 2001 - Soap
- 2002 - Sure as Hell
- 2003 - These are Good Times
- 2003 - Follow Through on Your Backhand
- 2005 - Moxie Bravo
- 2007 - Get the Guests
- 2008 - CreEPy
- 2009 - Ode to the Inverse of the Dude
- 2010 - Live at Guantanamo Bay, Cuba
- 2010 - Dragon Dicks
- 2011 - Clown Car
- 2012 - ¿Posible o' Imposible?
- 2014 - I, Anybody
- 2019 - Quiet Riots
- 2022 - Hannah (or The Whale)
- 2023 - Address Unknown

== In popular culture ==
- While touring in 2004, they left their broken down tour bus on the steps of the Rock and Roll Hall of Fame in Cleveland, Ohio. The bus was adorned with a makeshift plaque reading, in part: "This is a 1988 Chevy G30 used by The High Strung. Although the odometer reads 8,621 miles, it is actually 318,621 miles."
- In 2005, they began touring libraries throughout the state of Michigan, spurring an August 4, 2005, episode of This American Life on Chicago Public Radio titled "Dewey Decibel System".
- The High Strung were featured in an interview in the indie music magazine, Daytrotter in September 2006 in an article titled "The High Strung: A Tattered Atlas for a Co-Pilot and a Friend in Uncle Bob" about their ever-working ways, and relationship with Robert Pollard.
- The High Strung were featured in an article in Time Out New York in June 2007.
- Their song "The Luck You Got" from the album Moxie Bravo is featured as the theme song to the US version of the show Shameless.
