= Other Mommy =

2026 film by Rob Savage

- Theatrical release poster
- Directed by: Rob Savage
- Screenplay by: Nathan Elston
- Based on: Incidents Around the House by Josh Malerman
- Produced by: James Wan
- Starring: Jessica Chastain; Jay Duplass; Arabella Olivia Clark; Dichen Lachman; Arian Moayed; Sean Kaufman; Karen Allen
- Cinematography: Lowell A. Meyer
- Edited by: Peter Gvozdas; John Cutler
- Music by: Patrick Jonsson
- Production company: Blumhouse Atomic Monster
- Distributed by: Universal Pictures
- Release date: October 9, 2026 (United States)
- Running time: 93 minutes
- Country: United States
- Language: English
- Budget: $18–19 million
- Box office: $120.9 million

Other Mommy is a 2026 American psychological horror film directed by Rob Savage from a screenplay by Nathan Elston, based on the 2024 novel Incidents Around the House by Josh Malerman. The film stars Jessica Chastain as a mother who must do everything to protect her seven-year-old daughter (Arabella Olivia Clark) from a supernatural entity that resembles her. Jay Duplass also stars, as the father, while Dichen Lachman, Arian Moayed, Sean Kaufman, and Karen Allen play supporting roles.

James Wan served as a producer through his Blumhouse Atomic Monster banner. Principal photography began in May 2025 in Dublin, Ireland.

Other Mommy was released theatrically in the United States and Canada by Universal Pictures on October 9, 2026. The film received negative reviews from critics but was a box-office success, grossing $120.9 million worldwide against a $18–19 million budget.

== Plot ==
Seven-year-old Isabela "Bela" Martin struggles to adjust to a new school and cope with the growing distance between her parents. Her mother, Ursula, is consumed by her corporate career, while her father, Russell "Russ", is a stay-at-home dad who spends much of his time caring for Bela. Bela begins encountering a supernatural entity resembling her mother that she calls "Other Mommy", which repeatedly asks her to let it into her heart.

One afternoon, Ursula returns home from work unexpectedly while Russ is asleep, ostensibly to have lunch with Bela. Ursula's mannerisms are noticeably stilted, and she eventually asks to be let into Bela's heart, whereupon Bela identifies her as Other Mommy. Russ enters the kitchen when the burning food triggers the smoke alarm and leaves the house in a panic with Bela after seeing Other Mommy contorted unnaturally under the counter.

Other Mommy's appearances grow increasingly frightening as it follows Bela beyond her bedroom, changes shape, and distorts its surroundings. At Russ and Ursula's anniversary party, it takes on the form of Bela's babysitter Kelvin, seemingly makes every guest disappear, lifts Bela to the ceiling, and attempts to force its way into her. Bela fights it off and falls back into the crowded room. Realizing that they are in danger, the family goes to stay with Ursula's friend Frank.

At Frank's house, Bela finds Ursula's contact lens case, confirming Ursula and Frank are having an affair. That night, Other Mommy appears and, exploiting the family's tension, manipulates Bela into wishing Frank out of their lives, subsequently killing Frank in front of the family, surviving the gunshots he fires at it. The family flees to a fast food restaurant, but Other Mommy attacks again, transporting Bela from the play area to her bedroom and then to the ocean near her grandmother Ruth's hilltop house. There, it grows enormous and nearly crushes Bela with its hand. It tells Bela that Ursula wishes she never existed before returning her to the family's car. The family travels to Ruth's house.

Ruth, a clairvoyant, shelters the family and tells Bela that pain is an unavoidable part of life. She hires paranormal investigators, who explain that demons are often drawn to children due to their innocence and identify Other Mommy as a trickster demon seeking to "carnate" into Bela and take over her life, though unable to do so without her permission. The team summons Other Mommy in a séance, but the investigators turn out to be frauds who have never actually encountered a supernatural entity, and are all killed. The family escapes as the entity continues threatening Bela.

Determined to stop running, the family returns home to confront Other Mommy. Their weapons prove ineffective, forcing them to barricade themselves in the basement. Hoping to stop the attacks, Ursula resolves to "destroy" Bela's innocence and finally confesses that Bela's real father is not Russ, but Ursula's first husband, whom she left for Russ. She then admits that she never wanted to be a mother, but promises Bela that she loves her regardless.

Ursula's confession appears to weaken Other Mommy, but it devastates Bela, who runs to her bedroom and begs the entity to enter her heart. Other Mommy appears and promises that Bela will never experience pain again. Remembering Ruth's lesson, Bela fights back, repeatedly denying the entity permission until she defeats it.

Months later, Bela, Ursula, and Russ happily hang Christmas lights together, but Bela notices a despondent look on Ursula's face.

== Cast ==
- Jessica Chastain as Ursula Martin, Bela's mother and Russ' wife
  - Chastain also portrays the demonic entity known as "Other Mommy"
- Arabella Olivia Clark as Isabela "Bela" Martin, a young girl targeted by the Other Mommy
- Jay Duplass as Russell "Russ" Martin, Bela's father and Ursula's husband
- Dichen Lachman as Lois Anthony, an exorcist
- Arian Moayed as Frank
- Karen Allen as Grandma Ruth Martin, Ursula's mother and Bela's grandmother
- Sean Kaufman as Kelvin
- Adam Silver as Brian
- Alec Secăreanu as Ruiss

== Production ==
In April 2025, it was announced that an adaptation of the novel Incidents Around the House was in development, with Rob Savage directing, Nathan Elston writing the screenplay, and Jessica Chastain starring in the lead role. In May, Jay Duplass joined the cast. Principal photography took place in Dublin, Ireland between May 12 and July 9, 2025. Dichen Lachman joined the cast in the following month. In July, Arabella Olivia Clark, Sean Kaufman, Adam Silver, Alec Secăreanu and Karen Allen were added to the cast with the film being retitled to Other Mommy.

== Release ==
Other Mommy was released in the United States on October 9, 2026. The film was previously scheduled to release on May 8, 2026.

=== Home media ===
Other Mommy was released on digital platforms on November 10, 2026. and will be released on 4K, Blu-ray & DVD on December 29, 2026.

== Reception ==
=== Box office ===
As of November 22, 2026, Other Mommy has grossed $59.9 million in the United States and Canada, and $61.1 million in other territories, for a worldwide total of $120.9 million.

In the United States and Canada, the film debuted to $27.8 million from 3,365 theaters, topping the box office. In its second weekend, the film made $8.2 million (dropping 70%), finishing in third.

=== Critical response ===
Metacritic review
breakdown (unweighted)

Positive
3 (19%)
Mixed
9 (56%)
Negative
4 (25%)

The film received negative reviews from critics. On the review aggregator website Rotten Tomatoes, 19% of 106 critics' reviews are positive, with an average rating of 4.4/10. The website's consensus reads: "Despite a valiant turn from Jessica Chastain as the spectral embodiment of a smothering parent, Other Mommy proves too silly for its intermittently effective jump scares to add up to a spooky whole." Metacritic, which uses a weighted average, assigned the film a score of 39 out of 100, based on 16 critics, indicating "generally unfavorable" reviews. Audiences polled by CinemaScore gave the film an average grade of "D+" on an A+ to F scale, while those surveyed by PostTrak gave it a 47% overall positive score, with 33% saying they would definitely recommend the film.

The New York Times called the film a "sometimes-creepy, sometimes-hilarious schlockfest", and questions "What is the other mommy supposed to be?" Benjamin Lee of the Guardian graded the film 2/5. He stated the film started as a "tense, creepy thriller," but turns into an "increasingly absurd battle with a special effects oogum-boogum that gets less scary as the movie progresses."
