= Bird Box (novel) =

2014 novel by Josh Malerman

- First edition book cover
- Author: Josh Malerman
- Language: English
- Genre: Post-apocalyptic
- Published: March 27, 2014 (UK); May 31, 2014 (US)
- Publisher: Harper Voyager (UK), Ecco (US)
- Publication place: United States
- Media type: Print, e-book, audiobook
- Pages: 273 pages
- ISBN: 0062259652
- Followed by: Malorie

Bird Box is a 2014 post-apocalyptic horror novel and the debut novel by American writer and singer Josh Malerman. The book was first published in the United Kingdom on March 27, 2014, through Harper Voyager and in the United States on May 13, 2014, through Ecco Press. The book follows a woman who must find a way to guide herself and her children to safety despite the potential threat from an unseen adversary. The story is partially told via flashbacks and takes place during three time periods.

A sequel to the book, titled Malorie, was released on July 21, 2020. Bird Box was adapted into a film in 2018.

== Plot ==
Malorie and her sister Shannon live together as roommates in Michigan. International news sources report a series of cases involving people suddenly flying into homicidal and suicidal madness. After becoming pregnant following a one-night stand, Malorie realizes that the phenomenon has reached the United States. The madness seems to start when people see something, believed to be an entity or group of entities, which causes people to develop sudden and violent suicidal tendencies. Not being able to determine the threat, people begin hiding in their homes and covering the windows.

Shannon commits suicide after looking out of a window. Malorie follows a newspaper advertisement to a safe house with other survivors: Tom, Jules and his dog Victor, Felix, Don, Cheryl, and Olympia, who, like Malorie, is pregnant. The group barricades itself in the house, only going out blindfolded to get water or dispose of garbage. Tom explains that the original owner of the safe house, George, theorized that the entity could be seen indirectly without repercussions, and watched recorded video from outside the house to test this hypothesis, but killed himself before the housemates could intervene. Now the de facto leader of the house, Tom suggests using dogs to navigate when traveling outside the house, believing they may be immune to the entities. He and Jules search nearby houses for supplies and dogs to train, and find some birds in a box to use them as an alarm, as they become agitated and make noise whenever a person or entity approaches.

After months of isolation, a man named Gary asks for asylum. He claims to have left his previous refuge because Frank, a recluse obsessed with writing in journals, believed the threat was merely caused by mass hysteria, and went so far as to uncover the windows and open the doors to prove it. Gary befriends Don, frequently discussing Frank's ideology. Suspicious, Malorie secretly opens Gary's briefcase and finds "Frank's" journal. She reveals this to the housemates, leading to a majority vote in favor of Gary's eviction. Don becomes increasingly withdrawn and moves to the cellar.

Over the next few months, the survivors use a phone book to call various numbers and leave messages on various answering machines, but receive no response. Olympia and Malorie go into labor simultaneously. As they are giving birth, Don is revealed to have been secretly sheltering Gary in the cellar, and Gary confronts Malorie to confirm her suspicions that he and Frank are the same person. Having already been mad before the cataclysm, he has no problem seeing the entities and has been spying on the house's inhabitants long before seeking refuge. The housemates and Don argue, and he removes the window coverings, causing everyone to go mad and kill each other. Gary opens the attic door to allow an entity to enter as Malorie and Olympia are immobilized; Malorie closes her eyes, but Olympia sees it and goes mad. Before committing suicide, Olympia gives Malorie her newborn child.

With all of the other housemates dead except Victor the dog, Malorie receives a phone call from a survivor named Rick, who received the housemates' message and invites her to a larger refuge with more resources, but she must navigate the river in a boat. Malorie is unable to accept, but slowly puts the house in order and continues to communicate with Rick. She raises the children using harsh training techniques to ensure their survival, heightening their senses and teaching them to automatically keep their eyes closed, and refuses to give them names, only referring to them as "Girl" and "Boy”. When venturing out for supplies, Malorie discovers that animals are not immune to the entity, as Victor goes insane and is killed.

When the children are four years old and extremely disciplined with superior hearing abilities, Malorie decides to attempt the journey to Rick's refuge in a rowboat. They navigate the river while blindfolded, encountering another madman who tries to convince them to remove their blindfolds, and are attacked by wolves, injuring Malorie. At a split in the river, Malorie musters the courage to remove her blindfold briefly to navigate them down the right channel, and they arrive at the refuge. They discover that it was originally a school for the blind, and are met by the blind Rick among dozens of others, some of whom have blinded themselves, but he convinces her that they have since ceased the practice after finding other ways to handle the situation. Cautious but hopeful, Malorie finally allows herself to name the children "Tom" and "Olympia", and tells them to remove their blindfolds.

== Reception ==
Critical reception for Bird Box has been positive and Malerman has received comparisons to Stephen King and Jonathan Carroll. Tasha Robinson of The A.V. Club gave the book a B rating, writing "Malerman overreaches a bit in his debut, which could use as much attention to the cast as to the mood, but the mood is chillingly effective. Reading it feels like accepting a dare to walk into a strange place, eyes closed, with no idea who, or what, might be reaching out to make contact."

Malerman wrote the rough draft of Bird Box prior to the release of the 2008 M. Night Shyamalan film The Happening and the 2009 film The Road (although the novel The Road was written in 2006), which caused him to worry that the book "might get lost in the shuffle".

=== Awards and nominations ===
- Michigan Notable Book Award (2015, won)
- James Herbert Award (2015, nominated)
- Bram Stoker Award for Best First Novel (2015, nominated)

== Film adaptation ==
=== Bird Box (2018) ===
Film rights to Bird Box were optioned by Universal Studios in 2013, prior to the book's release. Scott Stuber and Chris Morgan were initially set to produce the film, with Andy Muschietti (It, Mama) as director and Eric Heisserer in negotiations to pen the script. Netflix then acquired the rights of the book with Sandra Bullock and John Malkovich in starring roles, Morgan co-producing, Heisserer writing, and Susanne Bier as the director.

=== Bird Box Barcelona (2023) ===
A spin-off sequel, Bird Box Barcelona, was released on Netflix on July 14, 2023.
