= Rob Savage =

English filmmaker (born 1992)

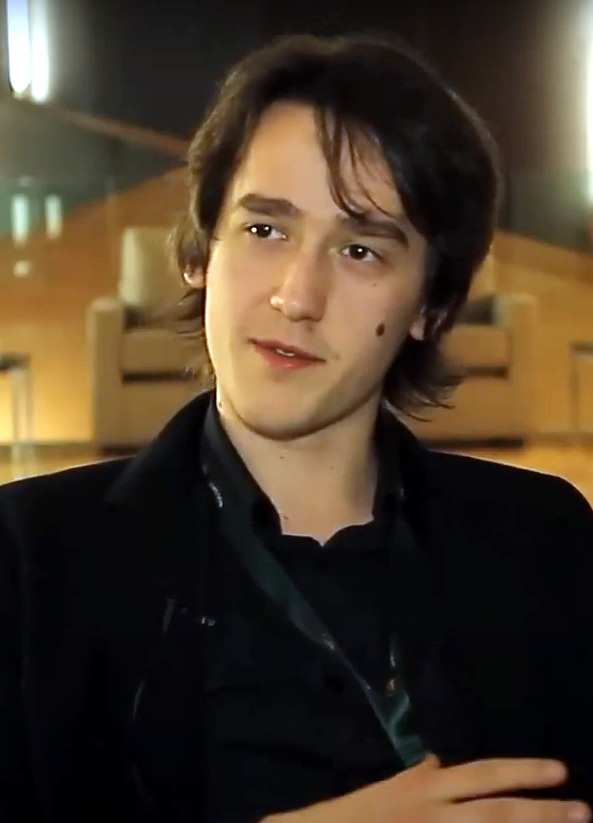
- Savage in February 2013
- Born: July 1992 (age 34); Shrewsbury, England
- Occupation: Filmmaker
- Spouse: Erin Birgy (m. 2023)

Robert Savage (born 1992) is an English filmmaker. Initially gaining attention at the age of 19 when he wrote, directed, produced, and edited the drama film Strings (2012), he later became more widely known for his work on horror films such as Host (2020), Dashcam (2021), The Boogeyman (2023), and Other Mommy (2026).

== Early life ==
Robert Savage was born in Shrewsbury in July 1992. When he was a child, his father showed him the animated action film Akira (1988), which inspired him to abandon his goal of becoming a comic book illustrator in favour of a career as a filmmaker. His first venture into filmmaking was a 20-minute short he created at the age of 13, which depicted a young boy experiencing inner turmoil when his online girlfriend requests a picture of his penis.

== Career ==
Savage began his career by making short films and commercials. He made his debut when he wrote, directed, produced, and edited the low-budget drama film Strings (2012), which won the Raindance Award at the British Independent Film Awards and received praise for its high quality despite Savage being just 19 years old when it was released. In 2016, he revealed he was working a horror film titled Seaholme, but it was never made.

In 2020, he had his breakthrough when he co-wrote, directed, and produced the horror film Host for Shudder. That same year, he established the production company BOO-URNS, which he named after a joke in the 1995 Simpsons episode "A Star Is Burns". After the success of Host, it was announced that he had signed on to direct an untitled Sam Raimi-produced film based on an original idea by Savage and Host co-writer Jed Shepherd. He also signed on to direct an untitled female-centric horror film taking place in a prison, which was described as "The Conjuring behind bars". The film will be released by StudioCanal and is written by Savage and Shepherd. Savage signed a three-picture deal with Blumhouse Productions, with the first release from that deal coming when Savage directed the horror film Dashcam (2021), which he co-wrote with Shepherd and their Host co-writer Gemma Hurley.

In 2023, he directed The Boogeyman, based on a short story by Stephen King. His next projects include directing a horror film adaptation of Night of the Ghoul for 20th Century Studios and a TV adaptation of Jason Arnopp's The Last Days of Jack Sparks. That same year, he participated in Ca' Foscari Short Film Festival.

In October 2024, it was announced that he is set to direct the horror film Molepeople with Anthony Ramos and Ben Mendelsohn starring in the film. Raphael Margules and J. D. Lifshitz would produce through their BoulderLight Pictures banner, alongside Rough House Pictures. In October 2026, LaKeith Stanfield had replaced Ramos and Jason Blum would produce through his Blumhouse Atomic banner, alongside Paramount Primal. It is set to be released in the United States on August 27, 2027 by Paramount Pictures. Savage eventually left the film and was replaced by Ben Wheatley, but will serve as an executive producer on the film.

In April 2025, it was announced that he would direct Other Mommy, which is based on the 2024 novel Incidents Around the House by Josh Malerman. It stars Jessica Chastain, Jay Duplass, Dichen Lachman and Arabella Olivia Clark. James Wan serves as a producer through his Blumhouse Atomic Monster banner, alongside Spin a Black Yarn. It was released theatrically on October 9, 2026 by Universal Pictures.

== Influences ==
In a 2011 interview, Savage named Polish filmmaker Krzysztof Kieślowski as his favourite at the time, calling Kieślowski's film Three Colours: Blue (1993) a "completely revelatory experience". In the same interview, he said that 2001: A Space Odyssey (1968) is "indisputably the best film ever made" but named his personal top five films at the time as Three Colours Blue, Evil Dead II (1987), Akira (1988), The Limey (1999), and Requiem (2006). In a 2022 interview, he said that his three favourite horror films are Evil Dead II, The Innocents (1961), and Lake Mungo (2008).

== Personal life ==
Savage married American musician Erin Birgy, better known as Mega Bog, in November 2023.

== Filmography ==
=== Feature film ===
Year	Title	Director	Writer	Producer	DoP	Editor
2012	Strings	Yes	Yes	Yes	Yes	Yes
2020	Host	Yes	Yes	Executive	No	No
2021	Dashcam	Yes	Yes	Yes	No	No
2023	The Boogeyman	Yes	No	No	No	No
2026	Other Mommy	Yes	No	Executive	No	No

=== Short film ===
Year	Title	Director	Writer	Producer	DoP	Editor
2009	Sex Scene	Yes	Yes	Yes	Yes	Yes
2010	Act	Yes	Yes	Yes	Yes	Yes
2011	Sit in Silence	Yes	Yes	No	Yes	Yes
2011	Polaroid	Yes	Yes	No	No	No
2011	Touching from a Distance	Yes	Yes	No	Yes	Yes
2012	Sticks and Stones	Yes	Yes	No	Yes	No
2012	Assessment	No	No	No	Yes	No
2012	I Am	No	No	No	Yes	No
2012	Who Killed the Bear?	No	No	No	Yes	No
2014	Valentine	No	No	No	Yes	No
2014	Healey's House	Yes	Yes	No	No	No
2015	Absence	Yes	Yes	No	No	No
2016	Dawn of the Deaf	Yes	Yes	No	No	No
2017	Salt	Yes	Yes	No	No	Yes
2026	Midnight Snack	No	No	Yes	No	No

=== Television ===
Year	Title	Director	Writer	Notes
2018	True Horror	Yes	Yes	Episode: "Ghost in the Wall"
2019	Britannia	Yes	No	3 episodes
2020	Soulmates	Yes	No	2 episodes
