= Chris Morgan (filmmaker) =

American screenwriter

- Education: University of California, Riverside
- Occupations: Screenwriter, producer
- Known for: Fast & Furious film series

Chris Morgan is an American screenwriter and producer. He is best known for helping write most installments of the Fast & Furious film series, beginning with The Fast and the Furious: Tokyo Drift (2006). His other screenwriting credits include Cellular (2004), Wanted (2008), 47 Ronin (2013), Shazam! Fury of the Gods (2023) and Red One (2024).

Morgan founded Chris Morgan Productions, which entered a first-look production agreement with Universal Pictures in 2011. He expanded the company's television operations through a deal with 20th Century Fox Television in 2013. His television work includes co-creating The Troop, creating Gang Related, and executive producing Fast & Furious Spy Racers. His producing credits include The Mummy, Bird Box and Bird Box Barcelona.

== Early life and education ==
Morgan attended the University of California, Riverside, where he initially studied English before changing his major to political science. He graduated with a bachelor's degree in 1995. During his teens and twenties, he worked in a video store, where he began writing his first screenplay between assisting customers.

== Career ==
=== Early screenwriting work ===
Morgan's entry into professional screenwriting followed work as a production assistant. Fellow assistant Wayne Billheimer read his screenplay and subsequently helped it reach DreamWorks story editor Andrea McCall. Although the screenplay did not sell, McCall referred Morgan to an agent and a lawyer.

Morgan wrote the screenplay for Cellular (2004), directed by David R. Ellis, and later co-wrote Wanted (2008), directed by Timur Bekmambetov. He also co-wrote the screenplay for 47 Ronin (2013) with Hossein Amini, sharing screen-story credit with Walter Hamada. The fantasy action film starred Keanu Reeves and was directed by Carl Rinsch.

=== Fast & Furious ===
Morgan joined the Fast & Furious franchise as the screenwriter of The Fast and the Furious: Tokyo Drift (2006), directed by Justin Lin. He subsequently wrote Fast & Furious (2009), Fast Five (2011), Fast & Furious 6 (2013), Furious 7 (2015) and The Fate of the Furious (2017). His involvement also expanded into producing, including executive-producer credits on Fast & Furious 6 and Furious 7, and a producer credit on The Fate of the Furious.

Morgan co-wrote, with Drew Pearce, and produced the franchise spin-off Fast & Furious Presents: Hobbs & Shaw (2019). Directed by David Leitch, the film starred Dwayne Johnson and Jason Statham as Luke Hobbs and Deckard Shaw. He also served as an executive producer of Fast X (2023).

In June 2023, Universal was reported to be developing another film centered on Johnson's Hobbs character, with Morgan attached as screenwriter and producer.

=== Chris Morgan Productions and producing ===
In April 2011, Morgan signed a two-year first-look production deal with Universal Pictures. The agreement established his production operation on the Universal lot and accompanied his continuing work on the Fast & Furious series. Projects reported in development at the time included The Eye of the World, The Vatican Tapes and Heatseekers.

Morgan received story and producer credits on The Vatican Tapes (2015), directed by Mark Neveldine. He also produced The Mummy (2017), directed by Alex Kurtzman. With Kurtzman, he helped develop Universal's planned Dark Universe, an interconnected series based on the studio's classic monster characters. In November 2017, it was reported that both filmmakers had departed the enterprise.

Morgan's producing work also included Bird Box (2018), directed by Susanne Bier and starring Sandra Bullock, and its Spanish-language expansion, Bird Box Barcelona (2023), written and directed by Álex and David Pastor. He was an executive producer of Witches in the Woods (2019), directed by Jordan Barker.

=== Other feature work and development ===
In 2008, Morgan was hired to write a new version of the screenplay for a proposed Gears of War adaptation at New Line Cinema, with Len Wiseman attached to direct. The project had previously been scripted by Stuart Beattie.

In October 2011, Universal acquired Crime of the Century, a science-fiction heist pitch written by Daniel Kunka, with Dan Trachtenberg attached to direct and Morgan attached to produce through Chris Morgan Productions. In January 2012, Universal acquired an alien-invasion pitch by F. Scott Frazier, which Morgan's company was to produce with Strike Entertainment.

In 2012, Morgan and Fredrik Malmberg were announced as producers of The Legend of Conan, a proposed continuation of Conan the Barbarian with Arnold Schwarzenegger returning to the title role. In 2017, Morgan said Universal had decided not to proceed with the proposed film, citing its budget and questions about its commercial prospects.

Morgan co-wrote Shazam! Fury of the Gods (2023) with Henry Gayden. The film was directed by David F. Sandberg and continued the story of Billy Batson and his foster siblings. He wrote and produced Red One (2024), directed by Jake Kasdan, from a story by Hiram Garcia. The Christmas action comedy starred Johnson and Chris Evans.

In 2026, Morgan was reported to be writing and producing an untitled Netflix heist thriller set in the world of MotoGP, with Alan Ritchson attached to star and produce.

=== Television ===
Morgan co-created The Troop with Greg Coolidge and Max Burnett. The series follows teenagers who belong to a secret organization that protects the world from monsters. It was commissioned by Nickelodeon in 2009, and Morgan also served as an executive producer.

In 2012, Morgan was attached to produce The Centurion, a drama developed for CBS by Charley and Vlas Parlapanides, with Bob Sertner also producing. The project concerned a Force Recon Marine who returns to police work after making a promise to God.

In April 2013, Morgan established a television production operation under a two-year deal with 20th Century Fox Television. The agreement covered writing and producing new series, supervising other writers and developing projects for multiple networks. He also executive produced the ABC pilot Big Thunder, based on Disney's Big Thunder Mountain Railroad attraction.

Morgan created Gang Related, which aired on Fox in 2014, and served as a writer and executive producer. The crime drama follows a Los Angeles police officer whose ties to a criminal organization conflict with his duties on a gang task force. Its other executive producers included Brian Grazer, Francie Calfo, Scott Rosenbaum and Allen Hughes.

Morgan later served as an executive producer of the DreamWorks Animation series Fast & Furious Spy Racers, alongside Vin Diesel, Neal H. Moritz, Tim Hedrick and Bret Haaland. The Netflix series follows Tony Toretto, a teenage cousin of Dominic Toretto who is recruited by a government agency.

=== Comics ===
Morgan co-wrote Salem: Queen of Thorns with Kevin Walsh for BOOM! Studios. The colonial-era action-horror comic centers on Elias Hooke, a warrior-priest who pursues a demon. In an interview released by the publisher, Morgan described comics as an opportunity to explore characters and stories beyond the constraints of his film work.

=== In popular culture ===
Morgan was parodied in a The Onion video in which the screenwriter of Fast Five was portrayed by a five-year-old child.

== Filmography ==
=== Film ===
Writing and producing credits are listed below.

Year	Title	Writer	Producer	Director(s)	References
2004	Cellular	Yes	No	David R. Ellis	
2006	The Fast and the Furious: Tokyo Drift	Yes	No	Justin Lin	
2008	Wanted	Yes	No	Timur Bekmambetov	
2009	Fast & Furious	Yes	No	Justin Lin	
2011	Fast Five	Yes	No	Justin Lin	
2013	Fast & Furious 6	Yes	Executive	Justin Lin	
2013	47 Ronin	Yes	No	Carl Rinsch	
2015	Furious 7	Yes	Executive	James Wan	
2015	The Vatican Tapes	Story	Yes	Mark Neveldine	
2017	The Fate of the Furious	Yes	Yes	F. Gary Gray	
2017	The Mummy	No	Yes	Alex Kurtzman	
2018	Bird Box	No	Yes	Susanne Bier	
2019	Fast & Furious Presents: Hobbs & Shaw	Yes	Yes	David Leitch	
2019	Witches in the Woods	No	Executive	Jordan Barker	
2022	A ciegas	No	Yes	David Pastor and Álex Pastor	
2023	Shazam! Fury of the Gods	Yes	No	David F. Sandberg	
2023	Fast X	No	Executive	Louis Leterrier	
2023	Bird Box Barcelona	No	Yes	David Pastor and Álex Pastor	
2024	Red One	Yes	Yes	Jake Kasdan	

==== Other credits ====
Year	Title	Role
2001	Lloyd	Electric swingman
2003	S.W.A.T.	Script revisions

=== Television ===
Year(s)	Title	Creator	Executive producer	Writer	Notes
2009–2013	The Troop	Yes	Yes	No	Co-created with Greg Coolidge and Max Burnett
2013	Big Thunder	No	Yes	No	Television pilot
2014	Gang Related	Yes	Yes	Yes	Wrote two episodes
2019–2021	Fast & Furious Spy Racers	No	Yes	No	

=== Comics ===
- Salem: Queen of Thorns — co-writer with Kevin Walsh; published by BOOM! Studios.
