= Josh Malerman =

American novelist

- Josh Malerman at the Michigan premiere of his documentary, To All the Books in 2026
- Occupations: Author; Singer/Songwriter; Director
- Notable work: Bird Box; Incidents Around the House; Moxie Bravo; To All the Books
- Website: www.joshmalerman.com

Josh Malerman is an American novelist, songwriter, movie director, film producer, cartoonist and rhythm guitarist for the rock band The High Strung. He is best known for writing horror and his post-apocalyptic novel, Bird Box (2014), which was the inspiration of the Netflix film of the same name. In 2020, he founded the production company Spin a Black Yarn with manager Ryan Lewis.

== Career ==
Before his debut novel, Bird Box, was published by Ecco/HarperCollins, Malerman had written fourteen manuscripts, never having shopped one of them. Bird Box was published in the United Kingdom and United States in 2014 to much critical acclaim.

When a friend from high school, Dave Simmer, who had worked with authors and properties in Hollywood, asked Malerman's permission to send one of his books to some people he knew in the publishing industry, Malerman sent Goblin, a collection of novellas that take place in the titular city of Goblin. Malerman subsequently spoke with an agent and editors. He says this of the part Simmer played in his career: "There were two things at play at that point in time; one, Dave was a ghostly benefactor, golden-hearted and smart, descending from the sky to help me. And two, what may sound like luck couldn't have become good fortune if I wasn't armed with a dozen novels to talk shop with."

A limited edition of Goblin was published on Halloween in 2017, by Earthling Publications.

The song "The Luck You Got" from The High Strung album Moxie Bravo is featured as the theme song to the US version of the show Shameless.

In October 2017, Malerman was the subject of a documentary, Quilt of Delirium, directed by Scott Allen.

Del Rey Books purchased the rights to Unbury Carol, a fantastic horror-western published in April 2018.

Cemetery Dance published a hardcover limited edition of On This, the Day of the Pig in October 2018.

Bird Box was adapted into a post-apocalyptic film of the same name. It was directed by Susanne Bier and written by Eric Heisserer, stars Sandra Bullock, Trevante Rhodes, and John Malkovich, and was released on December 21, 2018, by Netflix.

Incidents Around the House was published by Del Rey Books on June 25, 2024. Stephen King hailed Incidents Around the House as “the rare novel that’s authentically scary” and “THE EXORCIST level of scary."

A film adaptation of Incidents Around the House titled Other Mommy is currently filming, with Rob Savage set to direct and Nathan Elston writing the screenplay. Jessica Chastain will star in the film. Atomic Monster and Blumhouse, in association with Spin a Black Yarn, are producing for Universal Pictures.

A film adaptation of Decorum at the Deathbed is in the works, with Jenna Mattison writing the script and Spin a Black Yarn producing.

== Personal life ==
Malerman lives in Michigan with his wife, artist/musician Allison Laakko.

== Awards ==
- Michigan Notable Book Award (2015, won – Bird Box)
- Shirley Jackson Award (2015, nominated – Bird Box)
- James Herbert Award (2015, nominated – Bird Box)
- Bram Stoker Award for Best First Novel (2015, nominated – Bird Box)
- Bram Stoker Award for Best Long Fiction (2016, nominated – The Jupiter Drop)
- Bram Stoker Award for Novel (2017, nominated – Black Mad Wheel)
- Bram Stoker Award for Best Fiction Collection (2017, nominated – Goblin)
- Bram Stoker Award for Novel (2018, nominated – Unbury Carol)
- Bram Stoker Award for Novel (2019, nominated – Inspection)
- Bram Stoker Award for Novel (2020, nominated – Malorie)
- Bram Stoker Award for Short Fiction (2020, won – "One Last Transformation")
- Bram Stoker Award for Novel (2022, nominated – Daphne)
- Bram Stoker Award for Best Fiction Collection (2023, nominated – Spin a Black Yarn)
- World Fantasy Award for Best Novella (2024, won – "Half the House is Haunted")
- Bram Stoker Award for Novel (2024, nominated – Incidents Around the House)
- Locus Award for Horror Novel (2024, nominated – Incidents Around the House)
- World Fantasy Award for Best Long Fiction (2026, nominated – "The Spotter")

== Bibliography ==
=== Novels ===
- Bird Box (2014, ECCO/HarperCollins)
- Black Mad Wheel (2017, ECCO/HarperCollins)
- Goblin (2017, Earthling Publications)
- Unbury Carol (2018, Del Rey/Penguin Random House)
- On This, The Day of the Pig (2018, Cemetery Dance)
- Inspection (2019, Del Rey/Penguin Random House)
- Carpenter's Farm (2020, serialized on joshmalerman.com)
- Malorie (2020, Del Rey/Penguin Random House)
- Pearl (2021, Del Rey/Penguin Random House) (originally published as On This, the Day of the Pig)
- Ghoul n' the Cape (2022, limited edition, Earthling Publications)
- Daphne (2022, Del Rey/Penguin Random House)
- Spin a Black Yarn (2023, Del Rey/Penguin Random House)
- Incidents Around the House (2024, Del Rey/Penguin Random House)
- Pictures of You (2026, Del Rey/Penguin Random House)

=== Novellas ===
- Ghastle and Yule (2014, published as a Kindle Single)
- A House at the Bottom of a Lake (2016, published by This is Horror)
- A Little Red Book of Requests (2019)
- Dandy (2020, published by Cemetery Dance in the anthology Midnight Under the Big Top: Tales of Murder, Madness, and Magic)
- The Spotter (2025, published by Written Backwards in the anthology You, Human Volume 2)

=== Nonfiction ===
- Watching Evil Dead (2025, Del Rey/Penguin Random House)

=== Short stories ===
- "A Fiddlehead Party on Carpenter's Farm" (2015, published in Shadows Over Main Street)
- "Clark! Stop!" (2015, published in the Metropolitan de'Troit)
- "Plots" (2015, published in the Metropolitan de'Troit)
- "Danny" (2016, published in Scary Out There)
- "The Bigger Bedroom" (2016, published in Chiral Mad 3)
- "Who is Bringing Milk to Me?" (2016, published in Out of Tune– Book 2)
- "I Can Taste the Blood/Vision I" (2016, published in I Can Taste The Blood)
- "The One You Live With" (2016, published in Gutted: Beautiful Horror Stories)
- "The Givens Sensor Board" (2016, published in Lost Signals)
- "Matter" (2016, published in "Cemetery Dance" Issue 74/75)
- "The Jupiter Drop" (2016, published in You, Human)
- "The House of the Head" (2017, published in New Fears)
- "Your Boy" (on joshmalerman.com)
- "Jessica Malerman" (2017, published in Dark Moon Digest magazine)
- "Lime" (2017, published in Hardboiled Horror)
- "Basic Shade" (2018, published in Primogen: Origin of Monsters)
- "Room 4 at the Haymaker" (2018, published in Lost Highways: Dark Fictions from the Road)
- "Adam's Bed" (2018, published in Doorbells at Dusk)
- "Tenets" (2018, published in Hark! The Herald Angels Scream)
- "Frank, Hide" (2018, published in Phantoms)
- "Fafa Dillinger's Box" (2019, published in A Little Red Book of Requests)
- "Dead Witch's Hair" (2019, published in A Little Red Book of Requests)
- "Breadcrumbs" (2019, published in A Little Red Book of Requests)
- "1000 Words on a Tombstone: Dolores Ray" (2019, published in In Darkness Delight Volume One)
- "By Post" (2019, published in Weird Tales #363)
- "1000 Words on a Tombstone: Bully Jack" (2019, published in In Darkness Delight Volume Two)
- "Alarms of Eden" (2019, published in the StokerCon 2019 Souvenir Anthology)
- "From the Living Room of Cottage 6" (2019, published in Ten Word Tragedies)
- "Summertide" (2019, published in Shock Totem 11)
- "One Last Transformation" (2020, published in Miscreations)
- "A Ben Evans Film" (2020, published in Final Cuts)
- "Decorum at the Deathbed" (2020, Audible Original)
- "The Cries of the Cat" (2020, published in Don't Turn Out the Lights)
- "Special Meal" (2021, published in When Things Get Dark)
- "Provenance Pond" (2021, published in Beyond the Veil)
- "Door to Door" (2021, published in Shadow Atlas)
- "Mrs. Addison's Nest" (2022, published in Dark Stars)
- "A Solid Black Lighthouse on a Pier in the Cryptic" (2022, published in Orphans of Bliss)
- "Dungeon Punchinello" (2022, published in The Hideous Book of Hidden Horrors)
- "There are no Basements in the Bible" (2022, published in Chiral Mad 5)
- "It Waits in the Woods" (2023, Amazon Original Stories)
- "Löyly Sow-na" (2023, published in Christmas and Other Horrors)
- "Optimism at the Orbit" (2023, published in The Drive-In Multiplex)
- "Bad" (2023, published in The Good, The Bad, & The Uncanny: Tales of the Very Weird West)
- "Children Aren't the Only Ones Who Know Where the Presents are Hidden" (2024, published in The Darkest Night)
- "'Hide & Seek' by Swann" (2025, published in 120 Murders)
- "The Picnicker" (2025, published in Night & Day)
- "I Love the Dead" (2025, published in The End of the World as We Know It)
- "On The Amtrak, Heading Home" (2025, published in Why I Love Horror)
- "That Hannie Agnes" (2026, published in All Hallows Eve)
- "The Obsession of the Adversary" (2026, published in Unearthed: New Horror of Ancient Ruins)
- "Christmas in Goblin" (2026, published in Silent Nightmares: Haunting Stories to Be Told on the Longest Night of the Year)
- "Leg Stretch" (2026, published in Ghost Lights)

=== Filmography ===
==== Director ====
- Jizzly Bear, directed by Josh Malerman (2015)
- To All the Books, directed by Josh Malerman (2025, produced by Beck/Woods)
- Frankenmuth, directed by Josh Malerman (2026)
- Impermanent Opinions, directed by Josh Malerman (2026)

==== Adaptations ====
- Bird Box, directed by Susanne Bier (2018, produced by Netflix)
- Other Mommy, directed by Rob Savage (2026, produced by Atomic Monster, Blumhouse Productions, Spin a Black Yarn and Universal Pictures)
- A Ben Evans Film, directed by James Henry Hall & Bret K. Hall (produced by Magical Jungle Productions, Spin A Black Yarn, and Little Spark Films)

==== Producer ====
- We Need to Do Something, directed by Sean King O'Grady (2021, produced by IFC Midnight)
- Bird Box Barcelona, directed by Álex and David Pastor (2023, produced by Netflix)

=== Albums ===
- Bid Me Off (1998, Malerman/Owen)
- A Lot of Old Reasons (1999, Malerman/Owen)
- Mary Muzzle (1999, solo)
- Here Comes The Cheer (2000, The High Strung)
- As Is (2000, The High Strung)
- Soap (2001, EP, The High Strung)
- Sure as Hell (2002, EP, The High Strung)
- These Are Good Times (2003, The High Strung)
- Follow Through on Your Backhand (2004, EP, The High Strung)
- Moxie Bravo (2005, The High Strung)
- Get the Guests (2007, The High Strung)
- Phantom of the Opry (2008, solo)
- CreEPy (2008, EP, The High Strung)
- Ode to the Inverse (2009, The High Strung)
- Dragon Dicks (2010, The High Strung)
- Live at Guantanamo Bay, Cuba (2010, The High Strung)
- Malerman/Owen I (2010, Malerman/Owen)
- Clown Car (2011, The High Strung)
- Malerman/Owen II (2012, Malerman/Owen)
- Preposterous! (2012, solo)
- ?Posible o' Imposible? (2012, The High Strung)
- I, Anybody (2014, The High Strung)
- Quiet Riots (2019, The High Strung)
- HannaH (2021, The High Strung)
- According to Hoyle (2023, solo)
- According to Hoyle (score compendium) (2023, solo)
- Hoyle's Dream (According to Hoyle score compendium II) (2023, solo)
- Address Unknown (2023, The High Strung)
- Henry the 9th (2026, solo)
- Wind-Up Toy (2026, solo)
