= Salem (comics) =

- Elias Hooke holding his sickle in front of his face, with the Queen of Thorns visible in its reflection. Cover of issue 3.

Publication information
- Publisher: Boom! Studios
- Schedule: Monthly
- Format: Limited series
- Genre: Horror
- Publication date: May – October 2008
- No. of issues: 4 + #0 (January 2008)
- Main character: Elias Hooke

Creative team
- Created by: Chris Morgan; Kevin W. Walsh; Mike Hawthorne
- Written by: Chris Morgan; Kevin W. Walsh
- Artist: Wilfredo Torres
- Letterer: Marshall Dillon
- Colorist: Andrew Dalhouse
- Editor: Mark Waid

Collected editions
- Salem: ISBN 1-934506-46-X

Salem (long title: Salem: Queen of Thorns) is a 4-issue American comic book limited series published by Boom! Studios and written by Chris Morgan and Kevin W. Walsh.

== Publication history ==
A short issue zero in black-and-white was released for San Diego Comic Con in 2006 by Conspiracy Factory, with art by Mike Hawthorne. In 2007 the story was picked up by Boom! and an extended issue zero was released, this time with art by Wilfredo Torres. The story went on for four more issues. It was collected in 2009.

== Plot synopsis ==
The story centers around Elias Hooke, a former inquisitor for the Puritan Church in colonial Salem. He retired from clerical service after discovering that his participation in the Salem Witch Trials had resulted in the executions of only innocent people, while true evil lurked not in people, but as manifestations of nature. He encounters the Queen of Thorns, a demon witch that takes the form of a gnarled, splintering dead tree.

After the Queen kills his family, he leaves the Church in disillusionment, and begins a crusade to fight the true "witchcraft" in Salem, the Queen and other true "witches" of her ilk. His weapon of choice is a sickle, which he holds in his hand such that it appears much like a prosthetic hook. After saving an accused (and self-admitted) witch, Hannah, she, he and young priest struggling with his faith find themselves running from both the Church, who wants Hooke killed for his apostasy and Hannah for her witchcraft, and the Queen, for whom Hooke is her largest threat.

== Collected editions ==
The series was collected into a trade paperback:

- Salem: Queen of Thorns (February 2009, ISBN 1-934506-46-X)
