= Strings (2012 film) =

- Directed by: Rob Savage
- Written by: Rob Savage
- Produced by: Rob Savage; Nathan Craig
- Starring: Philine Lembeck; Oliver Malam; Hannah Wilder; Sid Akbar Ali; Sandra Hüller
- Cinematography: Rob Savage
- Edited by: Rob Savage
- Music by: Johnny Clyde; Thom Robson; Robin Schlochtermeier
- Production company: Idle Films
- Distributed by: Vertigo Films
- Release dates: September 2012 (Raindance Film Festival); December 2012 (United Kingdom)
- Running time: 89 minutes
- Country: United Kingdom
- Language: English
- Budget: £5,000

Strings is a 2012 British independent drama film written, directed, produced, and edited by Rob Savage in his feature-length directorial debut. It received praise for its high quality despite Savage's young age of 19 when it was released as well as its low budget of £5,000.

== Plot ==
Four teenagers in England deal with romantic endeavours during their final summer before they move away to attend university. Grace, a visiting German student who is soon to return home, falls for the quiet and distant Jon; meanwhile, Grace's friend Scout becomes entangled in an increasingly violent relationship with her long-term boyfriend Chris.

== Cast ==
- Philine Lembeck as Grace
- Oliver Malam as Jon
- Hannah Wilder as Scout
- Sid Akbar Ali as Chris
- Giorgio Spiegelfeld as Giorgio
- Sandra Hüller as Mother
- Durassie Kiangangu as Michael

== Production ==
Savage was working on his short film Sit in Silence (2011) when he watched the German drama film Requiem (2006), featuring a performance by actress Sandra Hüller which moved him so much that he managed to arrange to meet her in Munich to discuss collaborating. After the meeting, Hüller introduced Savage to Philine Lembeck, a younger actress Hüller was mentoring at the time. Savage began writing the screenplay with the two in mind, taking a year to finish the final draft. The film was shot on a Sony FX-1 with an SG Blade 35mm lens. Filming took roughly a month, with its low budget totalling £5,000.

== Release ==
After a successful run in a number of film festivals, during which the film won the Raindance Award at the British Independent Film Awards, Strings was picked up for distribution by Vertigo Films in December 2012.
