= Incidents Around the House =

2024 horror novel by Josh Malerman

- Author: Josh Malerman
- Audio read by: Delanie Nicole Gill
- Language: English
- Genre: Horror
- Publisher: Del Rey
- Publication date: June 25, 2024
- Publication place: United States
- Media type: Print (hardcover), e-book, audiobook
- Pages: 384
- ISBN: 978-0-593-72312-8

Incidents Around the House is a 2024 horror novel by American author Josh Malerman. It was published by Del Rey on June 25, 2024. Narrated in the first person by an eight-year-old girl, the novel follows her family as they are pursued by a supernatural entity she calls Other Mommy.

The novel was nominated for the 2024 Bram Stoker Award for Superior Achievement in a Novel and was a finalist for the 2025 Locus Award for Best Horror Novel. A film adaptation titled Other Mommy, directed by Rob Savage and starring Jessica Chastain, was released in October 2026.

== Publication ==
Del Rey released the novel in the United States in hardcover, electronic, and audiobook formats on June 25, 2024. The audiobook is narrated by Delanie Nicole Gill and has a running time of eight hours and 24 minutes. A 400-page paperback edition was published on June 3, 2025.

== Plot ==
Eight-year-old Bela lives in Chaps, Michigan, with her parents, Ursula and Russ, whom she calls Mommy and Daddo. For several years, she has secretly been visited by a humanoid entity she calls Other Mommy, which usually emerges from her bedroom closet. Other Mommy repeatedly asks to enter Bela's heart. Bela understands that this would allow the entity to inhabit her body while she is sent elsewhere, and consistently refuses.

Bela's parents initially dismiss Other Mommy as an imaginary friend, but their marriage is deteriorating, and Bela suspects Ursula is having an affair. The entity becomes increasingly aggressive, appearing outside Bela's bedroom and later at a playground, where it imitates Bela's friend Deb and reveals hairy fingers, causing Bela to panic and fall. During a party, a guest named Marsha also sees the creature.

Bela later encounters a figure resembling Ursula that confesses to having an affair, resenting motherhood, and wanting to begin life again in another body. When the real Ursula arrives, Bela realizes the figure is Other Mommy impersonating her. Ursula sees the entity as well, and the family flees when it follows them to a neighbor's house.

They take refuge with Ursula's mother, Ruth, who believes Bela's story. Bela reveals that Other Mommy has approached her hundreds of times and wants permission to possess her. Ruth contacts Lois Anthony, who investigates paranormal phenomena. Lois concludes that the being is not a ghost but an entity attempting to reincarnate through Bela.

During a séance, a participant reports that Other Mommy has given Bela a “present”. Ursula then reveals that her lover, Frank Doherty, has been found dead inside a closet. Bela believes Other Mommy killed him to repair her parents' marriage.

The family repeatedly relocates, but Other Mommy follows them. They seek help from churches and paranormal investigators and eventually travel to Goblin, where they stay with Ruth's friend Evelyn. After Evelyn sees Other Mommy manifest in her bathroom, Bela concludes that the haunting is attached to her rather than their home.

Back home, the family installs alarms and gets guard dogs, but Other Mommy bypasses these precautions and impersonates Kelvin, a teenage babysitter Bela trusts. A paranormal investigator named Brian witnesses the entity but leaves without helping after touching Other Mommy, apparently satisfying his interest in it.

Lois suggests that Other Mommy is attracted to Bela's innocence and might lose interest if Bela is exposed to a painful adult secret. At Sleeping Bear Dunes, Ursula tells Bela that she was married to an older man, Douglas Cain, when she began an affair with Russ and became pregnant. A paternity test showed that Douglas, not Russ, is Bela's biological father, although Russ chose to raise her.

Devastated, Bela concludes that the adults around her have deceived her. She falsely tells them that Other Mommy has disappeared, but sees the entity in Lake Michigan the following morning.

After returning home, Ruth compares the human heart to a house with many rooms and warns Bela to be careful about what she allows inside. That night, Bela realizes that the figure beside her is Other Mommy impersonating Ruth. She hides in a closet and discovers Ruth's body. Using Ruth's voice, the entity lures Russ and Ursula upstairs. After hearing a struggle, Bela finds her parents lying face down and unresponsive.

Believing she is alone and wanting companionship, Bela returns to her bedroom. Other Mommy again asks to enter her heart, and Bela finally agrees. She finds herself in an immense, empty space while hearing the entity practice her voice, indicating that Other Mommy has possessed her body and assumed her place in the human world.

== Reception ==
Publishers Weekly described the novel as containing predictable but nevertheless eerie scares. The review identified Bela's naive narrative voice as its strongest feature, stating that it refreshed the familiar premise and strengthened the atmosphere of dread.

Kirkus Reviews criticized the novel's lengthy monologues and limited characterization of Bela, but found that Malerman maintained the reader's attention.

Lila Denning of Library Journal praised Malerman's ability to turn ordinary situations into sources of fear and considered Bela's narrative voice believable. She recommended the novel to readers of Neil Gaiman, Catriona Ward, Paul Tremblay and Scott Thomas.

Neil McRobert included the novel in Esquire's list of the best horror books of 2024. He praised its claustrophobic atmosphere, restricted perspective and narrative efficiency, calling it “the most purely effective horror novel” he had read.

== Awards and nominations ==
Year	Award	Category	Result	Ref.
2024	Bram Stoker Awards	Superior Achievement in a Novel	Nominated	
2025	Locus Award	Best Horror Novel	Finalist	

== Film adaptation ==
In April 2025, it was announced that Universal Pictures and Blumhouse-Atomic Monster were developing a film adaptation, with Rob Savage directing, James Wan producing and Jessica Chastain starring in the film.

The film was subsequently titled Other Mommy. Chastain portrays both Ursula and the entity after it assumes Ursula's appearance. Arabella Olivia Clark portrays Bela and Jay Duplass portrays Russ. The cast also includes Dichen Lachman, Arian Moayed and Karen Allen. Universal Pictures theatrically released the film in the United States on October 9, 2026.
