= Simultaneous (novel) =

Novel by Eric Heisserer

Simultaneous is a thriller novel written by Eric Heisserer combining science fiction, paranormal and detective fiction themes. It presents the idea that reincarnation is possible, but that there are a limited number of souls, so that in modern times with a population in the billions, many people share the same soul.

== Plot ==
Grant Lukather is an Federal Special Agent, in the Predictive Analytics Unit of the Department of Homeland Security, a unit often derided as call-in service for psychics. He investigates a 911 call warning of a fatal gas explosion in New Mexico, which was made before the explosion happened. He traces the call to a hypnotherapist in California, Sarah Newcomb, who specializes in "past life regression". Sarah claims that her patient, Marigold Chu, shares her soul with Brian Huntley, a detective in Denver, Colorado, and that she can relive her past as his future, so that under hypnosis she has access to his memories of things that have not yet happened. His soul, Sarah claims, returned in time after his death to inhabit Marigold. Sarah believes that there are only a billion souls, so in a world of over 8 billion humans, many people must share souls.

As a test, Sarah has Marigold tap Brian's "memory" of a basketball game taking place later in the day. When the game happens as predicted, they decide to explore further. Grant attempts to change Brian's future by finding his house and slashing one of his car's tires. However, this shift in the timeline causes Marigold to have a seizure and be taken to hospital.

One of Brian's regrets at the end of his life was his failure to catch a copycat killer, recreating the crimes of the so-called "Ash Killer", who left a smudge of ash on the foreheads of his victims. The real killer, Leonard Church, is already in prison for his crimes. Knowing the time and location of the next murder, they attempt to change the future by intervening to stop the killer. While they fail to stop the murder, the killer is caught.

Grant goes to interview Leonard Church, but finds himself having to trade information to get answers. Church seems to know more about what happened in Denver than he should. He knows when Grant is lying about the names of his associates. He believes in the same theory of reincarnation as Sarah, with one extra feature: the ash he used, he claims, ejects the soul from every body it inhabits, which he finds more satisfying than just killing one person. Church also hints that he, and the copycat, are not the only Ash Killers.

With more killers apparently on the loose, and Grant, Sarah, and even Marigold being potential targets, they must survive without knowing who may be the next attacker.

Grant and Sarah are also dealing with their own pasts. Grant is mourning the death of his wife, trapped in their burning house during a wildfire outbreak. Sarah still suffers from her treatment at the hands of her father. Grant is attracted to Sarah despite his need to remain professional. Like Grant's late wife, Sarah is a painter. Marigold sought treatment from Sarah after experiencing losses of time, which started with the first copycat killing, though she had experienced strong deja vu throughout her life and had joined support groups centered on it. Detective Brian Huntley drinks too much and also smokes heavily. His drinking sometimes makes him late to a crime scene. In the final chapter Marigold experiences his final days again, but years later than before, after he adopted healthier habits.

== Reviews ==
Kirkus Reviews gave a generally favorable report, concluding, "Sarah and Grant toss pretty much every protocol about how therapists and law enforcement officers are supposed to behave right out the window; if you’re willing to suspend disbelief about that and communal souls, this is a suspenseful and fast-paced tale."
