= Bird Box Barcelona =

2023 American-Spanish film

- Promotional release poster
- Directed by: Álex Pastor; David Pastor
- Written by: Álex Pastor; David Pastor
- Based on: Bird Box by Josh Malerman
- Produced by: Dylan Clark; Núria Valls; Adrián Guerra; Chris Morgan; Ryan Lewis; Josh Malerman
- Starring: Mario Casas; Naila Schuberth; Georgina Campbell; Diego Calva
- Cinematography: Daniel Aranyó
- Edited by: Martí Roca
- Music by: Zeltia Montes
- Production companies: Nostromo Pictures; Chris Morgan Productions; Dylan Clark Productions
- Distributed by: Netflix
- Release date: July 14, 2023
- Running time: 112 minutes
- Countries: United States; Spain
- Languages: Spanish; English; German

Bird Box Barcelona is a 2023 post-apocalyptic horror film directed and written by Álex and David Pastor. A spin-off sequel to the 2018 film Bird Box, adapted from Josh Malerman's 2014 novel of the same name, the film stars Mario Casas, Naila Schuberth, Georgina Campbell and Diego Calva, and follows Sebastián and his daughter as they begin their own great adventure of survival in Barcelona after an entity of mysterious origin almost annihilates the world's population by causing those who observe it to take their lives.

Bird Box Barcelona was released on Netflix on July 14, 2023, to mixed reviews.

== Plot ==
The world is plagued by mysterious entities that manipulate people's negative emotions, turning some into "seers" but leading most people to die by suicide once they have seen an entity. A standard prevention method is wearing a blindfold outdoors. In Barcelona, Spain, Sebastián and his daughter Anna travel together. One day, Sebastián encounters a group of survivors and claims he knows the location of generators that can provide light and heating. Sebastián joins the others in their shelter inside a bus hangar. The next morning, with everyone asleep inside a bus, Sebastián drives it outside and crashes it. Everyone is left without blindfolds; Sebastián slowly leads each to open their eyes, and upon witnessing the entities, they die by suicide. Sebastián is revealed to be a seer and is thus unaffected. Anna congratulates Sebastián on having "saved" the people, urging him to find the other "lost sheep".

Nine months earlier, the arrival of the entities prompted people to flee. Sebastián retrieved Anna but lost his wife in a car accident. They found refuge in a church and met Esteban, a pastor who opined that the entities are angels, and that humanity should be liberated from suffering by embracing death. Sebastián and Anna tried to hide, but one day a group of seers led by the pastor discovered their hiding place and captured them. He forced Anna to open her eyes, killing her. Sebastián then faced the entities, but instead of death, he saw the apparition of Anna, which has accompanied him ever since. Anna tells him he can join his family there when he has "saved" enough people on Earth.

Sebastián encounters another group led by Rafa, who has two dogs. Others in the group include Octavio, a Mexican deliveryman with expertise in physics; Roberto and Isabel, a couple; Claire, an English psychiatrist; and Sofia, a young German girl separated from her mother and under Claire's care. Octavio theorizes that the entities are quantum beings that perceive humans' fear and grief. Sofia shares information about Montjuïc Castle, believed to be a safe refuge which can be reached by a gondola lift. The group embarks on a quest to reach the Castle.

Rafa dies early on after Sebastián sabotages the dog leashes, and the remainder of the group takes shelter. Sebastián leads Octavio to his death, but begins to doubt the wisdom of Anna's apparition. Roberto and Isabel lose their lives too. Claire suspects Sebastián is a seer and shields Sofia from him. Sebastián, who had started resisting Anna's influence due to bonding with Sofia, vows to protect Claire and Sofia.

Meanwhile, Padre and his followers find the trio. Sebastián helps Claire and Sofia get to the gondola lift, then fights Esteban, and they kill each other; Sebastián dies smiling. Claire and Sofia are able to get on the lift and enter Montjuïc, revealed to have been converted into a secret camp for survivors that is overseen by the military. As they are escorted in, Sofia's mother, who also made it to the camp, sees her and the two are reunited. Claire undergoes blood tests by scientists trying to develop an antibody that can provide immunity against the entities' influence.

It is revealed that the army has captured one of the creatures and a seer, and are using the seer's blood to try and create an antibody.

== Cast ==
- Mario Casas as Sebastián
- Alejandra Howard as Anna
- Georgina Campbell as Claire
- Naila Schuberth as Sofia
- Diego Calva as Octavio
- Leonardo Sbaraglia as Father Esteban (Padre Esteban in Spanish)
- Lola Dueñas as Isabel
- Patrick Criado as Rafa
- Gonzalo de Castro as Roberto
- Michelle Jenner as Liliana
- Celia Freijeiro as Laura

== Production ==
=== Development ===
A Spanish spin-off of Bird Box was reported in March 2021 with Nostromo Pictures producing the project. The film is written and directed by Álex Pastor and David Pastor, with Dylan Clark, Núria Valls, Adrián Guerra, Chris Morgan, Ryan Lewis, and Josh Malerman as producers and Brian Williams and Ainsley Davies executive producing.

=== Casting ===
In October 2021, Mario Casas, Georgina Campbell, Diego Calva, Alejandra Howard, Naila Schuberth, Patrick Criado, Celia Freijeiro with Lola Dueñas, Gonzalo de Castro, Michelle Jenner and Leonardo Sbaraglia were revealed to be cast in the film.

=== Filming ===
In January 2022, principal photography was reported to have commenced in Spain.

== Release ==
The film was available to view on Netflix from July 14, 2023.

== Reception ==
Bird Box Barcelona received mixed reviews from critics. On the review aggregator website Rotten Tomatoes, 53% of 79 critics' reviews are positive, with an average rating of 5.6/10. The website's consensus reads: "Expanding the franchise with some effective twists, Bird Box Barcelona lacks some of its predecessor's creepy tension but remains occasionally involving in its own right." Metacritic reports a 47 out of 100 score, based on 22 reviews, indicating "mixed or average" reviews.

== See also ==
- List of Spanish films of 2023
