= 47 Ronin (2013 film) =

- Theatrical release poster
- Directed by: Carl Rinsch
- Screenplay by: Chris Morgan; Hossein Amini
- Story by: Chris Morgan; Walter Hamada
- Produced by: Pamela Abdy; Eric McLeod
- Starring: Keanu Reeves; Hiroyuki Sanada; Tadanobu Asano; Rinko Kikuchi; Ko Shibasaki
- Cinematography: John Mathieson
- Edited by: Stuart Baird
- Music by: Ilan Eshkeri
- Production companies: H2F Entertainment; Mid Atlantic Films; Moving Picture Company; DMG Entertainment; Warrior Productions; Stuber Productions; Relativity Media
- Distributed by: Universal Pictures
- Release dates: December 6, 2013 (Japan); December 25, 2013 (United States)
- Running time: 118 minutes
- Country: United States
- Languages: English; Japanese
- Budget: $175–225 million
- Box office: $151.8 million

47 Ronin is a 2013 American historical fantasy action film directed by Carl Rinsch in his sole theatrical directorial effort. Written by Chris Morgan and Hossein Amini from a story conceived by Morgan and Walter Hamada, the film is a work of Chūshingura ("The Treasury of Loyal Retainers"), a fictionalized account of the forty-seven rōnin, a real-life group of masterless samurai in 18th-century Japan who avenged the death of their daimyō Asano Naganori by battling his rival Kira Yoshinaka. Starring Keanu Reeves in the lead role along with Hiroyuki Sanada, Tadanobu Asano, Rinko Kikuchi and Ko Shibasaki, the film bears little resemblance to its historical basis compared to previous adaptations, and instead serves as a stylized interpretation set "in a world of witches and giants."

Development on the film began in 2008 with Rinsch, who had previously filmed "visual and stylish" commercials for various companies, signing on to direct the following year. After five Japanese actors were cast alongside Reeves between March and April 2011, filming took place in Budapest the same month before moving to Shepperton Studios in England, while additional filming in Japan was planned. Reshoots took place in London in August 2012.

47 Ronin first premiered in Japan on December 6, 2013, before being released theatrically in the United States on December 25, 2013, by Universal Pictures in both 3D and 2D formats. Upon release, 47 Ronin was panned by critics and grossed a total of $151.8 million against its production budget of $175–225 million, becoming a box-office bomb that left Universal in the red for 2013. Variety listed 47 Ronin as one of "Hollywood's biggest box office bombs of 2013".

A standalone sequel, Blade of the 47 Ronin, was released on October 25, 2022, on Netflix.

== Plot ==
In late-medieval Japan, Kai is a teenage English-Japanese outcast found in the woods near Wakkanai and adopted by Lord Asano, the benevolent ruler of the Akō Domain. Kai and Asano's daughter, Mika, fall in love despite the scorn her father's samurai hold for Kai's mixed ancestry. Lord Kira, the Shōgun's master of ceremonies, seeks to take control of Akō with the help of Mizuki, a shapeshifting kitsune. She sends a kirin to kill Asano and his men on a hunting trip, but Kai takes up a fallen sword and slays the monster. He sees a white fox with different-colored eyes. When the Shōgun Tokugawa Tsunayoshi visits Akō, Kai notices a concubine with the same multi-colored eyes and recognizes her as an enchantress. He tries to warn Asano's principal counselor, Oishi, about the witch in Kira's household but is dismissed.

For the entertainment of the Shōgun, Kira arranges a duel between his best warrior, a golem, and Asano's chosen combatant, whom Mizuki incapacitates with magic just before the contest. Kai dons his armor to fight in his stead but is unmasked during the duel, and the Shōgun orders him to be severely beaten. That night, Mizuki bewitches Asano into believing Kira is raping Mika, causing him to attack the unarmed lord. Sentenced to death, Asano is compelled to perform seppuku to preserve his honor. The Shōgun gives Kira domain over Akō and decrees Mika must marry him but grants her one year of mourning before the wedding. The Shōgun brands Oishi and his men rōnin, forbidding them from avenging Asano. Kira has Oishi imprisoned and Kai sold into slavery.

Nearly a year later, Oishi is released by his captors, who believe him now harmless. Having realized that Kira used sorcery to frame Asano, Oishi and his son Chikara reunite the scattered rōnin and rescue Kai from the fighting pits of the Dutch colony of Dejima. Kai leads them to the mystical Tengu Forest, from which he long ago fled, to obtain the special blades of the Tengu. Kai warns Oishi not to draw his sword inside the Tengu temple as he goes deeper inside to face the Tengu Master who once trained him. Alone, Oishi sees an illusion of his men and son being slaughtered by the Tengu but resists the urge to draw his sword, while Kai bests his former master. Having proven themselves worthy, the rōnin receive their blades.

They plan to ambush Kira on his pilgrimage to a shrine, but the procession is a trap, and most of the rōnin are killed. Mistakenly believing they are all dead, Mizuki presents Kira with Oishi's sword and taunts Mika with their deaths. Half the remaining rōnin infiltrate Kira's castle disguised as a band of wedding performers, while the other half scale the castle walls and covertly attack the guards. Finally Oishi fights Kira while Kai and Mika face Mizuki as a dragon, when Kai must at last draw on the mystical powers of the Tengu to kill her. When Oishi emerges with Kira's severed head, Kira's retainers surrender.

The rōnin and Kai surrender and are sentenced to death, having violated the Shōgun's prohibition on avenging Asano. However, the Shōgun declares that they followed the principles of bushido, restoring their honor as samurai and allowing them to perform seppuku and receive the honor of burial with Asano. The Shōgun returns the domain of Akō to Mika and pardons Chikara so that he may preserve Oishi's bloodline and serve Akō. As Mika mourns Kai's death, she remembers that he will search through 1,000 worlds and 10,000 lifetimes until he finds her.

== Cast ==
- Keanu Reeves as Kai, a half-Japanese, half-English outcast adopted by the household of Lord Asano, who joins the Rōnin. The character was created for the film.
  - Daniel Barber as teen Kai
- Hiroyuki Sanada as Yoshio Oishi, the leader of the Rōnin.
- Tadanobu Asano as Lord Yoshinaka Kira, Lord Asano's rival daimyō.
- Rinko Kikuchi as Mizuki the Witch, an odd-eyed sorceress who serves Lord Kira.
- Ko Shibasaki as Mika Asano, Lord Asano's daughter and Kai's love interest.
  - Arisa Maekawa as teen Mika
- Min Tanaka as Lord Naganori Asano, the former master of the Rōnin, and Mika's father.
- Cary-Hiroyuki Tagawa as Shōgun Tsunayoshi Tokugawa
- Jin Akanishi as Chikara Oishi, Oishi's son.
- Masayoshi Haneda as Yasuno
- Hiroshi Sogabe as Hazama
- Takato Yonemoto as Basho
- Hiroshi Yamada as Hara
- Yorick van Wageningen as Kapitan
- Masayuki Deai as Isogai
- Shu Nakajima as Horibe
- Togo Igawa as Tengu Lord
- Natsuki Kunimoto as Riku
- Gedde Watanabe as Kabuki troupe leader
- Rick Genest as foreman
- Ron Bottitta as narrator

== Production ==
=== Development ===
47 Ronin was first announced in December 2008, with Keanu Reeves attached to star and Chris Morgan writing the script, which appeared in the 2008 Black List of best unproduced screenplays. According to Variety, the film would "tell a stylized version of the story, mixing fantasy elements of the sort seen in The Lord of the Rings pics, with gritty battle scenes akin to those in films such as Gladiator." Universal Pictures planned to produce the film in 2009 after hiring a director, and entered talks with Carl Rinsch, who has previously filmed "visual and stylish" commercials for various companies, to direct in November of that year.

In December 2010, the studio announced that the film would be produced and released in 3D. Between March and April 2011, five Japanese actors - Hiroyuki Sanada, Tadanobu Asano, Rinko Kikuchi, Ko Shibasaki and Jin Akanishi - were cast alongside Reeves, as Universal wanted the film to be more authentic instead of casting actors more recognizable in the United States. Universal provided Rinsch with a production budget of $175 million for the film despite his inexperience with feature-length films, which was considered by The Hollywood Reporter to be a "large-scale, downright risky" move on behalf of the studio.

=== Filming ===
Principal photography for the film began on March 14, 2011 in Budapest. Origo Film Group contributed to the film. Production moved to Shepperton Studios in the United Kingdom while additional filming in Japan was planned. Reeves revealed that various scenes were first filmed in the Japanese language to familiarize the cast, and were then filmed again in English. The film featured a total of 998 costumes and 400 suits of armour designed by British costume designer Penny Rose, who stated that "We decided to base it on the culture and what the shapes should be—i.e., everyone's in a kimono—but we've thrown a kind of fashion twist at it. And we've made it full of color, which is quite unusual for me."

Reshoots were done in London in late August 2012, which were delayed by the 2012 Summer Olympics and the filming of Reeves' directorial debut, Man of Tai Chi. Universal pulled Rinsch from the project during the editing stages in late 2012, with Universal chairwoman Donna Langley taking over the editing process. In addition, the studio added a love scene, extra close-ups and individual lines of dialogue to try and boost Reeves' presence in the film, which "significantly added" to the film's budget.

=== Music ===
47 Ronin: Original Motion Picture Soundtrack is a soundtrack album containing the film score composed by Ilan Eshkeri, which was released on December 17, 2013, by Varèse Sarabande.

== Release ==
47 Ronin was originally scheduled to be released on November 21, 2012, but was delayed to February 8, 2013 due to the need for work on the 3D effects. It was moved once more to a final release date of December 25, 2013, due to the need for work on the reshoots and post-production.

An endorsement from the cast of Sengoku Basara was held until January 23, 2014, stating that Japanese fans who tweet with the hashtag #RONIN_BASARA could win a copy of Sengoku Basara 4 for the PlayStation 3 or a 47 Ronin poster signed by the film's cast.

=== Home media ===
Universal Pictures Home Entertainment released 47 Ronin on DVD, Blu-ray and Blu-ray 3D on April 1, 2014.

== Reception ==
=== Box office ===
47 Ronin originally premiered in Japan on December 6, 2013, where it opened to 753 screens and grossed an estimated $1.3 million, opening in third place behind Lupin the 3rd vs. Detective Conan: The Movie and Kaguya-hime no Monogatari (The Tale of Princess Kaguya). Variety reported that the Japanese debut was "troubling", considering the well-known local cast and the fact that the film is loosely based on a famous Japanese tale. The evening tabloid newspaper Nikkan Gendai reported that its dismal performance were "unheard-of numbers" generated by the Japanese distaste for a Hollywood rendition of Chūshingura, which bore little resemblance to the renowned historical epic.

In the United States, the film grossed $20.6 million in five days after its release on Christmas Day 2013, opening in ninth place and facing heavy competition from Frozen, The Hobbit: The Desolation of Smaug, Anchorman 2: The Legend Continues, The Wolf of Wall Street, American Hustle, Saving Mr. Banks, The Secret Life of Walter Mitty and The Hunger Games: Catching Fire. In the United Kingdom, the film grossed $2.3 million upon debuting in fifth place. The film was a box-office bomb, unable to recover its $175 million production budget.

=== Critical response ===
47 Ronin was panned by film critics, failing to impress Japanese audiences where studio expectations were high. On Rotten Tomatoes, the film holds a 16% approval rating based on 88 reviews, with an average score of 4.20/10. The critical consensus reads: "47 Ronin is a surprisingly dull fantasy adventure, one that leaves its talented international cast stranded within one-dimensional roles." On Metacritic, the film has a score of 28 out of 100 based on 21 critics, indicating "generally unfavorable" reviews. Audiences polled by CinemaScore gave the film an average grade of "B+" on an A+ to F scale.

Kirsten Acuña of Business Insider stated that the film flopped for three reasons: first, it opened in December when there is an oversaturation of films for the Christmas season; second, the film took "too long in the vault" after having undergone editing and lost momentum as a result; and third, audiences had not been drawn to Reeves as an actor since The Matrix Revolutions (which was released ten years prior) and that he had not yet reestablished his stardom prior to making John Wick.

=== Accolades ===
Award	Category	Recipient	Result	Ref.
40th Saturn Awards	Best Costume	Penny Rose	Nominated	
40th Saturn Awards	Best Production Design	Jan Roelfs	Nominated	
IGN Awards	Best Fantasy Movie and Best 3D Movie	47 Ronin	Nominated	
Golden Reel Award	Best Sound Editing - Music in a Feature Film	Andrew Silver (supervising music editor), Kenneth Karman (music editor), Julie Pearce (music editor), and Peter Oso Snell (music editor)	Nominated	

== Sequel ==
A stand-alone sequel, titled Blade of the 47 Ronin, was released exclusively on Netflix on October 25, 2022.
