= Bird Box (film) =

2018 film directed by Susanne Bier

- Official release poster
- Directed by: Susanne Bier
- Screenplay by: Eric Heisserer
- Based on: Bird Box by Josh Malerman
- Produced by: Dylan Clark; Chris Morgan; Clayton Townsend
- Starring: Sandra Bullock; Trevante Rhodes; Jacki Weaver; Rosa Salazar; Danielle Macdonald; Lil Rel Howery; Tom Hollander; Colson Baker; BD Wong; Pruitt Taylor Vince; Sarah Paulson; John Malkovich
- Cinematography: Salvatore Totino
- Edited by: Ben Lester
- Music by: Trent Reznor; Atticus Ross
- Production companies: Bluegrass Films; Chris Morgan Productions
- Distributed by: Netflix
- Release dates: November 12, 2018 (AFI Fest); December 14, 2018 (United States)
- Running time: 124 minutes
- Country: United States
- Language: English
- Budget: $19.8 million

Bird Box is a 2018 American post-apocalyptic horror thriller film directed by Susanne Bier and written by Eric Heisserer. Based on the 2014 novel by Josh Malerman, the film features an ensemble cast which includes Sandra Bullock, Trevante Rhodes, Jacki Weaver, Rosa Salazar, Danielle Macdonald, Lil Rel Howery, Tom Hollander, Colson Baker, BD Wong, Pruitt Taylor Vince, Sarah Paulson, and John Malkovich. The film follows the character Malorie Hayes (Bullock) as she tries to protect herself and two children from entities that cause people who look at them to kill themselves.

Bird Box had its world premiere at the AFI Fest on November 12, 2018, and began a limited release on December 14, before streaming worldwide on Netflix on December 21, 2018. Despite mixed reviews from critics, the film became the most-watched film on Netflix at the time within 28 days of release, according to Netflix. A spin-off sequel, Bird Box Barcelona, was released on Netflix on July 14, 2023.

== Plot ==
In a post-apocalyptic world, Malorie Hayes informs two young children that they are going down the river in a rowboat. She sternly instructs them not to remove their blindfolds, or they will die. The film then cuts between the events of the start of the pandemic and the events of present.

Five years earlier, a pregnant Malorie was visited by her sister, Jessica. A news broadcast reported unexplained mass suicides spreading across Europe and Asia. After a prenatal checkup, Malorie witnesses a woman smashing her head repeatedly into the hospital window. Others start acting suicidal, as well, causing panic and chaos. Malorie and Jessica leave hurriedly. Driving away from the hospital, Jessica sees something inexplicable, which drives her insane, so she deliberately crashes the car. She then intentionally walks in front of a speeding truck. As Malorie flees on foot, a woman offers her shelter. The woman then sees the entity, goes into a trance, and sits inside a burning car. Passing by, Tom picks up Malorie from the street and brings her to a house where six others – Douglas, Greg, Cheryl, Felix, Charlie, and Lucy – are taking shelter.

Charlie says that humanity has been judged, so the appearance of demonic entities is a sign of the end times. He mentions those spiritual beings have different names in various cultures, such as Aka Manah, Surgat, Huli Jing, and Púca. They cover all of the house's windows and blindfold themselves whenever going out. As new pregnant survivor Olympia arrives, Greg kills himself after testing to see if observing the entities indirectly through surveillance cameras is safe. Half of the group goes to the grocery store Charlie worked at for supplies. They drive there in a car with covered windows using a GPS navigation system. Malorie gets three live birds with their supplies, as the entities' presence agitates them.

Later, Charlie's coworker attacks the group, attempting to force them to look at the creatures. However, Charlie sacrifices himself to save them. They make it back to the house. Sometime later, Felix and Lucy steal the car. Olympia lets stranger Gary into the house against Douglas's wishes. He explains that he escaped from a group of unblindfolded survivors, who, driven insane from seeing the entities, try to force others to look at them. When Douglas tries to force Gary to leave, Cheryl knocks Douglas out, and they lock him in the garage.

As Olympia and Malorie go into labor simultaneously, Gary sketches the entities, revealing he has seen them and gone insane. He knocks Tom unconscious and opens the garage door, exposing Douglas to the entities. Gary goes upstairs and uncovers all the windows. Olympia fails to look away, and after witnessing the creature, dives out the window, killing herself. Malorie hides with both newborns under a cover, while Gary forces Cheryl to look at the entities, causing her to stab herself in the neck with a pair of scissors. Douglas escapes the garage and blindly attempts to kill Gary with a shotgun, wounding him in the process, but Gary kills him with the scissors. Tom begins to recuperate shortly after, fighting Gary over the gun. After Malorie hears gunshots, Tom lets her know everything is fine.

Five years later, Tom and Malorie live together with the children, "Boy" and "Girl". They receive transmissions from survivors informing them of a safe community hidden in the forest, accessible by boat along the river. As they leave their house, a group of unblindfolded survivors attacks them. Tom distracts them so Malorie and the children can flee. He uncovers his eyes and sees the entities, but manages to eliminate all attackers before killing himself. Malorie and the children go blindfolded down the river on a boat, carrying the birds to warn them of the entities. They encounter several obstacles, including an unblindfolded survivor and river rapids. Soon after the three reach shore, they are separated when Malorie accidentally slides down a hill. The entities nearly trick the children into uncovering their eyes. Regaining consciousness, Malorie tells the children she loves them and where to find her. They eventually reach the community, a former school for the blind. Malorie releases the birds and finally names the children Tom and Olympia, declaring that she is their mother. She also happily sees her obstetrician Dr. Lapham is among the survivors.

== Cast ==
- Sandra Bullock as Malorie Hayes
- Trevante Rhodes as Tom
- Jacki Weaver as Cheryl
- John Malkovich as Douglas
- Sarah Paulson as Jessica Hayes
- Rosa Salazar as Lucy
- Danielle Macdonald as Olympia
- Lil Rel Howery as Charlie
- Tom Hollander as Gary
- Machine Gun Kelly as Felix
- BD Wong as Greg
- Pruitt Taylor Vince as Rick
- Vivien Lyra Blair as Girl / Olympia
- Julian Edwards as Boy / Tom
- Parminder Nagra as Dr. Lapham
- Rebecca Pidgeon as Lydia
- Amy Gumenick as Samantha
- Taylor Handley as Jason
- Happy Anderson as River Man
- David Dastmalchian as Whistling Marauder

== Production ==
=== Development ===
The film rights to Bird Box were optioned by Universal Pictures in 2013, prior to the book's release. Scott Stuber and Chris Morgan were set to produce the film, with Andy Muschietti attached as director. Eric Heisserer was in negotiations to write the script. In July 2017, after Stuber became head of the feature-film division of Netflix, Netflix announced it had acquired the rights to the book and would develop the film, with Sandra Bullock and John Malkovich starring. Susanne Bier was announced as the director.

=== Casting ===
In July 2017, Sandra Bullock and John Malkovich were cast in the film as Malorie Hayes and Douglas. In October 2017, Danielle Macdonald, Trevante Rhodes, Jacki Weaver, Sarah Paulson, Rosa Salazar, Lil Rel Howery, and Amy Gumenick joined the cast. In November 2017, Machine Gun Kelly and David Dastmalchian were also added.

=== Filming ===
Principal photography began in California in October 2017. Wilderness scenes were shot on the Smith River in the far northern part of the state. The house exterior is from a place in Monrovia. Filming partially took place in Santa Cruz, and the final scene was shot at Scripps College in Claremont.

The production used live birds during filming as much as possible, replacing them digitally for sequences when they became "agitated".

The film originally used footage of the Lac-Mégantic rail disaster, which caused the death of 47 people in the town of Lac-Mégantic, Quebec, on July 6, 2013. Netflix later replaced the footage with an outtake from a canceled U.S. TV series. The same footage was also used in another Netflix production, Travelers, but has since been removed.

=== Visual effects ===
The visual effects were created by Industrial Light & Magic and supervised by Marcus Taormina.

=== Music ===
Trent Reznor and Atticus Ross (of Nine Inch Nails) were hired to score the film. The soundtrack album itself was released about two weeks after the release of the film, on January 1, 2019. It was first released for sale only on Nine Inch Nails's website, and later on iTunes, Apple Music, Spotify, and other platforms. The released version consisted of 10 tracks, totaling an hour and six minutes of music. In a statement on the Nine Inch Nails website, Reznor said:

Like all soundtrack records we release, we aim for these to play like albums that take you on a journey and can exist as companion pieces to the films and as their own separate works. We created a significant amount of music and conceptual sound for Bird Box, a lot of which never made it to your ears in the final version of the film. We've decided to present you with this version of the soundtrack record that represents what Bird Box is to us. We hope you enjoy. For those interested, we will be releasing a more expansive (read: more self-indulgent) physical-only offering this spring that will contain an additional hour of music and artwork that colors further outside the lines ...

The full version of the soundtrack was released on November 22, 2019, exclusively on a special-edition vinyl box set (with a digital download at purchase). The full version contains 13 more tracks and an extra hour of music, resulting in a two-hour (plus six minutes), 23-track album.

In December 2019, Reznor criticized Bird Box producers over their use of his and Ross's music, and the film editor over making an inadequately low mix of the music in the film, calling the experience a "fucking waste of time".

== Release ==
The film had its world premiere at the AFI Fest on November 12, 2018. However, due to the Woolsey Fire that hit California and out of respect for the victims of the Thousand Oaks shooting, Netflix cancelled AFI Fest's red carpet coverage scheduled for the premiere. The film began a limited theatrical run on December 14, 2018, before streaming on Netflix on December 21, 2018.

== Reception ==
=== Critical response ===
On review aggregator Rotten Tomatoes, the film holds an approval rating of 64% based on 173 reviews, with an average rating of 5.8/10. The website's critical consensus reads, "Bird Box never quite reaches its intriguing potential, but strong acting and an effectively chilly mood offer intermittently creepy compensation." On Metacritic, the film has a weighted average score of 51 out of 100, based on 26 critics, indicating "mixed or average" reviews.

Brian Tallerico from RogerEbert.com said, "Most of the problems with Bird Box come back to a thin screenplay, one that too often gives its characters flat, expository dialogue and then writes itself into a corner with a climax that's just silly when it needs to be tense." Amy Nicholson, in a review for British newspaper The Guardian, gave a negative appraisal, awarding the film two out of five stars and concluding, "as the film staggers on in its quest to give us entertainment satisfaction or death, we're tempted to identify with the movie's first victim, a woman in a tracksuit banging her head against the glass, ready to get this painful sight over with." Writing for Forbes, Sarah Aswell described the movie as one "that embraces everything about the (horror genre) formula, both good and bad—this movie has moments of true, delightful, fright, but it also has some of the corniness and shallowness that many horror movies can't shake." Aisha Harris of The New York Times found the film occasionally riveting but overall disappointing.

=== Audience viewership ===
According to Nielsen, Bird Box was watched by nearly 26 million viewers in its first seven days of release in the United States. It also revealed that a significant part of its audience was young – aged 18 to 34 (36%) – female (57%), and either African American (24%) or Latino (22%). Netflix also released its own viewing figure that gave a worldwide audience of more than 45 million in seven days, with views defined by the company as the film streaming for over 70% of its time. The viewing figure was claimed to be the best ever for a Netflix film. This audience figure released by Netflix was met with skepticism from some analysts, who cited a lack of independent verification of the view count. In July 2020, Netflix revealed the film had in-fact been watched by 89 million households over its first four weeks of release, the second-most ever for one of their original films. A Barclays study deduced that, had the film received a traditional theatrical release, it would have grossed about $98 million worldwide. Bird Box became the most-watched film on Netflix within 28 days of its release, with 282.02 million hours being viewed. It retained this position until being displaced by Red Notice in 2021.

=== Accolades ===
Award	Date of ceremony	Category	Recipient(s) and nominee(s)	Result	Ref(s)
Visual Effects Society Awards	February 5, 2019	Outstanding Supporting Visual Effects in a Photoreal Feature	Marcus Taormina, David Robinson, Mark Bakowski, Sophie Dawes and Mike Meinardus	Nominated	
Artios Awards	January 30, 2020	Film – Non-Theatrical Release	Mary Vernieu, Michelle Wade Byrd and Jina Jay	Nominated	

=== Miscellaneous ===
On September 28, 2025, the film was illegally shown by local Brazilian TV station TV Gazeta de Alagoas, a television station in Maceió, Alagoas, Brazil, to fill the programming schedule after the station had lost its TV Globo affiliation the day before and being replaced by TV Globo as an affiliate with TV Asa Branca Alagoas, a brand new station. Netflix then proceeded to sue TV Gazeta de Alagoas.

== Bird Box challenge ==
The Bird Box challenge was an internet challenge that gained popularity in late 2018 and early 2019 in which participants took part in tasks while blindfolded, based on Bird Box. The challenge is similar to those of its time in internet culture, including the ice bucket challenge, mannequin challenge, and Tide Pod challenge.

In Australia, Netflix originally partnered with four Twitch streamers in November 2018, performing what they called a Bird Box challenge, in which they would play some popular video games while blindfolded.

Netflix
(@netflix)
tweeted:

Can’t believe I have to say this, but: PLEASE DO NOT HURT YOURSELVES WITH THIS BIRD BOX CHALLENGE. We don’t know how this started, and we appreciate the love, but Boy and Girl have just one wish for 2019 and it is that you not end up in the hospital due to memes.

January 2, 2019

However, the challenge became widely mimicked on the Internet by individuals wearing blindfolds while trying to do ordinary activities, causing injuries to some. One video posted on December 24 depicted a toddler running into a wall while doing the challenge with his family. YouTuber Morgan Adams gained 1.7 million views for her "24 Hour Bird Box Challenge" video, posted on December 30. On January 2, the Netflix account on Twitter posted a cautionary plea for internet users not to injure themselves while partaking in the challenge. The New York Times stated that there were no reports of serious injury at the time.

On January 7, YouTuber Jake Paul appeared to drive while blindfolded as part of his own 24-hour Bird Box challenge video, directly violating YouTube's community guidelines, which prohibited the promotion of dangerous activities, though did include a small "do not try this at home" caption at the bottom of his screen and a disclaimer in the description box of the video. The same day, a 17-year-old driver in Utah crashed into another car while taking part in the challenge after driving into oncoming traffic; no injuries occurred. Police Lieutenant Travis Luman responded, "it's just inexcusable to do something as dangerous as this, not only to yourself, but [also to] everyone else on the road."

On January 14, British Transport Police began an investigation into YouTuber Ben Phillips after he uploaded a video on his channel that included his partner Elliot Giles standing blindfolded on a railway track for the challenge, which is a criminal act. The Daily Telegraph reported on January 14 that the video had been watched almost 200,000 times since it was uploaded on the previous day; police warned of potential copycat incidents. YouTube updated its policies the next day, stating that challenges "that [could] cause death and/or have caused death in some instances", pranks "with a perceived danger of serious physical injury", and anything that caused "children severe emotional distress" were prohibited on the site. They did not specifically mention the Bird Box challenge, instead citing the Tide Pod challenge, which had taken place the previous year.

== Sequel ==
In July 2020, a sequel was announced as being in development. In March 2021, the film was set to be receiving a Spanish-language spin-off film from writers Álex and David Pastor as "the first of multiple local-language Bird Box spinoffs" set in the same universe. Bird Box: Barcelona was released on Netflix on July 14, 2023, with Mario Casas, Diego Calva, and Georgina Campbell in main roles.

== See also ==
- Blood List
