= Carl Rinsch =

American filmmaker

- Born: Carl Erik Rinsch; 1976 or 1977 (age 48–49); Los Angeles, California, U.S.
- Education: Brown University; Columbia University
- Occupation: Director
- Years active: 2010–2021
- Spouse: Gabriela Rosés Bentancor (m. 2014; div. 2020)

Carl Erik Rinsch (born 1976 or 1977) is an American film and commercial director. He made his feature directorial debut with the 2013 film 47 Ronin.

In 2018, Netflix hired Rinsch to produce a 12-episode series called Conquest and spent $55 million on the project, but it fell apart after production milestones were missed and no episodes were completed. In 2025, he was arrested and charged in a seven-count federal indictment: prosecutors accused Rinsch of defrauding Netflix of $11 million, and spending the money on personal expenses. He was subsequently convicted on all charges, including money laundering and wire fraud. He was sentenced to 30 months in federal prison for his crimes.

== Early life and education ==
Rinsch was born and raised in Los Angeles, California and attended The Harvard-Westlake School. At 14, with his friend Tim Crane, Rinsch took a short film class at the University of Southern California Film School, after which he borrowed $1000 from his parents so that he and Crane could make the film The Quizz. The film became an entry at film festivals, including the New York Film Festival and the Telluride Film Festival. To earn enough money to make another film, the two went to work for Crane's father, cleaning sewers and marketing a plumbing inspection camera. Rinsch then studied literature and art at Brown University before transferring to Columbia University; while there, he worked as a part-time photojournalist at Rolling Stone. His thesis was three test films—ads for Pepsi, Calvin Klein and Tampax. In 2001, he entered these into the D&AD/Campaign Screen Competition and won the award for Best New Director.

== Career ==
Rinsch returned to Los Angeles and went to work at RSA, the commercial division of Ridley Scott Associates. Under Scott's guidance, he became an early adopter of creative technology and, with an ad for Lexus, became the first director to shoot a digital commercial. In 2009, Philips commissioned a series of five short films from RSA directors. The Rinsch film, a futuristic action thriller called The Gift, won the Gold Film Craft Lion at the 2010 Cannes Lions International Advertising Festival. This led to him being the planned director for a prequel to Alien, to be produced by Scott, and a remake of Logan's Run, although both projects would move on to other hands.

Rinsch made his feature film directing debut in 2013 with 47 Ronin, a fantasy adaptation of the Japanese historical epic of the Forty-seven Ronin. It starred Keanu Reeves, Hiroyuki Sanada and Rinko Kikuchi. The film had a production budget of $175 million and was received poorly both critically and commercially. Following 47 Ronin, Rinsch returned to directing commercials. Between 2015 and 2017, his commercials won numerous awards, including two Clio Awards, two Cresta Awards, six Eurobest Awards and four New York Festivals AME Awards.

== Abandoned Netflix series and legal disputes ==
Rinsch and his wife, Gabriela Rosés, planned a passion project for their next work: a science-fiction series about an artificial human-like species called "Organic Intelligent" which are created to provide humanitarian aid around the world and face conspiracies that create conflict and an apocalyptic showdown. Production company 30West invested in the project, which was called White Horse, and Rinsch and Rosés began creating episodes; when they ran out of funding, Keanu Reeves stepped in as a co-producer and provided funding. Rinsch and Rosés used six short episodes, each 4-10 minutes in length, to pitch a full season. During the streaming boom of 2015–2019, there was an intense race for content, and both Amazon Prime Video and Netflix expressed interest in picking up the project. Netflix landed it, agreeing to provide $61.2 million in several installments to produce the series, which was renamed Conquest.

According to a 2023 The New York Times investigation by John Carreyrou, the production of Conquest was troubled and Rinsch's behavior became erratic. A film union in Brazil complained about Rinsch's behavior on set, specifically his yelling and cursing at members of the crew. He also began taking lisdexamfetamine, a prescription amphetamine. In 2019, Rosés hired a behavioral health consultant to try to persuade Rinsch to enter rehab.

The situation on set worsened and an "intervention" was held by Rosés, Rinsch's brother, his wife, and members of the crew of Conquest, urging him to go into rehab. As the project was running low on cash, Rinsch urged Netflix to send him more money, despite not meeting production deadlines for the first phase of the project. Netflix forwarded his production company another $11 million, which Rinsch transferred to his personal brokerage account and used to purchase stock options, losing around $6 million in weeks.

Rinsch sent emails to Netflix executives involved in the project stating that he had a way to map "the coronavirus signal emanating from within the earth". Rosés filed for divorce; in 2021, according to her lawyers, Rinsch told her that airplanes were "organic, intelligent forces", and he sent texts to her saying he had the power to predict lightning strikes and volcanic eruptions. In March 2021, Netflix cut off funding for Conquest, with no finished episodes submitted. Rinsch has insisted in the subject line of an email to Netflix executives that he is "of sound mind and body", and stated in a 2023 Instagram post that he had refused to respond to questions for The New York Times article because he predicted that the article would "discuss the fact that I somehow lost my mind ... (Spoiler alert) ... I did not."

Despite the setbacks on Conquest and his stock market losses, Rinsch recovered somewhat financially. He used the money remaining from the funds that Netflix had sent his production company to invest millions in the cryptocurrency dogecoin in 2020, which he cashed out in May 2021, making $23 million. He then purchased five Rolls-Royces, a Ferrari, and large amounts of expensive furniture. Meanwhile, in an arbitration case he brought against Netflix, he argued that the money was contractually his and that Netflix owed him more than $14 million. In May 2024, the arbitrator ruled that Rinsch owed Netflix $8.78 million and the rights to any existing show footage.

=== Arrest and indictment ===
On March 18, 2025, Rinsch was arrested in Los Angeles and indicted in the United States District Court for the Southern District of New York in relation to the Netflix project. He was charged with one count each of wire fraud and money laundering, each of which carries a maximum penalty of 20 years in prison, and five counts of "engaging in monetary transactions in property derived from specified unlawful activity" in violation of the Money Laundering Control Act, each of which carries a maximum penalty of 10 years in prison. According to an unsealed 12-page FBI indictment, Rinsch is accused of misusing $11 million which was given to him by Netflix and which he claimed he would use to make a TV series called White Horse. Instead, this money was spent on "extremely risky investments", credit card bills, lawyers that Rinsch used to sue Netflix and handle his divorce, and lavish purchases such as luxury cars, including five Rolls-Royces and a Ferrari, as well as antique furniture, mattresses, bedding, watches, clothing, and stays at Four Seasons hotels and other rental properties.

On December 11, 2025, Rinsch was convicted of all charges. His sentencing, originally set for April 2026, was delayed. On 29 June 2026, he was sentenced to 30 months in federal prison.

== Personal life ==
In 2014, Rinsch married Gabriela Rosés Bentancor, a Uruguayan model and fashion designer. Rosés filed for divorce in July 2020.

== Filmography ==
- 47 Ronin (2013)
