= Mark Tonderai =

British entrepreneur, director, writer, actor and former disc jockey

- Born: 1974 (age 50–51); London, England
- Other names: Mark Tonderai-Hodges
- Occupations: Writer; radio producer; actor; film director; sound editor; businessman
- Known for: BBC Radio 1 disc jockey, 1990s
- Spouse: Zoe Stewart

Mark Tonderai (born 1974) is a British-Zimbabwean entrepreneur, film director, writer, actor and former disc jockey. He is co-founder of the London-based production company Shona Productions with his wife Zoe Stewart. He directed the crime drama television series The Five which first aired in April 2016 on the Sky 1 channel.

== Career ==
=== Radio ===
Tonderai began his career in the media working as a writer, producer and presenter for radio.

From early 1993 until late 1998 Tonderai was heavily involved in radio, and was the writer and producer of The Mark Tonderai Show, hosted on BBC Radio 1, and the Jam. Tonderai was also involved in numerous BBC Radio 4 projects, such as the Worldly Wise, Rainbow Nation and Week Ending, as well as Kiss 100's Rude Awakening, hosted on Kiss 100 London.

=== Television ===
He worked as writer, editor and director on Friday Night's All Wright, made by ITV, and worked on Channel 4's Home and Away, as well as Sky One's Prickly Heat.

=== Acting ===
In the early 2000s, he appeared in such productions as Kevin & Perry Go Large and Holby City.

=== Film ===
His debut film as screenwriter-director, called Hush, was released in 2009. A psychological thriller, starring William Ash and Christine Bottomley Hush is a British horror/thriller film about a young couple on a motorway journey who are drawn into a game of cat and mouse with a truck driver following a near accident.

Tonderai and producer Mark Herbert from Warp X are in talks to co-produce Tonderai's next script, another thriller called I Die at Midnight. Film industry magazine Screen International has reported that Tonderai has his next five films already planned, including a Western called Stance.

In the summer of 2010, he directed the psychological thriller House at the End of the Street, based on a short story from Jonathan Mostow. The A Bigger Boat film is written by David Loucka. Filming of House at the End of the Street took place in Ottawa, Ontario, Canada, and it was released in September 2012.

== Filmography ==
=== Film ===
- Kevin & Perry Go Large (2000), actor
- Dog Eat Dog (2001), writer/actor
- Hush (2008), director/writer/executive director
- House at the End of the Street (2012), director
- Day of the Dead: Bloodline (2018), writer
- Spell (2020), director

=== Television ===
- The Five (2015), director
- 12 Monkeys (2015), director
- Paranoid (2016), director
- Time After Time (2017), director
- Lucifer (2017), director
- Gotham (2017-2019), director
- Black Lightning (2018), director
- Doctor Who (2018, 2023), director
- Impulse (2018-2019), director
- Tell Me a Story (2018), director
- Nightflyers (2018), director
- Daybreak (2019), director
- Castle Rock (2019), director
- Locke & Key (2020–2021), director
- Big Sky (2021), director
- The Mysterious Benedict Society (2021), director
- Foundation (2023), director
- Fire Country (2024), director
- Will Trent (2025), director
