= Joseph Crone =

Joseph or Joe Crone may refer to:

- Joseph Crone, buried at Mount Hope Cemetery, Rochester
- Joseph Crone, character in 11-11-11
- Edward Crone, known as Joe, inspiration for Billy Pilgrim
