= Max Topplin =

Canadian actor

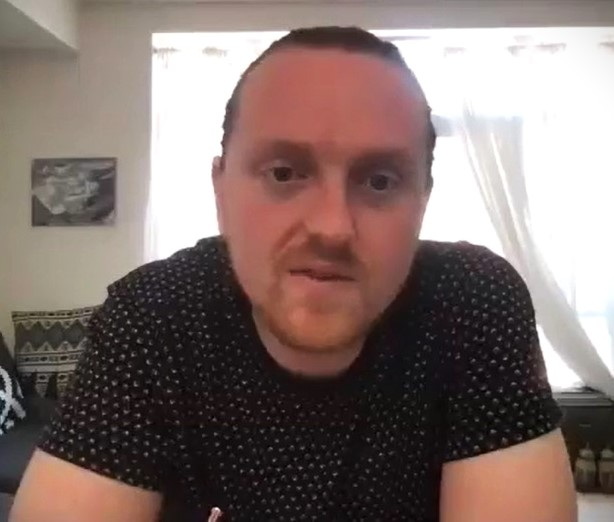
- Topplin in 2021
- Born: December 14, 1989 (age 36); Toronto, Ontario, Canada
- Occupation: Actor
- Years active: 2006-present

Max Topplin (born December 14, 1989) is a Canadian theatre, television and film actor. He was born in Toronto, Ontario. He made his debut on the television series Ghost Trackers. He is best known for his role in the USA Network legal drama Suits, where he played Harold Gunderson.

== Activism ==
Topplin is a director of LifePaths, a project focused on creating telemedicine systems to help in Haiti.

== Filmography ==
=== Film ===
Year	Title	Role	Notes
2008	The Incredible Hulk	Jimmy	
2012	The Barrens AKA Devil in the Woods	Zach	
2012	Dead Before Dawn 3D	Hillbilly Dave	
2013	Carrie	Jackie	
2015	Almost Anything	Jay	
2020	The Toll	Spencer	
2022	Fixation	Guard Spencer	Also a Producer

=== Television ===
Year	Title	Role	Notes
2006	Ghost Trackers	Max	
2008	Camp Rock	Boy #1	TV movie
2008	Fringe	Angry Teen	Pilot episode
2008	House Party	Birdy	
2008	Degrassi: The Next Generation	Dyson	Episodes: S8E08 "Lost in Love: Part 1" & S8E15 "Touch of Grey"
2010	How to Be Indie	Madison	Episode: S1E21 "How to Not Get Crushed by Your Crush"
2010	Haven	Matt West	Episode: S1E10 "The Hand You're Dealt"
2010	Todd and the Book of Pure Evil	Len Bergman	Episode: S1E12 "Checkmate"
2011	MetaJets	Doug Fontaine (voice)	Animated TV series
2011–15, 2019	Suits	Harold Gunderson	Recurring role
2012	Sunshine Sketches of a Little Town	Young Man Bob	TV movie
2016	The Crossroads of History	Hall Monitor	Episode: "Hitler"
2016	Shoot the Messenger	Harry Beauchamp III	Episodes: S1E4 "Careful What You Pray For", S1E5 "Strange Bedfellows"
2018	Insomnia	Martin	
