= Darren Lynn Bousman =

American film director and screenwriter (born 1979)

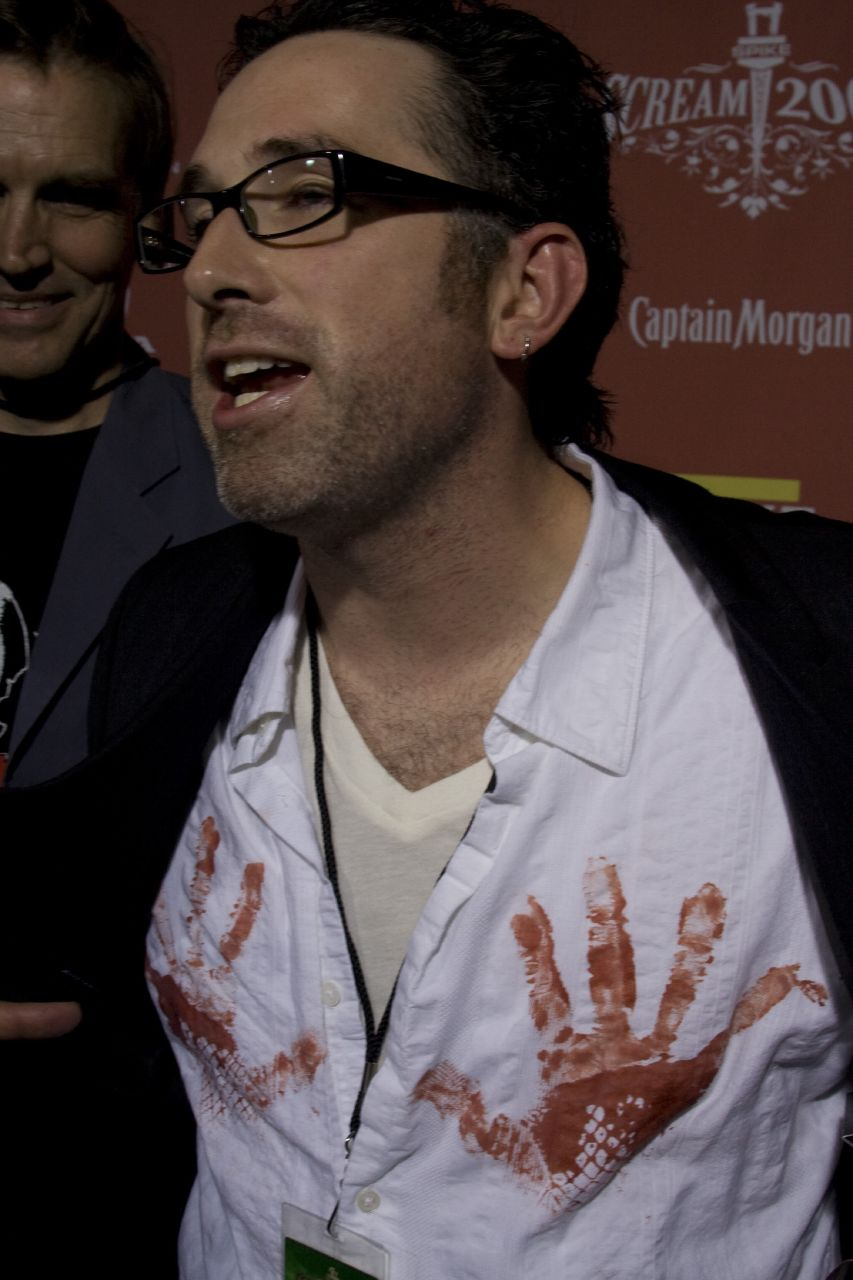
- Bousman at the Scream Awards, in 2007
- Born: January 11, 1979 (age 47); Overland Park, Kansas, U.S.
- Education: Full Sail University
- Occupations: Film director; screenwriter; producer; editor
- Years active: 2000–present
- Spouse: Laura Bousman (m. 2010)
- Children: 2
- Website: darrenlynnbousman.com

Darren Lynn Bousman (/ˈbaʊzmən/; born January 11, 1979) is an American film director and screenwriter, best known for his work in horror films. He has directed four of the Saw films: Saw II, Saw III, Saw IV, and Spiral. He also directed the horror musical films Repo! The Genetic Opera and The Devil's Carnival. Bousman is co-creator and writer of alternate reality games (ARG) and immersive experiences, The Tension Experience (2016), The Lust Experience (2017), Theatre Macabre (2018), iConfidant (2020), and One Day Die (2020). As of July 2025, Bousman is the co-host of the filmmaking podcast Darren and Josh Make a Movie alongside Josh Stolberg.

== Early life ==
Bousman was born in Overland Park, Kansas, the son of Nancy and Lynn Bousman. He attended high school at Shawnee Mission North High School in Overland Park, and studied film at Full Sail University in Winter Park, Florida, graduating in 2000.

== Career ==
=== Saw II ===
During 2004, he was pitching an idea for a movie called The Desperate to various American studios, who complained that the screenplay was too violent, and the plot was too close to Saw. David A. Armstrong who worked on Saw asked Bousman if he could show the script to Saw producer Gregg Hoffman. Hoffman read the script and called Bousman interested in producing The Desperate, but after showing the script to his partners Mark Burg and Oren Koules, the two decided it would be the perfect opportunity to turn The Desperate into Saw II. Two months later, Bousman was flown to Toronto to direct.

During the production of Saw II, Bousman directed the music video for Mudvayne's single "Forget to Remember," which appeared as the lead song on the soundtrack album. Saw II was profitable and Bousman was signed on to direct Saw III, which was released on October 27, 2006.

=== Saw III and Saw IV ===
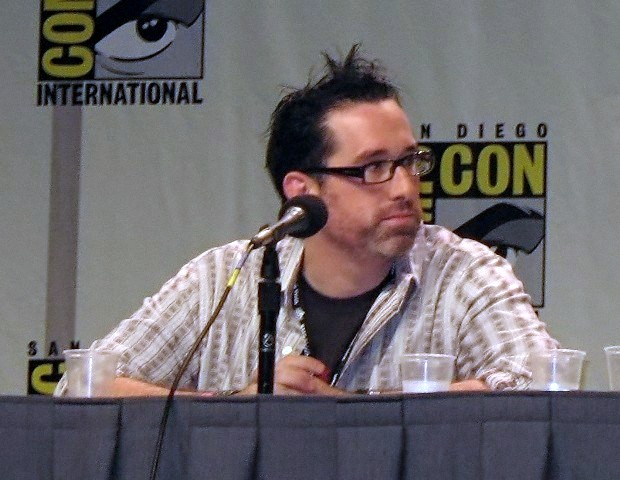
Bousman at the 2007 San Diego Comic Con

After Saw III, Bousman announced that he would not direct another Saw film so that he would be free to prepare for his project Repo! the Genetic Opera, the stage version of which he had directed in 2002. Despite this, on February 19, 2007, Leigh Whannell announced that Bousman had signed on to direct Saw IV. Bousman explained that before shooting could begin on Repo! The Genetic Opera, there was a gap of time during which the songs were being pre-recorded, and he would be able to direct Saw IV during that period.

=== Spiral ===
In 2019, it was announced Bousman would return to the Saw franchise directing Spiral: From the Book of Saw, the ninth installment in the series. The film was set to be released on May 15, 2020, but was delayed due to the COVID-19 pandemic. The release of the film was moved to May 21, 2021.

=== Filmography ===
In 2008, Bousman directed an episode of the horror anthology show Fear Itself, entitled "New Year's Day". He has also been attached to direct the remake of David Cronenberg's Scanners. Bousman taught Film director newcomers in the Horror Film Boot Camp, which ran from May 7–9, 2010, in Albuquerque, New Mexico. He will direct the psychological thriller Ninety, written by Scott Milam.

Bousman directed the 2010 remake of Mother's Day starring Shawn Ashmore, Deborah Ann Woll, and Briana Evigan. In 2011, Bousman directed the film 11-11-11. In 2012, Bousman directed and produced The Devil's Carnival, a short film planned to be the first installment of a longer series. Bousman also wrote and directed The Barrens, starring Stephen Moyer and Mia Kirshner, in 2012.

On May 13, 2013, it was announced that Bousman would be directing a film titled Sacrilege, another religious-themed work. In 2015, he participated in the anthology movie Tales of Halloween produced by Epic Pictures. He directed the segment "The Night Billy Raised Hell" written by Clint Sears.

In 2016, he directed Abattoir, which was described as "the best 2016 horror movie you didn't see" and Bousman as "an underrated force of bold originality" by Bloody Disgusting but otherwise was not well reviewed. Abattoir premiered at the Los Angeles Film Festival on June 7, 2016.

Bousman, again, collaborated with writer, Clint Sears, in 2018 on St. Agatha, a religious horror film set in a convent in the 1950s in small-town Georgia. He next directed Death of Me, another horror film, starring Maggie Q and Luke Hemsworth. It was filmed in Thailand and released on October 2, 2020, by Saban Films.

=== Immersive theater ===
Bousman began developing immersive experiences in 2016 and has co-created five experiences to date:

=== The Tension Experience (2016) ===
The Tension Experience, created with Gordon Bijelonic and Clint Sears and directed by Bousman, launched on September 8, 2016. The ARG immersive theater production took place over nine months, with participants unlocking secrets through various interactions in an alternate reality game which culminating in a series of two-hour live immersive experiences at a secret location in Los Angeles. The Tension Experience was set in a 45,000-square-foot warehouse and employed over 40 actors who followed different scripts depending on how participants reacted.

The Verge described The Tension Experience as "A dramatically engaging, layered story experience that breathed new life into the ideas of transmedia storytelling" saying it raised the bar for the kind of emotional experiences that people can expect from immersive theater. In 2018, independent film and television production company, AGBO, announced it would partner with The Tension Experience to develop new immersive experiences and support expansion of the production to more cities. The first planned project was to be a permanent casino destination in Las Vegas.

=== The Lust Experience (2017) ===
The Lust Experience debuted in 2017, immediately following the success of The Tension Experience. A Bloody Disgusting review said The Lust Experience was a story surrounding an ancient cult that was actively recruiting new members and that "Bousman and Sears pulled every string they could to push us to our mental limits" Haunting described The Tension Experience and The Lust Experience as "two interconnected multi-year alternate reality experiences that preyed on the emotions and thrived on the dedication of a loyal and widespread group of followers."

=== Theatre Macabre (2018) ===
Theatre Macabre was launched in Los Angeles in 2018. The eagerly anticipated immersive experience had a thousand-page script and was inspired by the Paris Théâtre du Grand Guignol, which, in 1897, "specialized in grotesque shows that explored society's darkest taboos". Bousman told Daily Dead, "it is the most intricately designed and choreographed show that we've done, where there are endless possibilities when you walk through the door. Anything can happen based on your choices as a participant."

=== iConfidant (2020) ===
A socially distant immersive ARG, iConfidant ran for six weeks in 2020, culminating in a "multimedia, multi-platform experience centered around the theme of connection" on June 6, 2020. Participants joined a month-long journey, exploring friendship, deceit, and mental health, entering what Bousman described as a "rabbit hole [allowing participants to enter] a bizarre and distorted world". No Proscenium said, "the amount of work behind iConfidant is stunning" and noted that the show raised over $4,000 for Movement for Black Lives.

=== One Day Die (2020) ===
One Day Die was a 90-minute guided online séance experience that took place throughout October 2020. /Film described it as an "intense, R-rated experience". The immersive show saw participants each receive a mysterious handmade box, sent by the show's creators, that must remain sealed until the experience commenced. Participants then enjoyed "a spooky evening from the comfort of their own homes". A run of sold-out shows in October saw Bousman announce two additional encore shows in early November. Daily Dead said, "Darren Lynn Bousman is one of the most inventive creators in the immersive entertainment space today and the fact that many of his events run for a limited time, means you have to catch them before they're gone forever."

== Personal life ==
He was inducted into the Full Sail University Hall of Fame in 2011.

On October 4, 2008, Bousman got engaged to Laura Bosserman and married her on January 2, 2010. The couple has two children, Henry Lynn Bousman and Hadley Jordan Bousman.

== Filmography ==
=== Short film ===
Director

Year	Title	Notes
2000	Butterfly Dreams	Also writer
2006	Repo! The Genetic Opera	
2015	The Night Billy Raised Hell	Segment of Tales of Halloween

Producer

- SockMonster (2017)
- Good Girl (2018)

=== Feature film ===
Year	Title	Director	Writer	Producer
2001	Identity Lost	Yes	Yes	No
2005	Saw II	Yes	Yes	No
2006	Saw III	Yes	No	No
2007	Saw IV	Yes	No	No
2008	Repo! The Genetic Opera	Yes	No	Executive
2010	Mother's Day	Yes	No	No
2011	11-11-11	Yes	Yes	No
2012	The Devil's Carnival	Yes	No	Yes
2012	The Barrens	Yes	Yes	Yes
2016	Alleluia! The Devil's Carnival	Yes	No	No
2016	Abattoir	Yes	No	No
2018	St. Agatha	Yes	No	No
2020	Death of Me	Yes	No	No
2021	Spiral: From the Book of Saw	Yes	No	No
2023	The Cello	Yes	No	No
2026	Twisted	Yes	No	No

=== Television ===
Director

Year	Title	Notes
2008	Fear Itself	Episode "New Year's Day"
2014	Angelus	TV movie (Also writer)

Executiv producer

- Crow's Blood (2018)

As himself

Year	Title	Notes
2010	Scream Queens	As director of "Director's Challenge" (Episode 8)

=== Music video ===
Year	Title	Performer	Director	Writer
2004	"So"	Static-X	Yes	No
2005	"Forget to Remember"	Mudvayne	Yes	No
2013	"Fight Like a Girl"	Emilie Autumn	Yes	Yes
2017	"Alone Land"	RGK & Sabrina Kern	Yes	No

=== Immersive theater ===
Year	Title	Creators
2016	The Tension Experience	Darren Lynn Bousman, Clint Sears, Gordon Bijelonic
2017	The Lust Experience	Darren Lynn Bousman, Clint Sears, Gordon Bijelonic
2018	Theatre Macabre	Darren Lynn Bousman, Clint Sears, Gordon Bijelonic
2020	iConfidant	Darren Lynn Bousman, Joshua Dietz, Morgan Rooms, Amanda DeSouza, Stephanie Hyden, Lawrence Meyers, Jace Anderson, Adam Gierasch, Santiago Vega-Albela Osorio, Max Friedlich
2020	One Day Die	Darren Lynn Bousman, Daniel Garcia, Blake Vogt, Joshua Dietz

== Recurring cast members ==
Work Actor
Work Actor	Saw II	Saw III	Saw IV	New Year's Day	Repo! The Genetic Opera	Mother's Day	11-11-11	The Barrens	The Devil's Carnival	Abattoir
Tobin Bell	check	check	check							
Shawnee Smith	check	check	check							
Costas Mandylor		check	check							
Donnie Wahlberg	check	check	check							
Lyriq Bent	check	check	check			check				
Betsy Russell		check	check							
Erik Knudsen	check							check		
J. Larose		check	check	check	check	check	check	check	check	check
Athena Karkanis			check		check			check		
Marty Adams			check		check			check		
Terrance Zdunich					check				check	
Alexa Vega					check	check			check	
Paul Sorvino					check				check	
Nivek Ogre					check				check	
Bill Moseley					check				check	
Briana Evigan				check		check			check	
Shawn Ashmore						check		check		
Emilie Autumn							check		check	
Dayton Callie									check	check
Jessica Lowndes									check	check
