= A Midsummer's Nightmare (film) =

2017 American thriller film

- Title card
- Genre: Psychological thriller
- Based on: A Midsummer Night's Dream by William Shakespeare
- Written by: Anthony Jaswinski
- Directed by: Gary Fleder
- Starring: Eric Balfour; Thomas Cadrot; Casey Deidrick; Ellie Gall; Chelsea Gilligan; Paul Walter Hauser; Daisy Head; Anjali Jay; Jake Robinson; Dominic Monaghan; Rhys Ward; Courtney Love
- Music by: James S. Levine; Jim Dooley
- Country of origin: United States
- Original language: English

Production
- Executive producers: Gary Fleder; Jeff Kwatinetz; Josh Barry
- Producer: Jim O'Grady
- Cinematography: Trevor Forrest
- Editors: Keith Henderson; Scott Turner
- Running time: 42 minutes
- Production company: A+E Studios

Original release
- Network: Lifetime
- Release: July 31, 2017

A Midsummer's Nightmare is a 2017 American psychological thriller television film directed by Gary Fleder and written by Anthony Jaswinski. It is a modern adaptation of the play A Midsummer Night's Dream by William Shakespeare. It aired on Lifetime on July 31, 2017.

== Synopsis ==
Four young lovers go into the woods to pursue their romantic desires but find their fantasies and secrets being used against them.

== Cast ==
- Paul Walter Hauser as Nick Bottoms
- Eric Balfour as Mark
- Dominic Monaghan as Mike Puck
- Thomas Cadrot as Agent Wills
- Casey Deidrick as Liam
- Courtney Love as Titania
- Daisy Head as Elena
- Anjali Jay as Agent Radlas
- Chelsea Gilligan as Josselin
- Chad Rook as Blane Thomas
- Ellie Gall as Hannah Becker
- Rhys Ward as Royce
- Jake Robinson as Daniel Brooks
- Kylee Bush as Actress
- Jason William Day as Big Brother
- Lucius Fairburn as Little Brother

== Production ==
The film was produced as a pilot for a planned hour-long anthology series but the pilot was not picked up as a series. Filming took place in Vancouver and elsewhere in British Columbia, Canada from October 31 to November 18, 2016. Liz Gateley, Executive Vice President and Head of Programming for Lifetime, stated that the intent was to develop "content that redefines what it means to be a Lifetime show." The production received some media attention for booking Courtney Love in a role.

== Broadcast ==
The pilot was originally scheduled to premiere on July 28, 2017, but was then moved to July 14 and then again to July 31, when it ultimately aired.

== Reception ==
Reviewer Duane of the website Shakespeare Geek gave the film a negative review, doubting the existence of "any Shakespeare of note" in it.
