= I Come Home =

2026 Canadian drama film

- Directed by: Glen Wood
- Written by: Andreas Vatiliotou
- Produced by: Glen Wood; Jordan Hayes
- Starring: Hannah Cheesman; Carlos Gonzalez-Vio; Ryan Ali
- Cinematography: Jordan Kennington
- Edited by: Harrison Perez
- Production companies: Little Mama Media; Viddywell Films
- Distributed by: Blue Fox Entertainment
- Release date: May 26, 2026 (Inside Out)
- Running time: 97 minutes
- Country: Canada
- Languages: English; French

I Come Home is a Canadian drama film, directed by Glen Wood and released in 2026. The film stars Hannah Cheesman, Carlos Gonzalez-Vio and Ryan Ali as Christine, Alexander and Stéphane, a polyamorous bisexual throuple from Toronto whose relationship is tested when Christine discovers that she's pregnant, shortly before the three travel to Huntsville to attend the wedding of Christine's sister Kat (Jordan Hayes), where they face the harsh disapproval of Christine's family.

The cast also includes Paulino Nunes and Sonja Smits as Christine's parents, and Will Bowes as Kat's fiancé.

== Production ==
According to Wood and screenwriter Andreas Vatiliotou, the film had its genesis when Vatiliotou, while out for dinner with a group of friends, noticed that everybody in the group, regardless of whether they were straight, gay, single or coupled, had the same disapproving reaction to a couple in their social circle having brought a third partner into their marriage.

Wood stated that he was drawn to direct the film because it wasn't a conventional love triangle story in which the relationship itself was a source of competition and conflict, but instead offered polyamory as a positive "thing to root for" in the face of external challenges.

== Distribution ==
The film premiered at the 2026 Inside Out Film and Video Festival. It has been acquired for distribution by Blue Fox Entertainment, with commercial release slated for fall 2026.

== Critical response ==
Jericho Tadeo of Exclaim! wrote that "I Come Home puts polyamory into focus in a way that feels fresh and even insightful — at least at first. A meticulous setup of relationship dynamics, stakes, desires and roles captures the attention before it takes a detour into familiar domestic drama territory. This isn't to say an adherence to narrative conventions can't yield interesting cinema, but when a film that begins by eschewing tropes it later falls prey to, it becomes extra disappointing."

== Awards ==
The film won the Audience Award for feature films at Inside Out.
