= Rhys Ward =

Canadian actor (born 1989)

- Born: September 6, 1989 (age 36); Hamilton, Ontario, Canada
- Occupation: Actor
- Years active: 2011-present

Rhys Ward (born September 6, 1989) is a Canadian male actor. He is best known for his roles as Adam Darrow in The Returned, and Jason Martin in And Now a Word From Our Sponsor. He also played Atom in The 100.

== Career ==
Rhys Ward and Ally Sheedy recently starred in the independent feature film titled, Criminal Seduction days after wrapping up a role as Atom in The CW series The 100. He had a recurring role on CW's iZombie as Cameron and also starred as Adam Darrow in the show The Returned. He has made a few movies with Lifetime.

== Filmography ==
Film
Year	Film	Role	Notes
2011	The Good Witch's Family	Wes Maneri	
2013	And Now a Word From Our Sponsor	Jason Martin	
2014	Not With My Daughter (AKA Client Seduction)	Greg Milles	TV film
2016	The Happys	Sebastian	
2016	Wrong Swipe	Matt	TV film
2017	A Midsummer's Nightmare	Royce	TV film
2017	Good After Bad	Shaine	
Television
Year	Title	Role	Notes
2011	My Babysitter's a Vampire	Cute Boy	Episode: "The Brewed"
2012	Nikita	Sammy	Episode: "Rogue"
2012	The L.A. Complex	Zach	3 Episodes
2012–2013	Heartland	Jeremy Hughes	6 episodes
2012	State Of Syn	Gabriel	4 episodes
2013	Eli: Dorm Life (Degrassi Web series)	J.J.	2 episodes
2014	The 100	Atom	2 episodes
2015	The Returned	Adam	Recurring role
2015	iZombie	Cameron Henley	2 episodes S01E12&13 (Blaine's World & Dead Rat, Live Rat, Brown Rat, White Rat )
2016	The Magicians	Bayler	
