= The Dream Team (1989 film) =

1989 film by Howard Zieff

- Theatrical release poster
- Directed by: Howard Zieff
- Written by: Jon Connolly; David Loucka
- Produced by: Christopher W. Knight
- Starring: Michael Keaton; Christopher Lloyd; Peter Boyle; Stephen Furst; Lorraine Bracco
- Cinematography: Adam Holender
- Edited by: Carroll Timothy O'Meara
- Music by: David McHugh
- Production company: Imagine Entertainment
- Distributed by: Universal Pictures
- Release date: April 7, 1989
- Running time: 113 minutes
- Country: United States
- Language: English
- Budget: $14 million
- Box office: $28,890,240 (USA)

The Dream Team is a 1989 American comedy drama film directed by Howard Zieff and produced by Christopher W. Knight for Imagine Entertainment and Universal Pictures. It stars Michael Keaton, Christopher Lloyd, Peter Boyle and Stephen Furst as mental-hospital inpatients who are left unsupervised in New York City during a field trip gone awry. Jon Connolly and David Loucka wrote the screenplay.

== Plot ==
Dr. Jeff Weitzman is a psychiatrist working in a sanitarium in New Jersey. His primary patients are Billy, Henry, Jack and Albert. Billy has the most mental capacity of the group and is their de facto leader, though he is a pathological liar with violent tendencies. Henry has OCD and has deluded himself into thinking he is one of the doctors at the hospital, often walking around with a clipboard, lab coat and stethoscope. Jack is a former advertising executive who believes he is Jesus Christ. Finally, Albert is a man-child who can only communicate using baseball terminology, particularly from former ball player and commentator Phil Rizzuto.

Convinced that his patients need a change of scenery, Dr. Weitzman persuades the administration to allow him to take them to a baseball game at Yankee Stadium. Unfortunately, he accidentally encounters two corrupt cops just as they murder another officer. The doctor then gets knocked unconscious trying to get away and is put in the hospital. The group is now stranded in New York City, forced to cope with a place which is often more bizarre than their sanitarium.

After Dr. Weitzman's beating and coma, it is up to the patients to save their doctor from being murdered by the cops. They end up having to both use and overcome their delusions and disorders in order to save the only man who ever tried to help them, with both the police and the killers looking for them. Three revisit scenes from their pasts: Billy (former girlfriend Riley), Henry (his wife and daughter), and Jack (his former employer). As each patient does so individually, they each behave in a competent, rational manner, Henry genuinely missing his family, Billy wishing to pursue a more serious relationship, and Jack appealing to his boss that he and his friends are in trouble (but the boss reports Jack to the police).

Ultimately, the patients succeed in turning in the criminals. Their doctor makes a recovery and the patients again attempt a trip to the ballpark, this time with no supervision.

== Cast ==
- Michael Keaton as Billy Caufield
- Christopher Lloyd as Henry Sikorsky
- Peter Boyle as Jack McDermott
- Stephen Furst as Albert Ianuzzi
- Dennis Boutsikaris as Dr. Jeff Weitzman
- Lorraine Bracco as Riley
- Milo O'Shea as Dr. Newald
- Philip Bosco as O'Malley
- James Remar as Gianelli
- Michael Lembeck as Ed, Riley's ex-boyfriend
- Jack Duffy as Bernie
- Jack Gilpin as Dr. Talmer
- Larry Pine as Canning
- Ted Simonett as a yuppie
- John Stocker as Murray
- Lizbeth MacKay as Henry's wife
- Ron James as Dwight
- Wayne Tippit as Captain Lewitt
- Freda Foh Shen as a TV newscaster
- Dennis Parlato as TV newscaster
- Donna Hanover as a field reporter
- Jihmi Kennedy as the tow truck driver

== Reception ==
The movie had a mixed reception, with Vincent Canby stating that "there's nothing dreadfully wrong with The Dream Team, Howard Zieff's new comedy, except that it's not funny too much of the time. On those occasions when it is funny, the humor less often prompts laughter than mute appreciation of the talents of the principal performers - Michael Keaton, Christopher Lloyd and Peter Boyle." Michael Wilmington noted that "[the film] is so clearly derived from the movie "One Flew Over the Cuckoo's Nest" that you might begin to wonder when Jack Nicholson will show up. [...which] may suggest that "Dream Team" is a weak, derivative, somehow disreputable movie, which is somewhat true. If you compare it to its obvious source, it has a coy, flip attitude toward illness, skating over the surface of tragedy, dementia and pain without breaking the ice. The union of four oddballs—rebel-writer, obsessive noodge, religious fanatic and couch potato—is almost too schematic, as if the writers were somehow trying to define '80s dissidence. But even though you can predict virtually everything that happens from the first five minutes on, the director and actors manage to hook you in." It currently holds a 50% rating on Rotten Tomatoes from 16 reviews.

=== Box office ===
The Dream Team debuted at No. 2 at the American box office, where it made $5.7 million at 1,316 theaters, averaging US$4,335 per screen. It opened only one number shy of a competing Paramount film, Major League. It went down from that position in subsequent weeks.

== See also ==
Asadhyulu & Krazzy 4 - Unofficial Telugu & Hindi language remakes respectively with the same story.
