= Hush (2008 film) =

- Theatrical release poster
- Directed by: Mark Tonderai
- Written by: Mark Tonderai
- Produced by: Mark Herbert; Zoe Stewart; Colin Pons; Robin Gutch
- Starring: Will Ash; Christine Bottomley
- Cinematography: Philipp Blaubach
- Edited by: Victoria Boydell
- Music by: Theo Green
- Production companies: Warp X Film4; Pathé; Screen Yorkshire; UK Film Council; FearFactory
- Distributed by: Optimum Releasing
- Release dates: 15 August 2008 (Berlin Fantasy Filmfest); 13 March 2009 (United Kingdom)
- Running time: 91 minutes
- Country: United Kingdom
- Language: English
- Budget: £1 million
- Box office: $288,667 (worldwide)

Hush is a 2008 British horror film directed by Mark Tonderai in his directorial debut. It stars William Ash and Christine Bottomley. It is about a young couple on a motorway journey who are drawn into pursuit of a truck that appears to be involved in kidnapping women.

The film was produced by Warp X and Shona Productions. UK Film Council and Film4 supplied the funding for the film. The film was distributed by Optimum Releasing.

== Plot ==
Zakes and his girlfriend Beth are travelling along the M1 motorway at night, bickering over their strained relationship. While Beth is asleep, a truck overtakes Zakes and its tailgate momentarily slides up, revealing a naked woman, bound and bloodied in a cage, screaming for help. He calls the police but cannot provide a number plate as it is covered in dirt.

Zakes follows the truck and manages to slide his hand under the tailgate to take a photograph using Beth's mobile phone. It appears to be nothing more than a white blur from the flash but Zakes later suspects it could be a hand. Zakes eventually loses the truck, making Beth furious, claiming he never takes responsibility for anything.

They stop at a service station; Beth ends their relationship and says she will find her own way home. Back at the car, Zakes sees the truck pull up, and watches a man in a hooded jacket go inside. Zakes follows to try and find Beth, but she is nowhere to be seen. He alerts two security men about her disappearance, but they do not believe him. Zakes later finds Beth's necklace in the car park. Believing she has been taken by the man in the truck, he decides to follow it, but upon returning to his car, finds his tyre has been punctured by rowdy football fans. Zakes steals a car from a woman getting fuel at the station.

Meanwhile, a security guard decides to look through the CCTV footage. He sees Beth entering the station by herself and leaving through the back door with a man in a hooded jacket. He is then killed by the other security guard, who is connected with the kidnappings. Zakes follows the truck to a site that is full of identical white trucks. A police officer arrives and arrests Zakes, believing he is trespassing. Zakes begs him to check all of the vehicles before they go. While doing this, the officer is killed by the hooded man.

Zakes escapes from the police car and flees back to his car. A distraught woman then appears claiming she has been kidnapped. He lets her in and drives to a nearby house to call for help. The elderly couple living there invite them in; the bloodied woman offers to call the police but cuts the phone line beforehand, revealing she too is part of the plan. She cuts the power in the house, kills the couple and attacks Zakes. He wakes up with his hands nailed to the floorboards. When he gets free, a fight ensues; Zakes overpowers the woman and kills her by stabbing her in the eye with one of the nails.

Zakes returns to the truck site and finds Beth chained up in a cage outside. She says the keys are with the man who is showering inside. Zakes goes inside and finds other women locked up and gagged; they are being used for human trafficking. Zakes retrieves the keys and returns to Beth to help her escape first, but they hear the man coming and Zakes is forced to flee. A cat-and-mouse game begins when he realises Zakes is hiding on the site somewhere. He calls the woman's phone, which Zakes has on him, and follows the ring to where he is. However, Zakes has left the phone on the seat in an empty truck and is hiding in the forklift nearby. When the man steps into the right spot, Zakes pushes a button and the crane releases a load onto the attacker, killing him.

One year later, at a service station, a man picks out a book titled Traffic, a non-fiction novel written by Zakes based on the events that he and Beth experienced. The driver is the security guard who earlier killed his partner. He purchases the book, goes out to his truck (one identical to the killers' truck) and drives off.

== Cast ==
- Will Ash as Zakes Abbot
- Christine Bottomley as Beth
- Andreas Wisniewski as The Tarman
- Claire Keelan as Wendy
- Stuart McQuarrie as Thorpe
- Robbie Gee as Chimponda
- Peter Wyatt as Mr. Coates
- Sheila Reid as Mrs. Coates
- Shaun Dingwall as Police Constable Mitchall

== Reception ==
Peter Bradshaw wrote in The Guardian that Hush was "a broad, trashy but entertaining horror thriller that makes the most of a limited budget and locations". Laurence Phelan wrote in The Independent that "Although this debut kidnap-thriller's small budget sometimes shows, it is effective nonetheless, and gets good mileage from the eerie unpleasantness of its setting: night-time in and around the service stations of the M1."
