= Allie MacDonald =

Canadian actress

Alexandra MacDonald
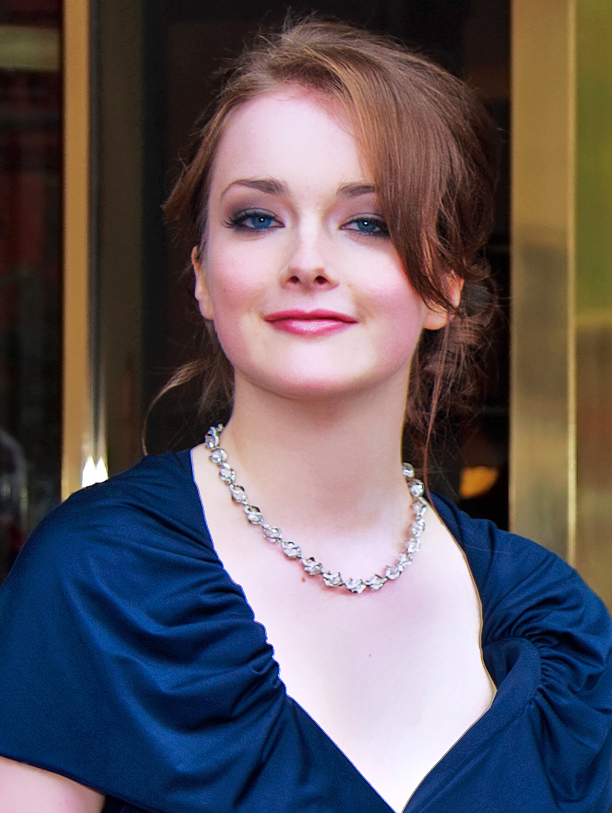
- MacDonald at the 2010 Toronto International Film Festival
- Born: Alexandra MacDonald; September 17, 1988 (age 38); Antigonish, Nova Scotia, Canada
- Occupation: Actress
- Years active: 1998–present

Alexandra "Allie" MacDonald (born September 17, 1988) is a Canadian actress.

== Early life ==
MacDonald was born in Antigonish, Nova Scotia, Canada, to parents Peter and Chrissy MacDonald. She studied musical theatre at the Canadian College of Performing Arts in Victoria, British Columbia.

== Career ==
She made her feature film debut as Eve in Score: A Hockey Musical (2010). She has appeared in independent films, short films and television shows. She starred in the films The Barrens (2012), House at the End of the Street (2012), And Now a Word from Our Sponsor (2013), the horror-musical film, Stage Fright (2014), and the neonoir film Under the Silver Lake (2018).

Her most notable television roles are Belinda McKay in the Canadian comedy Young Drunk Punk. and Trina on Orphan Black. She appeared as Edie Soames in the CTV mini-series Cardinal.

She released her debut EP 'Thank You' on December 20, 2016, under the pseudonym Sureilla.

== Filmography ==
=== Film ===
Year	Title	Role	Notes
1998	The Real Howard Spitz	Little Girl - Library	
2009	In the Grid	Maddy	Short
2009	Red & Stone	Heather	Short
2009	Green Christmas	Maddie	Short
2010	Score: A Hockey Musical	Eve	
2011	Blink		Short
2012	Stories We Tell	Joanna Polley	Documentary
2012	House at the End of the Street	Jillian	
2012	The Barrens	Sadie Vineyard	
2012	The Riverbank	Patti Konstantin	
2013	And Now a Word from Our Sponsor	Meghan Hillridge	
2014	Stage Fright	Camilla Swanson	
2015	La Ville de L'Amour	Sophia	Short
2018	Why Not Choose Love: A Mary Pickford Manifesto	Lillian Gish	Post-production
2018	Under the Silver Lake	Meek Bride	

=== Television ===
Year	Title	Role	Notes
2009	The Ron James Show		1 episode
2011	The Listener	Regan Dennis	Episode: "Vanished"
2011	King	Barbara Tamsin	Episode: "Farah Elliott"
2011	Salem Falls	Megan Saxton	TV film
2012	Alphas	Lisa	Episode: "Gods and Monsters"
2012	Haven	Tina	Episode: "Real Estate"
2013	Cinnamon Girl	Cassie Carter	TV film
2013	Lost Girl	Hannah	Episode: "Fae-ge Against the Machine"
2013	Longmire	Delila	Episode: "Carcasses"
2014	Remedy	Sheila McCabe	Episode: "Tomorrow the Green Grass"
2015	Trigger Point	Ashley Robinson	TV film
2015	Young Drunk Punk	Belinda McKay	Main role
2015	Killjoys	Clara	Episode: "Vessel"
2016	Orphan Black	Trina	Recurring role (4 episodes)
2016	Private Eyes	The Demonic Donatella	Episode: "Disappearing Act"
2016	Conviction	Sierra Macy	Episode: "Bad Deals"
2017	Cardinal	Edie Soames	Main role (season 1)
2018	Misfits	Kelly Bailey	Episode: "Pilot"
2018	Mean Queen	Amy Turner	TV film
2019	What/If	Maddie Carter	Recurring role
2021	Pacific Rim: The Black	Brina Travis	Voice role
