= The Barrens (film) =

- Home video release poster
- Directed by: Darren Lynn Bousman
- Screenplay by: Darren Lynn Bousman
- Produced by: Darren Lynn Bousman; Richard Saperstein; Brian Witten
- Starring: Stephen Moyer; Mia Kirshner; Allie MacDonald; Shawn Ashmore
- Cinematography: Joseph White
- Edited by: Erin Deck
- Music by: Bobby Johnston
- Production company: The Genre Company
- Distributed by: Anchor Bay Entertainment
- Release date: September 28, 2012
- Running time: 94 min
- Countries: United States; Canada
- Language: English

The Barrens is a 2012 American horror film written and directed by Darren Lynn Bousman and starring Stephen Moyer and Mia Kirshner.

The film was released under different titles in several European territories: e.g., as Jersey Devil in the German-speaking countries, as The Forest in Belgium and France, and as Devil in the Woods in the United Kingdom, when shown on The Horror Channel in January 2015.

== Plot ==
Two young French campers walk together through the woods, commenting that there are no animals or birds around. They discover a pile of mutilated deer carcasses left on the trail and then are chased by a mutilated deer that drops dead in front of them. Something sounding like a large swarm of birds is heard approaching.

Richard Vineyard, his second wife Cynthia, his 17-year-old daughter Sadie, and his young son Danny leave their suburban home for a camping trip in the Pine Barrens forest in southern New Jersey. On the way, they see a mutilated deer crossing and dying in the road. They stay in a crowded commercial campsite full of obnoxious teenage campers. While setting up his tent, Richard has a flashback to a traumatic event from his childhood that occurred in the Barrens. Later that evening, when a fellow camper tells a story of the Jersey Devil, several campers pull a scary prank on the Vineyards. Richard overreacts, much to the embarrassment of the rest of the family.

That night, Richard dreamed he is being chased through a field. He is awakened by Cynthia in the middle of the forest, having actually left their tent while asleep. He accuses his wife of infidelity; she does not understand his suspicion and tries to reassure him. Richard apologizes. As Cynthia returns to the tent, Richard goes for a walk and sees a deer carcass fall from a tree. It is later revealed that Cynthia is his second wife after the loss of Sadie's mother a decade prior. Also, Richard is taking pain medication for an arm wound received before they left home.

One of the campers involved in the prank the previous night is missing. Richard, who appears weakened by illness, leads his family deeper into the forest, away from the trails, to a new campsite. While resting, Danny finds the disemboweled corpse of the missing camper but says nothing. Richard begins hallucinating and becomes irritable. They find an abandoned campsite with a decomposed dog carcass and a destroyed tent. They decide to set up camp there. Richard disposes of the dog's carcass, and discovers that another camper, Ryan, has been following them and is secretly communicating with Sadie by cell phone. Richard later tries to confiscate Sadie's cell phone. Cynthia announces that they are going home the next day. Richard's mental state deteriorates, and is revealed that his wound was inflicted by the family's rabid dog, which he killed. Richard sleepwalks again, and awakens surrounded by mist and approached by the Jersey Devil.

Cynthia gathers the family and they leave, but Danny and Richard get ahead and disappear. Cynthia calls the police, and she and Sadie discover Ryan's disemboweled corpse, with Richard's knife nearby. They find Danny face down in the river and manage to resuscitate him. Richard returns, attacks Cynthia and breaks her leg. Sadie knocks him unconscious and ties him up. Sadie and Danny go to find help, leaving their parents. Cynthia passes out from the pain. Richard sees the Jersey Devil again and breaks free of his bonds. Cynthia knocks her husband out with a rock, but when she checks on him a few minutes later, he has vanished. Cynthia screams as she is suddenly attacked by something unseen.

Sadie and Danny are rescued by a hunter who shoots and kills a nearby cougar and leads him back to their parents. The police find the bodies of the missing campers. Richard attacks the hunter and takes his rifle. Richard aims the rifle in his family's direction. He sees the Jersey Devil behind them. For the first time, the others see it as well. Richard attempts to shoot it, but he is instead shot by Sheriff Winters who thinks that he is aiming at Sadie. The Jersey Devil attacks, kills the sheriff, and then turns on the Vineyards. A forest ranger Ranger Bob witnesses the monster's attack and flees.

Sometime later, Sadie is being interviewed by the authorities before being reunited with her brother. Her story of what she and her brother saw is dismissed as psychological trauma. Afterwards, Sadie joins Ranger Bob and a group of hunters, with the intent on hunting down the Jersey Devil.

== Cast ==
- Stephen Moyer as Richard Vineyard
- Mia Kirshner as Cynthia Vineyard
- Allie MacDonald as Sadie Vineyard
- Peter DaCunha as Danny Vineyard
- Shawn Ashmore as Dale
- Erik Knudsen as Ryan
- Athena Karkanis as Erica
- Max Topplin as Zach
- J. LaRose as Ranger Bob
- Naomi Snieckus as Monica
- David Keeley as Sheriff Winters
- Demore Barnes as Deputy Ranger
- Francois Dagenais as Jersey Devil
- Jason "Jay" Detheridge as Jersey Devil
- Tatiana Ivanova as Mother Leeds

== Production ==
Darren Lynn Bousman penned the script shortly after finishing Saw II.

Bousman originally intended to shoot the film in the actual Pine Barrens of New Jersey, but filming eventually took place in the Toronto, Ontario area for budgetary reasons with the cast and crew mainly staying in the town of Caledon. Three different forests were used for the woods.

The film was planned to be shot in 20 days. However, two days were lost due to severe rainfall. As some of the actors and crew members had other commitments immediately afterward, it had to be filmed in 18 days instead. All the daylight scenes at the campsite were filmed on a single day.

== Home media ==
The Barrens was released on Blu-ray, DVD, and digital download on October 9, 2012. Included on the Blu-ray and DVD releases is an audio commentary with director Darren Lynn Bousman and cinematographer Joseph White, as well as a deleted scene which serves as an alternative ending. In this ending, it is revealed that Sadie and Danny survived the attack by the Jersey Devil. As winter sets in, Sadie, Ranger Bob, and several others set off into the barrens, armed to the teeth, to hunt the Jersey Devil. Director Bousman considers this ending not to be canon, joking that those scenes will be "saved for the sequel".

== Reception ==
Brett Gallman from Oh, the Horror.com called the film "a missed opportunity", criticizing the film's uneven focus, and misleading marketing centering on the Jersey Devil, which was barely acknowledged in the film. In his review of the film, Gallman wrote, "The Barrens is an unfortunate bait-and-switch that bungles its intriguing setup and degenerates into a muddled, predictable routine."

Dread Central awarded the film a score of two and a half out of five. The reviewer wrote, "Overall, while I have my issues with The Barrens, I can't quite warn anyone away from watching it. It's certainly well made and well acted. And the story is an interesting one, full of twists and turns this reviewer wasn't expecting. If you’re a fan of Bousman's work, this may be worth a look for you, so long as you keep your expectations somewhat low."

== See also ==
- 13th Child
- Carny (2009 film)
- The Last Broadcast (film)
