= Standing Room Only (2003 film) =

2003 film directed by Deborra-Lee Furness

Standing Room Only is a 2003 film directed by Deborra-Lee Furness and starring Hugh Jackman, Michael Gambon and Joanna Lumley. It has been distributed as part of the compilation film Stories of Lost Souls.

== Plot ==
The film begins with Larry (Michael Gambon) walking up to a theatre door on an empty wet side street in what appears to be the West End of London. He sits by the door, passing the time, and is soon joined by a younger man, Simon (William Ash), also interested in waiting by the door. It becomes apparent that the two men are very early patrons for a show by "The Man of a Thousand Faces". As both sit waiting for the time to slowly pass, their attention gets diverted by the stunning Maria (Mary Elizabeth Mastrantonio). After gawking at her beauty, the men decide to play chess, during which Roger (Hugh Jackman) exits a taxi and starts to make his way to the group, as Granny (Andy Serkis) turns a corner heading the same way. Determined not to be left in the cold, Granny all but runs to the forming line, nearly stepping on her dog. Alas, Roger beats her. Dismayed at her defeat, she scares away the newly advancing woman, who would be the last one in line. Having scared away the Granny and her dog, and seen the show, the trio regroups by the stage door, and Simon lines the group for a picture, which one of the performers offers to take for them. After the smiles and laughing fade from the picture taking, the dog reappears and follows the cast member down the street, and the patrons put two and two together about Hunter Jackson, the 'Man of a Thousand Faces'.
