= And Now a Word from Our Sponsor =

2013 Canadian comedy-drama film

And Now a Word From Our Sponsor
- Directed by: Zack Bernbaum
- Written by: Michael Hamilton-Wright
- Produced by: Michael Hamilton-Wright
- Cinematography: Stephen C. Whitehead
- Edited by: James Vandewater
- Music by: Erica Procunier
- Production companies: Adman Productions; Ezeqial Productions; Spud Media
- Distributed by: 108 Media; Paladin
- Release date: April 27, 2013 (NBFF)
- Running time: 87 minutes
- Country: Canada
- Language: English

And Now a Word From Our Sponsor is a 2013 Canadian comedy-drama film directed by Zack Bernbaum. It stars Bruce Greenwood, Parker Posey, Allie MacDonald, Rhys Ward. Greenwood plays a burnt-out ad man who can only speak in product catch phrases.

== Premise ==
Advertising executive Adan Kundle wakes up in a hospital, able to speak only in product slogans. When Adan requires a place to stay, a volunteer at the hospital, Karen Hillridge, offers to let him stay at her house, much to her daughter Meghan's dismay. As Adan helps Karen and Meghan resolve their differences, rival executive Lucas Foster attempts to oust Adan from the advertising firm.

== Cast ==
- Bruce Greenwood as Adan Kundle
- Parker Posey as Karen Hillridge
- Callum Blue as Lucas Foster
- Allie MacDonald as Meghan Hillridge
- Rhys Ward as Jason
- Allison Dawn Doiron as Jenny

== Release ==
And Now a Word from Our Sponsor premiered on April 27, 2013, at the Newport Beach Film Festival. It was released to video on demand on May 6 and in US theaters on May 10, 2013.

== Reception ==
Rotten Tomatoes, a review aggregator, reports that 11% of nine surveyed critics gave the film a positive review; the average rating is 4.6/10. Metacritic rated it 33/100 based on 10 reviews. Peter Debruge of Variety called it a "well-cast but seldom funny satire" that misses an opportunity at social commentary. Frank Scheck of The Hollywood Reporter wrote, "Despite appealing performances, this comedy suffers from its derivative premise." Stephen Holden of The New York Times called it "a feeble, lazy descendant of Being There". Gary Goldstein of the Los Angeles Times described it as "a thoroughly engaging lark" that is saved by the cast. Mike D'Angelo of The A.V. Club gave it a letter grade of "C" and wrote, "[Greenwood] can't rescue the movie all by himself, but he does at least transform it into a first-rate acting class."
