= The Toll (2020 film) =

Canadian thriller film

- Film poster
- Directed by: Michael Nader
- Written by: Michael Nader
- Produced by: Michael Nader; Jordan Hayes; Max Topplin
- Starring: Jordan Hayes; Max Topplin
- Cinematography: Jordan Kennington
- Edited by: Michael Nader
- Music by: Torin Borrowdale
- Distributed by: Lionsgate
- Release date: October 2020 (BiFan)
- Country: Canada
- Language: English

The Toll is a 2020 Canadian horror thriller film directed by Michael Nader. The film stars Jordan Hayes and Max Topplin, with James McGowan and Rosemary Dunsmore in supporting roles. It follows a young woman (Hayes) who, after hailing a late-night ride-share, finds herself trapped with a strange driver (Topplin) on a deserted road, as the two become targets of a mysterious and malevolent force known as "The Toll Man".

The Toll premiered at the 2020 Bucheon International Fantastic Film Festival and the South by Southwest Film Festival. This was followed by a limited release and later became available on video on demand platforms due to the COVID-19 pandemic, which impacted its wider theatrical release. The film received mixed reviews from critics, with the performances of Hayes and Topplin receiving praise, while its screenplay and pacing received criticism.

== Plot ==
Spencer, a socially awkward driver, and Cami, a weary passenger, attempt to reach their destination while being haunted by a supernatural entity known as the Toll Man. As they wander through the woods, the Toll Man begins to manipulate their minds. While they are outside their car, an old woman driving a tractor approaches them and explains the Toll Man's ability to sense death. Cami pleads with the woman to contact the police and her father, but the woman insists it will be of no help.

The two decide to take a detour they had passed earlier. Along the way, Cami, increasingly unnerved, discovers an old house that both she and Spencer recognize. Inside, they find screens and a camera. Cami sits in front of the camera, and a video appears, showing a man and a woman. The woman reveals that Spencer will murder Cami. As the camera feed shows Spencer picking up a knife, Cami grabs a gun left on the table. They recall the old woman's warning that if the Toll Man cannot see them, he cannot enter their minds. The two return to the car and cover it with dark bags to obscure themselves.

However, they soon realize that only one of them must die. Spencer suddenly attacks Cami, attempting to assault her. In self-defense, Cami kills Spencer, just as her father arrives at the scene as the credits begin to roll.

== Cast ==
- Jordan Hayes as Cami
- Max Topplin as Spencer
- James McGowan as Neil
- Rosemary Dunsmore as Lorraine
- Sarah Camacho as Girl

== Release ==
On February 9, 2021, Lionsgate announced that The Toll would be released on Blu-ray and DVD on March 30, 2021.
