= Sacrifice (2011 film) =

- DVD cover
- Directed by: Damian Lee
- Written by: Damian Lee
- Produced by: Michael Baker; Lowell Conn; Robert Menzies
- Starring: Cuba Gooding Jr. Christian Slater; Devon Bostick; Lara Daans; Kim Coates
- Cinematography: David Pelletier
- Edited by: Joseph Weadick
- Music by: Steve Raiman; Zion Forrest
- Production companies: Styx Productions; Zed Filmworks
- Distributed by: Alliance Films (Canada); Millennium Entertainment (USA)
- Release date: April 26, 2011
- Running time: 100 minutes
- Countries: United States; Canada
- Language: English
- Budget: $6.8 million

Sacrifice is a 2011 American/Canadian action thriller film written and directed by Canadian film director Damian Lee, and starring Cuba Gooding Jr. and Christian Slater. It was filmed in Ottawa and Ontario. The film was produced by Zed Filmworks based in Ottawa, as well as Styx Productions. This film was released direct-to-video.

The main theme of the film is child abduction. In the film, an undercover cop is entrusted with the care of a 5-year-old girl. The girl is kidnapped shortly after, and the cop has to locate and retrieve her.

== Plot ==
A tough undercover cop named John (Cuba Gooding Jr.) inadvertently gets involved in a dangerous heroin ring when Mike (Devon Bostick), a young defector of the drug trade leaves his five-year-old sister, Angel (Arcadia Kendal) within his care. After Mike is killed, Angel is kidnapped and trapped in an underground drug ring. John then sets out to save the girl with the help of Father Porter (Christian Slater).

John is initially acquainted with the priest after the death of his family in an underground operation that went south, where his wife and daughter were the victims. His life after the murder has him finding solace in alcohol as he turns to Father Porter for salvation in his attempts to save Angel. Unbeknownst to this, Father Porter enlists in the help of John once the statues within his church are stolen by violent criminals and he too is then wrapped up in the whirlwind of this world of crime and punishment.

== Cast ==
- Cuba Gooding Jr. as John Hebron
- Lara Daans as Jade
- Christian Slater as Father Porter
- Kim Coates as Arment
- Devon Bostick as Mike Lopez
- Hannah Chantée as Noelle Hebron
- Arcadia Kendal as Angel
- Athena Karkanis as Rachel

== Production ==
The casting of this film was done by Stephanie Gorin and Ilona Smyth, the costume designer was Ton Pascal, and the production designer was Lisa Soper. This film was also executively produced by Jeff Sackman, Darren Bell, and Adrian Love. In this film Kim Coates and Stephanie Gorin were also responsible for co-executive producing.

The production began March 28, 2010 in Ottawa, Ontario on the indie crime film into late April. The reported budget of the film is $6.8 million. Although the film is set in Los Angeles and Toronto, the production team dressed the streets of Ottawa to look more like these cities while making the most of their surroundings. The film being filmed outside of Toronto had to do with the preferable provincial tax breaks given to filmmakers who film in other areas of the province. With this push, it was reported that in the year of 2011, Canadian-owned and controlled distributors were responsible for 77% of films released in Canada (both Canadian and non-Canadian films).

According to Robert Menzies of the production team "the movie has a lot of religious overtones...it's a no-holds barred action film with lots of interesting themes."

== Release ==
The film was distributed exclusively through Alliance Films in Canada on April 26, 2011. It was also released on DVD and Blu-ray in the United States through Millennium Entertainment. The international release of this film was handled through Bliss Media (China), ACE Entertainment (France), Emerald (Argentina) and Sony Pictures Home Entertainment (Australia) respectively. The release was handled by Tanweer Films for most of South Asia, including Bangladesh, Bhutan, India, Maldives, Nepal, Pakistan and Sri Lanka.
