= Mad About Mambo =

2000 romantic comedy film

- Theatrical release poster
- Directed by: John Forte
- Written by: John Forte
- Produced by: David P. Kelly
- Starring: William Ash; Keri Russell; Brian Cox
- Cinematography: Ashley Rowe
- Edited by: David Martin
- Music by: Richard Hartley
- Production companies: Gramercy Pictures; British Screen Finance; Irish Film Board; Phoenix Pictures
- Distributed by: USA Films (United States); Universal Pictures; United International Pictures (International)
- Release date: 21 July 2000 (United States)
- Running time: 92 minutes
- Countries: Ireland; United Kingdom
- Languages: English; Irish
- Box office: $65,283 (domestic)

Mad About Mambo is a 2000 romantic comedy film written and directed by John Forte. It stars William Ash, Keri Russell and Brian Cox.

== Plot ==
A boy obsessed with football finds his life changing dramatically once he adds a little Mambo. Danny plays on the football team at the all-boys Catholic school he attends in Belfast. Danny's three best friends, who also play on the team, all have different ambitions. Mickey wants to be a fashion designer to become rich and date supermodels. Gary wants to become a magician to get rich and meet beautiful women (and presumably see them in half). And Spike likes to beat people up, so he wants to become a mercenary and do it for a living. But Danny dreams of making football his life.

The players Danny most admires are South Americans, such as Pele and Carlos Riga, who he feels have a special rhythm and flexibility. Wanting to add some of these qualities to his own game, Danny has an idea: he'll take Mambo lessons, hoping that dancing like a South American will help him play like a South American. To the surprise of himself and his friends, Danny turns out to be a pretty good Latin dancer and finds himself smitten with a student in his dance class, Lucy. However, Lucy has a boyfriend, a fierce competitor on one of Danny's rival teams. The film also stars Brian Flanagan who plays an inspiring cameo role along with members of Celbridge Town Football Club.

== Cast ==
- William Ash as Danny Mitchell
- Keri Russell as Lucy McLoughlin
- Brian Cox as Sidney McLoughlin
- Maclean Stewart as Mickey
- Joe Rea as Spike
- Russell Smith as Gary
- Theo Fraser Steele as Oliver Parr
- Tim Loane as Brother McBride
- Jim Norton as Brother Xavier
- Rosaleen Linehan as Mrs Burns
- Aingeal Grehan as Mrs Mitchell
- Gavin O'Connor as Seamus Mitchell
- Alan McKee as Frank Mallon
- Julian Littman as Rudi Morelli
- Daniel Caltagirone as Carlos Rega

Jackie Fullerton also makes a cameo as himself.

== Production ==
Despite being set in Belfast, the majority of filming took place in Dublin. Filming began in May 1998.

== Reception ==
On Rotten Tomatoes the film has an approval rating of 57% based on reviews from 14 critics. John Walker, in Halliwell's Film, Video & DVD Guide, wrote: 'Oddly titled corny romance – it has nothing to do with the mambo – that is frequently implausible but gets by on the charm of its two stars.'
