= Abattoir (film) =

- Film poster
- Directed by: Darren Lynn Bousman
- Written by: Christopher Monfette
- Produced by: Jesse Berger; Brent C. Johnson
- Starring: Dayton Callie; Jessica Lowndes; Joe Anderson; Lin Shaye; Jay Huguley
- Cinematography: Michael Fimognari
- Edited by: Brian J. Smith
- Music by: Mark Sayfritz
- Production company: Dark Web Productions
- Distributed by: Momentum Pictures
- Release dates: June 7, 2016 (Los Angeles); December 9, 2016 (United States)
- Running time: 98 minutes
- Country: United States
- Language: English

Abattoir is a 2016 American horror film directed by Darren Lynn Bousman and starring Dayton Callie, Jessica Lowndes, Joe Anderson, Lin Shaye, and Jay Huguley. It was written by Christopher Monfette. It premiered at the Los Angeles Film Festival on June 7, 2016.

== Plot ==
Real estate journalist Julia Talben (Jessica Lowndes) feels unsatisfied with her current writing assignments, more interested in crime reporting, but finds some comforts in her relationship with her sister Amanda and nephew Charlie, and maintains an amicable relationship with former lover and local detective Declan Grady (Joe Anderson).

Tragedy strikes when Richard Renshaw breaks into Amanda's house and kills her family. The next morning, Renshaw calls Julia at work and apologizes to her for the murders. Julia rushes to Amanda's house, finding the shocking scene in Charlie's bedroom, while Grady apprehends an oddly-compliant Renshaw.

After her family's funeral, Julia argues with Grady, hoping to find closure by speaking with Renshaw to understand his motives, while Grady tries to convince her to move on. Grady compromises and drives her to her family's house, where they find it has already been sold not even a week since the murders occurred. Julia notes this requires sidestepping several procedures when selling real estate, and such a sale usually wouldn't be possible. Entering the house, the two find that Charlie's room has been entirely removed.

Julia confronts realtor Kyle, demanding he identify the buyer, but the buyer only left a PO box. However, Kyle recounts a similar sale earlier in his career where an elderly man bought a high rise with a recent murder and removed the room where the crime had taken place, selling the property at a loss shortly after. He gives Julia a business card from Jebediah Crone included in the closing papers, asking her to keep him removed from the investigation.

Julia and Grady perform a title search, finding shell company named Revelation Holdings bought six other properties over a 50-year period, each with a room removed after a recent tragic event. Julia interviews the current owners of the properties, confirming the stories took place in each removed room, and Crone was connected to each purchase.

Discussing the evidence with Grady, Julia again insists on speaking with Renshaw, while Grady attempts to dissuade her, pointing out that each crime had been solved when the properties had been purchased. Julia receives documentation from an adoption agency listing her home as New English, and shortly after receives a package at work from New English as well. The package contains a VHS tape that seems to depict her family's murder, but Julia notices the walls in the background aren't connected to the house. Julia suspects a connection, and learns that several other victims were originally from New English.

Julia is granted a chance to confront Renshaw, who explains that Crone is collecting tragedies. He tells Julia that the emotions attached to sudden deaths create a tear in reality, and by gathering these rooms, Crone is attempting to amplify this effect to create "the miracle of New English". He apologizes to Julia before bashing his head into the wall.

Grady once again attempts to convince Julia to stop investigating, but she ignores him, driving to New English herself. She is pulled over by the local sheriff, who explains that New English offers little development, services, or hospitality, and encourages her to leave. Investigating the town, Julia finds his warning accurate, with most people outright avoiding her, but she manages to gain access to court records and find the address of her birth mother.

Visiting the address, Julia meets current resident Allie, who informs her that her birth mother died of cancer three decades prior. Allie is much kinder to Julia than the other residents, and though she also encourages Julia to flee, she relents to Julia's questions and shares the town's history, with Jebediah Crone becoming a prominent pastor in the wake of an economic depression. The two are briefly interrupted by the arrival of Grady, who has pursued Julia to New English, agreeing to help her investigate. Allie shows the two a film reel of one of Crone's sermons, in which Crone instructs his followers to give up on asking God for help and turn to sacrifice instead, demonstrating this by restoring a disabled man's ability to walk after the crowd kills a young boy. Crone calls to build "a house of many rooms" to restore New English, and Allie explains that the townspeople followed him, committing more atrocities and pledging themselves to his cause.

Julia and Grady review new evidence together. Julia notices blood on the walls of the video sent to her, and suspects the video is staged. Grady has retrieved a report of Crone flatlining and being revived, and Julia recalls Allie saying that Crone "went to hell and brought back its secrets". While the two review newspapers and photographs in Allie's house, several people from town enter Allie's bedroom, including Crone himself, offering to "finish what we've started". Though the group does not reveal themselves to Julia and Grady, they do steal Grady's car, leaving the pair stranded.

Julia finds a photograph of Allie with Amanda as a child, realizing that Allie is her birth mother, and the sisters had been given up for adoption to be spared from becoming sacrifices. Realizing the town intends to take her as a sacrifice now, Grady and Julia begin to leave, but are stopped by a crowd of townspeople, including Crone himself. Crone tells Julia that Amanda's death was a tragedy, but also a "debt collected", and assures her that her family lives on in some form. Their conflict is interrupted by the return of the sheriff, who drives away Crone and the townspeople while warning Julia and Grady once more to leave town and not disturb Crone's project in the woods.

Ignoring the sheriff's instructions, Julia and Grady investigate the forest. They find jars containing written pledges from residents promising to offer their children as sacrifices, confirming their suspicions that a school fire that killed the child population was intentional. Deeper in the woods, they find several of the rooms torn from buildings, but before Julia can find Charlie's bedroom, the sheriff confronts them once more. The sheriff manages to physically overpower them, but rather than take them out of town, he brings them to the docks, claiming that by killing Julia there, he will spare her from Crone's plan in the forest. He is stopped by one of Crone's followers killing him instead, and Julia is kidnapped and taken into the woods.

Julia awakens in one of the removed rooms, and wandering deeper into the woods, she finds a massive house that has been constructed from other rooms. At the front door, Crone offers Julia the opportunity to leave New English and share the story without an ending, or to enter of her own free will and find her family. Julia enters the house, where she sees that each room is haunted by the spirits of the people who died inside, reliving their respective tragedies over and over. Crone explains that collecting these tragedies helps him weaken the barrier to the afterlife, before leaving Julia to search for her family.

While Julia wanders the rooms, Grady awakens in the forest in a similar manner. Upon reaching the building, Crone makes a similar offer to Grady, warning him that pursuing Julia inside would be its own tragedy, though Grady does so anyway. Julia finds Charlie's room, but is only able to see her family's deaths. Distracted by the scene, she is startled by Grady approaching her, and fatally stabs him. Crone arrives to gloat to her, explaining that this event served as another tragedy for the Abattoir, bringing the last child back to New English for another tragedy. Though Julia prepares to attack Crone, she is shot from behind by Allie, fulfilling her earlier pledge.

== Cast ==
- Dayton Callie as Jebediah Crone
- Jessica Lowndes as Julia
- Joe Anderson as Grady
- Lin Shaye as Allie
- Jay Huguley as Felix

== Production ==
In July 2009, it was reported that Radical Studios had hired Darren Lynn Bousman to write and direct Abattoir for their Radical Pictures label. Bousman developed the concept with his writing and producing partner Michael Peterson with a graphic novel to be developed by Radical to promote the film for which Bousman voiced hope would become a potential franchise. In November 2013, the film was unveiled to buyers at the American Film Market and was announced to be in pre-production with shooting scheduled to commence in early 2014 with a projected Fall 2024 release. The script, written by Christopher Monfette, was adapted from the comic book miniseries created by Bousman. According to Bousman, the underlying concept of Abattoir, centering on the mystery of someone buying homes where horrific tragedies have occurred over decades for the purpose of piecing them together, had been with him since childhood and he developed the concept with Radical. Bousman stated his purpose with the project was to try and put a new spin on the genre of haunted house horror films.

Production for the film began in 2014. It was announced in October 2014 that Joe Anderson, Dayton Callie, Jessica Lowndes and Lin Shaye had been cast.

== Reception ==
Abattoir has received negative reviews. Rotten Tomatoes gives the film a 35% approval rating with twenty reviews counted, with an average score of 4.69/10. Metacritic gave the film a 40 which illustrates "mixed or average".

Brian Tallerico writing for RogerEbert.com gave the film a half star, calling it "one of the most baffling and ineffective horror films of the year." Dennis Harvey, writing for Variety, found the film lacking in focus, saying: "In the end, Abattoir feels like a confused rehash of ideas from the variable likes of The Shining, House on Haunted Hill, Thirteen Ghosts and other haunted-house movies, albeit one so misjudged that it doesn't even get to the house itself until the last 20 minutes or so. If there were potential here, it's been garbled in translation."

On the other hand, John DeFore of The Hollywood Reporter called it: "A pulpy supernatural tale dripping with atmosphere."

John Squires of Bloody Disgusting called the film "one of the most original horror movies to come out in the last several years."

== Comic book prequel ==
In 2010, Darren Bousman developed a comicbook prequel to the film from Radical Studios. The six-issue miniseries was written by Rob Levin and Troy Peteri, with art by Bing Cansino. Bousman outlined his plans with, "I want to create a universe, and this is the beginning of a universe. I don't foresee using the comic book to be what the movie is. But it's part of the world of what the movie will exist in, and everything will stand on its own. For example, the comic book will be its own world, its own movie, its own book, its own story. The movie will be its own world, its own story, but they will all connect. All pieces of this thing connect and tell a much bigger tale... think it's important to lead into the movie. We came up with this as a script, as a feature film idea, but what we wanted to accomplish in the feature film was way, way, way too ambitious for a 90-minute movie. So we had to backtrack and set the world up that way."

== Sequel ==
A sequel to Abattoir, titled The Dwelling, was announced in May 2016, with Bousman set to write and direct and Callie to reprise his role as Jebediah Crone.
