= Anjali Jay =

British actress, writer and dancer (born 1975)

- Born: Anjali Jay; 9 August 1975 (age 50); Bangalore, India
- Occupation: Actress
- Years active: 2006–present

Anjali Jay (born 9 August 1975) is a British actress, writer and dancer. She trained as a dancer (Bharatanatyam and Contemporary) and has performed since the age of 7. Jay has had an extensive career in theatre, including working with the Royal Shakespeare company and in movies such as Night at the Museum: Secret of the Tomb, Blind Dating, and The Age of Adaline. She played Djaq in the BBC television series Robin Hood, and has had long-running roles in Supergirl (CW) and Salvation (CBS).

== Early life and education ==
Jay was born in India and grew up in Bangalore. She attended Sophia High School until 1986. She graduated with a BA degree from Mount Carmel College in 1991. Jay is trained in Bharatanatyam and contemporary dance. She went to Britain on a Charles Wallace Scholarship for her MA degree in Dance Theatre at the Laban Centre. After graduating, she performed a season with the Shobana Jaysingh Dance Company.

== Career ==
Jay appeared opposite Chris Pine in Blind Dating. Jay was praised by Jack G. Shaheen for her "heroic" portrayal of an Arab Muslim woman, Djaq, in the Robin Hood TV series.

== Acting credits ==
=== Film ===
Year	Title	Role	Notes
2006	Blind Dating	Leeza Raja	
2014	Night at the Museum: Secret of the Tomb	Shepseheret	
2015	The Age of Adaline	Cora	
2015	The 9th Life of Louis Drax	Macy	
2017	Power Rangers	Maddy Hart	
2020	Brahms: The Boy II	Dr. Lawrence	

=== Television ===
Year	Title	Role	Notes
2003	The Inspector Lynley Mysteries	Shala Malik	Episode: "Deception on His Mind"
2005	Doctors	Susie Sharma	Episode: "Trophy Life"
2006–2007	Robin Hood	Djaq	22 episodes
2009	The Fixer	Madulika	Episode: series 2, episode 6
2012	Supernatural	Dr. Kashi	Episode: "Heartache"
2014–2015	Continuum	Jacqueline (Escher's secretary)	8 Episodes
2017	A Midsummer's Nightmare	Agent Radlas	TV movie
2017	iZombie	Carey Gold	6 Episodes
2017–2020	Supergirl	Selena	11 Episodes
2018	The X-Files	Dr. Joyet	Episode: "My Struggle III"
2018	The Good Doctor	Oncologist	Episode: "More"
2018	Salvation	Dr. Rosetta Stendahl	7 episodes
2021	Debris	Priya Ferris	

=== Radio ===
- The Making of a Marchioness (2007) as Hester
- Goan Flame (2000)

=== Theatre ===
- Romeo and Juliet (2006; UK tour) as Juliet
- The Jungle Book (2004–05; UK tour) as Bagheera/ Dulia
- Anne of Green Gables (2004; Lilian Bayliss Theatre) as Katie Maurice
- Midnight's Children (2003; Royal Shakespeare Company) as Jamila.
- Tales of the Arabian Nights (2000; UK tour)
- Border Crossings production of Mappa Mundi (2000; Courtyard Theatre, Hereford)
- The Maids
- Dance Like A Man as Latah
- Vesuvius (1997; The Nehru Centre of the High Commission of India, London)
