= Paranoid (TV series) =

- Genre: Crime drama Thriller
- Written by: Bill Gallagher
- Directed by: Mark Tonderai; Kenny Glennan; John Duthie
- Starring: Indira Varma Robert Glenister Dino Fetscher Neil Stuke Lesley Sharp Christiane Paul Michael Maloney Kevin Doyle Polly Walker
- Composer: Ben Onono
- Country of origin: United Kingdom
- Original language: English
- No. of series: 1
- No. of episodes: 8

Production
- Executive producers: Bill Gallagher; Nicola Shindler
- Producer: Tom Sherry
- Running time: 45 minutes
- Production company: Red Production Company

Original release
- Network: ITV (UK); Netflix
- Release: 22 September – 10 November 2016

Paranoid is a British crime drama which began broadcasting on ITV on 22 September 2016, and streaming internationally on Netflix in 2016. The eight-part series focuses on a group of UK detectives working for the fictional Woodmere police force attempting to solve the murder of a local doctor who is stabbed at a playground. During the course of their investigation, the detectives discover the murder has links to a German pharmaceutical company and they enlist the help of their German colleagues in Düsseldorf to find the killer. Indira Varma, Robert Glenister, and Dino Fetscher star as main protagonists DS Nina Suresh, DC Bobby Day, and DC Alec Wayfield, respectively.

== Plot ==
Angela Benton, a well-liked local GP in the fictional town of Woodmere, is stabbed to death in a local playground. A team of detectives from Woodmere Police are assigned to investigate the case, including DS Nina Suresh, DC Bobby Day, DC Alec Wayfield, and their supervising officer, DI Michael Niles. They initially suspect the murderer is a local mental patient, Jacob Appley, who is under the care of psychiatrist Dr. Chris Crowley. When Appley is later found dead, his brother, Henry, is convinced that Jacob was not responsible for the murder, and has been framed by a party or parties unknown.

Meanwhile, an unidentified man dubbed the "Ghost Detective", is sending the team information and clues to evidence that could identify Angela's killer. As the investigation continues, the team discovers Angela's death could be linked to her ex-boyfriend, Ruben Locana. The team enlists the help of Düsseldorf detective Linda Felber to look into Lukana. When he is found dead face down in his swimming pool, Felber and her partner, Walti Merian, begin an investigation. A suspect in the murders is identified, but when he evades capture and flees back to Germany, Niles arranges for Bobby to travel to Düsseldorf to assist with the German investigation.

== Cast ==
=== Main ===
- Indira Varma as Detective Sergeant Nina Suresh, Woodmere Police
- Robert Glenister as Detective Constable Bobby Day, Woodmere Police
- Dino Fetscher as Detective Constable Alec Wayfield, Woodmere Police
- Neil Stuke as Detective Inspector Michael Niles, Woodmere Police
- Christiane Paul as Detective Linda Felber, Düsseldorf Polizei detective
- Lesley Sharp as Lucy Cannonbury, chief witness to Angela Benton's murder
- Michael Maloney as Chris Crowley, psychiatrist
- Kevin Doyle as the Ghost Detective
- Dominik Tiefenthaler as Detective Walti Merian, Düsseldorf Polizei detective
- Polly Walker as Monica Wayfield, Alec Wayfield's mother
- Anjli Mohindra as Police Constable Megan Waters, Woodmere Police
- Danny Huston as Nick Waingrow, Director of External Affairs, Rustin Wade Pharmaceuticals

=== Recurring ===
- Jason Done as Dennis, Nina Suresh's long-term boyfriend
- John Duttine as Eric Benton, Angela Benton's father
- William Flanagan as Luke Benton, Angela Benton's son
- Shobna Gulati as Parcival, Bobby Day's GP
- William Ash as Henry Appley, Jacob Appley's brother
- Ayda Field as Sheri, Ruben Locana's American girlfriend
- Nikol Kollars as Marquito Olivo, mother of Ruben Locana's son
- Jonathan Ojinnaka, "the bald man"
- Emma Bispham as Angela Benton, murder victim
- Daniel Drewes as Cedric Felber, Linda Felber's husband
- Isabella Pappas as Sadie Waingrow, Nick Waingrow's daughter

== Episodes ==
=== Series 1 (2016) ===
No.	Title	Directed by	Written by	Original release date	UK viewers (millions)
1	"Episode 1"	Mark Tonderai	Bill Gallagher	22 September 2016	6.38
A local GP, Angela Benton, is stabbed to death in a local playground. Woodmere Police Detective Inspector Michael Niles assigns detectives Nina Suresh, Bobby Day and Alec Wayfield to investigate the case. They soon discover, however, that the murder is much more than an open and shut case.
2	"Episode 2"	Mark Tonderai	Bill Gallagher	29 September 2016	4.82
The detectives discover that Angela's former lover, Ruben Locana, died in Düsseldorf within a week of her death. Meanwhile, Alec and Bobby decide to mount a covert investigation of their own – but when they are lured into a trap set by their prime suspect, Alec's life is left hanging in the balance.
3	"Episode 3"	Mark Tonderai	Bill Gallagher	6 October 2016	4.58
Düsseldorf Detective Linda Felber suspects that Locana's death was no accident, and that he was in fact murdered. Recovering in hospital, Alec receives a surprise visit from the Ghost Detective. Meanwhile, the search for the missing pages belonging to Angela Benton takes a shocking turn.
4	"Episode 4"	Mark Tonderai	Bill Gallagher	13 October 2016	4.41
Bobby is dispatched to Düsseldorf to help link the two cases together. Meanwhile, Niles' interference drives the Ghost Detective underground, but Nina and Alec's dogged pursuit to discover his identity leads Nina right into the killer's path.
5	"Episode 5"	Kenny Gleenan	Bill Gallagher	20 October 2016	4.35
With the Ghost Detective's identity unmasked, the team set about finding out who tried to silence him. In Düsseldorf, Bobby and Linda's investigation takes them to Rustin Wade, a pharmaceutical company linked to Locana, but someone soon takes a disliking to their digging.
6	"Episode 6"	Kenny Gleenan	Bill Gallagher	27 October 2016	4.14
Having discovered Lukana was linked to a secret drug trial known as "Mainline", the pressure on Bobby to unmask the killer is made ever greater by taunts from Rustin Wade executive Nick Waingrow. When Lucy is forced to reveal her secret past, the revelations finally tip Bobby over the edge.
7	"Episode 7"	John Duthie	Bill Gallagher	3 November 2016	4.23
The team finally secures evidence against Crowley, but cannot get the support they need from Henry Appley, who isn't convinced of Crowley's guilt. Bobby is sent back to England. Waingrow comes under increased pressure when he finds bugging devices in his house and car.
8	"Episode 8"	John Duthie	Bill Gallagher	10 November 2016	4.33
Henry Appley abducts Crowley and demands that he reveal who killed his brother; he dials the last number on Crowley's phone, which connects him (unknowingly) to Waingrow. Bobby's search for Crowley leads him into an unexpected showdown with the mysterious assassin – revealed to be working for Waingrow, and has just killed Crowley and Henry. The Düsseldorf police's net closes on Waingrow, and Nina and Alec finally accept their feelings for one another.
