= House at the End of the Street =

2012 film by Mark Tonderai

- Theatrical release poster
- Directed by: Mark Tonderai
- Screenplay by: David Loucka
- Story by: Jonathan Mostow
- Produced by: Aaron Ryder; Peter Block; Hal Lieberman
- Starring: Jennifer Lawrence; Max Thieriot; Gil Bellows; Elisabeth Shue
- Cinematography: Miroslaw Baszak
- Edited by: Steve Mirkovich; Karen Porter
- Music by: Theo Green
- Production companies: FilmNation Entertainment; A Bigger Boat Productions
- Distributed by: Relativity Media
- Release date: September 21, 2012
- Running time: 101 minutes
- Country: United States
- Language: English
- Budget: $6.9-10 million
- Box office: $44.3 million

House at the End of the Street is a 2012 American psychological thriller horror film directed by Mark Tonderai that stars Jennifer Lawrence, Max Thieriot and Elisabeth Shue. The film's plot revolves around a teenage girl, Elissa, who, along with her newly divorced mother Sarah, moves to a new neighborhood. She discovers that four years prior, the house at the end of the street was the site of a gruesome double homicide committed by a 13-year-old girl named Carrie Anne who had then disappeared without a trace. Elissa starts a relationship with Carrie Anne's older brother Ryan, who still lives in the same house, but nothing is as it appears to be.

Although filming had been completed in 2010, the film was not released until 2012 by Relativity Media. Despite being panned by critics, the film was a moderate commercial success, grossing $44.3 million.

== Plot ==
Newly-divorced doctor Sarah and her daughter Elissa move to a small, upscale suburb. They discover the house they are moving into is on the same street as the house in which a girl named Carrie Anne killed her parents four years prior. She fled and left her brother Ryan as the sole survivor. Ryan now lives alone in the house and is hated by his neighbors; Bill, a local police officer, is his only supporter.

Elissa starts seeing Ryan against Sarah's wishes. Ryan confides in Elissa that Carrie Anne fell from a swing when they were little; he was supposed to be watching her while their parents were getting high on drugs. The brain damage made her extremely aggressive, leading to their parents' murder. Ryan is revealed to be secretly taking care of a now grown Carrie Anne in the basement in the house. Carrie Anne escapes and approaches a couple in a car while brandishing a kitchen knife. Ryan accidentally kills her. Grieving, he goes to a diner and he meets a waitress named Peggy.

One night, a group of high school boys pick a fight with him; he breaks one of their legs in self-defense and flees. Elissa drives to his house and discovers the basement and Peggy, who Ryan has kidnapped and dressed as Carrie Anne. Ryan knocks Elissa unconscious.

Elissa wakes tied to a chair. Ryan tells her Carrie Anne didn't kill their parents because she died during the swing set accident and he killed their parents after they blamed him for his sister's death and began abusing him. Ryan had entered a cycle of kidnapping and killing women as Carrie Anne surrogates.

He kills Peggy and decides Elissa will become his new Carrie Anne. Bill arrives but Ryan stabs him to death. Elissa tries to escape in Ryan's car, but he traps her in the car trunk with Peggy's body. Sarah arrives and is stabbed by Ryan and Elissa escapes and shoots Ryan with Bill's gun and knocks him out with a hammer.

Elissa and Sarah move away and Ryan is placed in a psychiatric ward. He begins to hear the voices of his deceased parents calling him Carrie-Anne. A flashback reveals a young Ryan about to blow out birthday candles while dressed in girl's clothing. His mother refers to him as Carrie Anne; he protests that he is Ryan. She violently slaps him across the face in response, insisting he is Carrie Anne.

== Cast ==
- Jennifer Lawrence as Elissa Cassidy
- Max Thieriot as Ryan Jacobson
  - Bobby Osborne as Young Ryan
- Elisabeth Shue as Dr. Sarah Cassidy
- Gil Bellows as Officer Bill Weaver
- Eva Link as "Carrie Anne"
- Grace Tucker-Duguay as Carrie Anne Jacobson (flashbacks)
- Nolan Gerard Funk as Tyler Reynolds
- Allie MacDonald as Jillian
- Jordan Hayes as Peggy Johns
- Krista Bridges as Mary Jacobson (flashbacks)
- John Healy as Johnathon "John" Jacobson (flashbacks)

== Production ==
The film was originally announced in 2003 with Jonathan Mostow directing and Richard Kelly writing. The film went through development hell for seven years until production was revived in 2010 with Mark Tonderai directing and David Loucka writing, instead.

Principal photography and filming mostly took place at Algonquin College located in Ottawa, Ontario, in Metcalfe, Ontario and Carp, Ontario from August 2, 2010, until September 3, 2010.

== Release ==
The film was originally scheduled to be released in February 2012, but was moved to a September 2012 release. The film had its theatrical premiere in the United States on September 21, 2012, and was released in Canada on the same date. The film was not released theatrically in Sweden or Spain and was released direct-to-video on January 30, 2013, in Sweden and on August 28, 2013, in Spain.

=== Novelization ===
A tie-in novelization of the film was released on August 12, 2012, to accompany the movie by Little, Brown and Company.

=== Home media ===
House at the End of the Street was released on DVD and Blu-ray on January 8, 2013.

The unrated cut was also released on January 8, 2013. The extended edition increased the length of certain scenes in the final cut by a few seconds and the amount of violence, blood, and gore was increased by a small amount.

Spoilers

The extended cut also included an additional twist, in which Bill Weaver was actually a close family friend of the Jacobsons and was aware of Carrie-Anne's fate, and he also knew about Ryan's abuse but did nothing to help him. On the day of Carrie-Anne's accident, he supplied John and Mary Jacobson with drugs and actually could have prevented Carrie-Anne's death if he had not sold them the drugs, as they had prevented John and Mary from heeding the cries of their only son, and he was then disowned as a close friend by John Jacobson.

== Reception ==
=== Box office ===
The film debuted at number one at the US box office on its opening Friday and Saturday nights. In what was one of the tightest races in years for first place at the box-office weekend, the film finished the weekend at number two with $12.3 million, just less than a million behind End of Watch, which included takings from Thursday night through Monday morning, where that movie finished at number one, with $13.1 million. The film went on to gross over $44 million worldwide, from a budget of $6.9-10 million.

=== Critical response ===
On Rotten Tomatoes, the film has an approval rating of 10% based on 68 reviews with an average rating of 3.7/10. The website's critical consensus reads, "Poorly conceived, clumsily executed, and almost completely bereft of scares, House at the End of the Street strands its talented star in a film as bland as its title." On Metacritic, the film has a score of 31 out of 100 based on 19 critics, indicating "generally unfavorable" reviews. Audiences polled by CinemaScore gave the film an average grade of "B" on an A+ to F scale.

=== Awards ===
Year	Award	Category	Recipients	Result
2012	Directors Guild of Canada	Best Sound Editing – Feature Film	Mark Gingras, John D. Smith, Katrijn Halliday, Tom Bjelic, James Robb, Dale Lennon	Nominated
2013	People's Choice Awards	Favorite Movie Actress (also for Silver Linings Playbook and The Hunger Games)	Jennifer Lawrence	Won
2013	MTV Movie Award	MTV Movie Award for Best Scared-As-Shit Performance	Jennifer Lawrence	Nominated
2013	ASCAP Awards	Film Award	Theo Green	Won

== See also ==
- Longlegs
