= Stage Fright (2014 film) =

- Theatrical release poster
- Directed by: Jerome Sable
- Written by: Jerome Sable
- Produced by: Jonas Bell Pasht; Ari Lantos
- Starring: Allie MacDonald; Douglas Smith; Brandon Uranowitz; Minnie Driver; Meat Loaf Aday
- Cinematography: Bruce Chun
- Edited by: Christopher Donaldson; Lisa Grootenboer; Nicholas Musurca
- Music by: Jerome Sable; Eli Batalion
- Production companies: Serendipity Point Films; XYZ Films; Citizen Jones
- Distributed by: Entertainment One
- Release dates: March 10, 2014 (SXSW); May 9, 2014
- Running time: 88 minutes
- Country: Canada
- Language: English
- Box office: $7,078

Stage Fright is a 2014 Canadian musical comedy slasher film directed by Jerome Sable and is his feature-film directorial debut. The film had its world release on March 10, 2014 at South by Southwest, a VOD release on April 3, 2014, and a theatrical release on May 9. It stars Allie MacDonald as a hopeful young singer terrorized by a killer at a musical theater camp.

== Plot ==
In 2004, Broadway diva Kylie Swanson opened the musical The Haunting of the Opera (a reference to real-life musical The Phantom of the Opera) to a packed audience. However, that same night, she was murdered backstage by an unknown assailant wearing the mask of the play's villain, Opera Ghost. 10 years later in the present-day, Kylie's children Camilla and Buddy have grown up raised by Roger McCall, a former lover of Kylie's and the producer of a musical theater summer camp on the brink of bankruptcy. When Camilla hears that the camp will be producing a kabuki version of The Haunting of the Opera, she decides that she will sneak into auditions one way or another. She manages to convince a camper overseeing the auditions, Joel Hopton, to let her in and Camilla easily impresses the stage director Artie and wins the lead role of Sofia - much to Buddy's dismay.

As the opening day grows closer and closer, Camilla discovers that Artie will only let her perform on opening day as long as she provides him with sexual favors. He emotionally blackmails her by playing her off of Liz Silver, a camper that will do anything to perform on opening night. Camilla tries to ward off Artie's attentions by only making out with him, which disgusts Joel - whom Camilla has largely ignored since the audition. The night before the performance, Artie gives Camilla an ultimatum: either she sleeps with him or he gives the opening night performance to Liz. Camilla initially acquiesces to Artie's overtures, but decides at the last minute that she can't go through with it. After she leaves, Artie is brutally murdered by someone wearing the Opera Ghost mask, but Roger tells everyone that Artie died by car accident. Unwilling to potentially lose a visit from important Broadway agent Victor Brady, who is only willing to watch the performance if Camilla is performing, Roger manages to persuade everyone to perform opening night as planned.

That night, Joel tries to warn Camilla that Artie was killed and that the murderer is still out there, but his warnings go largely unheeded and the show begins. All seems well with the musical and Victor until later in the performance, when Opera Ghost kills campers Whitney, Sam, and Sheila, and stops Liz from taking revenge on Camilla for performing on opening night. This causes a gap in the performance, which the cast tries to fill with impromptu music and dancing while Camilla looks for her missing co-star. She instead finds an ever-increasing number of bodies.

Camilla manages to intervene when she discovers Opera Ghost trying to kill Roger. This killer is revealed to be Buddy, who says that he did it because he did not want Camilla to get involved in the acting world, which he saw as corrupt. Buddy tells Camilla that Roger is the one who killed their mother in a jealous rage. He spent the past 10 years trying to avenge his mother's death, and he wants to kill whoever who's close to Roger. Roger learns the truth, turns violent, manages to free himself, and attacks Buddy, fatally stabbing him to death. He decides to kill Camilla because her brother wanted to kill him. Roger chases Camilla throughout the camp and corners her backstage. Just as Roger is about to kill Camilla, she finds a buzz saw and kills him and stumbles onto stage. The audience initially assumes that this was all part of the show and applauds what they believe to be the finale.

The film then cuts to the Broadway revival of The Haunting of the Opera with Camilla as the lead. As she prepares backstage, Opera Ghost lunges out of the mirror at Camilla, only for it to be a hallucination.

== Cast ==
- Allie MacDonald as Camilla Swanson
  - Ella Querin as young Camilla
- Minnie Driver as Kylie Swanson
- Meat Loaf Aday as Roger McCall
- Douglas Smith as Buddy Swanson
  - Brian Bridger as young Buddy
- Kent Nolan as Joel Hopton
- Brandon Uranowitz as Arthur Phillippe "Artie" Getz
- Ephraim Ellis as Sam Brownstein
- Melanie Leishman as Liz Silver
- Thomas Alderson as David Martin
- James McGowan as Victor Brady
- Steffi DiDomenicantonio as Bethany
- Darren Summersby as Tobe
- Ryan Bobkin as Bobkin
- Leanne Miller as Sheila Kerry
- Adrianna Di Liello as Lithpy
- Chelsey Pozdyk as Whitney
- Rick Miller as the voice of The Metal Killer
- Dan Levy as Entertainment Reporter

== Reception ==
Critical reception has been mixed to negative. As of June 2020 The film has a 37% approval rating on Rotten Tomatoes based on 51 reviews, with an average score of 5.05/10. The website's consensus reads, "There might be a good movie to be made from mashing up the slasher and musical genres; unfortunately, Stage Fright isn't quite it." Metacritic reports a score of 39/100 based on the opinions of 13 critics, indicating "Generally unfavorable reviews".

Fearnet gave the film a positive review and remarked that while the film wasn't particularly scary, it was also "occasionally creepy and frequently quite gory". We Got This Covered and The Austin Chronicle also praised the film, with the latter commenting that it was "the best unconventional operetta since South Park: Bigger, Longer, and Uncut." Flickering Myth concluded "A few more musical numbers and a bigger death toll could have pushed the rating up, but for what it is Stage Fright is a hilarious riot", while Cinevue's review noted "Horror, comedy and musical are all at play and, under the masterful hand of writer and director Jerome Sable, make for deliciously gory fun".

Since its box-office release the film has had some more positive reevaluations, appearing on lists and in articles of underrated films.
