= Athena Karkanis =

Canadian television actress (born 1981)

- Born: September 7, 1981 (age 45); Lethbridge, Alberta, Canada
- Occupation: Actress
- Years active: 1996–present
- Children: 2

Athena Karkanis (born September 7, 1981) is a Canadian television, film and voice actress. She played Grace Stone in the NBC/Netflix science fiction drama series Manifest, and voiced Aviva Corcovado from Wild Kratts.

== Life and career ==
Karkanis was born in Lethbridge, Alberta, and raised in Toronto. She is of Greek and Egyptian descent. In 2005, she made her screen debut in an episode of 1-800-Missing and later had a number of guest-starring, recurring and regular roles on Canadian television shows. She also had regular voice roles in Skyland, MetaJets, Julius Jr., Total Drama: Revenge of the Island, Dino Ranch and My Little Pony: Make Your Mark. She has a regular voice role in Wild Kratts as Aviva Corcovado. Karkanis was also the lead voice for the title character in Growing Up Creepie.

Karkanis co-starred in several horror films, including Saw IV (2007), Repo! The Genetic Opera (2008), Saw VI (2009), Survival of the Dead (2009), and The Barrens (2012). She also appeared in direct-to-video action films The Art of War II: Betrayal (2008), and Sacrifice (2011). On television, she was a regular cast member in the first season of Canadian teen drama The Best Years in 2007, in The Border from 2008 to 2010, and in the short-lived comedy series Almost Heroes in 2011. She also had a recurring role in Lost Girl from 2011 to 2012.

Karkanis starred in the AMC drama series Low Winter Sun in 2013. In 2014, she was cast as a series regular in the Lifetime post-apocalyptic drama series, The Lottery. In 2015, she began playing the role of Octavia Muss on The Expanse. From 2018 to 2022, Karkanis played Grace Stone on the TV series Manifest on NBC (seasons 1–3) and on Netflix (seasons 1–4).

== Filmography ==
=== Film ===
| Year | Title | Role | Notes |
|---|---|---|---|
| 2005 | The Care Bears' Big Wish Movie | Harmony Bear | Voice, direct-to-video |
| 2007 | Saw IV | Agent Lindsey Perez | |
| 2008 | The Art of War II: Betrayal | Heather | Direct-to-video |
| 2008 | Saw V | Agent Lindsey Perez | Archive footage |
| 2008 | Repo! The Genetic Opera | Female Repo Victim | |
| 2008 | Tomboy | Alex | Short film |
| 2009 | Survival of the Dead | Tomboy | |
| 2009 | Saw VI | Agent Lindsey Perez | |
| 2011 | Sacrifice | Rachel | |
| 2012 | The Barrens | Erica | |
| 2013 | Foxed! | Emily | Short film |
| 2013 | Subconscious Password | The Babysitter | Voice, short film |
| 2016 | Spark | Koko | Voice |
| 2019 | Break In Break Out | Tamara | Short film |
| 2023 | Paw Patrol: The Mighty Movie | Additional Voices | Voice |

=== Television ===
| Year | Title | Role | Notes |
|---|---|---|---|
| 1996–98 | Stickin' Around | Various | Recurring voice role |
| 2003 | Chappelle's Show | Educated Guess Announcer | Voice, 1 episode |
| 2003 | Franny's Feet | Various | Recurring voice role |
| 2004 | Kevin Hill | Annalisa / Lina | 2 episodes |
| 2005 | Missing | Tamara Corday | Episode: "Phoenix Rising" |
| 2005 | Kojak | Gabriella Bustar | Episode: "East Sixties" |
| 2005 | Delilah and Julius | Zoe Ling | 7 episodes |
| 2006–07 | Skyland | Diwan | Voice, main role (27 episodes) |
| 2006–08 | Growing Up Creepie | Creepella "Creepie" Creecher / Various | Voice, main role (26 episodes) |
| 2007 | The Best Years | Dawn Vargaz | Main role; 13 episodes |
| 2008–10 | The Border | Agent Khalida "Khali" Massi / Salah Karim | 12 episodes |
| 2009 | Dex Hamilton: Alien Entomologist | Bream | Voice, episode: "A Fish Tale" |
| 2009 | Nerdland | Patty | Voice, television film |
| 2009 | Guns | Ines Mendoza | Television miniseries |
| 2009 | U.S. Attorney | Marlene Rodriguez | Television film |
| 2009 | The Dating Guy | Diana | Voice, episode: "Captain Petard" |
| 2009 | Too Late to Say Goodbye | Liz | Television film |
| 2009–2011 | Producing Parker | Sally, Mimi Chiu, Latino Lesbian | Voice, 3 episodes |
| 2010 | Dex Hamilton: Fire and Ice | Herman / Computer voice | Television film |
| 2010 | Degrassi: The Next Generation | Rachel | Episode: "Don't Let Me Get Me: Part 1" |
| 2010 | Sundays at Tiffany's | Talk Show Host | Television film |
| 2011 | Republic of Doyle | Heather Smith | Episode: "Live and Let Doyle" |
| 2011 | InSecurity | Paloma | Episode: "El Negotiator" |
| 2011 | XIII: The Series | Maria Cardenas | Episode: "Costa Verde" |
| 2011 | Covert Affairs | Shireen | Episode: "Bang and Blame" |
| 2011 | Almost Heroes | Rayna | 8 episodes |
| 2011 | MetaJets | Flygirl | Main voice role |
| 2011 | The Ron James Show | Nurse | Voice, 3 episodes |
| 2011 | Certain Prey | Marcy Sherrill | Television film |
| 2011–12 | Conquer the Kairu | | Voice, 15 episodes |
| 2011–12 | Lost Girl | Nadia | 7 episodes |
| 2011–present | Wild Kratts | Aviva Corcovado, Nua | Main voice role |
| 2012 | Total Drama: Revenge of the Island | Anne Maria | Voice, 8 episodes |
| 2012 | Detentionaire | Kimmie McAdams | Voice, episode: "The Candidate" |
| 2012 | Supernatural | Andrea Kormos | Episode: "Blood Brother" |
| 2012 | Transporter: The Series | Mauga | 2 episodes |
| 2012 | Murdoch Mysteries | Dr. Iris Bajjali | Episode: "Evil Eye of Egypt" |
| 2012 | The Firm | Wendy | Episode: "Chapter 20" |
| 2013 | The Listener | Crown Prosecutor Krista Ellis | Episode: "Witness for the Prosecution" |
| 2013 | Low Winter Sun | Dani Khalil | Main role (10 episodes) |
| 2013 | Skatoony | Anne Maria | Episode: "Style Trial" |
| 2013–14 | Julius Jr. | Sheree, Sidney, additional voices | Voice, 51 episodes |
| 2014 | Remedy | Gwen Devoe | Episode: "The Beast Within" |
| 2014 | The Lottery | Vanessa Keller | 10 episodes |
| 2015 | Murdoch Mysteries | Dr. Iris Bajjali | Episode: "Murdoch and the Temple of Death" |
| 2015 | Young Drunk Punk | Gayle | Episode: "European Style" |
| 2015–16 | The Expanse | Octavia Muss | 7 episodes |
| 2016 | Poor Richard's Almanack | Penny Richards | Unsold television pilot |
| 2016 | Fugget About It | Anna | Voice, episode: "Spicy Apocalypse" |
| 2016 | Looped | Claire | Voice, 5 episodes |
| 2017 | Mysticons | Imani Firewing, Quasarla, Lateensia | Voice, recurring role |
| 2017 | Suits | Marissa | 2 episodes |
| 2017 | Ransom | Angela Rose | Episode: "The Box" |
| 2017 | Zoo | Abigail Westbrook | 12 episodes |
| 2018–23 | Manifest | Grace Stone | Main role (43 episodes) |
| 2018 | House of Cards | Melody Cruz | 5 episodes |
| 2019 | Corn & Peg | Miss Rider | 1 episode |
| 2021–24 | Dino Ranch | Jane, Tango | Main voice role |
| 2022–23 | My Little Pony: Make Your Mark | Opaline Arcana | Main voice role |
| 2025 | The Handmaid's Tale | Ellen | |
| 2023–present | Work It Out Wombats! | Kat | Voice, 9 episodes |

=== Video games ===
| Year | Title | Role |
|---|---|---|
| 2005 | Tom Clancy's Rainbow Six: Vegas | Joanna Torres |
| 2010 | World of Warcraft: Cataclysm | Gilnean NPC |
| 2011 | Star Wars: The Old Republic | Jedi Consular Female |
| 2012 | Diablo III | Barbarian - Female |
| 2012 | World of Warcraft: Mists of Pandaria | Aysa Cloudsinger, Lu'lin, Ki |
| 2013 | Star Wars: The Old Republic - Rise of the Hutt Cartel | Jedi Consular Female |
| 2014 | Diablo III: Reaper of Souls | Barbarian - Female |
| 2014 | World of Warcraft: Warlords of Draenor | |
| 2014 | Star Wars: The Old Republic - Shadow of Revan | Jedi Consular Female |
| 2015 | Star Wars: The Old Republic - Knights of the Fallen Empire | Jedi Consular Female |
| 2015 | Heroes of the Storm | Sonya |
| 2016 | Maize | Ruby Queen |
| 2016 | Far Cry Primal | |
| 2016 | Star Wars: The Old Republic - Knights of the Eternal Throne | Jedi Consular Female |
| 2019 | Star Wars: The Old Republic - Onslaught | Jedi Consular Female |
| 2022 | Star Wars: The Old Republic - Legacy of the Sith | Jedi Consular Female |
| 2022 | My Little Pony: A Maretime Bay Adventure | Zoom Zephyrwing |
