= Working Tra$h =

- Genre: Comedy
- Written by: Joe Kierland; Jon Connolly; David Loucka
- Directed by: Alan Metter
- Starring: George Carlin; Ben Stiller; Buddy Ebsen; Leslie Hope; Michael J. Pollard
- Music by: Trevor Lawrence; Bob Mithoff
- Country of origin: United States
- Original language: English

Production
- Producer: Andrew Sugerman
- Cinematography: Brian Capener
- Editor: Sharyn L. Ross
- Running time: 90 mins
- Production company: Aurora Development Fund (in association with) FNM Films

Original release
- Network: Fox Network
- Release: November 26, 1990

Working Tra$h is a 1990 American made-for-television comedy film directed by Alan Metter and starring George Carlin, Ben Stiller, Buddy Ebsen, Leslie Hope, and Michael J. Pollard. It was one of the first television films made for the then-burgeoning Fox Network.

== Cast ==
- George Carlin as Ralph (referred to as "Ralph Sawatzky" in a scene at the end of the film, though the surname is not shown in the credits)
- Ben Stiller as Freddy Novak
- Buddy Ebsen as Vandevere Lodge
- Leslie Hope as Susan Fahnestock
- Michael J. Pollard as Palomar
- Jack Blessing as R. Judson Kimbrough
- Dan Castellaneta as George Agrande
- Ellen Ratner as Ruthie
- George Wallace as Big Dan
- Mindy Sterling as Mary
- Lisa Montgomery as Vi
- Michael Gregory as Real Cop
- Gregg Almquist as Herb
- Julian Christopher as Moneyline Reporter
- Newell Alexander as News Reporter
