= Death of Me (film) =

2020 horror film by Darren Lynn Bousman

- Official release poster
- Directed by: Darren Lynn Bousman
- Written by: Ari Margolis; James Morley III; David Tish
- Produced by: Lee Nelsen; David Tish; Charles Dorfman
- Starring: Maggie Q; Luke Hemsworth
- Cinematography: Jose David Montero
- Edited by: Brian J. Smith
- Music by: Mark Sayfritz
- Production companies: Samuel Marshall Films; 13 Films; Media Finance Capital; Envision Media Arts
- Distributed by: Saban Films
- Release date: October 2, 2020
- Running time: 94 minutes
- Country: United States
- Language: English
- Box office: $292,271

Death of Me is a 2020 American horror film directed by Darren Lynn Bousman, from a screenplay by Ari Margolis, James Morley III, and David Tish. It stars Maggie Q, Alex Essoe, and Luke Hemsworth.

It was released on October 2, 2020, by Saban Films.

== Plot ==
An American couple, Christine and Neil, wake up in their hotel room that is messy and in disarray, and they also find themselves covered in dirt and grass with no recollection of any past events while vacationing on a remote island in Thailand. Christine realises that their flight is about to leave, so they take the ferry back to the mainland, but their passports are missing, and they cannot leave the island, so they must return to the tourist hotel owned by Samantha, where they've been staying.

They wondered what they'd been doing the previous night, so they checked the recordings of their past events, including visiting a bar, and a bar waitress, Madee, gave Christine a necklace. On that night, they witnessed themselves drugged before Neil attempted to sexually assault Christine and choke her to death. Scared, Neil buries Christine in the grass. Neil claims that they were drugged from one of the drinks they had and denies everything that happened. Christine then notices that she has bruises on her neck and vomits grass and dirt from her mouth, indicating that everything that night did happen.

Christine and Neil check with a local doctor and tell him that the bartender put drugs into their drinks and show him the footage of the incident, but the doctor dismisses their evidence. While recuperating, they are disturbed by the local residents' upcoming festival that depicts pictures of Christine. Neil wants to know about the festival, so he leaves to investigate. Christine suddenly gets sick and goes to the restroom, pulling a snake from her mouth. Meanwhile, Neil records the festival when one of the locals snatches his phone and deletes the footage of Christine and Neil before he recovers it.

Christine hallucinates herself being surrounded by women with their eyes and mouths sewn shut, as they inject blood into her. Neil finds her, and Christine sees Madee and follows her to a tattoo shop. The artist, Kanda, sees the necklace and tells her it was a special gift for Christine since it was said that the artifact contained spiritual magic. Neil bribes Kanda about the waitress, and Kanda tells them that she is at a different bar. The couple arrive at the bar, and Madee returns Neil's passport, but Christine's is missing. They return to the hotel and Samantha offers them a drink while waiting for a fisherman to take them back to the mainland.

Neil enters a hypnotic trance and is told by the fisherman to kill himself, so he takes a knife and disembowels himself in front of Christine before falling into the sea and passing out. She wakes up back in the room and reports Neil's death to a policeman, but he doesn't believe her. She starts to hallucinate again and finds Neil's body, along with a dozen others, before regaining her senses. She and Samantha rush back to the bar, where she has hallucinations again of women with their eyes and mouths sewn shut before waking up back in the tourist room. She experiences stomach pain and is taken to the local doctor, who reveals that she is pregnant. Christine becomes frightened of an ultrasound image looking monstrous and flees.

She confronts Kanda, who reveals that the reason she's alive despite being killed is that she's stuck in a spiritual plane where she was supposed to be buried by her husband as a sacrifice, and they've been burying pregnant women so that the island can remain safe. Christine hides from the local doctor, who forces Kanda to drink the drug to make her kill herself in a hypnotic trance. Christine grabs the gun and tries to flee but learns that Samantha is also involved after she was healed of her cancer, so Christine shoots Samantha, killing her. She again tries to flee but is captured by the locals. They tie her up, and Madee begins to sew one of her eyes shut, when Christine breaks free from her restraints.

As the storm approaches, Christine escapes in the boat. The storm ravages the island, killing all the inhabitants and Christine. Rescuers recover the bodies, and one of them places the necklace next to Christine's dead body, allowing its magic to resurrect her.

== Cast ==
- Maggie Q as Christine
- Luke Hemsworth as Neil
- Alex Essoe as Samantha
- Kat Ingkarat as Madee
- Kelly B. Jones as Kanda

== Production ==
In July 2018, it was announced that Maggie Q and Luke Hemsworth had been set to star in the film, with Darren Lynn Bousman directing from a screenplay by Ari Margolis, James Morley III and David Tish. In August 2018, Alex Essoe also joined the cast.

== Release ==
In August 2019, Saban Films acquired distribution rights to the film. It was released on Digital and On Demand October 2, 2020. The film was then released on DVD and Blu-ray on November 17, 2020.

=== Box office ===
A wide theatrical release was cancelled due to the ongoing COVID-19 pandemic at the time, so the theatrical release instead occurred overseas in countries where theaters had started to open up. The film grossed $292,271 internationally.

== Reception ==
On review aggregator Rotten Tomatoes, the film has an approval rating of 33%, based on 43 reviews, with an average rating of 4.2/10. The website's consensus reads, "Despite a handful of decent jolts and Maggie Q's committed performance, Death of Me's intriguing premise is undone by its listless and largely scare-free execution." On Metacritic, the film has a weighted average score of 31 out of 100, based on four critics, indicating "generally unfavorable" reviews.
