= Jordan Hayes =

Canadian actress

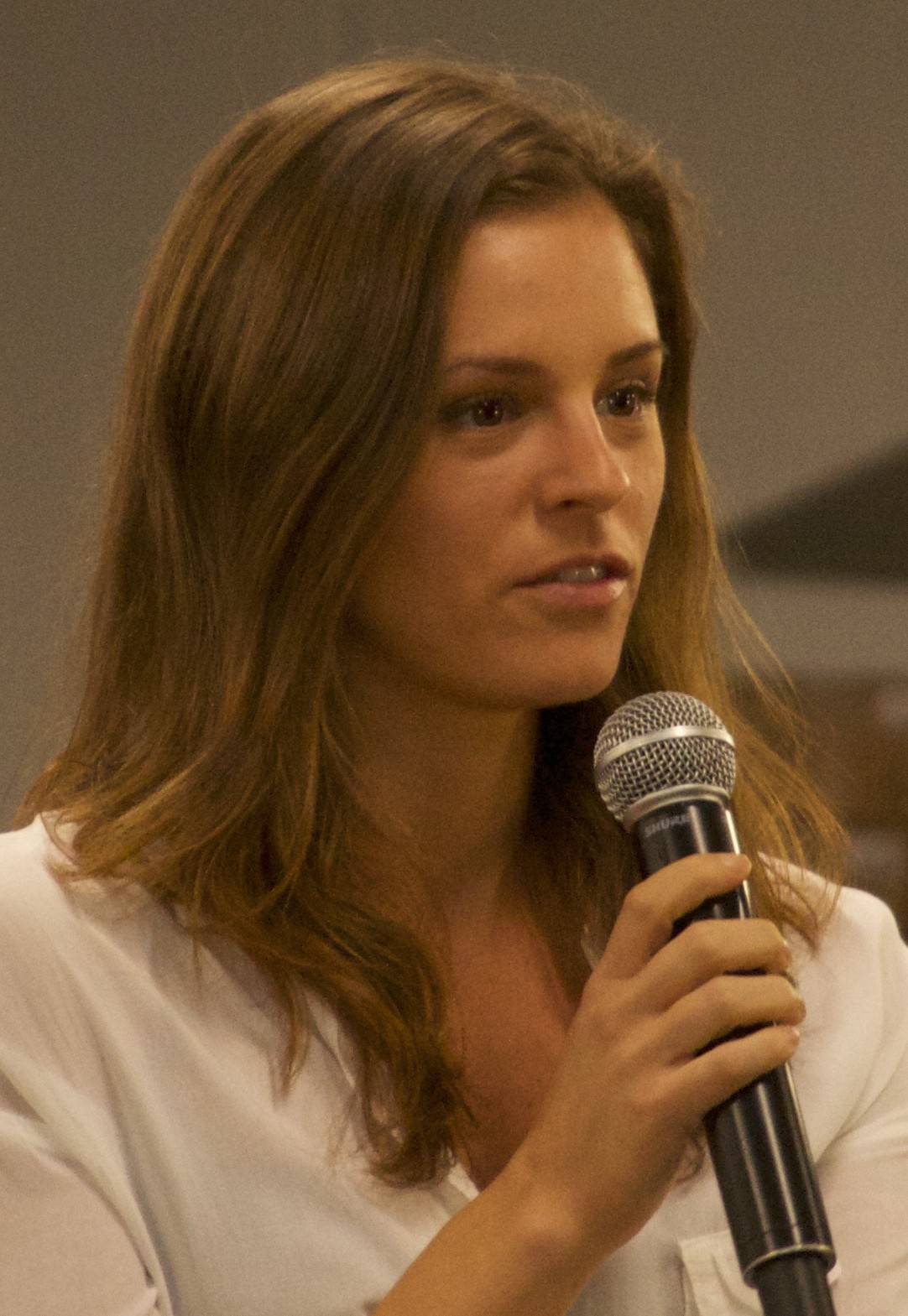
- Born: June 14, 1987 (age 39); Montreal, Quebec, Canada
- Occupation: Actress
- Years active: 2008–present

Jordan Hayes (born June 14, 1987) is a Canadian actress. She played Dr. Sarah Jordan on Syfy's Helix.

She has also appeared in theatrical films, such as House at the End of the Street, The F Word and Hidden 3D.

In addition, she has directed and written two short films Lay Over (2013) and Ten Speed (2014).

== Personal life ==
Jordan Hayes was born in Montreal and grew up in Aylmer, Quebec.

Her favourite sport was soccer; she even played in the AAA boys league between the ages of 13 and 16.

In college, she originally studied in a "pre-med type program" before transferring to the theatre program.

She had just moved to Los Angeles, California, U.S.A. shortly before she auditioned for Helix. Once she got the role, she moved back to Montreal.

== Career ==
Hayes debuted as an actress in the 2008 short film Dissolved Girl. Though not intentional, a lot of her work has been in the horror and sci-fi genre.

Her guest television appearances include Nikita, Being Erica, Flashpoint, The Firm, Air Emergency and Transporter: The Series.

Her breakout role was Dr. Sarah Jordan on Helix. The television series premiered on Showcase in Canada and Syfy in the U.S., in January, 2014 and ran for two seasons before cancellation.

In 2013, she made a directorial debut with the short film Lay Over, which she also wrote, edited and starred in. The film was made by a group of actors from Canada. She has also directed and written a second short film titled Ten Speed.

In 2016 she was cast for the USA Network-pilot Poor Richard's Almanack.

== Filmography ==
=== Actress ===
==== Films ====
Year	Film	Role	Notes
2011	Exit Humanity	Emma	
2011	Hidden 3D	Vicky	
2012	House at the End of the Street	Peggy Johns	
2013	The F Word	Becky	
2015	Almost Anything	Chris	
2020	The Toll	Cami	
2026	I Come Home	Kat	

==== Television ====
Year	Show	Role	Notes
2009	Ghostly Encounters	Kelly Baker	Episode: "Closing the Door to the Beyond"
2010	Being Erica	Jessica	Episode: "Being Adam"
2010	Nikita	Elizabeth	Episode: "One Way"
2011	Air Emergency	Ellyce Kausner	Episode: "Stalled in the Sky"
2011	Flashpoint	Franca	Episode: "Wild Card"
2012	The Firm	Jenny LaFleur	Episode: "Chapter Seventeen"
2012	Crisis Point	Tanya	TV movie
2013	Transporter: The Series	Stranded Motorist	Episode: "Give the Guy a Hand"
2014–2015	Helix	Dr. Sarah Jordan	26 episodes
2016	Poor Richard's Almanack	Madison	
2017	Conviction	Sophie Hausen	Episode: "Not Okay"

=== Director and screenwriter ===
- Lay Over (2013, short film)
- Ten Speed (2015, short film)
