= Blind Dating =

- Theatrical release poster
- Directed by: James Keach
- Written by: Christopher Theo
- Produced by: David Shanks; James Keach; Joy Mellins
- Starring: Chris Pine; Eddie Kaye Thomas; Anjali Jay; Stephen Tobolowsky; Jane Seymour
- Cinematography: Julio Macat
- Edited by: Larry Bock
- Music by: Heitor Pereira
- Distributed by: Samuel Goldwyn Films LLC
- Release dates: July 2006 (Stony Brook Film Festival); May 11, 2007 (United States)
- Running time: 99 minutes
- Country: United States
- Language: English
- Box office: $945,718

Blind Dating (also known as Blind Guy Driving) is a 2006 American romantic comedy film directed by James Keach and starring Chris Pine, Eddie Kaye Thomas, Anjali Jay, Jane Seymour, and Jayma Mays. The film was produced by David Shanks and James Keach and distributed by Samuel Goldwyn Films LLC. It was given a limited theatrical release on May 11, 2007.

The film received mixed to negative reviews. The film was not given a release in the UK until 2009, when Pine's film Star Trek was released.

== Plot ==
Danny Valddesechi is an intelligent, handsome, charming boy who happens to be blind. Having been blind from birth, he volunteers for a risky experimental visual prosthesis that may restore his sight—having a microchip installed in the visual cortex of his brain that connects to a camera that would give him only, at best, fuzzy black and white images. During the tests he meets a beautiful Punjabi nurse, Leeza. Meanwhile, because Danny is a virgin at 22, his brother Larry, who runs a limousine service, gets him a string of hilariously disastrous blind dates in between rentals.

When Danny finally realizes that he is falling for Leeza, she tells him she cannot see him anymore because she has been promised in an arranged marriage. Believing that Leeza did not pursue their relationship because of his being blind, Danny becomes depressed and stops taking the necessary tests for his brain surgery. Danny's family, his eccentric psychotherapist Dr. Evans and eye doctor Dr. Perkins advise him to continue because it is his only chance of seeing, and soon Danny is successfully operated on. He sees his family's faces for the first time, but not Leeza's, who was away, reluctantly preparing for her engagement party. Soon the experiment proves to be a failure, as the fragile prosthesis in his brain moves, clouding his already weak vision, and Danny goes back to being blind.

Realizing that he really loves Leeza, he bursts into the engagement party, professing his love for her and saying "Love is how you speak to me. Love is how you touch me...and guide me showing me the way to go. And when we kiss, when we kiss, it moves me to my soul." The couple kiss. At this the marriage is called off and Danny and Leeza start over, learning more about each other's family and culture.

== Cast ==
- Chris Pine as Danny
- Anjali Jay as Leeza
- Frank Gerrish as Angelo
- Eddie Kaye Thomas as Larry/Lorenzo
- Jane Seymour as Dr. Evans
- Jodi Russell as Mrs. Van de Meer
- Stephen Tobolowsky as Dr. Perkins
- Jayma Mays as Mandy
- Jennifer Alden as Jasmine
- Pooch Hall as Jay
- Sendhil Ramamurthy as Arvind
- John Boccia as Jonnie
- Judith Benezra as Heidi
- Katy Mixon as Suzie
- Iqbal Theba as Mr. Raja

== Production ==
In May and June 2005, filming locations included Ogden, Utah, with production based in Salt Lake City.

== Critical reception ==
On review aggregate website Rotten Tomatoes, Blind Dating has an approval rating of 25% based on 24 reviews, with an average rating of 4.2/10. The website's critics consensus reads, "Nicely cast but clumsily directed, Blind Dating smothers its leads' chemistry in a wildly uneven and mostly unmemorable romantic comedy with far too little of either."

Peter Bradshaw of The Guardian wrote, "The standard of acting and directing is at a very low ebb, and as Danny's therapist, Jane Seymour bafflingly and embarrassingly reprises the horny-older-woman routine she showed us in the Owen Wilson/Vince Vaughn comedy Wedding Crashers." Ben Rawson-Jones of the Digital Spy said that while "the structure and premise of the story aren't too bad at all…this serious scenario is littered with a plethora of lazily-conceived supposedly 'comic' caricatures that drag us kicking and screaming into a world of surreal tedium instead". William Thomas of Empire called the film "a muddled mix of fratboy comedy, disability drama and cross-cultural romance".
