= The Happys =

- Film poster
- Directed by: Tom Gould and John Serpe
- Written by: Tom Gould and John Serpe
- Produced by: Will Bethencourt; Dave O'Brien; Morgan R. Stiff
- Starring: Amanda Bauer; Jack DePew; Janeane Garofalo; Melissa McBride; Rhys Ward; Arturo Del Puerto
- Cinematography: Philips Shum
- Edited by: Terel Gibson
- Music by: Pat Sansone
- Distributed by: Indican Pictures
- Release dates: August 14, 2016 (Rhode Island International Film Festival); March 16, 2018 (United States)
- Running time: 87 minutes
- Country: U.S.
- Language: English

The Happys is an American narrative film written and directed by Tom Gould and John Serpe, commercially released in 2018 after screening at a dozen film festivals in the United States, winning the Alternative Spirit Award at Rhode Island International Film Festival, the Best Narrative Feature award at the Durango Independent Film Festival, the Audience Award at the Anchorage International Film Festival, and a nomination for the Best Feature Award at the Naperville Independent Film Festival in Naperville, Illinois. The movie's public premiere took place in California on March 16, 2018.

== Plot ==
A midwestern boyfriend and girlfriend move to California so that the young man may pursue a career as an actor. The young woman walks in on her boyfriend when he is having an affair with another man. After that, they face challenges in their careers and personal lives as the young woman seeks her own direction, with the friendship and support of eclectic neighbors in their neighborhood, Los Feliz (which roughly translates to "The Happys").

== Cast ==
- Janeane Garofalo as Luann
- Amanda Bauer as Tracy
- Jack DePew as Mark
- Melissa McBride as Krista
- Rhys Ward as Sebastian
- Arturo Del Puerto as Ricky
- Cathy Ladman as Paula
- Brian Jordan Alvarez as Patrick
- Stephen Guarino as Jonathan
- Will Bethencourt as Tomas

== Production ==
When Gould and Serpe completed the script of The Happys, Gould sent the script to Garofalo and met her for coffee, and she agreed to play Luann even though Garofalo saw the character as completely dissimilar to herself. In March 2015, a crowdfunding campaign was created to raise funds for the film's production costs. When crowdfunding was under way, Garofalo allowed her name to be used in promotion and made jewelry to help raise funds. At the close of the crowdfunding campaign, $73,620 had been raised by 619 contributors. The Happys was filmed in Los Angeles, with principal photography completed in April 2015, and post-production finalized in July 2016.

== Release ==
The Happys premiered in August 2016 at the Rhode Island International Film Festival, where the film won the Alternative Spirit Award. In October 2016, The Happys was an official selection in Taste of Film program at the MiFo Outshine Film Festival in Fort Lauderdale, Florida. In November 2016, The Happys was an official selection at the St. Louis International Film Festival, in St. Louis, Missouri, and the Reedy Reels Film Festival in Greenville, South Carolina. At the Anchorage International Film Festival in December 2016, The Happys won the Audience Award.

In February 2017, The Happys was an official LBGTQ films selection at the Oxford Film Festival in Oxford, Mississippi, and an official selection at the Sedona International Film Festival in Sedona, Arizona. In March 2017, The Happys was awarded the Best Narrative Feature award at the Durango Independent Film Festival, Durango, Colorado, and was an official selection at the Green Mountain Film Festival in Montpelier, Vermont.

In April 2017, The Happys was an official selection at the Julien Dubuque International Film Festival in Dubuque, Iowa, and at the Phoenix Film Festival in Scottsdale, Arizona. The Happys was nominated for the Best Feature Award in September 2017 at the Naperville Independent Film Festival in Naperville, Illinois.

The theatrical premiere of The Happys took place on March 16, 2018, in California.

=== Critical reception ===
Responding to festival screenings of The Happys, critics called the movie "one ironically fun film about what it means to be happy" that "jumps fearlessly into its subject matter." Variety described The Happys as a "middling work," The Hollywood Reporter wrote that it is a "quirky, insiderish L.A. dramedy," the Los Angeles Times said it was "a cutesy classic Hollywood tale adapted for modern times," and The Advocate called The Happys "charming and thoughtful."
