= David Loucka =

American screenwriter

- Occupation: Screenwriter
- Writing career
- Language: English
- Genres: Screenwriting, film, television, comedy, horror

David Loucka is an American screenwriter, active in the comedy and horror genres.

Loucka wrote the screenplay for the 2012 Jennifer Lawrence horror film House at the End of the Street.

== Writing credits ==
- Monsters (TV episode "Holly's House", 1988)
- The Dream Team (1989)
- Working Tra$h (TV 1990)
- Eddie (1996)
- Borderline (2002)
- Dream House (2011)
- House at the End of the Street (2012)
- Rings (2017)
