= MetaJets =

South Korean-Canadian animated television series

- Canadian teaser poster
- Genre: Science fiction; Action; Aeronautics; Adventure
- Created by: Peter M. Lenkov; David Wolkove
- Directed by: Paul Hunt; Yong-Ho Kim
- Voices of: Jamie Haydon-Devlin; Scott McCord; Katie Griffin; Mpho Koaho; Steve Cumyn; Ivan Sherry; Athena Karkanis; David Berni; Jonathan Koensgen
- Composers: Brian Pickett; Graeme Cornies; James Chapple; David Kelly
- Countries of origin: South Korea; Canada
- Original language: English
- No. of seasons: 1
- No. of episodes: 40

Production
- Executive producers: Michael Hirsh; Toper Taylor; Pamela Slavin; Han-Young Kang; Moon-Ju Kang
- Producers: Ria Westaway; Han-Kyu Lee; Jane Crawford
- Running time: 22 minutes
- Production companies: Cookie Jar Entertainment; Sunwoo Entertainment

Original release
- Network: Teletoon
- Release: October 3, 2010 – July 3, 2011

MetaJets is a South Korean-Canadian animated television series produced by Cookie Jar Entertainment and Sunwoo Entertainment.

== Production ==
Conceived by Peter M. Lenkov, Cookie Jar Entertainment received a development deal from Teletoon in 2006 to create a new series under the name Jet Force. The show was also known as Mach Force before being unveiled under its final title at MIPCOM 2008. MetaJets was produced by Cookie Jar in Canada and Sunwoo Entertainment in South Korea over a two year period. A Japanese partner was initially onboard, but left the project due to disagreements.

The 40-episode series had a production budget of ₩6.4 billion, with the city of Seoul investing in the project. Cookie Jar provided the script and audio work, while Sunwoo handled all aspects of the animation. Lenkov helped create the initial concept and structure of the series, while a team of roughly ten writers wrote the scripts. The series mixed traditional animation with elements of computer animation. Sunwoo initially estimated the show would need 300 shots per episode with roughly 80-100 requiring CG animation. After a storyboarded version of the first episode came back with over 200 shots requiring CG assets, Sunwoo decided to animate lesser seen mecha in 2D for budgetary and scheduling reasons.

The Korean version of the show features "Fly Away" by Kim Kyung-ho as its opening theme song. The credits song is "In Search of Freedom" by Hyoyeon Kim. The English version features music by Voodoo Highway.

== Broadcast ==
MetaJets first aired on KBS1 in South Korea between January 31 and November 7, 2009. It would also run on Daekyo Kids TV and Tooniverse. In English-speaking Canada, the series premiered between October 3, 2010 and July 3, 2011 on Teletoon, with reruns also on sister channel Cartoon Network. The show debuted in French-speaking Canada on Télétoon between November 7, 2010 and August 21, 2011.

In the United States, MetaJets premiered on Cartoon Network on July 4, 2010 with a ten episode marathon before being stripped daily at 6AM until the show's conclusion on August 13, 2010. This was reported to be the first time a predominantly Korean animated series aired on the channel. Reruns would later be broadcast on This TV's Cookie Jar Toons block. In the United Kingdom and Ireland, the series aired on Kix!. In South Africa, it ran on eToonz+. MetaJets premiered across Disney Channel Asia on June 28, 2009. Elsewhere, it premiered on TF1 on October 7, 2009 in France, Studio 23 on July 13, 2010 in the Philippines, and in 2011 it was shown on Clan in Spain.

The entire series was made available to watch on Netflix in the United States and other select territories from December 2010. In Canada it was offered from 2017–2018 via Kids Suite from Bell Satellite TV.

== Characters ==
Major characters:

=== Metajets ===
- Johnny Miller (강한결): Joined ARC tournament when George Strong invited him to be an ARC racer. During an unsanctioned race between Trey and Johnny at ground level slum, the match was interrupted by a Metajets summon. Johnny followed Trey's path into ARC-1 and discovered Trey, Maggie, Zak and George's Metajets connection. During Johnny's presence in ARC-1, An attack against ARC-1 was launched by General Raven. Johnny decided to leave ARC-1 and enter the battle. When Viper fired 2 missiles at Burner's jet, Johnny used his jet to take the hit for Burner. Following the battle, George recruited Johnny as Metajets agent.

Code Name : Ace (에이스)
15
Voice actor: Jamie Haydon-Devlin

- Trey Jordan (트레이): A Metajets agent and a champion ARC racer at the last season.

Code Name: Burner (버너)
16
Voice Actor: Mpho Koaho

- Maggie Strong (매기): An ARC racer, and George Strong's daughter.

Code Name: Foxtrot (폭스트롯)
15
Voice Actress: Katie Griffin

- Zachary Kim/Zak (잭): A top-10 ARC racer at the last season.

Code Name: Vector (벡터)
14
Voice Actor: Scott McCord

- Captain Strong (캡틴 스트롱)/George Strong: Commissioner of the ARC and Metajets leader.

41
Voice Actor: Ivan Sherry

- Major/First Officer: A Metajets officer at ARC-1.
- Technician: A Metajets officer at ARC-1.
- Jack Miller: Johnny Miller's father. Following the previous Black Clouds war 9 years ago, Jack Miller has gone missing afterwards.

Code Name: Ice Storm

=== Black Cloud ===
- General Raven (레이븐 장군): Originally a top ARC racer, he received a lifetime ban from racing after sabotaging a competitor near a fatal crash. As a Black Cloud leader, he attempts to take revenge against Captain Strong and the ARC. After failing to convince Fly-Girl and Crusher to manually detonate bombs at Soaring Heights following a delay on bomb timer set by Zak, Raven was persuaded by Viper to fight against Metajets at the front line. In a Soaring Height ground duel against Ace, Ace fired at an undetonated missile behind Raven, triggering an explosion that freezes Raven. Following the final ARC race of the season, the frozen Raven was seen in a jar maintained by Dr. Lucas.

Voice Actor: Steve Cumyn

- Fly Girl/Fly-Girl (플라이걸): A Black Cloud fighter jet pilot.

Voice Actress: Athena Karkanis

- Crusher (크러셔): A Black Cloud fighter jet pilot.

Voice Actor: David Berni

- Viper (바이퍼): A Black Cloud fighter jet pilot.

Voice Actor: Jonathan Koensgen

- BC Tech: An officer at Black Cloud Airship.

=== Aerial Racing Circuit (ARC) ===
- Announcer/Race Announcer: An announcer of ARC races.

Voice Actor: Ron Pardo

=== World Council ===
- World Council President: The head of the World Council. He has the authority to lock down Metajets weapon system remotely.

=== Others ===
- Tory
- Saul
- Kai
- Deb
- Doug Fontaine
- The Scarlet Circle
- The Red Baroness
- Tooler
- other men
- The AI
- Griffen Hawksmore
- Strong
- Dr. Lucas

== Vehicles ==
=== Metajets ===
- Ace's Metajet: Originally belong to Johnny's father, George assigned the jet to Johnny when Johnny became a Metajets agent. It includes a liquid nitrogen-based weapon system.
- Burner's Metajet: A jet with powerful laser cannons and afterburners.
- Foxtrot's Metajet: A jet armed with solar rockets.
- Vector's Metajet: A jet equipped with a sonic weapon.
- ARC-1: A flagship for the ARC that houses the race pilots and their jets, while secretly acting as the home base for Metajets.

=== Black Cloud ===
- Black Cloud Airship/Raven's Nest: A Black Cloud flagship.
- Crusher's Jet: A jet with wing-mounted buzzsaws.
- Flygirl's Jet: A jet armed with rapid-fire timed explosive darts.
- Viper's Jet: A jet with powerful homing missiles.
- Raven's Jet: General Raven's personal jet, not much is known about its capabilities as he only uses it twice in the series.
- Black Cloud Drone Jets: A massive swarm of drones that make up the bulk of Black Cloud's fleet.

== Merchandise ==
Sunwoo Entertainment designed the series with the intention of it being a Multi Source, Multi Use property. The company released a limited amount of toys in South Korea. Mattel was attached to distribute a toyline internationally, but none would make it to market.

Cookie Jar released a free downloadable game for Mac and Windows personal computers called MetaJets: Extreme Turbulence. Developed by Helios Interactive in conjunction with Reach Games, the title debuted in beta in early 2009 before officially launching in January 2010.
