= Maize (video game) =

2016 video game

- Producer: Finish Line Games
- Artist: slipknot
- Platforms: Windows, PlayStation 4, Xbox One
- Release: Windows, PlayStation 4; December 1, 2016; Xbox One; September 12, 2017
- Genre: Adventure game
- Mode: Single-player

Maize is a video game by Finish Line Games in Toronto. It was released on December 1, 2016.

== Gameplay ==
GameSpot says the game is an "absurdist" game based on Monty Python and X-Files humor. It tells the story of sentient corn created by government scientists who misinterpreted a memo.

During gameplay, players encounter talking objects and solve puzzles. It takes place at an abandoned farm, nearby an active underground research facility. The game also requires you to collect pieces of information.

== Release ==
Toronto-based studio Finish Line Games worked on it, after they had made Cel Damage HD. A trailer came out in May 2016. It later came out for PC in the fall. It was released on December 1, 2016.

== Plot ==
The player-character wakes up and sees three living cornstalks running away. Through various collectible items, such as an unusable English muffin, the player then unlocks a large facility door, and is warned by the speaking corn to "watch out for their brother".

As the player descends into the facility, they then learn through various notes that two brilliant yet bumbling scientists, Bob and Ted, were responsible for creating the facility and the living corn. The player then crafts a sentient Russian teddy bear, named "Vladdy", who constantly berates and insults the player. The player enters a ventilation system, and encounters two figures: The narcissistic hulking-yet-lisping albino corn scientist, the Cornacabra, and the Ruby Queen, the pink corn ruler of the other cornstalks. She then tasks the player with restoring power to the facility and raising the hooks outside on the surface. The player runs into the Cornacabra twice, during both scenarios he retreats.

The player accidentally breaks a gear needed to raise a hook, so they and Vladdy return to the surface and start a tractor, which accidentally runs over several of the cornstalks, who block off all paths out of anger. This is short-lived, however, as the player gains their trust again by playing the corn's favorite song on a boombox. The player and Vladdy fix the gear, and raise the hooks. The three cornstalks, Bill, Jim, and Fred, send a message to the player, asking them to free their queen.

The player, after accessing the control room, asks Vladdy to fix a vent, during which, the Cornacabra drags him away. Speaking over the intercoms, the Cornacabra tells the player that if they want Vladdy back, they'll have to come to the punishments room. The player complies, and finds that the "punishments room" is actually a dance-floor, filled with sentient scarecrows, who call the player "brother". The Cornacabra then reveals that the player is actually a scarecrow themselves, and the Ruby Queen arrives and scolds the Cornacabra for his insolence, and commands him to release the player, Vladdy, and the other scarecrows, informing the player that they are the corn's champion.

The player is then told by Vladdy that, though they are stupid, they are still comrades. The Ruby Queen then knights the player as their champion, and requests the cornstalks make preparations for their escape. Bill, Jim, and Fred however, accidentally call in an army drone strike after mistaking the communicator for a telephone. Vladdy suggests using the large lightning rod outside to destroy the drones first, and to lure them towards it by dancing. They successfully destroy the drones, though Vladdy dies in fixing the lightning rod.

The cornstalks then attempt to enter the silo, only to see the Cornacabra has taken control of an army drone, and plans to destroy the humans. The player throws the English muffin at the Cornacabra, discombobulating him and blowing both he and the drone up. The Ruby Queen asks the player to send them off, and thanks them for all their help. She gives the player a key, and asks them to send them on their way to the "promised land". After unlocking and pressing a launch button, the silo is then revealed to be a rocket, and the hooks were to bring the corn maze with the rocket. This however, is short-lived, due to Bill, Jim, and Fred forgetting to close the fuel hatch, causing the rocket to blow up, and turning the cornstalks into popcorn.

== Reception ==
Metacritic gave it a compiled score of 65/100 from 17 critics.

City Weekly liked the game and found it entertaining, but disliked the frame rate stalling.
