= William Ash (actor) =

British actor

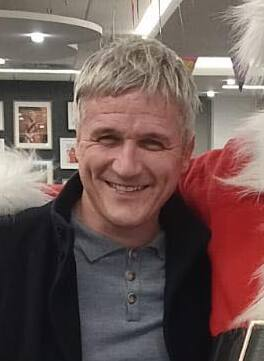
- Ash in 2025
- Born: 13 January 1977 (age 49); Chadderton, Oldham, England
- Other name: Will Ash
- Occupation: Actor
- Years active: 1987–present

William Ash (born 13 January 1977) is an English actor. He is known for roles in the television dramas Soldier Soldier (1993–1994), Where the Heart Is (1997–1998), Clocking Off (2001–2002), Waterloo Road (2009–2011), The Tunnel (2016–2017) and Emmerdale (2022–present). His film appearances include Mad About Mambo (2000) and Hush (2008).

== Career ==
Born in Chadderton, Oldham, Ash's first TV appearance was as Spike in Coronation Street aged 10. He then had a regular role as Nicky in Making Out (1989–1991), followed by a regular role in the ITV series Where the Heart Is. He has since appeared in Mad About Mambo, Clocking Off, Children's Ward, Lilies, Born to Run, Burn It, All the King's Men, ShakespeaRe-Told (A Midsummer Night's Dream), Doctor Who, the miniseries Conviction, Hush, Waterloo Road and Shameless. In 2006, he portrayed the Manchester United footballer Albert Scanlon in an edition of the BBC series Surviving Disasters about the Munich air disaster of 1958, of which Scanlon was a survivor.

Ash's stage credits include the premiere productions of Presence at the Royal Court Theatre in 2001 and of How to Disappear Completely and Never Be Found at Sheffield Theatres as well as Of Mice and Men at the Royal Lyceum Theatre in Edinburgh.

In December 2011, Ash had a starring role in a BBC comedy drama, Lapland, as Ray, a role he is reprising for a new series, Being Eileen. In 2013 he starred in the ITV comedy drama series Great Night Out as Beggsy. In 2015, Ash appeared as Frank Mellor in the BBC TV series Death in Paradise episode 4.4. In February 2016, he appeared in BBC drama series Moving On. In 2016, he appeared in the ITV/Netflix series Paranoid. He also appeared as the character BB in the second and third series of Sky Atlantic's The Tunnel. In 2017, Ash played Leighton Thomas in ITV's serial killer drama The Loch. In 2018, he played the role of Marvin in a British TV drama series, Wanderlust.

Ash played a central character in the 2020 film Perfect 10.

== Filmography ==
=== Film ===
Year	Film	Role	Notes
1987	The Sign of Four	Jack Smith	Television film
1993	Raining Stones	Joe	
1996	The Bare Necessities	Tony	Television film
1998	Anorak of Fire	Tim Bixton	Television film
1999	Fanny and Elvis	Rick	
1999	All the King's Men	Sergeant Ted Grimes	Television film
2000	Mad About Mambo	Danny Mitchell	
2002	Daddy's Girl	DC Neil Hallam	Television film
2002	Nicholas Nickleby	Frank Cheeryble	
2003	Standing Room Only	Simon	Short
2006	Magnolia	Ed	Television film
2007	Until Death	Serge	
2008	Hush	Zakes Abbot	
2011	Lapland	Ray Cooper	Television film
2013	The Last Witch	Howard Greenwood	Television film
2013	The Flea	Brooke/Essex	
2013	Man in the Moon	Joe	
2017	Habit	Ian	
2017	Sophie's Lights	Alan	Short
2018	Playing Dead	Liam	Short
2019	Perfect 10	Rob	
2019	The Invisible	Cal	

=== Television ===
Year	Title	Role	Notes
1987	How We Used to Live	Peter Hodgkins	Episode: "1957: Commercial Breaks"
1987	Coronation Street	Spike	1 episode
1988	Screen Two	Marlene's Kid	Episode: "Love Birds"
1989–1991	Children's Ward	Darren Walsh	Series regular
1989–1991	Making Out	Nicky	Series regular
1992	Heartbeat	Paul Allenby	Episode: "Nowt But a Prank"
1993–1994	Soldier Soldier	Jack Stubbs	7 episodes
1995	Heartbeat	Joe Norton	2 episodes
1996	Beck	Ralph	Series regular
1997	Born to Run	Sammy Fitch	1 episode
1997–1998	Where the Heart Is	Stephen Snow	Recurring role
2001	Dark Realm	Eric Phillips	Episode: "Organizer 2000"
2001–2002	Clocking Off	Nick Anderson	Series regular
2002	Coronation Street	Johnny James	1 episode
2002	Having It Off	David	Series regular
2003	Burn It	Jon Moore	Series regular
2004	Conviction	Chrissie Fairburn	Series regular
2005	Jericho	Johnny Swan	Episode: "The Killing of Johnny Swan"
2005	ShakespeaRe-Told	James	Episode: "A Midsummer's Night Dream"
2006	Surviving Disaster	Albert Scanlon	Episode: "Munich Air crash"
2007	Lilies	Nazzer	Episode: "The Sea"
2007	Doctor Who	Riley Vashtee	Episode: "42"
2007	Sold	Gavin	1 episode
2009–2011	Waterloo Road	Christopher Mead	Series regular
2011	Shameless	Jesus O'Toole	Episode: "Comebacks"
2011	Legacy: High Green Walls	Dan	
2011	Casualty	Harry Reynolds	Episode: "System Error"
2012	Life Stories	Davey	Episode: "Toby's Dad"
2013	Great Night Out	Matthew "Beggsy" Begg	Series regular
2013	Being Eileen	Ray Cooper	Series regular
2013	Scott & Bailey	Craig	1 episode
2014	Inspector George Gently	Mark Tanner	Episode: "Gently with Honour"
2014	Vera	Linus Campion	Episode: "The Deer Hunters"
2015	Father Brown	RSM Reginald Davis	Episode: "The Sign of the Broken Sword"
2015	Death in Paradise	Frank Mellor	Episode: "Until Death Do You Part"
2015	The Embrace	Charlie	
2016	Moving On	John	Episode: "Scratch"
2016	Paranoid	Henry Appley	Series regular
2016–2018	The Tunnel	Boleslaw 'BB' Borowski	Series regular
2017	The Loch	Leighton Thomas	Series regular
2018	Wanderlust	Marvin Walters	Recurring role
2020	Silent Witness	Major Mark Sealy	2 episodes
2020	The Accidental Medium	Frank	Series regular
2021	Casualty	Kevin Eccles	1 episode
2021	War of the Worlds	Mark	1 episode
2021	Wolfe	Jeff	2 episodes
2022	The Rising	Michael Wyatt	Series regular; 8 episodes
2022	The Window	John Maslin	Recurring role; 4 episodes
2022–present	Emmerdale	Caleb Miligan	Series regular
2023	Significant Other	Paul	Episode: "Episode 6"

=== Stage ===
Year	Title	Role	Venue	Notes
1999	Juno and the Paycock	Johnny Boyle	Donmar Warehouse, Covent Garden, London	
2001	Presence	Paul	Royal Court Theatre, Sloane Square, London	
2002	Port	Danny Miller	Royal Exchange Theatre, Manchester	
2003	The Sugar Syndrome	Lewis	Royal Court Theatre, Sloane Square, London	
2005	Electra	Restes	Royal Exchange Theatre, Manchester	
2007	Mary Barton	Jem Wilson	Royal Exchange Theatre, Manchester	
2007	How to Disappear Completely and Never Be Found	Charlie/Adam	Crucible Theatre, Sheffield	
2008–2009	You Can See the Hills	Adam	Royal Court Theatre, Sloane Square, London & Young Vic, The Cut, London	
2011	The Globe Mysteries	Jesus	Shakespeare's Globe, Southwark, London	
2012	Of Mice and Men	George Milton	Royal Lyceum Theatre, Edinburgh	
