= 11-11-11 (film) =

2011 American horror film

- Theatrical release poster
- Directed by: Darren Lynn Bousman
- Written by: Darren Lynn Bousman
- Produced by: Loris Curci; Christian Molina; Ferran Monje; Wayne Alan Rice
- Starring: Timothy Gibbs; Michael Landes; Wendy Glenn; Lolo Herrero
- Cinematography: Joseph White
- Edited by: Martin Hunter
- Music by: Joseph Bishara
- Production company: Capacity Pictures
- Distributed by: Epic Pictures Group; Rocket Releasing
- Release date: November 11, 2011
- Running time: 97 minutes
- Countries: United States; Spain
- Language: English
- Box office: $7 million

11-11-11 is a 2011 supernatural horror film written and directed by Darren Lynn Bousman. The film is set at 11:11 on the 11th day of the 11th month and concerns an entity from another world that enters the earthly realm through Heaven's 11th gate. The film was released in 17 theaters domestically on November 11, 2011. It was distributed by Epic Pictures Group in North America, though most of its revenues were generated from foreign showings.

== Plot ==
Joseph Crone wakes in his hotel room at 11:11 AM on November 7, 2011. His manager, Grant, arrives and urges Joseph to write his next novel after telling him that his previous book sold over 5 million copies. Joseph begins writing about how after his wife and son died, he lost all faith in a higher power and God and writes "God is dead, or maybe he was never alive."

On November 8, 2011, Joseph attends his support group meeting where Sadie is telling her story. Outside, Sadie tells Joseph that he should speak up, calling him good with words, and gives him a notebook. On departure, Joseph is immediately in a car accident. At the hospital, he has an MRI scan and the doctors reveal to him that he is perfectly healthy and uninjured while the other driver was killed in the crash. Joseph tells Sadie that he feels that he has no purpose and prays for God to kill him every day. He then examines his watch and sees that it stopped exactly at 11:11. That night, Joseph gets a call from his estranged brother, Samuel, who is living in Spain with their father, Richard, and learns their father is dying.

On November 9, 2011, Joseph goes to Barcelona, Spain, to visit his father. There, Joseph meets with Samuel, who uses a wheelchair. Samuel urges Joseph to put aside his hatred for the church and asks Joseph to stay the night. Later Samuel tells Joseph that his congregation dwindled away and asks him to try to get some of his fans to follow his church.

In Samuel's study, the local housekeeper Ana demands that Samuel show Joseph the video de los demonios. Ana shows Joseph a security video taken on November 3 that depicts the faint outline of what appears to be a demon at 11:11 PM. Joseph tells Samuel that he's been seeing the number 11-11 frequently in the past few days. Joseph later talks to Ana and finds a diary, only titled El Libro de Ana. Ana claims that it's the gospel according to her. That night, Joseph reads that people who frequently see the number 11-11 have been "Activated", and saves Samuel, who is being strangled by demon-like creatures.

On November 10, 2011, at a meeting of Samuel's congregation, a man named Javier brandishes a gun at Samuel, dropping a camera in the process. Joseph disarms Javier, who runs off. Joseph and Samuel then visit the cemetery where their mother, Lauren, is buried. Joseph points out that Samuel's birthday and Lauren's death both took place on November 11. Joseph tells Samuel that the attack the night before, Joseph's accident, David's death, and the apparitions all occurred at 11:11 on the clock. Samuel urges Joseph to not look for meaning where there is none. Joseph goes to find a shop to develop the photos on Javier's camera, and the employees say that the photos will be developed the next day. Joseph visits an occult bookstore where the keeper reads a passage from a book, detailing that on November 11, 2011, a sacrifice will be made that will "destroy faith and the Serpent will rise". Joseph becomes convinced that Samuel is a prophet to save the church and that on November 11, 2011, at 11:11, Samuel will be sacrificed by these demons for the devil to rise.

On November 11, 2011, Joseph finds that Sadie has arrived in Barcelona, and they are cornered in a maze by Javier, who brandishes the gun at Joseph before fleeing. When Joseph and Sadie return to the house, they find that Richard has died. Joseph breaks into Javier's home and finds Samuel's photos in a diary with the word SACRIFICIO scrawled on its pages, along with 11-11-11. Javier finds Joseph and shoots him.

Joseph comes to that night, calls Sadie, and tells her to get the photos that were developed as he runs back to the house. He finds Samuel, who urges Joseph to save the notebooks that chronicle the church's history. As they do, they're cornered by the demonic beings, who take Samuel at 11:02PM. Joseph attempts to find and rescue Samuel as Sadie gets the photos. Joseph finds Samuel, suspended in the air, surrounded by the beings. A sinkhole opens, causing Joseph to fall away from rescue, but he manages to crawl out of the sinkhole as one of the creatures readies a blade to stab Samuel. Joseph steps in the path of the blade exactly at 11:11, and the beings disappear.

Sadie, looking through the photos, burns them all. Joseph and Samuel lie out in the rain as Joseph begins to die. Samuel tells Joseph that 11-11 was not a window opening, but one closing, and that the end of the world could only be stopped then. Joseph finds the notebooks and reads one that Samuel wrote, depicting his own death. Samuel stands, collects the notebooks, and leaves Joseph to die after revealing that the beings were, in fact, angels and that he was the devil that needed to be stopped. A new religion will start, and Joseph's, Samuel's, Sadie's, Grant's, and Ana's books will become the new gospels.

Sometime later, a large church is filled with Samuel's followers, each bearing a book titled The Book of Joseph.

== Cast ==
- Timothy Gibbs as Joseph Crone
- Michael Landes as Samuel Crone
- Wendy Glenn as Sadie
- Denis Rafter as Richard Crone
- Lluís Soler as Javier
- Brendan Price as Grant
- Lolo Herrero as Oculto Owner
- Montserrat Alcoverro as Celia
- Benjamin Cook as David
- Salomé Jiménez as Sarah
- J. Larose as Wayne
- JC Gonzalez as Ryan
- Emilie Autumn as Woman In Video

== Reception ==
Review aggregator Rotten Tomatoes gives the film a 7% approval rating based on 14 reviews, with an average rating of 3.71/10. Metacritic reports a score of 26/100 based on 5 critics, indicating "generally unfavorable" reviews. The film was most popular in Brazil and Russia.

== See also ==
- The Number 23
- 2012
