= List of World War II science fiction, fantasy, and horror films =

Below is an incomplete list of science fiction, fantasy, and horror feature films or miniseries on the theme of World War II.

A separate list of TV series appears at the end.

== 1940s ==
Year	Country	Main title (Alternative titles)	Original title (Original script)	Director	Battles, campaigns, events depicted
1941	United States	King of the Zombies		Jean Yarbrough	Horror-comedy. Nazi doctor on island off US coast attempting to acquire war intelligence using zombies
1942	United States	Black Dragons		William Nigh	SF. Scientist turns Japanese spies into Americans
1942	United States	Spy Smasher (serial)		William Witney	
1942	United Kingdom	Thunder Rock		Roy Boulting	Fantasy/Drama. Outspoken anti-Fascist journalist in isolation of Lake Michigan lighthouse visited by immigrant spirits who encourage fight against Fascism
1943	United States	A Guy Named Joe		Victor Fleming	Fantasy. Spirit of dead pilot acts as "guardian angel" for new pilots
1943	United States	Revenge of the Zombies		Steve Sekely	Horror.
1943	United States	Tarzan Triumphs		Wilhelm Thiele	Adventure. German paratroopers conquer a lost city in Africa
1946	United Kingdom	A Matter of Life and Death (Stairway to Heaven)		Powell and Pressburger	Fantasy.

== 1960s ==
Year	Country	Main title (Alternative titles)	Original title (Original script)	Director	Battles, campaigns, events depicted
1964	United States	The Incredible Mr. Limpet		Arthur Lubin, Robert McKimson	Live-action/animated comedy. Man turns into talking fish and helps US Navy destroy U-boats, 1941
1966	United Kingdom	The Frozen Dead		Herbert J. Leder	SF horror. Scientist reanimates frozen heads of Nazi war criminals to revive Third Reich
1966	United States	Spy Smasher Returns (TV)		William Witney	Action-adventure. Superhero Alan Armstrong battles Nazi villains and saboteurs determined to spread destruction; edited TV version of 1942 serial Spy Smasher
1968	United States	They Saved Hitler's Brain (TV)		David Bradley	SF thriller. Nazis in South America kidnap scientist to maintain living head of Adolf Hitler in order to revive the Third Reich

== 1970s ==
Year	Country	Main title (Alternative titles)	Original title (Original script)	Director	Battles, campaigns, events depicted
1971	United States	Bedknobs and Broomsticks		Robert Stevenson	Children's fantasy musical. German raid on England repulsed with magic, 1940
1972	United States	Slaughterhouse-Five		George Roy Hill	SF based on the novel of the same name written by Kurt Vonnegut. Firebombing of Dresden, 1945
1975	Italy; France	Salò, or the 120 Days of Sodom	Salò o le 120 giornate di Sodoma	Pier Paolo Pasolini	Talks about four libertines that kidnap 18 teenagers and subject them to four months of extreme violence, sadism, and sexual and psychological torture during the last days of the Italian Social Republic.
1975	United States	Wonder Woman (The New Original Wonder Woman / The New Adventures of Wonder Woman) (TV)		Leonard Horn	Action-adventure. Pilot in dogfight with Nazi plane crash-lands in Bermuda Triangle on uncharted island inhabited by women
1977	United States	Shock Waves (Almost Human / Shockwaves)		Ken Wiederhorn	SF horror. Island-shipwrecked party encounters former SS commander leading zombie storm troopers
1977	Czechoslovakia	Tomorrow I'll Wake Up and Scald Myself with Tea	Zítra vstanu a opařím se čajem	Jindrich Polák	SF comedy. Time travel by aging former Nazis conspiring to alter results of war
1978	United States; United Kingdom	The Boys from Brazil		Franklin J. Schaffner	SF thriller based on Ira Levin novel. Nazi hunter discovers doctor's plot to revive Third Reich by cloning Hitler in Paraguayan jungle

== 1980s ==
Year	Country	Main title (Alternative titles)	Original title (Original script)	Director	Battles, campaigns, events depicted
1980	United Kingdom; Canada	Death Ship		Alvin Rakoff	Horror-Mystery. Nazi prison ship sails seas since end of war luring unsuspecting victims aboard
1980	United States	The Final Countdown (U.S.S. Nimitz: Lost in the Pacific)		Don Taylor	SF. Modern US nuclear aircraft carrier lost in storm arrives in South West Pacific Theatre on 7 December 1941
1981	France	Oasis of the Zombies (Bloodsucking Nazi Zombies / The Treasure of the Living Dead)	L'abîme des morts vivants	Jesus Franco	Horror. Treasure hunters seeking Nazi bullion, carried across Sahara Desert by Wehrmacht soldiers falling under Allied assault with only one survivor, encounter gold's zombie protectors
1981	France; Spain	Zombie Lake (The Lake of the Living Dead)	Le lac des morts vivants	Jean Rollin	Horror. Wehrmacht soldiers killed in lake by French Resistance during war are reanimated into zombies
1982	United States	Dead Men Don't Wear Plaid		Carl Reiner	Detective comedy. Nazis in Latin America with weaponized cheese mould
1984	United Kingdom	The Keep		Michael Mann	Action-horror. German Army and "Einsatzkommandos" occupy Romanian citadel with demonic forces
1984	United States	The Philadelphia Experiment		Stewart Raffill	Adventure-fantasy. Military experiment sends USN destroyer escort from Philadelphia Navy Yard, 1943, to 1984 Nevada desert town; prequel to 1993 film Philadelphia Experiment II
1985	United States	Zone Troopers		Danny Bilson	SF. Soldiers find alien craft
1986	Spain	In a Glass Cage	Tras el cristal	Agustí Villaronga	Horror.
1989	United States	Puppetmaster (Puppet Master I)		David Schmoeller	SF horror. Nazi mission to capture US puppeteer with "secret to life" ate explored by modern scientists

== 1990s ==
Year	Country	Main title (Alternative titles)	Original title (Original script)	Director	Battles, campaigns, events depicted
1991	United States	Puppet Master III: Toulon's Revenge		David DeCoteau	Horror-thriller. Puppeteer avenging his wife killed by Nazis bent on developing drug that reanimates dead
1991	United States	The Rocketeer		Joe Johnston	Action-adventure. Young pilot discovers Howard Hughes' jetpack prototype and as flying superhero battles Nazis before US entry into war
1993	Estonia; Poland; Russia	Tear of the Prince of Darkness (Satan's Tear)	Saatana pisar (in Estonian); Łza księcia ciemności (in Polish); Слеза князя тьмы (in Russian)	Marek Piestrak	Horror. NKVD actions in Estonia and Poland, 1939
1993	United States	Philadelphia Experiment II		Stephen Cornwell	Adventure-fantasy. Military experiment sends ex-WWII sailor to alternative "1993" where Germany has won war before arriving in Nazi Germany along with modern stealth bomber, 1943; sequel to 1984 film The Philadelphia Experiment
1998	United States	Apt Pupil		Bryan Singer	Horror based on Stephen King novella.
1999	United States	The Devil's Arithmetic (TV)		Donna Deitch	Fantasy/Drama. Modern teenage girl projected into 1940's death camp prisoner to experience horrors firsthand

== 2000s ==
Year	Country	Main title (Alternative titles)	Original title (Original script)	Director	Battles, campaigns, events depicted
2001	United Kingdom	The Bunker		Rob Green	In 1944, in the Belgian - German border, seven German soldiers survive an American attack in the front and lock themselves in a bunker. Under siege by the enemy and with little ammunition, they decide to explore tunnels to seek supplies and find an escape route. While in the tunnel, weird things happen to the group.
2002	United States	Below		David Twohy	Strange happenings occur on a United States WW II submarine after picking up three survivors from a sunken British hospital ship.
2002	United States; Canada; Australia	Return to Never Land		Robin Budd, Donovan Cook	Animated family adventure based on J.M. Barrie book. Peter Pan rescues young girl from Captain Hook in Never Land during Battle of Britain, 1940; sequel to the 1953 film Peter Pan
2003	Cuba; Spain	More Vampires in Havana	Más Vampiros en la Habana	Juan Padrón	Sequel to the 1985 cuban animated film called Vampires in Havana talks about a Nazi scientist creating an army of Nazi vampires who cause trouble in the city of Havana, Cuba.
2004	United States	Hellboy		Guillermo del Toro	Infant demon summoned from Hell to Earth by Nazi occultists discovered by Allied Forces
2005	Singapore; Japan	1942	1942 怨霊	Kelvin Tong	Action, Horror, War. Japanese Sixth Army and war photographer in Malayan jungle
2005	Japan	Lorelei: The Witch of the Pacific Ocean	Rōrerai (ローレライ)	Shinji Higuchi, Cellin Gluck	Experimental Japanese submarine attempts to prevent atomic bombing of Tokyo
2006	Sweden	Frostbite	Frostbiten	Anders Banke	Horror comedy. Former SS geneticist attempting to create master breed of vampires in Norrland
2006	United Kingdom	Ghostboat (TV)		Stuart Orme	Mystery-thriller based on Neal R. Burger novel. Fictional RN submarine presumed lost in Baltic in 1943 resurfaces near end of Cold War, 1981
2006	United States	Horrors of War (Zombies of War)		Peter John Ross, John Whitney	Action-horror. OSS conducts missions to discover source of Hitler's wunderwaffen and vergeltungswaffen terrorizing Allies
2006	Spain; Mexico	Pan's Labyrinth	El laberinto del fauno	Guillermo del Toro	Fantasy/Drama. Parable influenced by fairy tale of young girl's escape into abandoned labyrinth with mysterious faun creature in Francoist Spain, May–June 1944
2006	Canada	War of the Dead		Sean Cisterna	Horror. Special agent investigating deaths of WWII veterans being hunted down by Nazi zombies
2006	United States	SS Doomtrooper		David Flores	Action Sci-Fi. A genetically bred Nazi super soldier fights Allied troops.
2007	United States	Reign of the Gargoyles (TV)		Ayton Davis	Action-horror. An American aircrew join forces with British soldiers and local townsfolk to battle living gargoyles and the German army
2008	United States	Blitzkrieg: Escape from Stalag 69		Keith J. Crocker	Horror drama. Captured USO showgirls and Allied POWs under sadistic SS Stalag commandant
2008	United Kingdom	Outpost		Steve Barker	Action-horror. Mercenaries on Eastern European mission battling mysterious Nazi evil in old Nazi bunker
2008	United States	WarBirds (TV)		Kevin Gendreau	American air crew in Pacific Theatre meet pterosaurs
2009	Norway	Dead Snow	Død snø	Tommy Wirkola	Horror-comedy. SS troops killed in Norway reanimate into zombies terrorizing a modern-day wilderness vacation
2009	Russia; Japan; Canada	First Squad	Pervyy otryad (Первый отряд) (in Russian); Fāsuto sukuwaddo ファースト・スクワッド (in Japanese)	Yoshiharu Ashino	Anime. Set during the Eastern Front, featuring Soviet teenagers with extraordinary abilities that are opposed by a supernatural army of crusaders
2009	United States	The Land That Time Forgot		C. Thomas Howell	SF based on Edgar Rice Burroughs novel. Stranded U-boat crew in time void on island inside Bermuda Triangle; loosely made re-make of similarly titled 1975 film
2009	United States	Blood Creek (Town Creek)		Joel Schumacher	Horror-thriller. Brothers on revenge mission in rural West Virginia where Nazi professor has been waging occult war since 1936

== 2010s ==
Year	Country	Main title (Alternative titles)	Original title (Original script)	Director	Battles, campaigns, events depicted
2010	United States; Canada; Germany	Bloodrayne: The Third Reich		Uwe Boll	Fantasy-thriller. Dhamphir battling vampire Nazi officer bent on making Hitler immortal
2010	United Kingdom	Jackboots on Whitehall		Edward McHenry, Rory McHenry	Animatronic satire. Alternative history of war where Nazi Germany occupies London
2010	United Kingdom	Nanny McPhee and the Big Bang (Nanny McPhee Returns)		Susanna White	Comedy fantasy. Operation Pied Piper and governess who uses magic to aid farm family in need of assistance
2010	United States; Canada; Germany	Puppet Master: Axis of Evil		David DeCoteau	Horror-SF. Young man dreaming of joining war effort finds dead puppeteer's crate of mysterious puppets before battling Axis agents on homefront
2010	United Kingdom	The Chronicles of Narnia: The Voyage of the Dawn Treader		Michael Apted	Fantasy-adventure based on C. S. Lewis novel. Children travel from wartime England to the magical land of Narnia
2011	United States; Canada; Germany	Blubberella		Uwe Boll	Action-Comedy. Dhamphir battling Nazis bent on eliminating Resistance group on Eastern Front; spoof of BloodRayne: The Third Reich
2011	United States	Captain America: The First Avenger		Joe Johnston	Based upon the Marvel comic book of Captain America, American soldier transformed into super soldier aids war effort against Hitler's head of advanced weaponry
2011	New Zealand	The Devil's Rock		Paul Campion	Action-horror. A New Zealand commando on the Channel Islands discovers a Nazi occult plot to win the war
2011	United States; Lithuania; Italy	War of the Dead		Marko Mäkilaakso	Action-horror. Medical experiments performed on captured Russian soldiers by Gestapo officer who are later encountered by platoon of American and Finnish soldiers, 1939/41
2012	Finland; Germany; Australia	Iron Sky		Timo Vuorensola	Nazis attack Earth from Moon base
2012	United States	Nazis at the Center of the Earth (V)		Joseph J. Lawson	A direct-to-video sci-fi film produced by The Asylum
2012	United Kingdom	Outpost: Black Sun		Steve Barker	Action horror. Scientist develops technology to create immortal Nazi zombie army near end of war to prevent rise of 4th Reich; sequel to 2008 film Outpost
2013	Netherlands; United States; Czech Republic	Frankenstein's Army	Army of Frankenstein	Richard Raaphorst	Action, Horror, Sci-fi. Russian soldiers find secret Nazi lab in eastern Germany
2013	United Kingdom	Outpost: Rise of the Spetsnaz	Outpost 3	Kieran Parker	Action horror. Russian soldiers find themselves facing not only zombie soldiers but also the threat of becoming part of the zombie army too; sequel to 2012 film Outpost: Black Sun
2015	India	Detective Byomkesh Bakshy!		Dibakar Banerjee	Based upon the novel Satyanweshi by the Bengali writer Sharadindu Bandyopadhyay. The film, set in the war-torn Calcutta of the 1940s, follows the first adventure of detective Byomkesh, fresh out of college, as he pits himself against an evil genius who is out to destroy the world.
2017	United States	Transformers 5		Michael Bay	Science fiction; Relevant to the plot of the long history of Transformers, Bumblebee, who now transforms into a Mercedes-Benz 770 instead of a Chevy Camaro, is allied with the Devil's Brigade unit and helps them besiege Nazi territory with his war hammer.
2018	United States	Overlord		Julius Avery	Thriller, Horror; During D-Day, American paratroopers stumble upon a strange Nazi experiment in a French village.
2018	Poland; Germany; Netherlands	Werewolf	Wilkołak	Adrian Panek	A horror film set in the immediate aftermath of World War II in a temporary orphanage for children liberated from a concentration camp.
2019	United States	Hellboy		Neil Marshall	Thriller, Horror; Lobster Johnson crashes a Nazi ritual during the war in a flashback sequence.

== 2020s ==
Year	Country	Main title (Alternative titles)	Original title (Original script)	Director	Battles, campaigns, events depicted
2020	United Kingdom; Bulgaria	Ghosts of War		Eric Bress	horror - five American soldiers are ordered to hold a French castle formerly occupied by the Nazi high command and encounters virtual ghosts
2020	United States; New Zealand	Shadow in the Cloud		Roseanne Liang	Action-horror. A woman on a top-secret mission joins an all-male crew on a flight from New Zealand to Samoa in 1943 during the Pacific War.
2023	Japan	The Boy and the Heron	Kimitachi wa Dō Ikiru ka (君たちはどう生きるか)	Hayao Miyazaki	Animated fantasy drama animated by Studio Ghibli. Depicts trauma recovery of a Japanese civilian child after losing mother in a Pacific War bombing.
2023	United States	Indiana Jones and the Dial of Destiny		James Mangold	Action-adventure. Indiana Jones battles Nazi scientists in both 1944 and 1969.
2024	Russia	The Dugout	Блиндаж	Mark Gorobets	History, Sci-Fi, War.

== Dramatized documentary ==
Year	Country	Main title (Alternative titles)	Original title (Original script)	Director	Battles, campaigns, events depicted
2008	Russia; United States	Philosophy of a Knife (V)		Andrey Iskanov	Horror. Unit 731 and Japanese human experimentation

== See also ==
- List of World War II films
- List of science fiction films
- List of fantasy films
- List of horror films
