= Gifted (British TV series) =

- Genre: Teen drama
- Created by: Emma Reeves
- Based on: Gifted by Marilyn Kaye
- Directed by: Matthias Hoene; Steve Barker
- Theme music composer: Anne-Sophie Versnaeyen
- Country of origin: United Kingdom (Scotland)
- Original language: English
- No. of series: 1
- No. of episodes: 10

Production
- Executive producer: Arabella Page Croft
- Running time: 27-28 minutes
- Production company: Black Camel Pictures

Original release
- Network: CBBC
- Release: 24 November 2025

Gifted is a British teen drama television series created by Emma Reeves and adapted from the book series of the same name by Marilyn Kaye. The series premiered on 24 November 2025 on CBBC.

== Premise ==
Set in Edinburgh, the series is about a group of Scottish teens who discover they have unique superpowers and must band together to fight a powerful organisation that is targeting them.

== Cast ==
- Charlie Geany as Ken
- Jessica Hardwick as Madame
- Claire Charlotte Cassidy as Emily
- Alexander Tait as Jack
- Oliver Martindale as Iain
- Eva MacCallumm as Amanda
- Mandipa Kabanda as Tracey
- Elena Hui Ling Yap as Jenna
- Cara McFarlane as Nina
- Dominic McLaughlin as Martin
- Adam Sinclair as Angus
- Nim McQuin as Margery
- Nairn Archer as Artair
- Sanjeev Kohli as Mr. Jackson
- Paul McCole as Mr. Tempest
- Leah MacRae as Shopkeeper
- Larry Dean as Gameshow Host

== Production ==
Gifted is an international co-production between Black Camel Pictures and Paris-based French producer Media Valley. The series is adapted from the popular series of books Gifted by Marilyn Kaye. The lead writer is Emma Reeves and is directed by Matthias Hoene and Steve Barker. Other writers on the series include Laurence Clark and Joseph Lidster.

== Broadcast ==
The series was broadcast from 24 November 2025 on BBC, along with the boxset on BBC iPlayer.
