= Theo Green =

- Green in 2019

Background information
- Born: Oxford
- Occupations: Composer; director; sound designer
- Instruments: Piano; keyboards; synthesizer; guitar
- Website: Official Website

Theo Green is an ASCAP Award-winning British composer and Oscar winning sound designer. He is known for his music for The Gambler, House at the End of the Street, his Academy Award nominated sound design for Blade Runner 2049 and his Academy Award winning sound design for Dune.

== Early life ==
Green was in the New College Choir as a chorister of New College School in Oxford and later studied at Abingdon School and the Courtauld Institute of Art, London.

== Film and TV ==
In 2026, Green wrote and directed a debut feature, "Inner Voice", featuring Alma Prelec, Barnaby Tobias and Kyshan Wilson.

Theo Green’s work on Denis Villeneuve’s Dune won an Oscar for his sound design, and signaled the reunion of Theo Green and Hans Zimmer, who worked together on Blade Runner 2049. Zimmer worked very closely with Green on Dune with Green's composition "Tooth of Shai Hulud" providing the score for early scenes on Arrakis. In 2017, Green was the Sound Designer for Denis Villeneuve's film Blade Runner 2049 and composed additional musical cues.

In 2014 Green teamed up with director Rupert Wyatt for a third time with Paramount Pictures' The Gambler, starring Mark Wahlberg, John Goodman, Brie Larson and Jessica Lange. Theo Green composed original music for the film.

In 2009 Theo Green wrote the score for Warp Films' thriller Hush, directed by Mark Tonderai. In 2012 he teamed up with Mark Tonderai a second time for the Jennifer Lawrence-starring suspense thriller, House at the End of the Street, creating a score that was awarded the ASCAP PRS Film Award. The film occupied the top position at the US Box Office on its opening weekend, going on to make over $45m from a budget under $7m. Since then, Green has composed the scores for Kidulthood director Menhaj Huda's Comedown, Steve Barker's follow up to his film "Outpost" - Outpost: Black Sun and Shan Khan's Honour starring Paddy Considine.

2008's BAFTA and BIFA-winning The Escapist was Green's first feature, as sound designer and additional composer, having collaborated with director Rupert Wyatt previously on the short film, "Get The Picture".

== Awards and nominations ==
In 2022 Theo Green won an Academy Award for Best Sound and a BAFTA for Dune. In 2018 he was nominated for an Academy Award for Best Sound Editing, as Sound Designer for Blade Runner 2049 and a BAFTA for Best Sound, Blade Runner 2049, and won the MPSE Golden Reel Award

Green's score for House at the End of the Street was awarded the ASCAP PRS Film Award in 2013.

== Film credits ==
=== As writer-director ===
- Inner Voice (2026)

=== As sound designer ===
- Dune (2021)
- Blade Runner 2049 (2017)
- The Escapist (2008)

=== As composer ===
- The Gambler (2014)
- Honour (2013)
- House at the End of the Street (2012)
- Comedown (2012)
- Lemon (2011)
- Outpost: Black Sun (2011)
- Blue Moon Rising (2010)
- Prowl (2010)
- Dread (2009)
- Hush (2009)
- Get the Picture (2004, short)
