= Johnny Meres =

English actor and writer (born 1958)

- Born: Jonathan Meres; 1958 (age 67–68); Nottingham, Nottinghamshire, England, U.K.
- Occupations: Actor, novelist
- Years active: 1993 – present
- Website: jonathanmeres.co.uk

Jonathan "Johnny" Meres (born in 1958) is an English actor and writer of children and teen novels.

== Career ==
Meres joined the merchant navy after leaving school.

Meres performed stand-up comedy from 1984 to 1994 under the stage name "Johnny Immaterial". He had a series on Radio He was nominated for a Perrier Award in 1993 for his show "My Booze Hell by Little Johnny Cartilage". He stopped performing stand-up in 1994.

== Awards ==
- Scottish Children's Book Award for his book May Contain Nuts (by Jonathan Meres)
- Phoenix Book Award 2013
- Perrier Comedy Award nominee 1993
- Time Out Award winner 1989

== Filmography ==
Year	Film	Role	Other notes
2000	The Little Vampire	Teacher	
2008	Outpost	Gotz	credited "The Breather"
2008	Stone of Destiny	Detective	
2012	Outpost: Black Sun	Gotz	
2015	Outpost: Rise of the Spetsnaz	Gotz	

== Books by Meres ==
- World of Norm 11 – May Be Recycled (2016)
- World of Norm 10 – Includes Delivery (2016)
- World of Norm 09 – May Still Be Charged (2015)
- World of Norm 08 – May Contain Buts (2015)
- World of Norm 07 – Must Be Washed Separately (2014)
- World of Norm 06 – May Need Rebooting (2014)
- World of Norm 05 – May Be Contagious (2013)
- World of Norm 04 – May Require Batteries (June 2013)
- World of Norm 03 – May Produce Gas (2012)
- World of Norm 02 – May Cause Irritation (2012)
- World of Norm 01 – May Contain Nuts (2011) Winner of the Scottish Children's Book Award 2012
- The World of Norm (Activity Book) – May Need Filling In (2014)
- Phenomenal! – The Small Book of Big Words (2012)
- Koala Calamity (2012)
- The XMAS Factor (2012)
- Our City (2008)
- On The Money (2007)
- Diary of a Trainee Rock God (2006)
- Fame Thing (2006)
- Love Dad (2004)
- Yo! Dot UK (2001)
- Clone Zone (2001)
- The Big Bad Rumour (2000)
- Yo! Diary! 2 – And Another Thing (2000)
- Yo! Diary! (1999)
- Somewhere Out There (1998)
