= Black camel =

Black camel or Black Camel may refer to:

- The Black Camel, 1929 novel, the fourth of the Charlie Chan novels by Earl Derr Biggers
- The Black Camel (film), a 1931 mystery film based on the book
- Zum Schwarzen Kameel ("The Black Camel," lit. "At [the Sign of] the Black Camel"), a Viennese restaurant founded in 1618
- Black Camel Pictures, a production company based in Glasgow
