= James Seymour Brett =

British composer and conductor

Background information
- Origin: London, England
- Genre: Film scores
- Occupation: Composer
- Years active: 1997–present
- Website: jamesseymourbrett.com

James Seymour Brett is an English composer and conductor.

== Early career ==
After graduating from the Royal Academy of Music in 1997, Brett was immediately hired by composer Michael Kamen. Brett's further contribution to film scores includes writing collaborations with Kamen on features such as The Event Horizon, What Dreams May Come, The Iron Giant, Frequency, X-Men, and the mini series, Band of Brothers produced by Steven Spielberg. In this period Brett also co-produced and provided additional score on Paramount's Against the Ropes.

In 1999 Brett helped produce the concert that saw Metallica pair up with The San Francisco Symphony Orchestra as assistant musical director. The album has since sold over five million copies worldwide. In 2002 Brett went on to plan and execute, again as assistant musical director and in close partnership with the BBC, Party at the Palace (part of the Queen's Golden Jubilee Celebrations). This event was broadcast live to a multi-million audience worldwide with a gold CD in less than a week. Brett co-ordinated and arranged many of the collaborations both with traditional rock pairings and new orchestral interpretations.

== Film and television ==
Brett has written extensively for film and television, including scores for TriStar Picture's Planet 51 and the 13-part NBC primetime series, Crusoe. Brett's collaborative work as composer, conductor and orchestrator with Harald Kloser can be heard in the feature film 2012 and the thriller Anonymous (film) directed by Roland Emmerich. Brett became a part of the creative team behind the film 10,000 BC. Brett also scored the music for the horror feature Outpost, directed by Steve Barker. In addition, Brett has written, orchestrated and conducted for the 2007 releases of Transformers for DreamWorks and The Nanny Diaries for The Weinstein Company.

In May 2013, Brett once again collaborated with Roland Emmerich on his major film White House Down. Brett also spent the summer working on One Chance (The Weinstein Company) working closely with Paul Potts and James Corden producing their vocal performances and arranging the material. Brett also composed the score to Stephen Frears film Lay the Favorite.

== Walking With Dinosaurs - The Live Experience ==
Brett travelled to Australia to collaborate on Walking with Dinosaurs: The Arena Spectacular. Working with the Sydney Symphony Orchestra he composed and conducted over 80 minutes of music to score the live arena show. The show features 20 life-size, animatronic dinosaurs, as they battle through evolution. It has recently finished a worldwide tour seen by over eight million people in 217 cities having won numerous awards since its opening in 2007.

== Disney - Imagination Parks ==
To mark the global relaunch of Disney Stores, Brett was asked to write music designed to thrill both children and parents alike. The "Imagination Parks" introduced new interactive zones, live events and mini theatres, which opened officially in Madrid on 6 July 2011.

== Batman Live ==
Brett's music can again be heard in arenas across the world in the stage show Batman Live. The score to accompany the DC superhero incorporates full symphonic forces, including choir. The show premiered in Manchester, UK in July 2011 and toured North America in 2012.

== Queen's Diamond Jubilee/Party in the Palace ==
Working with the BBC and Gary Barlow in 2012, Brett composed and conducted the Diamond Jubilee of Elizabeth II, celebrating the 60-year reign of the Queen alongside Paul McCartney, Annie Lennox and Stevie Wonder. Brett's Diamond Jubilee collaboration followed on from the 2002 BBC 'Party in the Palace', where he served as assistant musical director as part of the Queen's Golden Jubilee celebrations.

== Credits ==
=== Film and television ===
Year	Title	Director	Studio(s)	Notes
2020	Waiting for Anya	Ben Cookson	Goldfinch	Composer
2018	Here Comes the Grump	Andrés Couturier	Ánima Estudios	Composer
2018	The Guernsey Literary and Potato Peel Pie Society	Mike Newell (director)	Studio Canal	Musical director and additional music
2017	Eat Locals	Jason Flemyng	Evolution Pictures	Composer
2017	Alien: Covenant	Ridley Scott	20th Century Fox	Orchestrator and additional music
2016	The Promise	Terry George	Survival Pictures	Musical Director and Additional Music
2016	Independence Day 2: Resurgence	Roland Emmerich	20th Century Fox	Orchestrator
2015	Sweat	David Allain	Saetre Films	Composer
2015	In the Heart of the Sea	Ron Howard	Warner Bros.	Conductor and Score Arranger
2014	August: Osage County	John Wells	The Weinstein Company	Additional Music
2013	White House Down	Roland Emmerich	Columbia Pictures	Conductor and Orchestrator
2013	One Chance	David Frankel	The Weinstein Company	Musical Director and Operatic Music Arranger
2012	Lay the Favorite	Stephen Frears	Emmett/Furla Films	Composer
2012	L'Historie De Nos Petites Mort	David Chidlow	Campfire Stories	Composer
2011	Anonymous	Roland Emmerich	Studio Babelsberg	Conductor and Orchestrator
2009	2012	Roland Emmerich	Columbia Pictures	Conductor and Orchestrator
2009	Planet 51	Jorge Blanco	Sony Pictures	Composer
2008	Crusoe	Prods. Marc Van Buuren & Justin Bodle	NBC	Composer
2008	Outpost	Steve Barker	Matador Pictures	Composer
2008	10,000 BC	Roland Emmerich	Warner Bros.	Conductor and Orchestrator
2007	The Golden Compass	Chris Weitz	Warner Bros.	Music Arranger: End Credits - "LYRA" Performed by Kate Bush
2007	Transformers	Michael Bay	DreamWorks	Choir Conductor
2007	The Nanny Diaries	Shari Springer Berman / Robert Pulcini	The Weinstein Company	Orchestrator and Additional Music
2006	Die Stormflut	Jorgo Papavassiliou	teamWorx Produktion	Orchestrator
2005	Don't Just Dream It	Prod. Ben Rigden	Prospect Pictures	Composer
2005	Mrs. Harris	Phyllis Nagy	Number 9 Films	Orchestrator
2005	The Island	Michael Bay	DreamWorks	Additional Programmer
2005	Woman on the Beach	Catherine McCormack	Woman on the Beach Ltd.	Composer
2004	Alien vs. Predator	Paul W. S. Anderson	20th Century Fox	Conductor, Orchestrator and Additional Music
2004	Gladiatress	Brian Grant (director)	Icon Entertainment	Conductor and Orchestrator
2004	Ella Enchanted	Tommy O'Haver	Miramax	Conductor, Orchestrator/ Arranger and Additional Music
2004	The Life and Death of Peter Sellers	Stephen Hopkins (director)	Labrador Films	Arranger
2004	Hex: Seasons 1 & 2	Brian Grant (director)	Sky One	Composer
2004	Daniel and the Superdogs	André Melançon	Zephyr Films	Composer
2003	TR American Lion	David de Vries	Greystone TV	Composer

=== Concerts/Arena Shows ===
Year	Title	Studio(s)	Credit	Notes
2018	Fast and Furious Live	Universal Pictures	Composer	Currently touring
2016	Disneyland Tokyo: Frozen Forever	Disney	Composer, Arranger and Orchestrator	N/A
2014	Frozen: Holiday Wish	Disney	Composer, Arranger and Orchestrator	N/A
2012	Queen's Diamond Jubilee Celebrations	BBC	Conductor, Arranger and Orchestrator	Concert at Buckingham Palace
2010	Batman Live	Warner Bros DC Comics	Composer	Arena Tour 2010-2013
2010	Disney Stores - Imagination Parks	Disney	Composer and conductor	First store opened in Madrid, followed by a worldwide launch.
2007	Walking with Dinosaurs - The Arena Spectacular	BBC	Composer	Currently touring
2002	Party at the Palace	BBC	Assistant musical director	Live concert in Buckingham Palace Gardens. Arranger and coordinator of Music Live beacons event
2002	2002 Winter Olympics opening ceremony	NBC	Co-producer, assistant musical director	Live event and album
2001	EMI 'When Love Speaks' RADA Benefit Album	EMI	Co-producer, assistant musical director	Live concert launch and album
1999	Metallica S&M (album)	Metallica	Assistant musical director	San Francisco, Berlin, New York

=== Commercials ===
- Flora - Voyage
- Virgin Trains West Coast – Falling in Love
- Stella Artois - Circus
- Virgin Atlantic – Kitty Hawk
- Vodafone – Work and Play
- Vodafone – Speech Bubbles
