= Gareth Morrison =

Scottish actor, screenwriter and film producer

- Born: December 6, 1981 (age 44); Edinburgh, Scotland
- Education: Perth High School
- Occupations: Actor, producer, screenwriter
- Years active: 2003 — present
- Known for: Potrovsky, Outpost: Rise of the Spetsnaz (2013); Peter Sutcliffe, Killers (theatre) (2013); Sonny, Bed and Breakfast (2016)

Gareth Morrison (born 6 December 1981) is a Scottish actor, screenwriter and film producer. Morrison appears primarily in horror, thriller and dramatic movies. He is known for his role as a student-demonstrator in TV series Taggart and for playing the sniper Potrovsky in a horror movie Outpost: Rise of the Spetsnaz.

== Biography ==
Morrison was born in the Scottish city of Edinburgh.

Early in his career, Morrison played a minor role in episode "Cause to Kill" in the TV series Taggart in 2005. Morrison again linked up with Taggart creator Glenn Chandler eight years later, playing Peter Sutcliffe in Chandler's controversial stage play, Killers.

More recently, Morrison co-wrote and starred in the horror short Bed and Breakfast, which earned positive reviews including praise as "polished" and "enjoyable" by WeAreIndieHorror.com. His dramatic skills were also utilized in Harder, an educational film used in a Medics Against Violence and the Scottish Government joint program to help professionals recognize signs of domestic abuse.

Throughout his career, Morrison has acted in more than 18 movies.

=== Education ===
- Perth High School

== Filmography ==
=== As an actor ===
| Year | Title | Role | Notes |
|---|---|---|---|
| 2005 | Taggart | Student protester | |
| 2012 | Outpost: Black Sun | Nazi zombie | |
| 2013 | Crash | Policeman | |
| 2013 | Outpost: Rise of the Spetsnaz | Potrovsky, Red Army sniper | |
| 2014 | Skeletons | Tom | |
| 2014 | Night Kaleidoscope | Tommy | |
| 2015 | Time Teens: The Beginning | Quint | |
| 2015 | Swung | Leatherman | |
| 2015 | The Daniel Connection | Lubert | |
| 2015 | Exodus 21:24 | Ben | |
| 2016 | Tommy's Honour | The Local | |
| 2016 | Bed and Breakfast | Sonny | |
| 2017 | The Clan MacLeod | Tidal | |
| 2017 | Night Kaleidoscope | Fion's Dad | |

2018 "Tran Set " Keith

=== As producer ===
| Year | Title | Credit | Notes |
|---|---|---|---|
| 2014 | Skeletons | Associate producer | |

== See also ==
- Gareth Morris – British flautist
- Garth Morrison – Chief Scout
