= Vladimir Furdik =

Slovak actor and stuntman

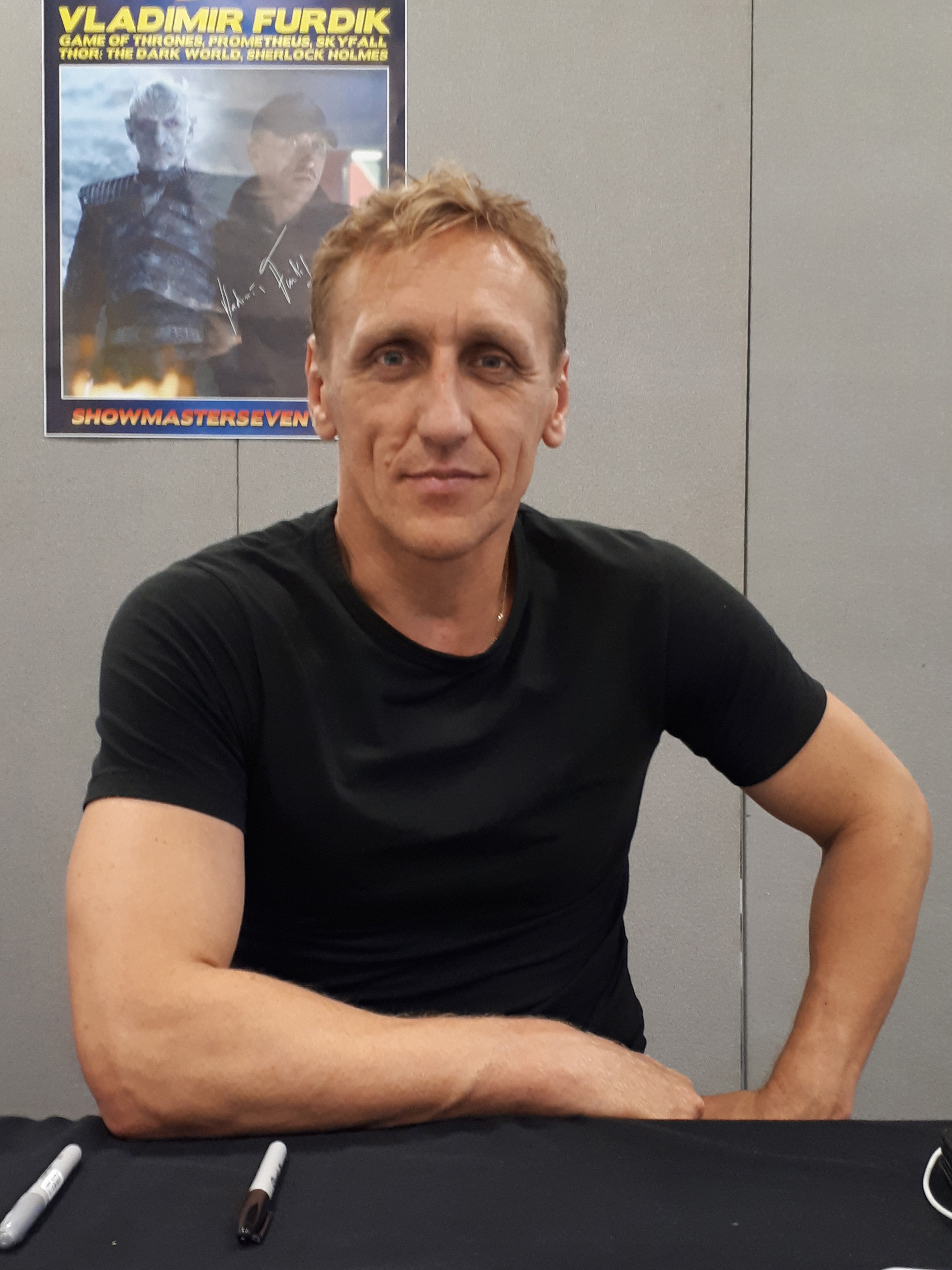
- Furdik in 2018
- Born: Bratislava, Czechoslovakia
- Occupations: Stuntman; Actor
- Years active: 1980s–present
- Works: Game of Thrones; The Witcher

Vladimir Furdik is a Slovak stunt performer and actor. He played the role of the Night King on the television series Game of Thrones from 2016 to 2019.

== Biography ==
Vladimir Furdik was born in Bratislava, Czechoslovakia (now Slovakia).

Since the 1970s, he was a member of theater groups in Czechoslovakia.

In the 1990s Furdik has already worked in Hollywood, first doing stunts for the low-budget horror film Tremors, but soon worked on The Three Musketeers.

Furdik moved from the predominantly stunt work to direct acting in the 2000s. He played the role of Andrzej, a gypsy in the film Sherlock Holmes: A Game of Shadows.

=== Game of Thrones ===
Furdik participated in the production of Game of Thrones, following the crew to Belfast, Spain, and Croatia. For the series, he not only did stunt work, but also portrayed the antagonist the Night King in Seasons 6, 7 and 8.

== Filmography ==
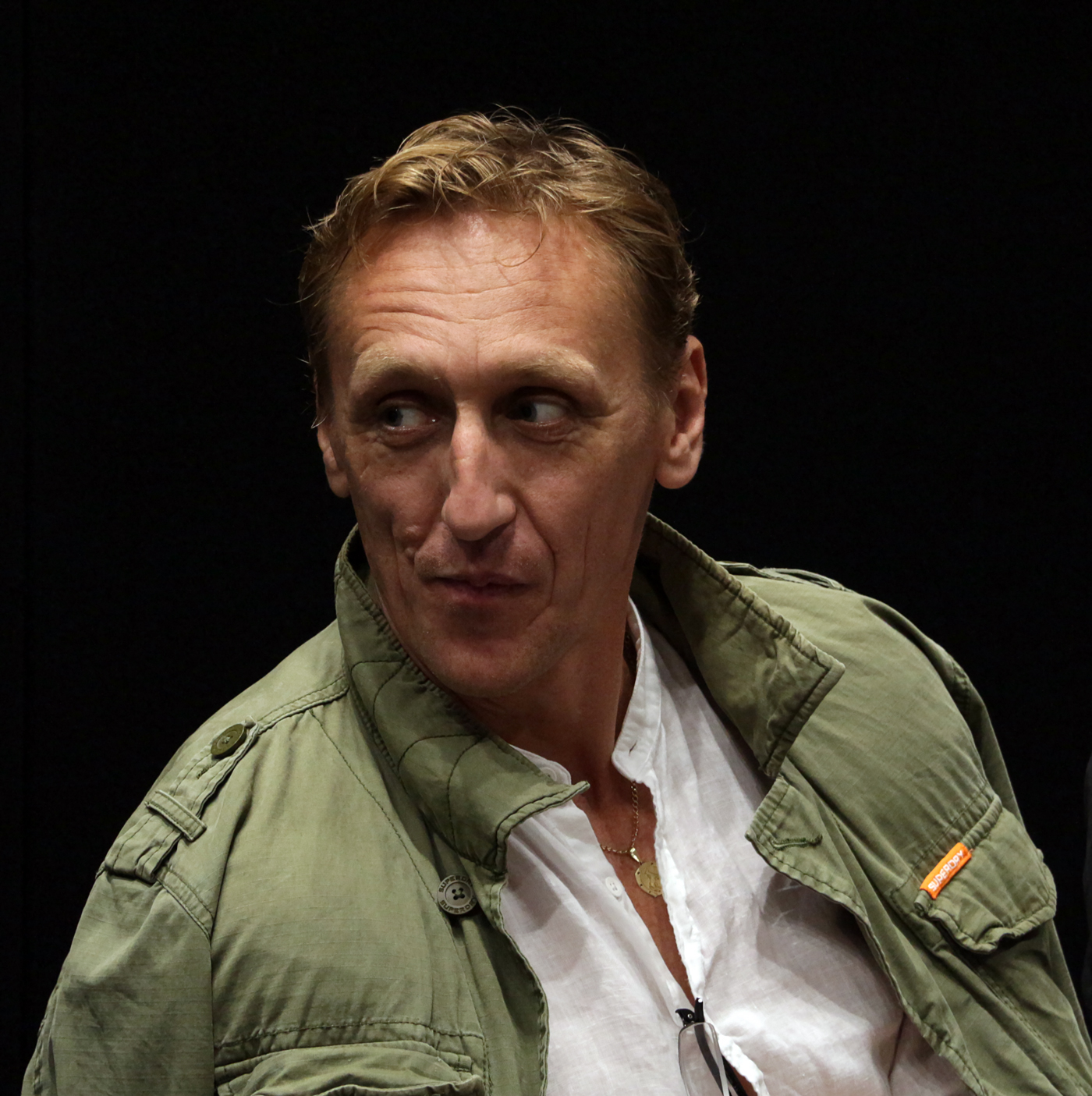
Furdik in 2018

Stunt performer:

- 1990 Tremors
- 1993 The Three Musketeers
- 1996 Dragonheart
- 2001 Uprising
- 2001 Behind Enemy Lines
- 2005 Kingdom of Heaven
- 2006 Eragon
- 2008 The Chronicles of Narnia: Prince Caspian
- 2008 The Mummy: Tomb of the Dragon Emperor
- 2009 Solomon Kane
- 2010 Spartacus
- 2011 The Eagle
- 2011 Season of the Witch
- 2011 War Horse
- 2011 Sherlock Holmes: A Game of Shadows
- 2012 John Carter
- 2012 Prometheus
- 2012 Snow White and the Huntsman
- 2012 Skyfall
- 2013 Thor: The Dark World
- 2014 Noah
- 2014 Hercules
- 2014 Exodus: Gods and Kings
- 2016 The Huntsman: Winter's War
- 2019 The Witcher
- 2021 The Last Duel

Actor:

- 1994 The Dragon Ring
- 2000 Dragonheart: A New Beginning
- 2004 La Femme Musketeer
- 2007 The Last Legion
- 2010 Prince of Persia: The Sands of Time
- 2010 Strike Back
- 2011 Sherlock Holmes: A Game of Shadows
- 2011 Game of Thrones

== See also ==
- Richard Brake
