= Night King =

Fictional character from the Game of Thrones series

The Night King
- Game of Thrones character
- Richard Brake as the Night King
- First appearance: "Oathkeeper" (2014)
- Last appearance: "The Long Night" (2019)
- Created by: David Benioff; D. B. Weiss
- Based on: Night's King by George R. R. Martin
- Portrayed by: Richard Brake (seasons 4–5); Vladimir Furdik (seasons 6–8)

In-universe information
- Species: White Walker
- Gender: Male
- Occupation: Liche King

The Night King is a fictional character and the overarching antagonist of the HBO high fantasy television series Game of Thrones, based on George R. R. Martin's novel series A Song of Ice and Fire. He is depicted as the leader and the first of the White Walkers, having existed since the age of the First Men, and is the most dangerous and powerful of his race. The Night King is an original creation of the television adaptation, thus far having no counterpart in the novels upon which the show is based.

The Night King was portrayed by British-American actor Richard Brake in seasons 4 and 5 and then by Slovak actor and stuntman Vladimir Furdik in seasons 6 to 8.

== Description ==
In Game of Thrones, the Night King is physically distinguished from the other White Walkers by his "crown" of pointy, frosty horns.

== In the novels ==
The "Night King", as presented in the show, has not appeared in A Song of Ice and Fire. In the novels, the title "Night's King" is given to the long-ago legendary 13th Lord Commander of the Night's Watch (generations after the Long Night), who supposedly married a female White Walker and led the Night's Watch to commit atrocities. Regarding whether the character in the television series is the same as the one in the novels, Martin said, "As for the Night's King (the form I prefer), in the books he is a legendary figure, akin to Lann the Clever and Brandon the Builder, and no more likely to have survived to the present day than they have."

== Development ==
Top: Vladimír Furdík as the Night King with only practical effects and prosthetics. Bottom: Added VFX in post-production, with altered eyes and an icy layer.

Makeup artist Barrie Gower said the Night King used mostly practical prosthetic, but also incorporates some visual effects (VFX) to create a more icy look and feel. Gower said about the character's eyes: "The effects department alters the eyes in post-production. They give them that blue-glowy hue to them, which we can't really achieve with contact lenses." With regard to the overall prosthetic, "they've added this sort of icy layer over the top of him to create this—it's something incredibly difficult to achieve practically, prosthetics are cast in a translucent rubber, which can only give you so much of that icy quality, so visual effects help augment it a little bit further to give it more dimension." In the fourth and fifth season, the Night King was portrayed by Richard Brake, with a head mold of Brake being created in order to accurately mold the prosthetic to his face. In the sixth season he was portrayed by Vladimir Furdik after Brake was forced to drop out due to scheduling conflicts stemming from his participation in the TV series The Bastard Executioner. The White Walker army was first shot in front of a green screen in Magheramorne quarry, and according to a piece in The Hollywood Reporter "A scan was taken from a drone and used as the basis for a CG model of the location, which was augmented with VFX and joined with volcanic hills that were photographed in Iceland." Crowd replication was used to create the 1,000-man army, with special effects supervisor Joe Bauer saying "It's scans of those actors in the makeup and costumes, with variations we used to make a digital army that extends up onto the hills." Bauer also noted that VFX were used to create the weather conditions in the scene, noting "It's wind, mist, fog and heavy atmosphere that you'd get in a marine layer. The dramatic value is to say something's wrong; it's a mystery what they are facing. The temperature drops, and our characters can see their breath. The weather obscures their vision." Spain-based El Ranchito, one of several special effects companies used by Game of Thrones, was responsible for the White Walker army shots.

== Storylines ==
=== Season 4 ===
The Night King's first appearance is through a vision Bran Stark has with a Weirwood Heart tree. He experiences a flood of images from the past, present, and future, many of which he was not physically present for. He does not comprehend what all of these images are but, in retrospect, one of them is an image of the Night King picking up the last of Craster's sons off an ice altar.

After Rast leaves Craster's final son in the Haunted Forest, a White Walker retrieves the child. The Walker travels to the White Walkers' fortress in the Lands of Always Winter and lays the child on an altar made of ice. The Night King approaches and places his finger on the boy, transforming him into a White Walker.

=== Season 5 ===
The Night King appears again when Jon Snow and Tormund Giantsbane are coordinating the evacuation of Hardhome. While loading the ships with wildlings, Hardhome is attacked by an army of wights. While assisting in the defense of Hardhome, Jon and Tormund see the Night King observing the battle along with his generals. The Night King also observes Jon destroying a White Walker with his Valyrian steel sword Longclaw, appearing intrigued at the sign of resistance. Jon and his allies are forced to flee Hardhome after the walls fall to the army of the dead; as they sail to safety, they witness the Night King reviving the dead as wights.

=== Season 6 ===
The Night King appears in a vision being observed by Bran and the Three-eyed Raven, where they witness him as a human being forcibly transformed into the first White Walker by the Children of the Forest by impaling him with a dragonglass dagger. Bran subsequently confronts Leaf about creating the White Walkers. She explains that they were at war with the First Men and had no choice.

Later on, Bran decides to observe a vision without the Three-Eyed Raven. He witnesses a massive army of wights led by the Night King, who touches him whilst in the vision. Bran awakens to find a mark where he was touched, and the Three-Eyed Raven warns that he must leave, as the Night King is now able to bypass the magic protecting the Three-Eyed Raven's lair. The Night King and his army quickly arrive and the Night King kills the Three-Eyed Raven, but Bran and Meera Reed are able to escape.

=== Season 7 ===
The Night King is shown leading his army south. Through ravens' eyes, Bran locates the Night King's army beyond the Wall. When the Night King looks up, the ravens disperse, and Bran is pulled out of the warging. He requests that ravens be sent throughout the Seven Kingdoms to warn of the threat.

The Night King is present when the wights and White Walkers battle Jon Snow at the Wight Hunt, who traveled beyond the Wall with the Hound, Jorah, Beric, Thoros, Gendry, Tormund and several other Wildlings to attempt to capture a wight to use as proof for the gathered high lords of Westeros. Remembering their encounter from Hardhome, the Night King keeps his gaze on Jon for some time. Beric Dondarrion suggests trying to kill the Night King; as they know, killing a White Walker kills any and all wights it raised, so killing the Night King might destroy every such monster under his command, putting an end to the Great War before it truly begins. Jon dismisses the plan, however, arguing that trying to fight their way through the wights to reach the Night King would be suicide. When Daenerys Targaryen arrives and her dragons burn many wights, the men try to evacuate on Drogon but the wights continue their attack; using an ice javelin, the Night King kills Viserion. The Night King keeps his gaze on an enraged Jon, who appears on the verge of calling him down to fight directly, but his lieutenant hands him another spear. The Night King throws it at Drogon, but the dragon takes flight and dodges in time. Jon stays on the ground to cover the others' departure, but is pulled into the water, and the others are forced to flee on Drogon. Jon emerges from the water and is saved by Benjen Stark, who gives Jon his horse to ride to Eastwatch while sacrificing himself to hold off the wights. After their battle is over, the Night King reanimates Viserion.

The undead army arrives at Eastwatch; when the Night King appears, riding Viserion, Tormund orders the defenders to evacuate. Breathing blue fire, Viserion destroys Eastwatch and a section of the Wall, allowing the White Walkers and their wight army to finally invade the Seven Kingdoms while the Night King flies overhead towards the North.

=== Season 8 ===
Led by the Night King, the dead quickly advance south and attack Last Hearth, massacring the population and adding them to their army, before marching on Winterfell. Bran, knowing that the Night King intends to destroy him, plans to hide in Winterfell's Godswood as bait, with Jon and Daenerys lying in wait with the dragons to ambush him. However, Jon and Daenerys leave their position to attack the wights when they begin overwhelming Winterfell's defenders, and the Night King engages them with Viserion, resulting in Jon and the Night King being dismounted. Daenerys attempts to burn the Night King with dragonfire, but he emerges unharmed, and she flees when the Night King attempts to kill her dragon Drogon. Jon attempts to fight the Night King, but the Night King reanimates those killed in battle to protect him. The Night King and the White Walkers head to the Godswood for Bran, and are confronted by Theon Greyjoy, whom the Night King kills. However, before he can kill Bran, he is ambushed by Arya Stark, who destroys him by plunging a dagger made out of Valyrian steel into the Night King's chest. With the Night King dead, the White Walkers shatter and the Army of the Dead collapses.

== Other media ==
=== Space Jam: A New Legacy (2021) ===
The Night King also makes a brief cameo as a spectator watching a basketball match in the live-action/animated film Space Jam: A New Legacy.

== Merchandising ==
Dark Horse produced a Night King bust in March 2016, which was followed by an 8-inch Night King figure by Dark Horse Deluxe in late 2016. Funko also released a "Night King" POP! figure that same year.
