= Marilyn Kaye =

American children's writer (born 1949)

- Born: July 19, 1949 (age 77); New Britain, Connecticut, U.S.
- Education: Emory University
- Occupations: Teacher, librarian, novelist
- Writing career
- Pen name: Shannon Blair
- Period: 1984–present
- Genres: Children's literature, Young adult literature, Science fiction
- Notable works: Replica series, Gifted series
- Website: marilynkaye.com

Marilyn Kaye (born July 19, 1949) is an American children's writer. She taught children's literature at St. John's University, New York. She is the author of over 100 children's and young adult novel series, including the successful Replica and Gifted series.

== Biography ==
Marilyn Kaye was born in 1949 in New Britain, Connecticut. She spent most of her childhood in Atlanta, Georgia, although she spent her tenth year in Montgomery, Alabama and her thirteenth in Ann Arbor, Michigan. She kept a diary as a child and wrote in a wide range of formats.

Marilyn majored in English at Emory University, going on to study a master's degree in library science at Emory and a Doctor of Philosophy degree at the University of Chicago, with the thesis title "The nature of didacticism as related to romance and sexuality in young adult novels, 1965–1978". She taught children's literature at St. John's University, New York for over twenty years. She began publishing her work in 1984 under the pen name Shannon Blair, and has since had much success, particularly with the internationally selling Replica series.

== Replica ==
"Replica" is a children's science fiction series about Amy Candler, a young teenager who discovers she is one of thirteen cloned girls who have been genetically modified to have superhuman abilities. She was created in the government-funded Project Crescent, and was kidnapped and adopted by one of the scientists after a change of heart. Throughout the series Amy struggles to live a normal life as the mysterious Organisation tries to use her and the other Project Crescent clones to create a master race and take over the world. Amy also seeks to help the other clones in the project, and encounters a number of other children and teenagers with genetic modifications or supernatural powers.

This series is very popular and has been sold internationally. Parts of the series have been translated into Finnish, Polish, and German, for example.

=== Books ===
There are twenty-four books in the original series, published regularly between 1998 and 2002. A separate trilogy based on the same characters was also published in 2002.

1. Amy, Number 7: Whilst writing an autobiography for an English project, Amy begins to question the identity of her "father", who supposedly died before she was born. She is also confused by her suddenly increased physical abilities and powers of healing. She is shocked to discover that she is one of thirteen clones created in a government project which her "mother" was part of.

2. Pursuing Amy: Amy struggles to hide her true identity from her friends, particularly when her mother's new boyfriend turns out to be from the organization attempting to track her down. She eventually reveals her abilities to Eric, her best friend's brother. Amy also sees another clone for the first time.

3. Another Amy: Another clone comes to Amy's school to film a movie, and is horrified by Amy's insistence that they are clones. Over time, Amy begins to realise that this clone is very unlike Amy – she is evil. Also, Amy begins dating Eric.

4. Perfect Girls: Amy thinks she has won the trip of a lifetime to New York, but she soon discovers this is a front to capture and test herself and seven other clones. Amy eventually escapes, but no-one believes her story.

5. Secret Clique: When a group of popular girls appear to gain supernatural abilities, Amy begins to investigate, confusing her best friend Tasha and boyfriend Eric.

6. And The Two Shall Meet: Amy meets a boy named Andy at a wilderness camp, and is instantly attracted to him. When someone dies in a freak accident, Andy claims he witnessed the murder and convinces Amy to run away with him. However, Amy grows suspicious and discovers that Andy is another clone, designed to be her perfect other half.

7. The Best of the Best: When Eric is asked to show around a new student, obnoxious eight-year-old child genius Adrian Peele, Amy senses something is not right. She is surprised to discover that, rather than being a victim, Adrian runs a genetics company.

8. Mystery Mother: Amy has always been satisfied that her mother loves her, even though they are not genetically related. However, when a woman claims to be Amy's birth mother, and accuses Nancy of kidnap, Amy begins to wonder if she really is a clone.

9. The Fever: When Amy, who has been genetically modified to never become ill, suddenly becomes feverish and hallucinates, her mother believes that Amy must have been drugged at the new club in town. However, when a doctor arrives for a blood sample, Tasha suspects something more sinister is going on.

10. Ice Cold: Amy fears her secret will be revealed to the world after her worst enemy Jeanine discovers that Amy is a clone and begins blackmailing her. However, Jeanine ends up in a coma, making Amy the main suspect.

11. Lucky Thirteen: Amy meets Aly, another clone who was rejected by the project because of her lack of special abilities. Aly encourages Amy to act out, but Aly's desire to live up to Amy's perfection leads her into trouble. Eventually, Amy is forced to break contact.

12. In Search of Andy: On a trip to Paris, Amy is surprised to run into Andy, her "perfect match" who disappeared suddenly the summer before. She wants to find Andy, but she suspects that he might be leading her into a trap.

13. The Substitute: Amy is at risk after the death of her mysterious ally, Mr Devon. Amy suspects that the cruel new teacher at school, Ms Heartshorn, is there to kidnap her, but the truth is not what she expected.

14. The Beginning: A trip to Washington DC, home of Project Crescent, puts Amy on edge. Meanwhile, Amy's mother remembers the origins of the project, including the pain of losing her brother to a genetic disorder and the betrayal which puts Amy at risk in the modern day.

15. Transformation: When Tasha and Amy's other classmates begin to act like zombies, Amy suspects they have been influenced by the new TV show, Cherry Lane.

16. Happy Birthday, Dear Amy: On the eve of Amy's thirteenth birthday, she suddenly ages into her twenties. After she impulsively runs away from the private hospital where she is being treated, she finds herself at a very unusual homeless shelter.

17. Missing Pieces: Amy becomes suspicious when her fellow students start losing their most prized abilities, such as a sprinter losing his running ability and a basketball player forgetting how to throw. Meanwhile, Eric has begun High School and has little time for Amy any more, leading her to become fascinated with newcomer Chris.

18. Return of the Perfect Girls: Thinking she is headed on a romantic cruise with her new boyfriend Chris, Amy is kidnapped by the organisation and taken to a desert island. There, she must compete with the other Amys and Andys in a Survivor-style competition, in which those voted off face death.

19. Dreamcrusher: After being struck by lightning, Amy develops the unwanted ability to read minds and see the future.

20. Like Father, Like Son: After Chris's absent father returns asking for a bone marrow transplant, Amy suspects that Chris and many of her other classmates are clones intended as organ donors for the wealthy.

21. Virtual Amy: After Andy mysteriously disappears after giving her a warning, Amy becomes worried by a new virtual reality computer game.

22. All About Andy: Andy investigates the truth about his past and his family.

23. War of the Clones: When a tabloid runs a story of human clones creating a master race, Amy and Andy begin to uncover the truth about Project Crescent and The Organisation.

24. Amy, On Her Own: When Amy's crescent birthmark fades and she and the other clones begin experiencing new physical problems, they fear that their genes are deteriorating. Amy tries to cope with the possibility that she must return to a normal life.

The Plague Trilogy: A miniseries about Amy's battle against a deadly plague which threatens to destroy civilisation.

- 1. Rewind: Amy travels back in time to prevent the plague from beginning.
- 2. Play: Amy travels inside a human body to fight the plague within them.
- 3. Fast Forward: After she is exposed as a clone and rejected, Amy travels to a world where everyone is a clone like her.

== Gifted ==
Gifted is the latest series by Marilyn Kaye and features a small class of students at Meadowbrook Middle School Each has a different supernatural ability, or "Gift", and they all attend a class to learn to use these abilities, although few people outside the class know about them. The class teacher, Madame, encourages the students to work together to use their abilities, particularly as they are being targeted by a group who wants to control their abilities to make money. However, the students dislike their abilities and each other, and are often reluctant to join forces.

The first book was published in February 2009, with the latest installment scheduled for publishing September 2010. Although only six books have so far been announced, each book so far has focused on a different student, suggesting the series will run to nine books in total. As of May 2020, there have been no announcements or updates about continuing this series. Goodreads has it listed as a completed series with 6 books, or two volumes (vol. 1 contains the first three books, and vol. 2 contains the last three books). It was adapted into a TV series, Gifted, by Black Camel Pictures and Media Valley for the BBC in 2025

=== Characters ===
- Amanda Beeson: A cruel queen bee who is disliked by her classmates. She is frequently mean, and tries to avoid empathising with people as, when she does, she uncontrollably possesses their body for an indeterminate amount of time. When she possesses a body, the person she is possessing "blacks out" and a "fake" Amanda with no real emotions takes her place. She generally tries to avoid this, although her classmates believe she purposefully uses her ability out of spite. Over the course of the series, she tries to help the class but is often ignored and taunted. She has a crush on Ken. Which is shown in a later series.
- Jenna Kelley: A telepathic Goth with a reputation as a juvenile delinquent. Many of her friends outside the Gifted class are criminals, and she is frequently in trouble with the law because of her involvement with them. This led to a brief time in reform school. Her mother is an alcoholic who has frequently failed to complete rehab, and they face financial difficulties. Jenna's father disappeared many years ago, and in Better Late than Never Jenna learns of his death. Although she is initially annoyed by her classmates, she develops a friendship with Tracey and Emily as the series progresses.
- Emily Sanders: A girl known for day-dreaming, which is actually caused by near-constant visions of the future. Her ability is hard to control and her visions are difficult to interpret, often seeming meaningless until after the event they depict. She feels guilty for not warning her father when she predicted his death in a car accident.
- Ken Preston: A popular athletic student, who no longer plays sports after a sporting accident killed his best friend. Ken can contact the dead telepathically, although he is irritated by their constant requests for his help which he is incapable of completing without revealing his ability and appearing delusional.
- Tracey Devon: A shy, plain girl who feels constantly ignored, particularly by her parents, who care more for her septuplet siblings. Her feelings of invisibility cause her to become invisible, although as her confidence grows she gains more control of this ability. She is possessed by Amanda for a long period in Out of Sight, Out of Mind, and receives a makeover and change of life which helps her become confident. Tracey is friends with Jenna, and has her to stay while her mother is in rehab. Trace also has seven sisters called the "Devon Seven."
- Charles Temple: A selfish and unhelpful boy in a wheelchair. He is telekinetic, but he refuses to use his abilities except for personal gain.
- Sarah Miller: A kind, friendly girl with the ability to control the actions of others. She is very afraid of her power, and refuses to use it unless absolutely necessary.
- Martin Cooper: A victim of bullying who becomes supernaturally strong when angry.
- Carter Street: A mute amnesiac found wandering Carter Street.

=== Books ===
1. Out of Sight, Out of Mind: Amanda finds herself trapped in Tracey's body, with her own place occupied by a clone. Reluctantly, she decides to improve Tracey's life, ending her years of invisibility. Meanwhile, the Gifted class fights off a TA who attempts to hypnotise Emily to predict the lottery.

2. Better Late Than Never: Jenna, who has begun to befriend Tracey, is shocked by the sudden reappearance of her "father", not realising that this man is a fraud who wants her ability to win at poker. Meanwhile, Amanda possesses Ken and develops a romance with a dead boy.

3. Here Today, Gone Tomorrow: Emily is worried by visions that her classmates are disappearing. Soon, many of them are kidnapped and forced to rob a bank, but the remaining classmates work together to rescue them in time.

4. Finders Keepers: Ken struggles to simultaneously help his dead friend Jack look after his girlfriend, and keep his ability secret after attending a seance at which a boy begs for help finding his dead father's winning lottery ticket. Meanwhile, Amanda possesses the body of a woman plotting to steal the boy's money, uncovering a conspiracy acting against the class.

5. Now You See Me: Tracey investigates her suspicion that there is a spy in the class, particularly after Jenna is framed for a crime she didn't commit and sent away. Meanwhile, Amanda volunteers in the school office to investigate the principal's involvement in the conspiracy.

6. Speak No Evil: Carter is at Harmony House and has talks with Dr. Paley. It is revealed that he has a gift which is shape-shifting. Meanwhile, in the gifted class, Madame tries to get everyone to think of positive ways to use their gifts, while Ken and Amanda find no point to, so they think of losing their gifts. Dr. Paley might have the answer.

== Bibliography ==
Works by Marilyn Kaye include:

- Celebrating Children's Books, published 1981. A collection of essays edited by Marilyn Kaye and Betsy Hearne.
- Films, Young People and Libraries, a non-fiction work published 1984.
- Sweet Dreams, a long-running novel series contributed to by many authors:
  - Call Me Beautiful, written under the pseudonym Shannon Blair, published 1984.
  - Starstruck, written under the pseudonym Shannon Blair, published 1985.
  - Wrong Kind of Boy, written under the pseudonym Shannon Blair, published 1985.
  - Kiss and Tell, written under the pseudonym Shannon Blair, published 1985.
- Will You Cross Me?, illustrated by Ned Delaney, published 1985.
- Baby Fozzie Is Afraid of the Dark, published 1986 in Weekly Reader. A story based around Muppets character Fozzie Bear.
- Out of This World, published 1986–1989. A nonconformist alien named Max comes to Earth to learn about human emotions, but faces trouble with her literal interpretation of human culture:
  - Max on Earth
  - Max in Love
  - Max on Fire
  - Max Flips Out
  - Max Goes Bad
  - Max All Over
- Sisters, published 1987–1989. A family of four girls face struggles in their everyday lives:
  - Phoebe
  - Daphne
  - Cassie
  - Lydia
  - A Friend Like Phoebe
- The Best Baby-Sitter in the World, published 1987.
- Zoobille Zoo: Big Mess, illustrated by Carol Hudson, published 1987.
- Miss Piggy and the Big Gorilla, published 1988. Based around Muppets character Miss Piggy.
- What a Teddy Bear Needs, published 1989.
- Gonzo the Great, published 1989. Based around Muppets character Gonzo.
- Camp Sunnyside Friends, published 1989–1992. Friends Katie, Trina, Megan, Sarah and Erin enjoy their holidays at Camp Sunnyside:
  - No Boys Allowed
  - Cabin Six Plays Cupid
  - Color War
  - New Girl in Cabin Six
  - Looking for Trouble
  - Katie Steals the Show
  - A Witch in Cabin Six
  - Too Many Counselors
  - The New-and-Improved Sarah
  - Erin and the Movie Star
  - The Problem With Parents
  - The Tennis Trap
  - Big Sister Blues
  - Megan's Ghost
  - Christmas Break
  - Happily Ever After
  - Camp Spaghetti
  - Balancing Act
  - My Camp Memory Book: A Camp Sunnyside Friends Special
  - Christmas Reunion: A Camp Sunnyside Friends Special
  - School Daze: A Camp Sunnyside Friends Back to School Special
  - The Spirit of Sunnyside: A Camp Sunnyside Friends Christmas Special
- The Real Tooth Fairy, illustrated by Helen Cogancherry, published 1990. A child questions the existence of the tooth fairy, but her mother explains away the doubts.
- Attitude, published 1990.
- Three of a Kind, published 1990–1991. Orphans Cat, Josie, and Becka are adopted by the same family:
  - With Friends Like These, Who Needs Enemies?
  - Home's a Nice Place to Visit, but I Wouldn't Want to Live There
  - Will the Real Becka Morgan Please Stand Up?
  - Two's Company, Four's a Crowd
  - Cat Morgan, Working Girl
  - 101 Ways to Win Homecoming Queen
- The Atonement of Mindy Wise, published 1991. Yom Kippur prompts a girl to atone for the sins she has committed to gain popularity.
- A Day with No Math, illustrated by Tim Bowers, published 1992.
- Disney's The Little Mermaid: The Same Old Song, illustrated by Fred Marvin, published 1992. Based around Disney's The Little Mermaid.
- Disney's The Little Mermaid: Reflections of Arsulu, illustrated by Fred Marvin, published 1992. Based around Disney's The Little Mermaid.
- Changes Romance, a series of romance books contributed to by several authors:
  - Runaway, published 1992.
  - Choose Me, published 1992.
- Real Heroes, published 1993. A boy is torn when his father campaigns against his HIV-positive teacher.
- Video High, published 1994–1995. A group of teenagers from the same high school star in a TV show:
  - Modern Love
  - The High Life
  - Date Is a Four-Letter Word
  - The Body Beautiful
  - The Colors of the Heart
  - Checking Out
  - Groupies
  - Secrets & Lies
  - French Kisses
- After School Club, published 1997. A group of third graders attend the same after school club:
  - Jill's Happy Un-Birthday
  - Valentine's Day Surprise
  - Teammates
- Dream Lover, published 1995. A girl is drawn to an amnesiac who she suspects is a reincarnated rock star.
- Club Paradise, published 1995–1997:
  - Scandal in Paradise
  - Trouble in Paradise
  - Stranger in Paradise
- Double Click Cafe, published 1997. A group of teens face encounters online and IRL in an Internet cafe:
  - Cyber Kiss
  - Love Bytes
  - Access Romance
  - Control and Escape
- Last on Earth, published 1998–1999. A group of High School seniors leave their maths class to discover that everyone else on Earth has vanished. Over the course of the series the group try to discover what happens, forging their own society as they do so. Eventually, they realise that an alien civilisation has kidnapped the Earth's inhabitants:
  - The Vanishing
  - The Convergence
  - The Return
- Replica, published 1998–2002. See above.
- Penelope, published 2007. A novelisation of the movie Penelope, based on the original screenplay by Leslie Caveny.
- Demon Chick, published 2009. Jessica is shocked to learn that her mother has sold her to the Devil to get ahead in her career.
- Gifted, published 2009–present. See above.
- Ticket to Love, published 2012. Four girlfriends travel to New York City for a long weekend and encounter a variety of romantic adventures.
- White Lies and Tiaras, published 2012. Alice, Lara, and their boyfriends go to Paris for a wedding, and find romantic surprises in the City of Lights.
- Gloss, published 2013. In 1963, a group of girls learn about life as magazine interns in the city that never sleeps.
