= Julian Wadham =

English actor

- Born: Julian Neil Rohan Wadham; 7 August 1958 (age 68); Ware, Hertfordshire, England
- Education: Ampleforth College; Central School of Speech and Drama
- Occupation: Actor
- Years active: 1981–present

Julian Neil Rohan Wadham (born 7 August 1958) is an English actor of stage, film and television.

== Early life ==
The third son of Rohan Nicholas Wadham DFC and Juliana Wadham (née Macdonald Walker), Wadham was educated at Ampleforth College and the Central School of Speech and Drama.

== Career ==
Wadham's theatre work includes playing Barclay (soon after leaving the Central School) in the original West End production of Julian Mitchell's Another Country at the Queens Theatre with Kenneth Branagh and fellow Old Amplefordian Rupert Everett. In 2014, he played Vaughan Cunningham, a visitor to the school, in the Trafalgar Studio revival of Another Country.

For the English Stage Company at the Royal Court he was directed by Max Stafford-Clark in Falkland Sound, as Lieutenant David Tinker RN (with Paul Jesson, Lesley Manville and Marion Bailey), as Captain Plume in George Farquhar's The Recruiting Officer, as Lt. Ralph Clark in Timberlake Wertenbaker's Our Country's Good, and as Jake in Caryl Churchill's Serious Money (with Lesley Manville, Alfred Molina, Gary Oldman and Meera Syal).

For director Jeremy Herrin he appeared with Lindsay Duncan, Matt Smith and Felicity Jones as Hugh in Polly Stenham's That Face, both at the Royal Court and at the Duke of York's Theatre. Herrin also directed him in the National Theatre production of James Graham's This House, as Humphrey Atkins, in both Cottesloe and Olivier theatres, and in the West End revival of Another Country, in which he played Vaughan Cunningham.

His other National Theatre work includes roles in the following productions directed by Sir Nicholas Hytner: The Madness of King George (in which he played Prime Minister William Pitt opposite Nigel Hawthorne's King George); Don Pedro in Much Ado About Nothing (with Simon Russell Beale and Zoë Wanamaker); Polixenes in The Winter's Tale; Tartuffe (with Martin Clunes and Margaret Tyzack); The Changeling (with Miranda Richardson, directed by Richard Eyre); and Mountain Language (directed by Harold Pinter).

Other theatre roles include: Antonio in The Tempest at the Haymarket (directed by Sir Trevor Nunn with Ralph Fiennes); Duke Theseus in A Midsummer Night's Dream at the Rose Theatre (with Dame Judi Dench and directed by Sir Peter Hall); Marshall Dorfling in The Prince of Homburg at the Donmar Warehouse; Raymond Brock in Plenty (with Cate Blanchett) for the Almeida at the Albery; Elyot in Private Lives (Theatre Royal Bath). He also appeared in The Good Samaritan in Hampstead; A Letter of Resignation at the Comedy (with Edward Fox); and When We Are Married at the Whitehall.

He has appeared in numerous television productions, including The Casual Vacancy, Silk, Midsomer Murders, Lewis, Middlemarch, Father Brown, The Trial of Lord Lucan (as Lord Lucan), Rosemary and Thyme, and Dalziel and Pascoe.

In December 2014, he finished filming Miramax's The 9th Life of Louis Drax, scripted by Max Minghella. As of December 2015, he was continuing to recreate the role of John Steed in Big Finish's audio series The Avengers – The Lost Episodes.

== Works ==
=== Film ===
- Maurice (1987) – Hull
- The Madness of King George (1994) – Pitt the Younger
- The Secret Agent (1996) – The Assistant Commissioner
- The English Patient (1996, included in a 1996 nomination for Best Cast for the film) – Madox
- Preaching to the Perverted (1997) – M'Learned Friend
- Keep the Aspidistra Flying (1997) – Ravelston
- The Commissioner (1998) – Prime Minister
- High Heels and Low Lifes (2001) – Rogers
- Gypsy Woman (2001) – Stanley
- A Different Loyalty (2004) – Andrew Darcy
- Exorcist: The Beginning (2004) – Major Granville
- Dominion: Prequel to the Exorcist (2005) – Major Granville
- Wah-Wah (2005) – Charles Bingham
- Goya's Ghosts (2006) – Joseph Bonaparte
- Outpost (2008) – Hunt
- Fake Identity (2008) – Sterling
- Legacy (2009) – Gregor Salenko
- War Horse (2010) – Trench Captain
- The Iron Lady (2011) – Francis Pym
- Cheerful Weather for the Wedding (2012) – Uncle Bob
- Outpost: Black Sun (2012) – Francis Hunt
- Now Is Good (2012) – Dr. Ryan
- The Scapegoat (2012) – Headmaster
- National Theatre Live: This House (2013) – Humphrey Atkins
- Queen and Country (2014) – Colonel Fielding
- The Riot Club (2014) – Miles' Father
- The 9th Life of Louis Drax (2016) – Dr. Janek
- Churchill (2017) – General Montgomery
- Victoria & Abdul (2017) – Alick Yorke
- Tokyo Trial (2017) – Erima H. Northcroft
- Colette (2018) – Ollendorff
- The Happy Prince (2018) – Mr. Arbuthnott
- The Song of Names (2019) – Arbuthnot Bailey

=== Television ===
- Baal with David Bowie (1982)
- Blind Justice (1988) as James Bingham
- Casualty – "Drake's Drum" as Rev. Tony Vassar (1988)
- Bergerac (1990) as David Russell
- Agatha Christie's Poirot – "The Plymouth Express" as Robert Carrington (1991)
- Middlemarch (1994) as Sir James Chettam
- The Trial of Lord Lucan as Lord Lucan (1994)
- Dance to the Music of Time as General Liddament (1997)
- Pie in the Sky – Series 3, Episode 35, "Pork Pies" (1997) as Anthony Neale
- The Wingless Bird as Reginald Farrier – TV mini-series (1997)
- Highlander: The Raven – "The Ex-Files" (1999)
- Midsomer Murders (Episode: "Death's Shadow") (1999) as Simon Fletcher
- The Inspector Lynley Mysteries – "Payment in Blood" (2001)
- Hitler: The Rise of Evil as Captain Karl Mayr (2003)
- Island at War (2004) as Urban Mahy
- Rosemary & Thyme – Episode 2.13 (2004) as Lord Elshingham
- Tom Brown's Schooldays as Squire Brown (2005)
- Dalziel and Pascoe – Series 9 "Dust Thou Art" (2005) as Richard Johnstone
- Egypt – Episodes 1 and 2, as Lord Carnarvon (2005)
- Taggart – Series 22, Episode 4 Running Out of Time as Brigadier Johnny Lewis-Scott (2005)
- The Government Inspector as Jonathan Powell (2005)
- Agatha Christie's Marple – "Sleeping Murder" as Kelvin Halliday (2006)
- Nuremberg: Nazis on Trial (2006) as David Maxwell Fyfe
- Ghostboat as Captain Nathan Byrnes (2006)
- My Boy Jack (2007) as King George V
- Foyle's War – "Plan of Attack" (2008) as "W" (Cmdr Stephen Foster)
- Midsomer Murders (Episode: "The Creeper") (2009) as William Chettham
- Lewis – "The Point of Vanishing" (2009) as Tom Rattenbury
- Downton Abbey as General Sir Herbert Strutt – Episode 2.3 (2012)
- Father Brown – "The Flying Stars" as Colonel Reginald Adams (2013)
- Silk (2013) as Lever
- The Casual Vacancy (2015) as Aubrey Sweetlove
- Tokyo Trial (2016) as Erima Harvey Northcroft
- Brother Francis: The Barefoot Saint of Assisi (2016 podcast series) as Pope Innocent III
- Death in Paradise as Frank Henderson (2 episodes) (2017)
- The Singapore Grip as Soloman Langfield (2019)
- The Crown as David Stancliffe (2023)
- The Chelsea Detective as Andrew Mansfield MP (2024)

=== Audio ===
- The Minister of Chance as The Minister of Chance (2011–2013)

=== Theatre ===
- Another Country, Queens Theatre
- When We Are Married, Whitehall Theatre
- Falkland Sound, Royal Court
- Serious Money, Royal Court
- Our Country's Good, Royal Court
- The Recruiting Officer, Royal Court
- Carrington, Royal National Theatre
- Mountain Language, Royal National Theatre
- The Changeling, Royal National Theatre
- Once in a While the Odd Thing Happens, Royal National Theatre
- The Madness of George III, Royal National Theatre
- Plenty, Almeida at the Albery
- The Good Samaritan, Hampstead Theatre
- The Winter's Tale, Royal National Theatre
- Tartuffe, Royal National Theatre
- Private Lives, Theatre Royal Bath
- That Face, Royal Court
- Much Ado About Nothing, Royal National Theatre
- A Midsummer Night's Dream, Rose Theatre, Kingston
- The Prince of Homburg, Donmar Warehouse
- The Tempest, Theatre Royal Haymarket
- This House, Royal National Theatre
- Another Country, Theatre Royal Bath/Chichester Festival Theatre/Trafalgar Studio

== Awards and nominations ==
| Year | Award | Category | Nominated work | Result |
|---|---|---|---|---|
| 1997 | 3rd Screen Actors Guild Awards | Outstanding Performance by a Cast in a Motion Picture (shared with the cast) | The English Patient | Nominated |
