= Laurence Clark (comedian) =

British stand-up comedian, writer, actor, presenter, and disability rights campaigner

Laurence Clark is a British stand-up comedian, writer, actor, presenter, and disability rights campaigner. Clark was born with cerebral palsy and uses his line of work to alter the general public's perceptions of disabled people.

== Stand-up comedy ==
At the Labour Party conference in 2005, Clark was called a 'sit-down comedian' by the then-Prime Minister's wife Cherie Blair, referring to him being a wheelchair user. Clark shrugged off the press attention, saying she was just cracking a "crap joke".

Clark gave his first live stand-up show, The All-Star Charity Show, at the Edinburgh Festival Fringe in 2003. It was described by The Scotsman critic, Kate Copstick, as a "powerful comedy voice" and "stunningly hard-hitting". and was a Critics' Choice in The Times. Clark's next show, The Jim Davidson Guide to Equality, was based upon comparisons between Jim Davidson's stand-up and Tony Blair's manifesto speeches. A teenage experience of appearing on Jim'll Fix It with Jimmy Savile provided the basis for Jim Fixed It for Me, performed at the 2006 Edinburgh Festival.

Clark's show at the 2007 Edinburgh Festival, 12% Evil, used video clips and Powerpoint slides to ridicule common clichés and stereotypes about disabled people. Spastic Fantastic (2008), charted Clark's mission, as someone who has cerebral palsy, to rescue the word ‘spastic’ through various means, including the use of secret cameras. Health Hazard (2011), focused on the dangers of privatising the British National Health Service. He won a commission from the London 2012 Cultural Olympiad to produce a new show in that year.

Clark also occasionally performs as part of the comedy group "Abnormally Funny People", with Steve Best, Liz Carr, Tanyalee Davis, Chris McCausland, Steve Day and Simon Minty.

== Television ==
Clark has appeared on "Are You Having A Laugh? TV and Disability" (BBC2); The Heaven and Earth Show (BBC 1); Embarrassing Bodies (Channel 4); The London Programme (ITV); The Shooting Party (Channel 4) and I'm With Stupid (BBC 3). In October 2004 he was a reporter on Newsnight (BBC 2), presenting a short film about disability and the UK Abortion Act. Clark and his family are the subject of a documentary film as part of BBC 1's Beyond Disability season called ‘We Won't Drop the Baby’ to be screened on 25 March 2012 on BBC 1, narrated by David Tennant.. He wrote two episodes of Gifted for Black Camel Pictures and Media Valley in 2025.

== Stage ==
On stage Clark has acted with Graeae Theatre Company, playing Richard in their forum theatre play The Trouble with Richard. He also appeared in David Thacker’s A Midsummer Night's Dream at Bolton's Octagon Theatre, about which The Guardian said "his wheelchair-assisted Wall is indeed 'the wittiest partition that I ever heard discourse.'"

In 2026 Clark's comedy Cured premiered at Liverpool's Royal Court Theatre, the play tells the story of four young disabled Scousers on a pilgrimage to Lourdes and is based on Clark's own experiences of visiting Lourdes as a teenager. The play was directed by inclusive company Birds of Paradise, with whomed Clark had previously work whilst performing in Purposeless Movements.

== Personal life ==
Laurence Clark lives in Liverpool with his wife and two children.
