= Outpost: Black Sun =

- Theatrical poster
- Directed by: Steve Barker
- Written by: Steve Barker; Rae Brunton
- Produced by: Arabella Croft; Kieran Parker; Nigel Thomas
- Starring: Catherine Steadman; Richard Coyle; Clive Russell; Michael Byrne; Johnny Meres
- Cinematography: Darran Tiernan
- Edited by: Bill Gill, Chris Gill
- Music by: Theo Green
- Production companies: Black Camel Pictures; Matador Pictures
- Distributed by: ContentFilm
- Release date: 11 May 2012 (United Kingdom)
- Running time: 101 minutes
- Country: United Kingdom
- Language: English

Outpost: Black Sun, also known as Outpost 2, is a 2012 British war horror film directed by Steve Barker, based on a script written by himself and Rae Brunton. It is a sequel to Barker's 2008 film Outpost. The film was later followed by Outpost: Rise of the Spetsnaz, the third entry in the series.

== Plot ==
Nazi-hunter Lena trails former SS Gruppenführer Neurath, who worked with a war-criminal named Klausener during World War II, to Paraguay. While interrogating Neurath, he suffers a fatal heart attack after taunting her about an active cabal of Nazi loyalists. She searches his apartment and finds a map of the former Yugoslavia, documents relating to British engineer Francis Hunt, and a ring with a retractable key embedded in the signet.

Meanwhile, the same team of mercenaries who arrived at the end of the first film breach the outpost and manoeuvre into the complex. An elderly Klausener watches via a direct feed from a helmet-cam as they are promptly attacked and slaughtered by a battalion of zombie Waffen-SS troops, led by SS Brigadeführer Götz.

In the former Yugoslavia Lena runs into Wallace, an ambiguous acquaintance and physicist seeking truth about the unified field theory; he believes Hunt and his team are dead and that no one should control what they were searching for, Die Glocke. He explains that a NATO rapid reaction force has been secretly battling the undead SS guards, who have been slaughtering villagers across the region and inflicting heavy casualties on the NATO troops. According to a contact in a local militia group, a reality bending electromagnetic field has been steadily expanding across the countryside with the source at the outpost bunker.

Lena and Wallace trek to the militia camp, to find it under attack from the SS, with the militiamen and NATO soldiers stationed there slaughtered, including Wallace's contact. Hiding under a soldier's corpse, Lena witnesses an SS-Mann brutally kill a militiaman. The next morning Lena and Wallace discover NATO forces failed to set off an EMP to disable the machine protecting the SS guards. Continuing through the countryside they discover devastated villages. Wallace explains his knowledge from his journal of runic symbols and history about Black Sun - the Wunderwaffe group responsible for creating Die Glocke. They run into an undead SS group but are saved by a British SAS fireteam led by Macavoy and Abbot, with Carlise, Hall and engineer Tech; the latter recognises Wallace but dies in a skirmish whilst setting up an EMP to disable a small area of the surrounding electromagnetic field, allowing the SAS to permanently kill the attacking SS troopers. The British enlist Wallace as their engineer and Macavoy orders Lena to leave them until reinforcements arrive.

Lena follows them and helps them survive another SS attack. They begrudgingly allow her to join, explaining their mission is to secure Die Glocke before a tactical nuclear strike is launched on the bunker. They reach the outpost and trace the cabling to reach Die Glocke's engine room, but discover the machine has been moved. Hunt's documents and equations are graffitied on the walls, leading Wallace to deduce Klausner's people hired Hunt to retrieve the device. The soldiers are attacked by an SS guard and Macavoy is killed. Wallace determines Die Glocke was moved deeper into the bunker via a lift hidden behind the chamber's forward wall; Abbot, now in command, orders Hall to set-up flares giving the all-clear for the NATO strike once they evacuate.

The lift takes them underground where they find bodies of locals and mercenaries dumped in piles by the SS, led by an undead SS matron. Carlise distracts them and saves Lena from being discovered, but he is stabbed to death by the matron. Wallace locates the control schematics and points them to the containment chamber; Abbot and Lena find Hunt's body hardwired to Die Glocke's large generator that controls the undead SS; Götz has managed to increase the generator's electro-magnetic emission range, enabling his battalion to expand beyond the bunker's initial containment field. Abbot is killed in an ambush whilst Hall is caught in a struggle with an SS-Mann and accidentally sets off the flares; with communications down via the EMP field, they are unable to call-off the launch. Wallace manages to trip an EMP wave that temporarily leaves all nearby SS guards vulnerable, allowing Hall to kill the matron and two other guards.

Hunt, barely alive, reveals the machine's unified field core device could only be powered down by Black Sun personnel who had the operating keys. Lena produces Neurath's ring with the key to deactivate the core but is stopped by Götz. Wallace is saved by Hall and they go to find the others. Götz prepares to inject Lena but Hunt uses his last remaining life force to discharge the core's containment energy into the reviving SS platoon. Lena grabs the key and shuts down the waves of esotericism energy containing the guards; Götz manages to hold-off Hunt's attack but is beaten and his skull smashed by Lena, destroying him. She retrieves Die Glocke's field containment core and rendezvous with Wallace and Hall in the lift. Wallace suddenly executes Hall and wounds Lena, leaving her to die and escapes just before the outpost is bombed.

Sometime later, Wallace meets Klausner with one half the core as a bargaining chip in case he is double-crossed, whilst holding the other half at an auction. He suddenly receives a call from Lena, who survived the strike by hiding deep underground in the bunker; she warns him she is coming for him and Klausner.

== Cast ==
- Catherine Steadman as Lena
- Richard Coyle as Wallace
- Clive Russell as Marius
- Daniel Caltagirone as Macavoy
- Gary Abbot as Abbot
- Ali Craig as Hall
- Nick Nevern as Carlise
- Johnny Meres as SS Brigadeführer Götz
- Julian Wadham as Francis Hunt
- Michael Byrne as SS Gruppenführer Neurath
- Martin Bell as Young Neurath
- David Gant as Klausener

== Production ==
Original Outpost producers Kieran Parker and Arabella Croft were joined by Matador producer Nigel Thomas for this sequel.

Filming took place at the old Lockerbie Academy (prior to its demolition), Kirkcudbright Army Training Area and on the Balmaghie estate near Castle Douglas.

== Reception ==
Critical reception for Outpost: Black Sun has been negative. What Culture panned the film overall stating that although it initially held promise, the film "devolves into tedious trotting around dilapidated German villages" and that "even if the direction and performances are generally decent for a film of the type, it plays out like a dull mission from a particularly naff first-person-shooter video game, until an absurd final boss – a super-Nazi hooked up to electricity – appears, and makes it even more difficult to take seriously". In contrast, Anton Bitel of Little White Lies was positive in his review and praised the film's performances and production values.
