= Outpost: Rise of the Spetsnaz =

- Directed by: Kieran Parker
- Written by: Rae Brunton
- Story by: Kieran Parker; Rae Brunton
- Produced by: Arabella Page Croft; Kieran Parker
- Starring: Bryan Larkin; Iván Kamarás; Michael McKell; Velibor Topic
- Cinematography: Carlos De Carvalho
- Edited by: Naysun Alae-Carew
- Music by: Al Hardiman; Patrick Jonsson
- Production company: Black Camel Pictures
- Distributed by: Entertainment One
- Release date: 27 June 2013 (EIFF)
- Running time: 87 minutes
- Country: United Kingdom
- Language: English

Outpost: Rise of the Spetsnaz, also known as Outpost 3, is a 2013 British science fiction horror war film and is the third and final entry in the Outpost film series. Unlike its predecessors Outpost and Outpost: Black Sun, Rise of the Spetsnaz was not directed by Steve Barker and was instead directed by Kieran Parker, who had served as a producer on both of the prior films. The film had its world premiere on 27 June 2013 at the Edinburgh International Film Festival. Rise of the Spetsnaz serves as a prequel to the series and is set during World War II and expands upon the creation of the invincible supernatural soldiers.

== Synopsis ==
The film begins with an old man drinking at a bar in the current era. He drops a Red Army medal into his glass and says "They who have been, will never be forgotten".

Back in March 1945, the Russian Red Army continues its drive towards Berlin. Russian commando Dolokhov leads a Red Guard reconnaissance squad through a stretch of forest, likely in German-occupied Bosnia, to search for a secret German camp, which a concerned Arkadi notes is not even marked on any captured German maps.

The Soviets wipe out a small convoy of Waffen-SS troops; the nearby SS 'Dog Unit' led by the SS-Hauptsturmführer kills a not-forthcoming Russian scout and begin a hunt using a rabid undead soldier as an attack/tracking dog. At the convoy, Voronin keeps watch as the rest search the vehicles where they discover bizarre medical files, a syringe, and strange human remains. A German Sd.Kfz. 251 halftrack arrives carrying more troopers, overwhelming and scattering the team. Voronin is cut down by the halftrack's machine gun and young Kostya is wounded; he and Araki are captured as the remaining Russians flee. Dolokhov, Osakin, Fyodor and Potrovsky split up to make them harder to track. Osakin hides but is killed by a grenade while Fyodor is shot and captured. Potrovsky provides sniper support for Dolokhov, killing several troopers but is attacked from the side by the reanimated German and ripped part. Finally captured, Dolokhov is brought to a bunker where screams and moans can be heard everywhere.

Imprisoned together with Arkadi, Fyodor, the three meet an American named Rogers. Arkadi notes that, despite the smell of death, there seems to be no rats. Rogers claims to be with the OSS and that the Germans are trying to create an army of reanimated corpses; he also claims to have extensive knowledge of the bunker's air ducts. Kostya, held in a separate cell, is attacked by an SS test subject; Arkadi and Dolokhov rush to his aid using a metal pipe and their boots to destroy the creature, but Kostya quickly dies of his wounds. SS-Standartenführer Strasser, leader of the project, sends in a second creature, a brute with skill in hand-to-hand combat that quickly kills Rogers and Arkadi, although Dolokhov manages to snap its neck. An impressed Strasser takes the two to a laboratory to demonstrate how he creates the creatures. He explains the serum that the Russians discovered activates cells in the body that prepare it for the effects of the Unified Field Machine from the previous films. A test subject is forced into the test chamber as the Germans fire up the machine: its effects causes some guards in the next room to vomit and the man's head to explode.

Fyodor is forced in next but survives with his strength dramatically increased: he manages to kill several Germans before being sedated. Dolokhov is put in a cell, but he jams the lock with one of the exploded man's teeth and later kicks the cell door open, knocks out two guards and steals a uniform. Stealthily killing several Germans, he finds a radio and attempts to contact his superiors but is unable to. Returning to the lab, he frees Fyodor, kills the bunker's chief surgeon, then injects a nurse with serum and seals her inside the test chamber turning her into one of the undead. The two men advance deeper into the bunker, killing numerous troopers. Taking the bunker elevator down to Level Six, Fyodor slowly begins to succumb to his treatment and begins to lose control of himself.

Strasser orders the cell doors on Level Six opened, unleashing numerous undead. Fyodor puts up a heroic fight to give Dolokhov time to escape but is overwhelmed and killed. The brute, reanimated once again, forces its way inside the elevator and, reaching the top, slaughters a large group of SS guards, but is riddled with bullets and weakened so Dolokhov finishes it off for good. He finally finds and confronts Strasser, killing him by puncturing the brain through the eye sockets with his thumbs. Using the air ducts, he reaches the surface and escapes but inadvertently sets off a tripwire flare. Dog Unit, seeing the flare, sets off in hot pursuit. Dolokhov knocks the reanimated corpse unconscious with a tree branch, then kills the SS Captain and the two remaining guards. Dolokhov then sets off back towards Russian lines, carrying the reanimated creature over his shoulder as proof of the German project for his superiors.

Back at the bar, the old man, revealed to be Dolokhov, repeats his statement from the beginning. A man enters and tries to coax Dolokhov into talking, showing him Hunt's notebook from the first movie and buying him drinks. The film concludes with Dolokhov and the man taking a shot together, as Dolokhov finishes by firmly setting his drink down on the table; the Red Army medal glimmers within it as the film ends.

== Cast ==
- Bryan Larkin as Dolokhov, A Soviet Red Guard Officer
- Iván Kamarás as Fyodor, The Squad's
- Michael McKell as SS Standartenführer Strasser, Head of Project Lazarus
- Velibor Topic as Arkadi, The Squad's Bear-Like Machine Gunner
- Laurence Possa as Osakin, A Red Guard Soldier
- Ben Lambert as Rogers, A Self-Proclaimed Office of Strategic Services infiltrator Captured by the Germans
- Alec Utgoff as Kostya, A Young Red Guard
- Vince Docherty as Corporal Klotz
- Gareth Morrison as Potrovsky, The Squad's Sniper
- Leo Horsfield as The Surgeon
- Vivien Taylor as The Nurse
- PJ Barnard as Nazi Officer
- Craig Smith and Steven Rae as Chess Players

== Production ==
While creating the film Parker chose to focus on the medical aspect of the zombie soldiers, whereas the previous two films took a more supernatural and mechanical approach. Exterior filming took place in Ripon, Yorkshire while interiors were shot on a stage near Glasgow, Scotland, and filming took place over a 28-day period.

== Reception ==
Critical reception for Rise of the Spetsnaz has been mixed. Dread Central panned the film. In contrast The List and Fangoria both gave more positive reviews for Rise of the Spetsnaz, and Fangoria wrote that "despite its flaws, RISE OF THE SPETSNAZ is still a fun watch, offering enough for action and horror fans alike. It's bloody and brutal while sleek and respectful of its place within the franchise, and sure to please fans of the first two films as well as the unfamiliar".
