= The Gambler (2014 film) =

2014 film

- Theatrical release poster
- Directed by: Rupert Wyatt
- Screenplay by: William Monahan
- Based on: The Gambler by James Toback
- Produced by: Irwin Winkler; Robert Chartoff; Mark Wahlberg; Stephen Levinson; David Winkler
- Starring: Mark Wahlberg; John Goodman; Brie Larson; Michael K. Williams; Jessica Lange
- Cinematography: Greig Fraser
- Edited by: Pete Beaudreau
- Music by: Theo Green; Jon Brion
- Production companies: Chartoff/Winkler Productions; Closest to the Hole Productions; Leverage Entertainment
- Distributed by: Paramount Pictures
- Release dates: November 10, 2014 (AFI Fest); December 25, 2014 (United States)
- Running time: 111 minutes
- Country: United States
- Language: English
- Budget: $25–31 million
- Box office: $39.3 million

The Gambler is a 2014 American crime drama film directed by Rupert Wyatt. The screenplay by William Monahan is based on the 1974 film The Gambler, written by James Toback, which, in turn, is based on Fyodor Dostoevsky's novel of the same name. The remake, starring Mark Wahlberg as the title character, premiered on November 10, 2014, at the AFI Fest, and was theatrically released by Paramount Pictures in the United States on December 25, 2014. It features the final film performance of George Kennedy before his death in 2016.

== Plot ==
Jim Bennett is a Los Angeles literatures professor who uses gambling as a way of self-destruction. He ends up owing $260,000 to Lee, the proprietor of an exclusive, high-stakes underground gambling ring, and another $50,000 to Neville Baraka, a loan shark. Lee gives Jim seven days to pay off his debts or be murdered.

During one of his classes, Jim begins an awkward discussion of literary excellence using Shakespeare as an example, arguing how almost all aspiring writers fail to accomplish literary excellence. He singles out exemplary athletes in his class for discussion, including Dexter, an emerging tennis star. Jim later confronts a collegiate basketball star, Lamar Allen, who pays no attention in class but intends to play in the NBA.

Jim expresses his extremist view on achieving excellence in one's field or vocation: if you cannot be exemplary, he reasons, then you might as well not try. He tells them that only Amy Phillips, a quiet student, is capable of a career in literature. He identifies her as a potential writing prodigy based on her work in his class, as well as having previously encountered her working secretly as a waitress at the underground gambling house. They develop a mutual interest in each other.

After class, Jim visits his mother Roberta at the family's luxury estate, but she says that she will not give him any more money. Jim considers borrowing money from Frank, another loan shark, to consolidate his debts and buy himself some time, but refuses to do so when Frank first demands Jim admit, "I am not a man."

Jim convinces Roberta to give him enough to pay off his debts, expressing no gratitude, then gambles it all away in a casino with Amy. Neville kidnaps Jim, has him tied up and tortured, confronting him with an ultimatum—convince Lamar to win his college basketball semifinal by seven points or less, or he will kill Amy.

Jim goes to Frank, who advises him to change his version of a "fuck you" attitude towards life by getting enough money to build a safe house and make reliable low yield investments for protection against his severe gambling losses. Frank lends him $260,000 to pay his debt to Lee but also threatens to kill everyone in Jim's personal life if he is not repaid. Lee's men assault Jim when he comes to ask Lee to stake him $150,000, saying the only way he can pay the full $410,000 debt to Lee and Frank is to gamble and win.

Jim uses the $150,000 to bribe Lamar into doing the point shaving. He sends Dexter to Las Vegas to bet on the game with the $260,000 he got from Frank. Lamar succeeds, so Jim uses his winnings to pay his debt to Neville, denying he knows anything about the large bet made in Vegas. Jim then convinces both Lee and Frank to meet him in a neutral gambling den, where he wagers enough money to pay both men off—if he wins—on a single roulette spin. Successful, he leaves the money at the club for Lee and Frank saying, "I am not a gambler."

The payment to Frank is more than he owed; Frank finds Jim and offers to give back the "cream", but to Frank's amusement, Jim responds "Fuck you." On an apparent adrenaline rush, Jim runs miles through the city to arrive at Amy's apartment; he is broke, but free from debt.

== Cast ==
- Mark Wahlberg as Jim Bennett
- John Goodman as Frank "Little Frank"
- Brie Larson as Amy Phillips
- Michael K. Williams as Neville Baraka
- Jessica Lange as Roberta
- Andre Braugher as Dean Fuller
- Anthony Kelley as Lamar Allen
- Alvin Ing as Lee
- Domenick Lombardozzi as Ernie "Big Ernie"
- Emory Cohen as Dexter
- Steve Park as "Two"
- Leland Orser as Larry
- George Kennedy as Ed
- Norman Towns as Brodey
- Richard Schiff as Jeweler
- Lauren Weedman as Banker
- Natalija Ugrina as Masseuse
- Amin Joseph as Neville's bookkeeper
- Da'Vone McDonald as Neville's muscle
- James Wellington as Indian Casino Dealer
- Jessika Van as Sports Bar Waitress

== Production ==
=== Development ===
In August 2011, Paramount Pictures announced a remake of the 1974 film The Gambler with the original producers, Irwin Winkler and Robert Chartoff. Intended as a directorial project for Martin Scorsese, it was reported that Leonardo DiCaprio was attached as the star and William Monahan would write the screenplay.

In a 2011 interview, screenwriter James Toback gave the autobiographical story of the original film's background and development, and criticized the idea of his film being remade.

Scorsese left the project and filmmaker Todd Phillips was in talks to take over as of August 2012. In September 2013, actor Mark Wahlberg and director Rupert Wyatt expressed interest in making the film.

=== Casting ===
By October 17, 2013, Brie Larson was in talks to play the female lead role, alongside Wahlberg. On January 15, 2014, Emory Cohen joined the cast of the film, playing one of the professor's students.

=== Filming ===
Shooting began on January 20, 2014. On February 3, 2014, Wahlberg was spotted on The Gambler set in Downtown Los Angeles. On March 13, there was a basketball scene filmed in Los Angeles.

=== Music ===
On September 8, 2014, it was announced that Jon Brion would be scoring the music for the film, while on October 27, Film Music Reporter revealed that Theo Green composed the score for the film. Republic Records released a soundtrack album for the film on December 16, which features songs from various artists.

== Release ==
The Gambler had its world premiere during the 2014 AFI Fest at the Dolby Theatre in Los Angeles on November 10. Paramount previously set the film for a limited release in the United States on December 19, 2014, for an Oscar-qualifying run strategy, and planned to expand the film on January 1, 2015. But on December 5, Paramount announced the film would be released wide in cinemas on December 25, 2014, instead of the previous platform release plans.

On October 22, 2014, the first teaser poster and red band trailer were released. On November 5, 2014, the green band trailer was released.

== Reception ==
On Rotten Tomatoes, the film has an approval rating of 43% based on 142 reviews, with an average rating of 5.5/10. The website's critics consensus reads: "Well-paced and reasonably entertaining in its own right, The Gambler still suffers from comparisons to the James Caan classic that inspired it." On Metacritic, the film has a weighted average score of 55 out of 100, based on reviews from 40 critics, indicating "mixed or average reviews". Audiences surveyed by CinemaScore gave the film a grade C+ on scale of A to F.

Bilge Ebiri of Vulture wrote: "Wahlberg grows into the part. He may not be right as a precocious, self-loathing intellectual, but he's very much at home playing a dickhead who's gotten in too deep. And as The Gambler becomes less about its protagonist's dashed intellectualism and more about the gathering danger of his predicament, the film gains power." Todd McCarthy of The Hollywood Reporter called it a slick and efficient remake, and "In nearly every scene, Wahlberg carries off the central role with what could be called determined elan." Peter Travers of Rolling Stone gave the film two out of four stars, saying: "Wyatt keeps the action coming at a fast clip, but watching Jim repeatedly pursue a path of self-destruction for reasons never made clear grows wearying."

Jessica Lange's performance has received critical acclaim. TheWrap wrote that Lange had one of her "meatiest film roles in ages." The Huffington Post described her performance as "ferocious" and capable of "knocking down William Monahan's profanity laced dialogue with gleeful abandon" Also, the Boston Herald described her work as "strikingly memorable", which Newsday, The Philadelphia Inquirer, and Indiewire have agreed with, terming her "affecting", "stirring", and "terrific". James Berardinelli from ReelViews described her as "heartbreaking as the cold, rich widow who blames herself on some level for her son's failure." Chris Nashawaty from Entertainment Weekly lauded her acting as effortless by saying "[she] can do icy in her sleep..." Rex Reed from The New York Observer described her performance as "hard" and "venomous". Peter Travers described her performance as "reliably superb". Jeff Baker from The Oregonian stated that her acting is "fierce". Indiewire suggested Lange as a contender for the Academy Award for Best Supporting Actress.
