= Legacy (2010 film) =

- Legacy
- Directed by: Thomas Ikimi
- Written by: Thomas Ikimi
- Produced by: Thomas Ikimi; Amrit Walia; Idris Elba; Jessica Levick; Arabella Page Croft; Kieran Parker
- Starring: Idris Elba; William Hope
- Release date: 28 February 2010 (Glasgow Film Festival)
- Country: United Kingdom
- Language: English

Legacy (also known as Legacy: Black Ops) is a 2010 psychological thriller film directed by Nigerian/British director Thomas Ikimi and produced by Black Camel Pictures. The film premiered at the Glasgow Film Festival on 28 February 2010 and was released theatrically in the United States on 15 October 2010. The film stars Idris Elba from The Wire (who was also executive producer with Amrit Walia), William Hope, Eamonn Walker and Richard Brake among others.

== Plot synopsis ==
The story follows Malcolm Gray (Elba) taking sanctuary in a Brooklyn motel room as his mind slowly unravels. He deals with the repercussions over his past and the rise of his brother Darnell (Walker), a ruthless senator, bent on getting into the White House. It becomes clear that all may not be as it seems.

== Cast ==
- Idris Elba as Malcolm Gray
- William Hope as Mark Star
- Eamonn Walker as Darnell Gray Jr
- Monique Gabriela Curnen as Valentina Gray
- Richard Brake as Scott O'Keefe
- Clarke Peters as Ola Adenuga
- Julian Wadham as Gregor Salenko
- Gerald Kyd as Gustavo Helguerra
- Mem Ferda as Andriy
- Niall Greig Fulton as Vladimir
- John Kazek as Dimitri
- Annette Badland as Stephanie Gumpel
- Lara Pulver as Diane Shaw
- Joe Holt as Ronny Tarbuck
- Deobia Oparei as Ray Cloglamm
- Juliet Howland as Anne
- Christina Chong as Jane
- Michael Alspaugh as Carl
- Michael Callaghan as Mikhail
- Finlay Harris as Darnell's supporter
- Adam Smith as Rescue Worker

== Production ==
Director Thomas Ikimi stated at the premiere that, unable to find funding for the film in the UK, he went to Nigeria and was given funding based purely on the fact that he was a Nigerian director rather than on the script itself. He also apologized to the crew for his bad mood throughout filming due to the tightness of the budget and timetable.

The film was completed on the morning of the premiere (28 February 2010), and filmed entirely in Scotland despite being set in Brooklyn.

== Reception ==
Xan Brooks of The Guardian gave the film two out of five stars, saying "it feels like a one-act play that dreamed it was a first-person shooter game."
