= Ghostboat =

2006 British television series

- Genre: Drama; Mystery; Thriller
- Written by: Neal R. Burger; Guy Burt; George E. Simpson
- Directed by: Stuart Orme
- Starring: David Jason
- Theme music composer: Colin Towns
- Country of origin: United Kingdom
- Original language: English
- No. of series: 1
- No. of episodes: 2

Production
- Executive producers: David Jason; David Reynolds
- Producer: David Reynolds
- Editor: David Aspinall
- Running time: 133 minutes
- Production companies: Yorkshire Television; The Paperback Company Films

Original release
- Network: ITV
- Release: 9 April – 10 April 2006

Ghostboat is a 2006 British television film, based on a novel by George E. Simpson and Neal R. Burger. The film features David Jason as its star. It is a fantasy tale of His Majesty's Submarine Scorpion vanishing during the Second World War, leaving only one crew member (David Jason) surviving. 38 years later, in the Cold War year 1981, the Scorpion reappears; the crew have disappeared, but the vessel is otherwise unchanged and has not aged in the intervening years. A Royal Navy crew along with the sole survivor of the original voyage is given the mission of retracing the last days of the boat prior to her 1943 disappearance. A supernatural influence takes hold of most of the crew, and they start showing characteristics of the old crew. They find themselves fighting Second World War ghosts.

== Plot ==
HMS Scorpion, a British submarine that had gone missing in the Baltic Sea during the Second World War, surfaces in the path of a Soviet freighter in 1981. The Soviets return the vessel to the British. Naval Intelligence is interested in the case because it seems that, for the first time, a ship has returned from "the Devil's Triangle of the North". The submarine opens her own hatch to let the investigating team in, where they find the vessel in a state of perfect preservation, but find no sign of the crew.

Jack Hardy, the only surviving member of the original crew, had been rescued in 1943 by members of the German Kriegsmarine but has no memory of the last days of the 1943 mission. He and Alan Cassidy, one of the vessel's designers, join a Royal Navy crew on a mission to retrace Scorpion's last days before she went missing. Commander Travis, a naval intelligence officer, is in charge of the mission while Captain Byrnes captains the submarine. The mission will take the submarine into Soviet waters while a ship, HMS Oakland, escorts the boat. Once in the Baltic, the crew begins to take on the personalities and identities of the dead crew and the boat takes a degree of control over herself. Contact with Oakland is soon lost.

A "Soviet submarine" is detected and through communication error the crew destroys her with torpedoes. Scorpion surfaces to search for survivors but, impossibly no debris is found. Hardy realises that the "Soviet submarine" was destroyed at the same place and time where the Scorpion sank a German U-boat in 1943 and speculates that "the past is breaking through". Cassidy, who had supervised the fitting of the Scorpion with practice torpedoes, finds that they have become live weapons. Captain Byrnes tries to abort the mission but Commander Travis convinces him to continue. Hardy learns that the real mission is to discover and exploit the power that preserved and delivered the Scorpion.

Three aircraft detected on radar whilst Scorpion is surfaced are identified as Second World War Luftwaffe fighters. Travis pulls out a gun and orders a disbelieving Byrnes below at gunpoint, but Byrnes is killed when the fighters strafe the boat. Travis takes command. Cassidy and Hardy find no bullet damage on the deck or tower from the strafing attack and conclude Travis may have shot the captain to preserve the mission.

Travis apparently becomes possessed by the former captain. The original submarine captain's intent had been to torpedo ships of the German fleet in Königsberg harbour (now the Soviet city of Kaliningrad). Modern Soviet officers detect the vessel and begin preparations for a nuclear war. Hardy manages to get the crew off the boat before she can attack the Soviet fleet but Travis and the submarine, essentially as one entity, continue the attack. Hardy rewires the torpedo control system, causing the torpedoes to explode in the torpedo tubes. The explosion kills Travis, and causes the vessel to sink. Hardy is shot in the process. Hardy dies on his bunk, clutching a picture of his wife as the water engulfs him.

Six months later, the Soviets find the sunken Scorpion and she looks like she has been decaying for forty years. Neither Hardy's nor Travis' bodies are found. The Soviets close their investigation of the incident. British intelligence intercepts the Soviet report, leading British military authorities to also close their files on the case. The British Admiral says "There was no Kaliningrad incident; it never happened. The Scorpion sank in 1943".

== Cast ==
- David Jason as Jack Hardy
- Ian Puleston-Davies as Travis
- Tony Haygarth as Alan Cassidy
- Julian Wadham as Captain Nathan Byrnes
- James Laurenson as Admiral Nealy
- Robert Whitelock as Spender
- Crispin Bonham-Carter as Redding
- Jamie Martin as Tyler
- Roger Evans as Monroe
- Jonathan Cullen as Captain Basquine
- Alan Stocks as Peterson
- Lee Whitlock as Reeves
- Mark Callum as Callum
- Max Bollinger as Soviet Naval Captain
- David Nellist as 1943 Crewman
- Robert Horwell as Mason

== Production ==
The film was announced in August 2005. David Jason was enthralled by the book Ghostboat and adapting it was a long-held wish of his. The drama aired as two 90-minute episodes. It was one of the most expensive dramas ever made by ITV. The submarine used in filming is the non-diving replica, built in Malta as the 'modified' S-33 for the film U-571, also shot in Malta. The replica is still afloat, moored in Marsa in the inner part of the Grand Harbour.

== Film versus novel ==
The 1972 book Ghostboat was set in 1974, and revolved around the re-appearance of the Pacific Fleet class Submarine 284 USS Candlefish, thirty years after she disappeared in the Devil's Sea in the Pacific off the Kuriles, toward Japan. The Candlefish surfaces in the path of a Japanese freighter 600 mi (970 km) northwest of Pearl Harbor. The characters and their names remain basically the same (e.g. Alan Cassidy is Walter Cassidy, Travis is Frank Crook) and the mission to re-trace the last days of the Candlefish has no undercurrent of intrigue.

In the original story Candlefish fell through a Geo-magnetic Anomaly (GMA), one of ten, five in the Northern Hemisphere, five in the Southern; and surfaced in the middle of another. The plot is concerned not so much with how the submarine came back, but why she came back.

The final mission of the Candlefish was changed by her captain, to an unplanned entry to Tokyo Bay, in an attempt to sink anything Japanese, and thus acquire a higher figure for tonnage sunk. This falls rapidly apart as the Candlefish sinks, with one survivor – Jack Hardy – injured and washed overboard from the conning tower. As the story concludes, Candlefish risks being unleashed on an unsuspecting Japan in 1974.

== Reception ==
The film received a score of 6.5/10 on Internet Movie Database.

== Award nominations ==
Ghostboat was nominated for the 2006 RTS Television Award for Best Sound - Drama.

== DVD release ==
Ghostboat was released on DVD on 15 January 2007, nine months after its first showing on ITV on 9 April 2006.
