= Richard Brake =

Welsh-American actor (born 1964)

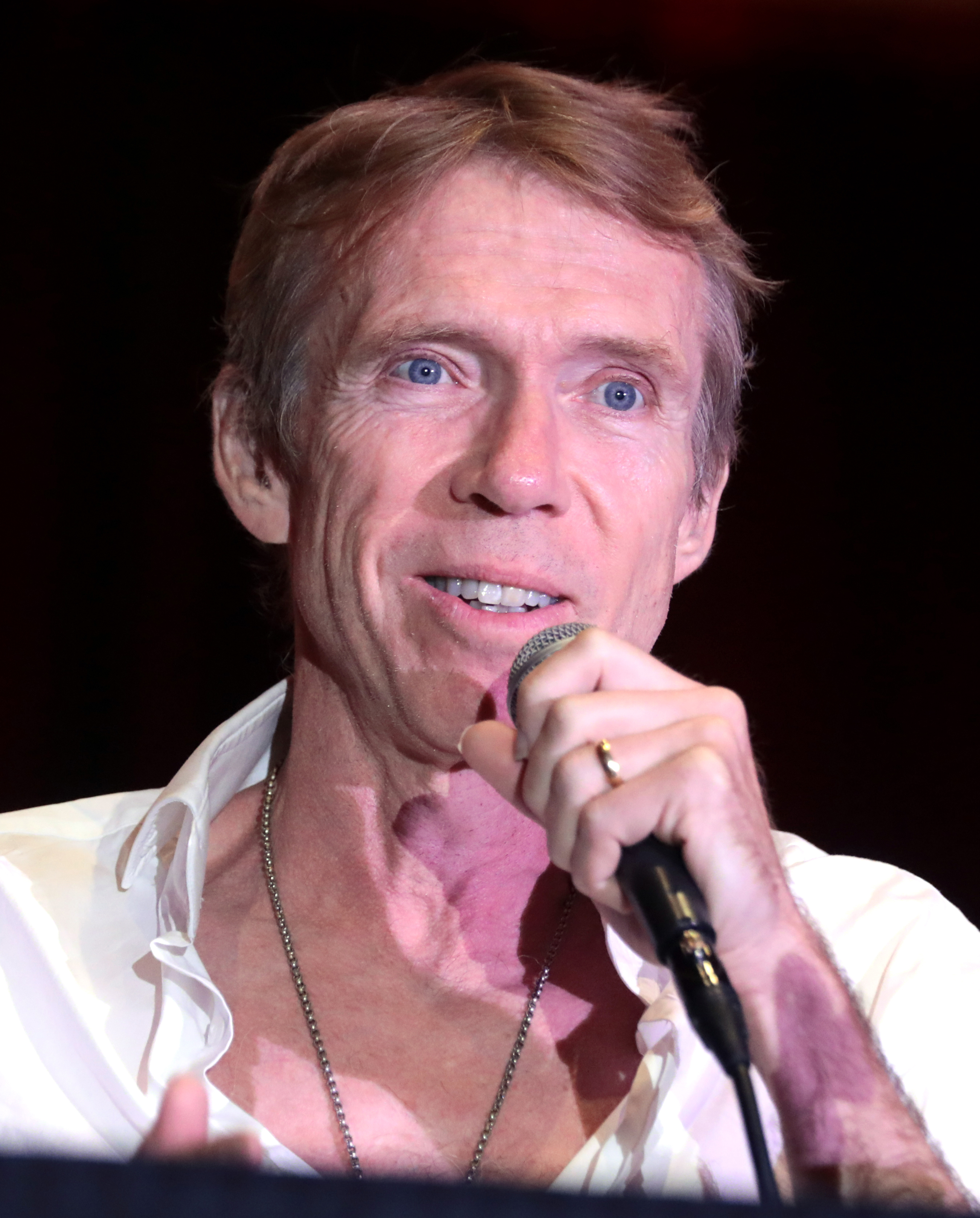
- Brake in July 2023
- Born: Richard Colin Brake; 30 November 1964 (age 61); Ystrad Mynach, Wales
- Citizenship: United Kingdom; United States
- Education: Western Reserve Academy
- Alma mater: Duke University
- Occupation: Actor
- Years active: 1993–present

Richard Colin Brake (born 30 November 1964) is a Welsh and American actor. Following his film debut in Death Machine (1994), Brake had a supporting role as Joe Chill in Batman Begins (2005). He subsequently appeared in numerous horror films such as Doom (2005), Hannibal Rising (2007), Mandy (2018), and Barbarian (2022), as well as his first lead role in Perfect Skin (2018). A frequent collaborator of Rob Zombie, Brake has appeared in four of his films: Halloween II (2009), 31 (2016), 3 from Hell (2019), and The Munsters (2022).

Brake is best known for his recurring roles as the Night King on the fourth and fifth seasons of the HBO fantasy drama series Game of Thrones (2014–15), Vlad on the fourth season of the Showtime crime drama series Ray Donovan (2016), and Merle Callahan on the third season of the Paramount+ crime thriller series Mayor of Kingstown (2024–present). He is also known for his lead role as Conrad Harlow on the first season of the Amazon Prime Video crime thriller series Absentia (2017).

== Early life ==
Brake was born on 30 November 1964 in Ystrad Mynach, Wales. In 1967, he and his family immigrated to the United States, where they first settled in Atlanta. He then grew up in the states of North Carolina, Tennessee, and Ohio, attending Western Reserve Academy in Hudson, Ohio, and Duke University in Durham, North Carolina. Brake studied acting under Sam Kogan, at his Academy of the Science of Acting and Directing in London, and Beatrice Straight, at the Michael Chekhov Studio in New York City. Despite growing up in the United States, Brake still considers himself Welsh.

== Career ==
In 1993, he made his screen acting debut as a reporter on an episode of the British comedy series Jeeves and Wooster. In 1994, Brake and actress Rachel Weisz both made their film debuts in the science-fiction horror film Death Machine, which starred Brad Dourif. Following supporting roles in a few low-budget films (including Subterfuge, co-starring Matt McColm), Brake did not appear in a single film until six years later when he landed his first role by a major film distributor in Anthony Minghella's civil war film Cold Mountain. He played the leader of a group of Union foragers who attempts to rape the young widow Sara (played by Natalie Portman). The film was released on Christmas Day 2003 and was a critical and commercial success, receiving seven Academy Award nominations.

In 2005, Brake finally achieved recognition from mainstream audiences in Christopher Nolan's Batman Begins. He played Joe Chill, the man responsible for murdering the parents of Bruce Wayne. Brake appeared as the warped and perverted space Marine Dean Portman in Doom, a live action adaptation of the video game series, with Karl Urban and Dwayne Johnson. He appeared as a hostile American man in Steven Spielberg's Munich, a cinematic retelling of the Munich massacre in the midst of the 1972 Olympic Games. In that same year, Brake also provided the voicework in the video game Juiced as T. K., the leader of the Urban Maulerz crew.

In 2006, Brake appeared in the music video for Muse's Knights of Cydonia, playing a villainous sheriff in a strange futuristic western. Brake played paroled convict Bobby DeWitt in Brian De Palma's The Black Dahlia, a fictional account of the murder of actress Elizabeth Short. Despite being a critical and commercial failure, the film received a nomination for the Academy Award for Best Cinematography, losing to Pan's Labyrinth. In 2007, he had a supporting role in Hannibal Rising, which was based on the 2006 novel of the same name by Thomas Harris. He played Enrikas Dortlich, one of the war criminals who murders Mischa Lecter, the younger sister of psychiatrist-turned-cannibalistic killer Hannibal Lecter (played by Gaspard Ulliel) .

In 2008, he played ex-Marine Prior in the horror film Outpost. In 2009, following a guest appearance on the crime drama Cold Case and a supporting role as the titular character in Perkins' 14, he appeared in Rob Zombie's Halloween II, the sequel to his remake of Halloween. He plays Gary Scott, a sleazy and perverted coroner who is brutally decapitated by Michael Myers following a car crash that kills his co-worker. Brake garnered the role based on a personal recommendation to Zombie from actor Sid Haig. Brake made a cameo in the thriller Cuckoo, which premiered at the Cambridge Film Festival on 25 September 2009.

In 2010, he co-starred with Idris Elba in the psychological thriller Legacy, which premiered at the Glasgow Film Festival on 28 February 2010. In 2011, he co-starred with Reese Witherspoon and Robert Pattinson in the romantic drama Water for Elephants, which was based on Sara Gruen's 2006 novel of the same name. The film was released on 22 April 2011, to positive reviews. Brake played Harry Green in the horror film The Incident, where he doesn't have any spoken dialogue throughout the film. The film had its world premiere at the Toronto International Film Festival on 12 September 2011, where it was nominated for the Midnight Madness Award.

In 2013, he had supporting roles in the action thriller The Numbers Station starring John Cusack and Malin Åkerman, and Ridley Scott's crime thriller The Counselor, starring Michael Fassbender and Penélope Cruz. Brake appeared in the superhero film Thor: The Dark World, the sequel to Thor. The film became the biggest commercial success for Brake's career, earning $644.6 million at the box office worldwide. Brake had a recurring role as mobster Terry Mandel on Frank Darabont's neo-noir crime drama Mob City. In 2014, he made guest appearances on the crime drama Crossing Lines and the action thriller series Transporter: The Series, both roles he played were international criminals wanted for murder.

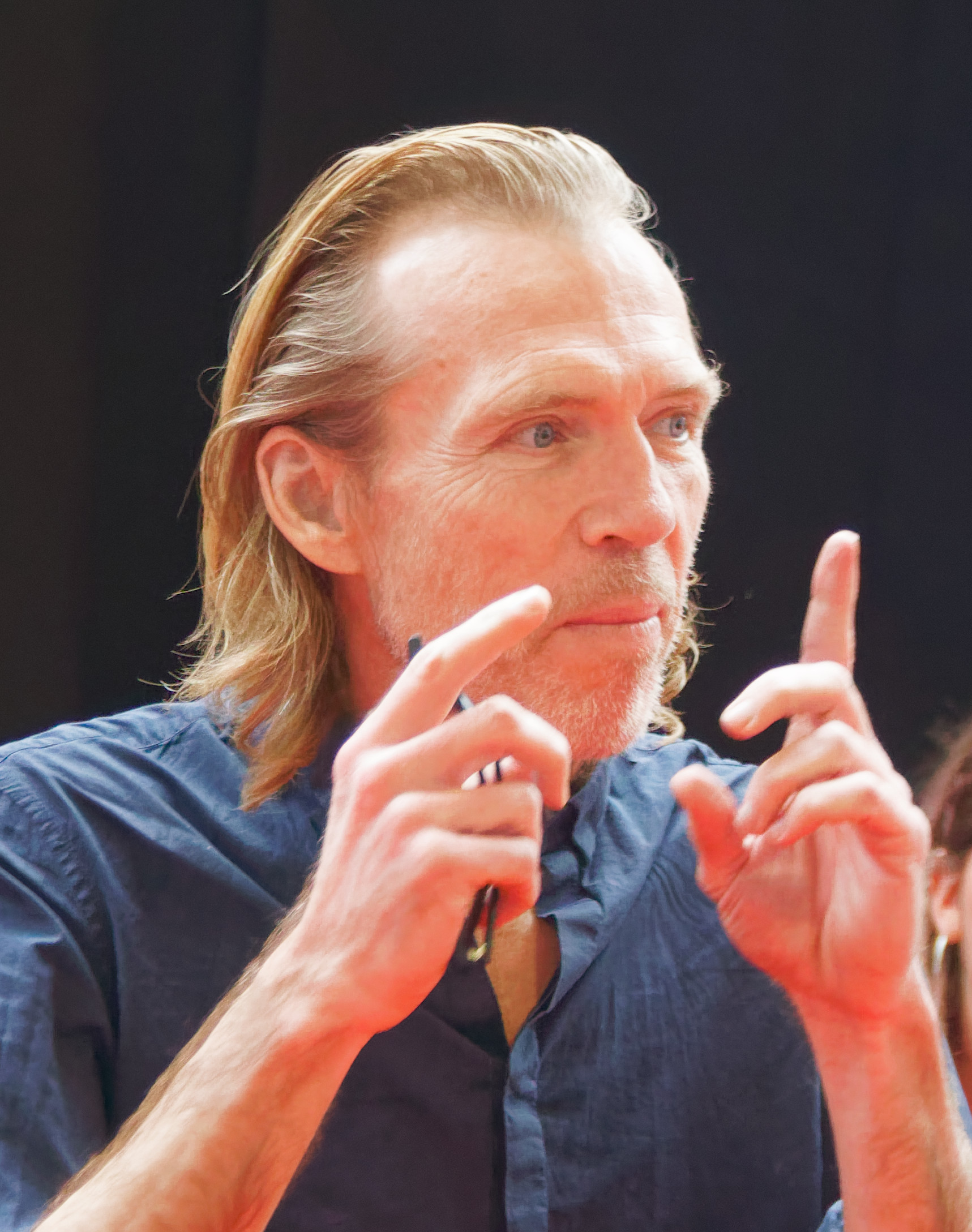
Brake at the 2018 Comic Con Brussels

From 2014 to 2015, Brake portrayed the Night King on the HBO fantasy series Game of Thrones, appearing in the show's fourth and fifth seasons, most notably in the fifth-season episode "Hardhome", which received seven Emmy nominations. Brake appeared in the action comedy Kingsman: The Secret Service, where he plays an unnamed man who interrogates Eggsy Unwin (played by Taron Egerton) character as part of his training to become a spy for the intelligence agency Kingsman. He made an appearance as a bar patron in the semi-biographical drama Set Fire to the Stars, which premiered at the Edinburgh International Film Festival on 23 June 2014.

In 2015, he appeared on the FX historical fiction drama The Bastard Executioner as Baron Edwin Pryce. Due to scheduling conflicts with The Bastard Executioner, Brake was unable to reprise as The Night King for the sixth season of Game of Thrones and was replaced by Vladimir Furdik, one of the shows main stunt performers. Brake guest-starred on an episode of Grimm as a hunter with a penchant for severing a foot from his victims. He co-starred with Melissa McCarthy and Jason Statham in the action comedy Spy, where he played Solsa Dudaev, a Chechen terrorist in pursuit of a nuclear weapon. The film was universally praised and was nominated for the Golden Globe Award for Best Motion Picture – Musical or Comedy.

Throughout 2016, Brake made guest appearances on several award-winning television shows such as Hawaii Five-0 and Peaky Blinders. He also had a recurring role as Russian mobster Vlad on the Showtime series Ray Donovan. In 2016, he starred as the main antagonist in Rob Zombie's slasher horror film 31. He played Doom-Head, a contract killer who participates in the annual titular game by murdering a group of victims who are kidnapped by goons. The film had its world premiere at the Sundance Film Festival on 23 January 2016. Despite mixed reviews from critics, Brake received enormous praise for his performance and was nominated for the Fangoria Chainsaw Award for Best Supporting Actor, losing to Stephen Lang for Don't Breathe.

In 2017, Brake appeared as Medved in Bitter Harvest and as Tarasov in The Death of Stalin. Although both films focused on Soviet revolutionary and dictator Joseph Stalin, the former was more preoccupied with the Holodomor. While the former was panned by critics, the latter received widespread praise. Brake had a recurring role on the crime thriller series Absentia as Conrad Harlow, a wealthy banker who is released from prison after FBI agent Emily Byrne (played by Stana Katic), who was hunting him down for the murders of several women, is found alive.

In 2018, he got his first lead role in the psychological horror-thriller Perfect Skin, which premiered at Frightfest London on 25 August 2018. He played Bob Reid, a tattoo artist who, after the dissolution of his marriage as a result of being diagnosed with Parkinson's, kidnaps a Polish immigrant and tattoos her body in attempt to create one last piece of art before he dies. Brake's performance was critically acclaimed and was regarded as the best of his career. He subsequently won the Best Actor award at the First Glance Film Festival and the Vancouver Badass Film Festival for his performance.

Brake co-starred in the horror film Mandy, which premiered at the Sundance Film Festival on 19 January 2018. He later appeared as Rex in the western The Sisters Brothers. The film had its world premiere at the Venice Film Festival on 2 September. In 2019, he portrayed Winslow Foxworth Coltrane in the horror film 3 from Hell. He also co-starred in the thriller film The Rhythm Section, which was released on 31 January 2020. He played Valin Hess, an Imperial officer, in the seventh episode of the second season of The Mandalorian.

== Personal life ==
Brake has two children from a previous marriage.

== Filmography ==
=== Film ===
Year	Title	Role	Notes
1994	Death Machine	Scott Ridley	
1996	Subterfuge	Pierce Tencil	
1996	Virtual Terror	Steve Baker	
1997	Deus Volt	Bishop Von Match	
2003	Cold Mountain	Nym	
2005	Batman Begins	Joe Chill	
2005	Doom	Corporal Dean Portman	
2005	Munich	Belligerent American	
2005	Soul Searcher	Van Bueren	
2006	The Black Dahlia	Bobby DeWitt	
2007	Hannibal Rising	Enrikas Dortlich	
2007	Retribution	Masters	
2008	Outpost	Prior	
2009	Cuckoo	Lone Wolf	
2009	Halloween II	Gary Scott	
2009	Perkins' 14	Ronald Perkins	
2010	Legacy	Scott O'Keefe	
2011	Detention	Mr. Nolan	
2011	Good Day for It	Norman Tyrus	
2011	The Incident	Harry Green	
2011	Water for Elephants	Grady	
2013	The Counselor	Second Man	
2013	The Numbers Station	Max	
2013	Thor: The Dark World	Einherjar Captain	
2014	Kingsman: The Secret Service	The Interrogator	
2014	Set Fire to the Stars	Mr. Unlucky	
2015	Spy	Solsa Dudaev	
2015	The Cannibal in the Jungle	Dr. Timothy Darrow	
2015	The Chameleon	Detective Brady	
2016	31	Doom-Head	
2017	Bitter Harvest	Medved	
2017	The Death of Stalin	NKVD Officer Tarasov	
2018	Mandy	The Chemist	
2018	Perfect Skin	Bob Reid	
2018	The Sisters Brothers	Rex	
2019	3 from Hell	Winslow Foxworth Coltrane	
2019	Feedback	Brennan	
2019	The Dare	Credence	
2020	The Rhythm Section	Lehmans	
2020	Arthur & Merlin: Knights of Camelot	Merlin	Direct-to-video
2020	Tremors: Shrieker Island	Bill	
2021	The Virtuoso	Handsome Johnnie	
2021	Bingo Hell	Mr. Big	
2022	Barbarian	Frank	
2022	Offseason	Bridge Man	
2022	Vesper	Darius	
2022	The Munsters	Dr. Henry Augustus Wolfgang, Orlock	
2022	R.I.P.D. 2: Rise of the Damned	Otis Clairborne / Astaroth	
2023	The Gates	William Colcott	
2023	The Last Stop in Yuma County	Beau	
2023	Lore	Darwin	
2023	Hammarskjöld	Hunter	
2024	Altered	Frank Kessler	
2024	The Strangers: Chapter 1	Sheriff Howard Rotter	
2025	Sisu: Road to Revenge	KGB Officer	
2025	The Strangers – Chapter 2	Sheriff Howard Rotter	
2026	The Strangers – Chapter 3	Sheriff Howard Rotter	
2026	Cold Storage	Jerabek	
2026	Pinocchio Unstrung	Geppetto	

=== Television ===
Year	Title	Role	Notes
1993	Jeeves and Wooster	Reporter	Episode: "Lady Florence Craye Arrives in New York (or, the Once and Future Ex)"
2004	Keen Eddie	"Dutch" Mike Vanderlay	Episode: "Sticky Fingers"
2009	Cold Case	Rich Kiesel	Episode: "Mind Games"
2009	M.I. High	Georgi	Episode: "Family Tree"
2009	NCIS: Los Angeles	John Bordinay	Episode: "Ambush"
2010	The Deep	McIndoe	3 episodes
2011	Above Suspicion	Joseph Marshall / Alexander Fitzpatrick	3 episodes
2013	Mob City	Terry Mandel	5 episodes
2014	Crossing Lines	Alexander Fuster / Winston Smith	Episode: "The Kill Zone"
2014	The Assets	Agent Waters	Episode: "Trip to Vienna"
2014	Transporter: The Series	Dezdu Magyar	Episode: "2B or Not 2B"
2014–15	Game of Thrones	Night King	2 episodes
2015	Grimm	Nigel Edmund	Episode: "Bad Luck"
2015	Obsession: Dark Desires	Dale	Episode: "Apocalypse Now"
2015	The Bastard Executioner	Baron Edwin Pryce	3 episodes
2016	Barbarians Rising	Geiseric	Episode: "Ruin"
2016	Beowulf: Return to the Shieldlands	Arak	Episode 8
2016	Hawaii Five-0	Henry Garavito	Episode: "Ka Pono Ku'oko'a" (The Cost of Freedom)
2016	Peaky Blinders	Anton Kaledin	Episode 1
2016	Ray Donovan	Vlad	4 episodes
2017	Absentia	Conrad Harlow	Main role (Season 1)
2017	Eight Days That Made Rome	Seneca	Episode: "The Downfall of Nero"
2017	Supernatural	Luther Shrike	Episode: "The Scorpion and the Frog"
2018	Patrick Melrose	Mark	Episode: "Bad News"
2018	The Royals	Earl Frost	5 episodes
2019	Creeped Out	The Hidden	Episode: "No Filter"
2019	Sanctuary	Carol	6 episodes
2020	Brave New World	Pope	2 episodes
2020	Cursed	Brother Theophilius	2 episodes
2020	The Mandalorian	Valin Hess	Episode: "Chapter 15: The Believer"
2021	Exterminate All the Brutes	General	Episode: "The Bright Colors of Fascism"
2024–2025	Mayor of Kingstown	Merle Callahan	10 episodes

=== Video games ===
Year	Title	Role	Notes
2005	Juiced	T. K.	Voice
2023	The Isle Tide Hotel	The Receptionist	Interactive film
2025	Vampire: The Masquerade – Bloodlines 2	Willem Axel	Voice
TBA	Squadron 42	Wounded miner	Voice, post-production

=== Music video ===
Year	Title	Artist	Notes
2006	Knights of Cydonia	Muse	Played the role of Sheriff Baron Klaus Rottingham

=== Short film ===
Year	Title	Role	Notes
2008	The Tonto Woman	John Isham	
2011	The Sweethearts	Landlord	

== Awards and nominations ==
Year	Award	Category	Nominated work	Result
2016	British Independent Film Festival	Best Supporting Actor	The Chameleon	Nominated
2016	Sydney Indie Film Festival	Best Supporting Male	The Chameleon	Nominated
2017	BloodGuts UK Horror Awards	Best Actor	31	Nominated
2017	Fangoria Chainsaw Awards	Best Supporting Actor	31	Nominated
2017	Fright Meter Awards	Best Supporting Actor	31	Won
2019	First Glance Film Festival Los Angeles	Best Actor – Feature Film	Perfect Skin	Won
2019	Vancouver Badass Film Festival	Best Actor	Perfect Skin	Won
