= Black Camel Pictures =

Film production company

- Industry: Film production
- Founders: Arabella Page Croft; Kieran Parker
- Headquarters: Glasgow, Scotland
- Website: blackcamel.co.uk

Black Camel Pictures is a production company based in Glasgow and founded by Arabella Page Croft and Kieran Parker.

== Overview ==
Their first feature film was zombie horror, Outpost, shot on a very small budget. It was commended on achieving "smart shocks and stylistic flourishes" and helped establish the company for future projects.

In 2009, Black Camel produced their second feature, the psychological thriller, Legacy starring Idris Elba. Following an appearance as the Closing Gala film at the Glasgow Film Festival the Tribeca Film Festival and the Little Rock Film Festival the film was awarded The Grand Jury Prize at the 14th Annual American Black Film Festival in Miami.

Having mortgaged their £200,000 home in Glasgow to finance production for Outpost, they went on to produce 2 more Outpost films with Outpost: Black Sun (2012) and Outpost: Rise of the Spetsnaz (2013).

2013 also saw a theatrical release of Sunshine on Leith a feature film version of Stephen Greenhorn's original Dundee Repertory Theatre stage play. Sunshine was directed by Dexter Fletcher (Rocket Man) and produced alongside Andrew MacDonald and Alon Reich of DNA Films. The film was well received as upbeat and enjoyable with critic Mark Kermode stating 'I shed a tear within the first 10 minutes, and spent the rest of the movie beaming like a gibbering, love-struck fool.' in the Guardian newspaper and Robbie Collin in The Daily Telegraph saying the film 'leaves you with cask-strength, capillary-reddening tingles of happiness that run to the very tip of your nose.'

In 2014, Black Camel Co-Produced Castles in the Sky alongside Hero Productions for the BBC. The film is a dramatised telling of the true story of Robert Watson-Watt and other British scientists' struggle to invent radar in the years leading to World War II. It was directed by Gilles Mackinnon and stars Eddie Izzard and Laura Fraser.

In 2018, filming wrapped on Marionette a psychological thriller about a therapist, who loses her grip on reality when a ten-year-old boy claims he can control her future. The film stars Thekla Reuten and Peter Mullan and was directed by Elbert van Strien. It was a co-production between Black Camel and Samsa Films shot in Luxembourg and Aberdeen.

Also wrapped in 2018 was Dead End 2 the second instalment in the Dead End short film trilogy. Black Camel Pictures continue to serve as executive producers with a third film recently completing the series.

Filming for Off the Rails started in February 2019 filming in Palma, Mallorca. The film tells the story of three women going interailing in their 50s after a close friend dies leaving them with tickets and a final request, to take her 17-year-old daughter with them. The film is based on the real-life experiences of director Jules Williamson and stars Kelly Preston, Jenny Seagrove, Sally Phillips, Judi Dench with Elizabeth Dormer-Phillips. The story was originated by Jules and Arabella Page Croft with script written by Jordan Waller.

In 2019, Black Camel also produced two short films for the BBC iplayer. Float was directed by Black Camel's Arabella Page Croft and Pancake by Siri Rodnes Float was commissioned to go to a 5 part series for the BBC iplayer and was first streamed in August 2021.

Filming for Falling for Figaro started in December 2019 in Glasgow and the highlands of Scotland. Figaro is a feature-length romantic comedy set in the world of Opera and was directed by Ben Lewin (The Sessions) starring Danielle MacDonald, Hugh Skinner, Shazad Latif and Joanna Lumley

In 2020, Black Camel Pictures started work with Wild Child Animation on their first animated series The Brilliant World of Tom Gates based on the books of the same name by Liz Pichon. The commission from SKY Television was to Produce a 20-part animated TV show which was released in January 2021. May 2021 saw the start of production on Season 2 with a further 20 episodes for Sky and October 2022, the release of a Halloween special.

January 2021 also saw shooting commence on Annika, a six-part television drama for UKTV and WGBH. Annika stars Nicola Walker, Jamie Sives, Katie Leung, Ukweli Roach, and is based on the radio 4 series Annika Stranded by Nick Walker. Annika was initially broadcast in the UK in August 2021 and has gone on to break records and become Alibi's most-watched drama for at least seven years. The broadcast of the first episode of the series attracted 410,000 'live' viewers which was 2.5 percent of the audience share and went on to averaged 1.3m viewers per episode. That makes it the highest-rated programme since the Broadcasters' Audience Research Board (BARB) started recording figures in January 2014. August 2022 saw the start of principal photography on season 2 which was to be released in August 2023.

Most recently, the company had signed a first-look deal with All3Media International for the development of film and television projects.

== Company filmography ==
=== Released ===
- Outpost (2008)
- Legacy (2009)
- Outpost: Black Sun (2012)
- Sunshine on Leith (2013)
- Outpost: Rise of the Spetsnaz (2013)
- Castles in the Sky (2015)
- Anna and the Apocalypse (2017)
- Dead End (2017)
- Dead End 2 (2018)
- Dead End 3 (2019)
- Float (2019) Pilot – BBC iplayer
- Pancake (2019) Pilot – BBC iplayer
- Marionette (2019)
- Falling for Figaro (2020)
- Float (2020) – Series – BBC iplayer
- The Brilliant World of Tom Gates (2020)
- Off the Rails (2021)
- Annika (2021)
- The Brilliant World of Tom Gates – series 2 – 2021
- Annika – series 2 – 2023
- The Brilliant World of Tom Gates – series 3 – 2023
- Float Series II (2023) – Series – BBC iplayer
- An t-Eilean (2025)
- Gifted (2025)
