= Outpost (2008 film) =

- Theatrical poster
- Directed by: Steve Barker
- Written by: Rae Brunton
- Produced by: Arabella Croft; Kieran Parker
- Starring: Ray Stevenson; Julian Wadham; Richard Brake; Michael Smiley; Enoch Frost; Paul Blair; Julian Rivett; Brett Fancy; Johnny Meres
- Cinematography: Gavin Struthers
- Edited by: Alastair Reid
- Music by: James Seymour Brett
- Distributed by: ContentFilm
- Release dates: 11 March 2008 (United States); 16 May 2008 (United Kingdom)
- Running time: 90 minutes
- Country: United Kingdom
- Language: English
- Box office: $ 463 377

Outpost is a 2008 British war horror film, directed by Steve Barker and written by Rae Brunton, about a rough group of experienced mercenaries who find themselves fighting for their lives after being hired to take a mysterious businessman into the woods to locate a World War II-era military bunker.

== Plot ==
Somewhere in an active Eastern European war zone between government and insurgent forces, businessman Hunt hires former Royal Marine-turned-mercenary D.C. to assemble a crack team of ex-soldiers – Prior, Jordan, Cotter, Voyteche, McKay, and "Tak" Taktarov. Their mission is to protect him on a dangerous journey into no-man's land to investigate some "real estate" for a company, although Voyteche claims that there is nothing out there.

Going most of the way by truck, they traverse the forest and hear distant fighting, artillery, jets fly overhead, and an intense burst of static knocks out their radios. Reaching their destination, the team discovers a seemingly abandoned bunker complex. Leaving Jordan and Tak above ground, the rest of the team explore the outpost. Jordan notices a flash of light coming from the trees: assuming it is sunlight flashing off a scope, Tak fires. Another burst of static is heard, and McKay is hit in the arm by the only returning shot. Tak scouts the trees, finding no one and nothing: not even bullet casings. Locating the bunker’s generator, D.C. and Hunt get to work restoring the power. Cotter and McKay discover a room filled with corpses and are horrified to find a catatonic survivor, Götz. As the lights come on, Prior discovers a room with a projector screen and, behind it, the flag of the Nazi Party.

The mercenaries interrogate Götz to no avail, and assume that local paramilitaries used the bunker to hide evidence of ethnic cleansing. Jordan suggests that there might be a stockpile of hidden Nazi gold. D.C. orders a perimeter of landmines, assuming that hostiles may likewise be looking for the cache. Hunt goes through some documents and finds a back room containing a large generator-like device, secretly informing the company. McKay momentarily sees two jackbooted men standing next to Götz before they vanish. Hunt, meanwhile, similarly spots a disappearing Nazi SS trooper behind him and is locked in the room, but assumes it is only a prank. He then vaguely explains the machine's purpose to D.C.: it is designed to manipulate unified physics fields with "limitless" potential applications.

McKay's work on the bunker's radio initially produces scream-like static and then loud classical music, refusing to stop when unplugged until it spontaneously explodes. Outside that night, a mist appears, mysterious lights shine from the trees, and silhouettes of figures are seen who are unaffected by gunfire. A sudden, intense windstorm forces the mercenaries to take cover; afterwards, they find that Tak is missing and an Iron Cross placed where he was. Back in the bunker, Jordan shows D.C. the round he removed from McKay— a German rifle round not in use since the Second World War. The bullet is warped and deformed; the odds that it could have been fired from a rifle are slim. When a furious D.C. threatens Götz with a pistol, his eyes move.

Hunt explains that the company wants him to find and recover the device, which was used by the SS for reality-shifting, invisibility, and reanimation experiments to make an army of unstoppable undead soldiers. He reveals that the company has leverage on them all: if the team tries to evacuate, hitmen will be dispatched to go after his and their families. Outside, Tak is brutally tortured and killed beyond the perimeter. Voyteche, caught alone, is also silently stabbed to death and found propped up with Tak's body the next morning. Despite the threat of Hunt’s backers, D.C. orders an evacuation. Cotter goes to collect Hunt but is attacked by an SS trooper who impales him with a pickaxe and crushes his skull. When Hunt shows the surviving mercenaries the tape of the experiments, they realize Götz is an SS Brigadeführer responsible for the experiments. An enraged Prior promptly blows his brains out but with little effect; Götz reanimates and kills McKay, leaving him outside. Left with no other option, DC, Prior, Jordan, and Hunt plan to restart the machine to neutralize the SS and trap them in the bunker.

That night the undead SS garrison, now led by Götz, attacks in force. The mercenaries fight a delaying action to buy Hunt time to power up the machine. Prior is brought down before Hunt manages to set off a shockwave which disables the undead. However, the unstable machine is disabled and the attack resumes. Jordan is pulled down a side corridor and savagely killed. A wounded D.C. tries to buy time for Hunt to escape through the vents, only to be overrun as well. Hunt finds himself in the test chamber only to be cornered by Götz and his men before being pulled down from behind.

A second corporate team arrives 72 hours later to carry out the same assignment, only to find a "breather" among the piles of naked corpses. Outside, the clearing is illuminated again and Götz gives the SS soldiers a nod to begin their assault on the team.

== Cast ==
- Julian Wadham as Hunt, "Company" Agent
- Ray Stevenson as D.C., British Royal Marine Warrant Officer
- Richard Brake as Prior, United States Marine Corps
- Paul Blair as Jordan, French Foreign Legionnaire
- Brett Fancy as "Tak" Taktarov, Russian Alpha Group
- Enoch Frost as Cotter, Belgian Peacekeeper
- Julian Rivett as Voyteche, Yugoslav Military
- Michael Smiley as "Mac" McKay, British Army Parachute Regiment
- Johnny Meres as SS Brigadeführer Götz, German Officer ("The Breather")

== Production ==
The film was produced by Scottish couple Arabella Croft and Kieran Parker and their production company Black Camel Pictures. They mortgaged their Glasgow home in order to raise £200,000 to finance production. The script is by Rae Brunton, based on Parker's original concept, which he described as "Platoon meets The Sixth Sense".

Although set in Eastern Europe, filming was done in the ruined WWII Edingham Munitions factory near Dalbeattie, in a forest on the Balmaghie estate near Castle Douglas, and in the Glasgow Film City studio complex in the Govan area of Glasgow. Filming began in January 2007.

Sony Pictures bought distribution rights to the film for £1.2 million. Sony released it directly to DVD in the USA on 11 March 2008. Following favourable reviews, the film was exhibited theatrically across Europe. The film's European premiere was at a gala showing as part of the Dumfries Film Festival on 3 May, followed by limited distribution to 130 UK cinemas.

== Reception ==
Will Brownridge from The Film Reel.com gave the film a positive review, commending the film's acting, and "creepy" zombie design. On his website Ozus' World Movie Reviews, Dennis Schwartz awarded the film a grade C. In his review, Schwartz criticized the film's underdeveloped story, and muddled script, but commended the film's atmosphere, cinematography, music score, and action sequences, calling it "a commercial attempt to pull in some coin during the popular zombie craze sweeping the world of cinema".

== Franchise ==
=== Sequel ===
Outpost has spawned two additional films in the series, a 2012 direct-to-DVD sequel Outpost: Black Sun

=== Prequel ===
A 2013 prequel Outpost: Rise of the Spetsnaz.

Barker returned to helm the 2012 Black Sun but did not return to direct Rise of the Spetsnaz, which was directed by Kieran Parker, one of the producers for Outpost and Black Sun. Both films were largely panned by mainstream critic outlets.
