= Steve Barker (film director) =

English film director and screenwriter

- Born: Steven John Barker; 4 April 1971 (age 55); Blackpool, England
- Years active: 2007 – present

Steve Barker (born 4 April 1971) is an English film director and screenwriter. He wrote and directed the short-film Magic Hour (2002) starring John Simm. In 2008 he made his directorial feature film debut Outpost, starring Ray Stevenson and Richard Brake.

He was a director on the television series Gifted which was broadcast on the BBC in 2025.
