= List of Brian Cox performances =

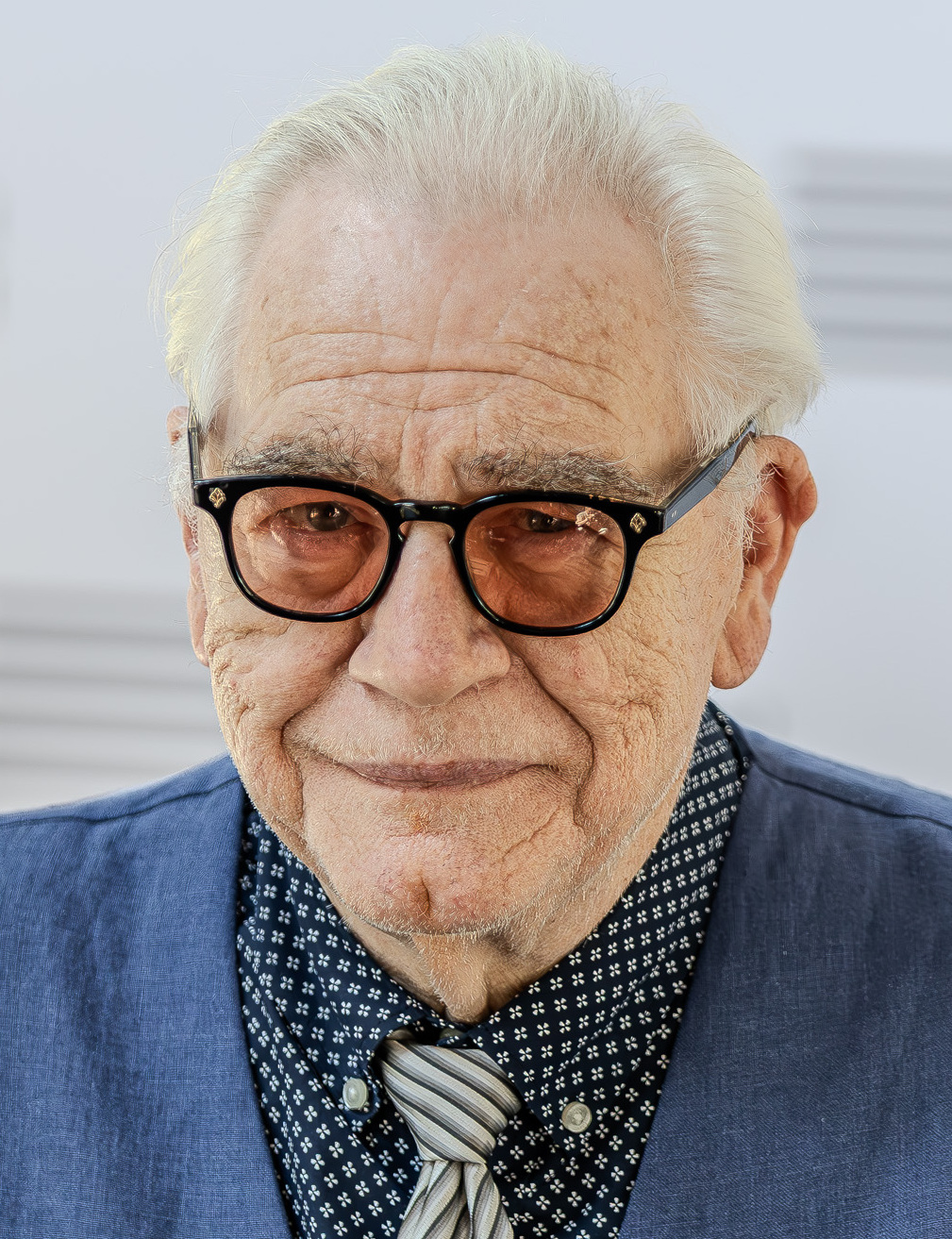
Cox at the Edinburgh International Book Festival in 2025

Scottish actor Brian Cox has appeared in various films and television series such as Manhunter (1986), Rob Roy and Braveheart (both 1995), The Long Kiss Goodnight (1996), Nuremberg (2000), Super Troopers (2001), The Bourne Identity, The Ring and Adaptation (all 2002), X2 (2003), Troy (2004), Red Eye (2005), Deadwood (2006), Zodiac (2007), Red (2008), Red (2010), Coriolanus and Rise of the Planet of the Apes (both 2011), Red 2 (2013), Succession (2018–2023), Good Omens (2019), and Last Moment of Clarity (2020).

He has also appeared in various theatre productions such as The Music Man (1994), St. Nicholas (1999), Dublin Carol (2000), Uncle Varick (2004), Rock 'n' Roll (2006–2008) That Championship Season (2011), and The Weir (2014).

== Film ==
Year	Title	Role(s)	Note
1971	Nicholas and Alexandra	Leon Trotsky	
1975	In Celebration	Steven Shaw	
1986	Manhunter	Dr. Hannibal Lecktor	
1990	Hidden Agenda	Peter Kerrigan	
1993	The Eye of Vichy	Narrator	Documentary film
1994	Iron Will	Angus McTeague	
1994	Prince of Jutland	Æthelwine of Lindsey	
1995	Rob Roy	Killearn	
1995	Braveheart	Argyle Wallace	
1996	Chain Reaction	Lyman Earl Collier	
1996	The Glimmer Man	Mr. Smith	
1996	The Long Kiss Goodnight	Dr. Nathan Waldman	
1997	Kiss the Girls	Chief Hatfield	
1997	The Boxer	Joe Hamill	
1997	Food for Ravens	Aneurin Bevan	Profile drama
1998	Desperate Measures	Captain Jeremiah Cassidy	
1998	Rushmore	Dr. Nelson Guggenheim	
1998	The Minus Man	Doug Durwin	
1998	The Corruptor	Sean Wallace	
1998	For Love of the Game	Gary Wheeler	
2000	Complicity	Inspector McDunn	
2000	Mad About Mambo	Sidney McLoughlin	
2000	A Shot at Glory	Martin Smith	
2000	Saltwater	George Beneventi	
2001	Super Troopers	Captain John O'Hagen	
2001	L.I.E.	Big John Harrigan	
2001	Strictly Sinatra	Chisolm	
2001	The Affair of the Necklace	Minister Baron de Breteuil	
2002	Bug	Cyr	
2002	The Rookie	Jim Morris Sr.	
2002	The Bourne Identity	Ward Abbott	
2002	The Ring	Richard Morgan	
2002	Adaptation.	Robert McKee	
2002	25th Hour	James Brogan	
2002	The Trials of Henry Kissinger	Narrator	Documentary film
2003	X2	William Stryker	
2003	Sin	Captain Oakes	
2004	The Reckoning	Tobias	
2004	Troy	Agamemnon	
2004	The Bourne Supremacy	Ward Abbott	
2004	Get the Picture	Harry Sondheim	Short film
2005	Match Point	Alec Hewett	
2005	Red Eye	Joe Reisert	
2005	The Ringer	Gary Barker	
2006	A Woman in Winter	Dr. Hunt	
2006	The Flying Scotsman	Douglas Baxter	
2006	Running with Scissors	Dr. Finch	
2007	Zodiac	Melvin Belli	
2007	Battle for Terra	General Hemmer (voice)	
2007	The Water Horse: Legend of the Deep	Angus MacMorrow (older)	
2007	Trick 'r Treat	Mr. Kreeg	
2007	Shoot on Sight	Daniel Tennant	
2008	Red	Avery Ludlow	
2008	The Escapist	Frank Perry	Also an executive producer
2008	Agent Crush	Spanners (voice)	
2009	Scooby-Doo! and the Samurai Sword	Green Dragon (voice)	Direct-to-DVD film
2009	Tell-Tale	Detective Van Doren	
2009	Fantastic Mr. Fox	Dan Peabody (voice)	
2009	The Good Heart	Jacques	
2010	Wide Blue Yonder	Wally	Also released as All At Sea
2010	Red	Ivan Simanov	
2010	As Good as Dead	Reverend Kalahan	
2011	Coriolanus	Menenius Agrippa	
2011	Ironclad	William d'Aubigny	
2011	The Veteran	Gerry	
2011	Rise of the Planet of the Apes	John Landon	
2011	Citizen Gangster	Glover Boyd	
2011	Exit Humanity	Malcolm Young (voice)	
2011	The Revelation of the Pyramids	Narrator	Documentary film
2012	The Campaign	Raymond Huggins	
2012	My City	The Journalist	Short film
2012	Blood	Lanny Fairburn	
2013	Red 2	Ivan Simanov	
2013	Blumenthal	Harold	
2013	Mindscape	Sebastian	
2013	Her	Alan Watts (voice)	
2013	Believe	Sir Matt Busby	
2014	The Anomaly	Dr. Langham	
2015	Pixels	Admiral Porter	
2015	Forsaken	James McCurdy	
2015	Killing Thyme	Norman	Short film
2016	Morgan	Jim Bryce	
2016	The Carer	Sir Michael Gifford	
2016	The Autopsy of Jane Doe	Tommy Tilden	
2017	Bob the Builder: Mega Machines	Conrad and Crunch (voices)	
2017	Churchill	Winston Churchill	
2017	Kubrick By Candlelight	Narrator	Short film
2018	Super Troopers 2	Captain John O'Hagan	
2018	The Etruscan Smile	Rory MacNeil	Also released under the title Rory's Way
2018	Pretenders	Henry	
2019	Remember Me	Shane	
2019	Strange but True	Bill Erwin	
2019	The Last Right	Father Reilly	
2020	John Rebus: The Lockdown Blues	John Rebus	Short film
2020	Last Moment of Clarity	Gilles	
2020	The Bay of Silence	Milton	
2021	Separation	Paul Rivers	
2022	Prisoner's Daughter	Max	
2022	Mending the Line	Ike Fletcher	Also an executive producer
2022	The Independent	Nick Booker	Also an executive producer
2024	Little Wing	Jaan	Also an executive producer
2024	That Christmas	Santa Claus (voice)	
2024	The Lord of the Rings: The War of the Rohirrim	Helm Hammerhand (voice)	
2025	The Electric State	Popfly (voice)	
2025	The Parenting	Frank	
2025	Glenrothan	Sandy	Also a director and a producer
2026	Super Troopers 3	Captain John O'Hagan	Post-production

== Television ==
=== Television series ===
Roles in television series
Year	Title	Role	Notes
1968	Theatre 625	Lasar Opie	Episode: "The Year of the Sex Olympics"
1970	Manhunt	Anton	Episode: "Degrade and Rule"
1978	The Devil's Crown	Henry II of England	7 episodes
1978	Out	Tony McGrath	3 episodes
1980	Thérèse Raquin	Laurent LeClaire	3 episodes
1980	Hammer House of Horror	Chuck Spillers	Episode: "The Silent Scream"
1982	Minder	Frank McFadden	Episode: "In"
1983	Jemima Shore Investigates	Hamish McFaul	Episode: "A Chamber of Horrors"
1990	Perfect Scoundrels	Father Amedy	Episode: "The Milk of Human Kindness"
1992	Van der Valk	Stefan Szabo	Episode: "The Ties That Bind"
1992	The Big Battalions	Edward Hoyland	5 episodes
1993	Inspector Morse	Michael Steppings	Episode: "Deadly Slumber"
1994	Grushko	Colonel Grushko	3 episodes
1997	Red Dwarf	The King	Episode: "Stoke Me a Clipper"
1997	Superman: The Animated Series	Earl Garver (voice)	Episode: "Two's a Crowd"
2000	Nuremberg	Hermann Göring	2 episodes
2002	Frasier	Harry Moon	2 episodes
2004	French and Saunders	King Lear	1 episode
2005	Danny Phantom	Pariah Dark (voice)	Episode: "Reign Storm"
2006	Deadwood	Jack Langrishe	9 episodes
2009	Kings	King Vesper Abedon	3 episodes
2009	The Take	Ozzy	4 episodes
2009	The Day of the Triffids	Dennis Masen	Episode: "Part Two"
2010	Agatha Christie's Marple	Lewis Serrocold	Episode: "They Do It With Mirrors"
2010	Doctor Who	Ood Elder (voice)	Episode: "The End of Time"
2010	The Big C	Donald Tolkey	Episode: "Two for the Road"
2012	The Straits	Harry Montebello	10 episodes
2012	A Touch of Cloth	Bill Ball	Episode: "The First Case: Part Two"
2013	Bob Servant Independent	Bob Servant	6 episodes
2013	Tooned	Performer (voice)	Episode: "The Grand Finale"
2014	The Game	'Daddy'	6 episodes
2014	Shetland	Magnus Bain	2 episodes
2014	Bob Servant	Bob Servant	3 episodes
2014	After Braveheart	Narrator (voice)	2 episodes
2015	The Slap	Manolis Apostolou	7 episodes
2016	Penny Dreadful	Jared Talbot	2 episodes
2016	War & Peace	Mikhail Kutuzov	4 episodes
2016	Medici: Masters of Florence	Bernardo Guadagni	8 episodes
2017	Urban Myths	Marlon Brando	Episode: "Elizabeth, Michael and Marlon"
2018–2023	Succession	Logan Roy	34 episodes
2019	Good Omens	Death (voice)	3 episodes
2021	The Simpsons	Kostas Becker (voice)	Episode: "A Serious Flanders"
2021–2022	Blade Runner: Black Lotus	Niander Wallace Sr. (voice)	5 episodes
2022	Last Week Tonight with John Oliver	God	Episode: "Aridification of the Western U.S."
2023	Aqua Teen Hunger Force	Anubis (voice)	Episode: "Anubis"
2023–present	007: Road to a Million	The Controller	16 episodes
2026–present	Dexter: Resurrection	Don Framt/The New York Ripper	Main role (season 2)

Key
†	Denotes television productions that have not yet been released

=== Television films ===
Roles in television films
Year	Title	Role	Notes
1983	King Lear	Duke of Burgundy	
1984	Pope John Paul II	Father Gora	
1985	Florence Nightingale	Dr. McGregor	
1990	Secret Weapon	Andrew Neil	
1991	The Lost Language of Cranes	Owen Benjamin	
1991	Red Fox	Geoffrey Harrison	
1992	The Cloning of Joanna May	Carl May	
1993	Sharpe's Rifles	Major Michael Hogan	
1993	Sharpe's Eagle	Major Michael Hogan	
2000	Longitude	Lord Morton	
2005	Blue/Orange	Dr. Robert Smith	
2008	The Colour of Magic	Narrator	
2010	On Expenses	Michael Martin MP	
2011	The Sinking of the Laconia	Captain Rudolph Sharp	
2013	An Adventure in Space and Time	Sydney Newman	

== Theatre ==
Theatre roles
Year	Title	Role	Venue
1967	As You Like It	Orlando	Vaudeville Theatre, London
1969	In Celebration	Steven Shaw	Royal Court Theatre, London
1970–1971	Don’t Start Without Me	Norman	Garrick Theatre, London; Harrogate Theatre, North Yorkshire
1971–1972	Getting On	Brian Lowther	Theatre Royal, Brighton
1973	Cromwell	Proctor	Royal Court Theatre, London
1973	Hedda Gabler	Eilert Lövborg	Royal Court Theatre, London
1976	The Émigrés	XX	Royal National Theatre, London
1976–1977	Tamburlaine	Theridamas	Royal National Theatre, London
1977	Julius Caesar	Marcus Brutus	Royal National Theatre, London
1978	The Putney Debates	Henry Ireton	Royal National Theatre, London
1978–1979	Herod	Herod	Royal National Theatre, London
1980	The Summer Party	Kramer	Crucible Theatre, Sheffield
1981	Babel	Goatman	Donmar Warehouse, London
1982–1984	Danton's Death	Georges Danton	Royal National Theatre, London
1985	Strange Interlude	Edmund Darrell	Nederlander Theatre, Broadway
1985	Rat in the Skull	Nelson	The Public Theater, Off-Broadway
1986	The Danton Affair	Danton	Barbican Centre, London
1986	Misalliance	John Tarleton	Barbican Centre, London
1986–1987	A Penny for a Song	Sir Timothy Bellboys	Barbican Centre, London
1987–1988	Fashion	Paul Cash	The Other Place, Stratford-upon-Avon; The Pit, London
1987–1988	Titus Andronicus	Titus	Swan Theatre, Stratford-upon-Avon; People's Theatre, Newcastle upon Tyne; Barbican Centre, London
1987–1988	The Taming of the Shrew	Petruchio	Royal Shakespeare Theatre, Stratford-upon-Avon; Theatre Royal, New Castle; Barbican Centre, London
1988	Three Sisters	Lt. Col. Vershinin	Barbican Centre, London
1989	Frankie and Johnny in the Clair de Lune	Johnny	Comedy Theatre, London
1990	King Lear	Lear	Royal National Theatre, London
1990	Richard III	Duke of Buckingham	Royal National Theatre, London
1994	The Music Man	Prof. Harold Hill	Regent's Park Open Air Theatre, London
1997–1998	St. Nicholas	The Critic	Bush Theatre, London; 45th Street Theatre, Broadway
1998	Art	Marc	Royale Theatre, Broadway
1999	St. Nicholas	The Critic	Matrix Theatre, California
2000	Dublin Carol	John Plunkett	Royal Court Theatre, London
2004	Uncle Varick	Varick	Royal Lyceum Theatre, Edinburgh
2006–2008	Rock 'n' Roll	Max	Royal Court Theatre, London; Bernard B. Jacobs Theatre, Broadway
2011	That Championship Season	Coach	Bernard B. Jacobs Theatre, Broadway
2014	The Weir	Jack	Donmar Warehouse, London
2019	The Great Society	Lyndon B. Johnson	Vivian Beaumont Theatre, Broadway
2023	The Score	Johann Sebastian Bach	Theatre Royal Bath, Bath
2024	Long Day's Journey Into Night	James Tyrone	Wyndham's Theatre, London
2025	Make It Happen	Adam Smith	Dundee Rep Theatre, Dundee; Festival Theatre, Edinburgh

== Video games ==
Video games voice roles
Year	Title	Voice role
2003	Manhunt	Director Lionel Starkweather
2003	Vexx	Dark Yabu, Darby
2004	Killzone	Scolar Visari
2009	Killzone 2	Scolar Visari
2011	Killzone 3	Scolar Visari
2012	Syndicate	Jack Denham
2024	Tekken 8	Trailer Narration

== Audio ==
Audio roles
Year	Title	Role	Author	Refs.
1999–present	McLevy	Inspector James McLevy	David Ashton	
2020	From Now	Hunter Fitz	Rhys Wakefield	
2021	The Sandman: Act II	Augustus	Neil Gaiman, Dirk Maggs	

== See also ==
- List of awards and nominations received by Brian Cox
