= List of awards and nominations received by Brian Cox =

Accolades of the Scottish actor Brian Cox

Brian Cox awards and nominations
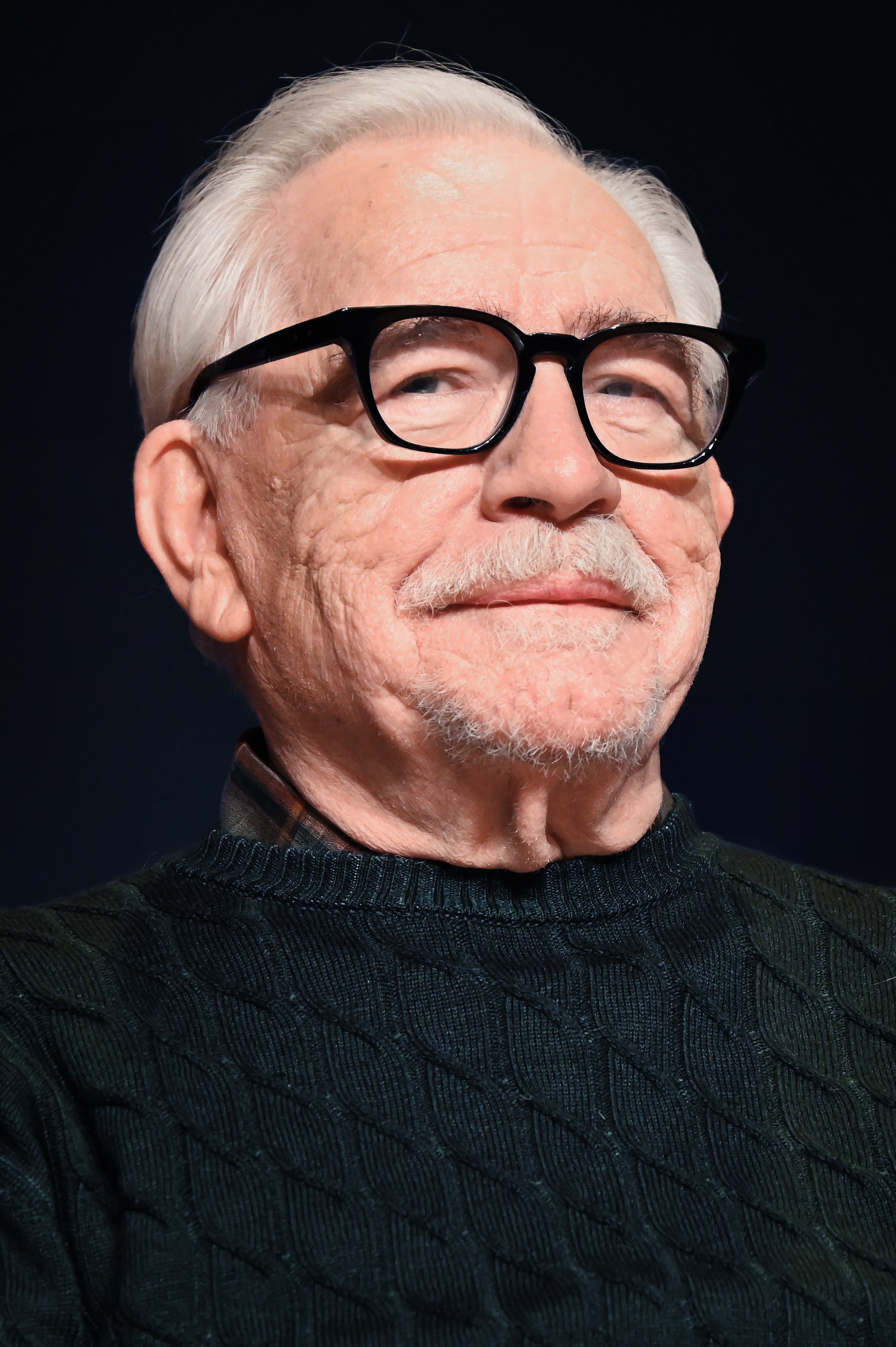
- Cox in 2024
Awards and nominations
Award	Wins	Nominations
Actor Awards	2	7
BAFTA Awards	2	7
Emmy Awards	2	6
Golden Globes	1	4
Olivier Awards	2	4

Totals (Note: Certain award groups do not simply award one winner. They acknowledge several different recipients, have runners-up, and have third place. Since this is a specific recognition and is different from losing an award, runner-up mentions are considered wins in this award tally. For simplification and to avoid errors, each award in this list has been presumed to have had a prior nomination.)
- Wins: 9
- Nominations: 28

Brian Cox is a Scottish actor known for his performances on stage and screen, for which he has received two BAFTA Awards, an Emmy Award, a Golden Globe Award, two Screen Actors Guild Awards and two Olivier Awards.

Cox won the Primetime Emmy Award for Best Supporting Actor in a Limited Series for his portrayal of Hermann Göring in the television film Nuremberg (2001). The following year he guest starred on the NBC sitcom Frasier earning his second Emmy nomination in 2002. He portrayed Jack Langrishe in the HBO series Deadwood. He starred as Logan Roy on HBO series Succession (2018–2023), for which he won the Golden Globe Award for Best Actor in a Drama Series and was nominated for the Primetime Emmy Award for Best Actor in a Drama Series.

Cox trained as a Shakespearean actor, starring in numerous productions with the Royal National Theatre and the Royal Shakespeare Company, where he received two Laurence Olivier Awards for Best Actor for his roles in Rat in the Skull (1984) for the Royal Court and Titus Andronicus (1988) for the Royal Shakespeare Company. He received two more Olivier Award nominations for Misalliance and Fashion.

== Major associations ==
=== Actor Awards ===
Year	Category	Nominated work	Result	Ref.
2000	Outstanding Actor in a Miniseries or TV Movie	Nuremberg	Nominated	
2002	Outstanding Cast in a Motion Picture	Adaptation	Nominated	
2006	Outstanding Ensemble in a Drama Series	Deadwood	Nominated	
2021	Outstanding Ensemble in a Drama Series	Succession	Won	
2021	Outstanding Actor in a Drama Series	Succession	Nominated	
2023	Outstanding Ensemble in a Drama Series	Succession	Won	
2023	Outstanding Actor in a Drama Series	Succession	Nominated	

=== BAFTA Awards ===
Year	Category	Nominated work	Result	Ref.
BAFTA Television Awards
1993	Best Actor	The Lost Language of Cranes	Nominated	
2024	Best Actor	Succession	Nominated	
BAFTA Scotland Awards
1995	Best Actor in a Film	Rob Roy	Nominated	
2004	Outstanding Achievement Award		Won	
2008	Best Acting Performance in Film	The Escapist	Won	
2016	Best Actor - Film	The Carer	Nominated	
2022	Audience Award	Succession	Nominated	

=== Emmy Awards ===
Year	Category	Nominated work	Result	Ref.
2001	Outstanding Supporting Actor in a Miniseries or a Movie	Nuremberg	Won	
2002	Outstanding Guest Actor in a Comedy Series	Frasier	Nominated	
2020	Outstanding Lead Actor in a Drama Series	Succession (episode: "Hunting")	Nominated	
2022	Outstanding Lead Actor in a Drama Series	Succession (episode: "All the Bells Say")	Nominated	
2023	Outstanding Lead Actor in a Drama Series	Succession (episode: "Rehearsal")	Nominated	
2025	Outstanding Commercial	"Brian Cox Goes to College" (with Uber)	Won	

=== Golden Globe Awards ===
Year	Category	Nominated work	Result	Ref.
2000	Best Actor – Miniseries or Television Film	Nuremberg	Nominated	
2020	Best Actor – Television Series Drama	Succession	Won	
2022	Best Actor – Television Series Drama	Succession	Nominated	
2024	Best Actor – Television Series Drama	Succession	Nominated	

=== Olivier Awards ===
Year	Category	Nominated work	Result	Ref.
1984	Actor of the Year in a New Play	Rat in the Skull	Won	
1986	Best Comedy Performance	Misalliance	Nominated	
1988	Actor of the Year in a Revival	Titus Andronicus	Won	
1988	Actor of the Year in a New Play	Fashion	Nominated	

== Theater ==
Year	Award	Category	Work	Result	Ref.
1984	British Theatre Association Drama Awarda	Best Actor	Strange Interlude	Won	
1984	Critics' Circle Theatre Awards	Best Actor	Strange Interlude, Rat in the Skull	Won	
1987	British Theatre Association Drama Awards	Best Actor	The Taming of the Shrew	Won	
1987	Critics' Circle Theatre Awards	Best Actor	The Taming of the Shrew, Titus Andronicus, Fashion	Won	
1998	Lucille Lortel Awards	Outstanding Lead Actor	St. Nicholas	Won	
1998	Drama Desk Awards	Outstanding Actor in a Play	St. Nicholas	Nominated	
1998	Outer Critics Circle Awards	Outstanding Solo Performance	St. Nicholas	Nominated	

== Miscellaneous awards ==
Year	Award	Category	Work	Result	Ref.
2001	Gemini Awards	Best Actor in a Supporting Role	Nuremberg	Won	
2001	Online Film & Television Association Awards	Best Supporting Actor	Nuremberg	Nominated	
2002	AFI Awards	Featured Male Actor of the Year - Movies	L.I.E.	Nominated	
2002	Boston Society of Film Critics	Best Actor	L.I.E.	Won	
2002	Satellite Awards	Best Actor – Motion Picture Drama	L.I.E.	Won	
2002	Dallas–Fort Worth Film Critics Association	Best Supporting Actor	L.I.E.	Nominated	
2002	Film Independent Spirit Awards	Best Male Lead	L.I.E.	Nominated	
2002	National Society of Film Critics	Best Supporting Actor	L.I.E.	Nominated	
2002	New York Film Critics Circle	Best Supporting Actor	L.I.E.	Nominated	
2002	Chlotrudris Awards	Best Supporting Actor	L.I.E.	Nominated	
2002	Awards Circuit Community Awards	Best Cast Ensemble	Adaptation.	Nominated	
2003	Gold Derby Awards	Best Ensemble Cast	Adaptation.	Nominated	
2003	Online Film Critics Society Awards	Best Ensemble	Adaptation.	Nominated	
2003	Phoenix Film Critics Society Awards	Best Acting Ensemble	Adaptation.	Nominated	
2003	Teen Choice Awards	Choice Movie Villain	X2	Nominated	
2005	London Critics Circle Film Awards	British Supporting Actor of the Year	Troy	Nominated	
2006	Empire Awards	Icon Award		Won	
2007	Satellite Awards	Best Supporting Actor – Motion Picture	Zodiac	Nominated	
2008	Sitges Film Festival	Best Actor	Red	Won	
2009	Fright Meter Awards	Best Supporting Actor	Trick 'r Treat	Nominated	
2010	Method Fest Independent Film Festival	Best Actor - Feature Film	The Good Heart	Won	
2011	Edda Awards	Actor of the Year	The Good Heart	Nominated	
2016	Stony Brook Film Festival	Career Achievement Award		Won	
2016	United International Film Festival	Best Narrator	Andrew Carnegie: Rags to Riches, Power to Peace	Won	
2018	Boston Film Festival	Best Ensemble Cast	The Etruscan Smile	Won	
2019	Overcome Film Festival	Jury Prize - Best Voice Actor	A Modern Magician	Won	
2019	Satellite Awards	Best Actor – Television Series Drama	Succession	Nominated	
2019	IGN Summer Movie Awards	Best TV Ensemble	Succession	Won	
2019	Online Film & Television Association Awards	Best Actor in a Drama Series	Succession	Nominated	
2020	Gold Derby Awards	Best Drama Actor	Succession	Nominated	
2020	International Online Cinema Awards	Best Actor in a Drama Series	Succession	Nominated	
2020	Online Film & Television Association Awards	Best Actor in a Drama Series	Succession	Nominated	
2020	Mindfield Film Festival Albuquerque	Diamond Award - Best Narrator	A Castle in Brooklyn, King Arthur	Won	
2021	New Media Film Festival	Festival Award	A Castle in Brooklyn, King Arthur	Nominated	

== See also ==
- List of Brian Cox performances
