= Adrian Sturges =

British-born film producer (born 1976)

- Born: 1976 (age 49–50); Lewisham, London, United Kingdom
- Years active: 2001–present
- Spouse: Catherine Mahoney
- Children: Nancy Sturges; Gilbert Sturges

Adrian Sturges (born 17 October 1976) is a British-born film producer.

== Early life ==
Sturges was born in London, England and grew up in Rochester, Kent

== Education ==
Sturges was educated at The King's School, Rochester, in Kent, in South East England.

He studied Theology and Religious Studies and History of Art at King's College, Cambridge and graduated with First Class Honours in 1998. Whilst at Cambridge he was President of the Cambridge University Amateur Dramatic Club and produced comedy for the Footlights.

Sturges studied producing at the National Film and Television School, taking their Industry Course and was selected for the inaugural Inside Pictures scheme.

== Life and career ==
Sturges began his career working as assistant to producer Simon Relph whilst he was also chairman of BAFTA. Sturges began producing by making the short films of such directors as Rupert Wyatt – Subterrain and Get the Picture, Gareth Lewis – Normal for Norfolk and Sam Taylor-Wood – Love You More, the latter being nominated for the BAFTA and the Palme d'Or

His first feature was The Baker, written and directed by Gareth Lewis. Subsequently, he produced The Escapist, the first film by Rupert Wyatt which was selected for the Sundance Film Festival and for which he won the British Independent Film Awards prize for Best Achievement in Production. He then produced The Disappearance of Alice Creed, written and directed by J Blakeson which premiered at the Toronto International Film Festival. In 2011 he produced Albatross, the film debut of Niall MacCormick.

For television he has produced Whatever Happened to Harry Hill? for Channel 4 – a spoof documentary about the comedian.

Future projects include J Blakeson's Bad Blood and Trouble which he is producing with Michael De Luca.

Sturges was named a Producer to Watch by Variety a Star of Tomorrow by Screen International Producer on the Move at Cannes Film Festival by European Film Promotion and a BAFTA Brit to Watch in 2011

== Personal life ==
Sturges has a daughter, Nancy, born in 2010 and a son, Gilbert, born in 2011 with his partner Catherine Mahoney.
