= Joe Walker (film editor) =

British film editor

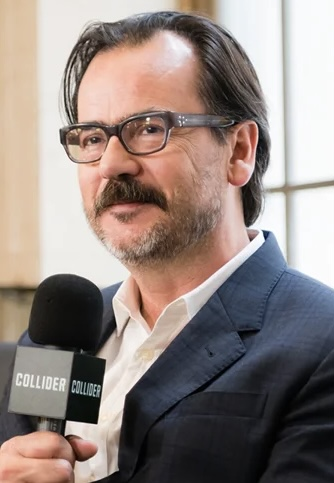
- Walker in 2018
- Education: University of York (BA)
- Occupation: Film editor

Joe Walker is a British film editor who has worked in both England and Los Angeles. In 2022, he won the Academy Award for Best Film Editing for his work on Dune, having been nominated twice before for 12 Years a Slave and Arrival. For the American Cinema Editors Award for Best Edited Feature Film – Dramatic he has received a string of six nominations and in 2016 he won, for Arrival. He has received five nominations for a BAFTA Film Award for Best Editing. He took the European Film Award for Best Editor for Shame in 2012 and Satellite Award for Best Editing for Sicario in 2016.

== Early life ==
Walker grew up in the West London Borough of Ealing. Raised Catholic, his father was a History master, while his mother was one of Winston Churchill's wartime short-hand typists.

Walker initially trained as a classical composer. In 1984, he received his B.A. degree in music at the University of York. Walker learned editing in the BBC's Film Department at Ealing Studios.

== Career ==
Walker started as a Sound Editor, coaxing animal impersonator Percy Edwards out of retirement to provide gorilla noises for Philip Saville's series First Born (1988), his first collaboration with composer Hans Zimmer. After his first forays as a Film Editor, cutting classical music documentaries for the BBC, Walker broke into editing drama with Julian Farino's Out of the Blue and comedy with two series of David Renwick's Jonathan Creek.

Walker has had two notable partnerships with major directors: Steve McQueen and Denis Villeneuve.

His first collaboration with McQueen, Hunger (2008), was a portrayal of the IRA hunger strikes at Long Kesh starring Michael Fassbender as Bobby Sands. It won the Caméra d'Or at the Cannes Film Festival. Joining again the team of McQueen, Fassbender and cinematographer Sean Bobbitt, Walker cut Shame (2011). This told the story of a successful Manhattanite navigating the terrain of sexual obsession on a path towards self-destruction. Their third collaboration was 12 Years a Slave (2013), the true story of Solomon Northup, a free man kidnapped and sold into slavery, set in 1840s Louisiana. It stars Chiwetel Ejiofor, Brad Pitt, Michael Fassbender, Lupita Nyong'o, Sarah Paulson, Paul Dano, and Paul Giamatti. 12 Years a Slave (2013) won three Academy Awards: Best Picture, Best Supporting Actress for Nyong'o, and Best Adapted Screenplay for John Ridley. In her acceptance speech, Nyong'o paid tribute to Walker, describing him as "the invisible performer in the editing room". The film was awarded the Golden Globe Award for Best Motion Picture – Drama, and the British Academy of Film and Television Arts recognized it with the Best Film and Best Actor for Ejiofor.

Walker has edited all six feature films directed by Denis Villeneuve since 2015. Their first collaboration, Sicario, is a 2015 American crime-thriller drama film starring Benicio del Toro and Josh Brolin in which an idealistic FBI agent Emily Blunt is enlisted in a secret CIA op to bring down the head of a brutal Mexican drug cartel. Arrival is a 2016 American psychological science fiction film based on the 1998 short story "Story of Your Life" by Ted Chiang starring Amy Adams, Jeremy Renner, and Forest Whitaker. Villeneuve said of the movie's creation, "Each film has its hero. For this one, the editor Joe Walker is mine. Arrival was by far the hardest film to edit. Christ, we worked hard!". Their third collaboration is Blade Runner 2049, the sequel to Blade Runner (1982). They next partnered on Dune (2021), based on Frank Herbert's novel of the same name. Their fifth collaboration, Dune: Part Two, was released on 1 March 2024. Their sixth, Dune: Part Three, completes Villeneuve's Dune trilogy and is scheduled to be released on 18 December 2026.

Walker has talked about time being the editor's "greatest superpower". His films with McQueen and Villeneuve showcase experiments with cross-cutting, flashback structures and time loops. McQueen paid tribute to Walker's ability to find the rhythm of a film, saying: "A great film editor is attuned to the silences. They can be just as valuable as the words. It's all about timing. And that's what he has – Joe has time."

In 2010, Walker cut the documentary-feature Life in a Day for Academy Award-winning director Kevin Macdonald and producer Ridley Scott. It was filmed by YouTube users around the world on a single day in July 2010 and is distilled from the 4,500 hours of footage submitted. The movie premiered at the Sundance Film Festival in January 2011.

Walker has edited many British Indie features such as The Escapist (2008) written and directed by Rupert Wyatt; Harry Brown (2009), starring Michael Caine as a modern-day vigilante; and Brighton Rock (2010), a reworking of the Graham Greene classic that set the action against a backdrop of the Mod and Rocker riots of 1964.

Walker has cut many British TV programs: Jimmy McGovern's The Lakes; Eroica for the BBC; ITV blockbuster Doctor Zhivago starring Sam Neill and Keira Knightley; Sword of Honour for Channel 4, starring Daniel Craig; The Devil's Whore, for director Marc Munden and Tommy Tiernan for director Richard Ayoade.

In addition to editing, Walker's music has been played by the Royal Philharmonic Orchestra, live in Trafalgar Square. He wrote the score for the BBC/HBO drama Dirty War. In January 2019, Joe was awarded an honorary doctorate by his alma mater University of York.

== Filmography ==
=== Film ===
Year	Title	Director	Notes
2004	Tabloid	David Blair	produced in 2001, released on TV in 2004
2005	Never Again as Before	Giacomo Campiotti	
2008	Hunger	Steve McQueen	1st of 4 collaborations with McQueen
2008	The Escapist	Rupert Wyatt	
2009	Harry Brown	Daniel Barber	
2010	Brighton Rock	Rowan Joffé	
2011	Life in a Day	Kevin Macdonald	Documentary
2011	Shame	Steve McQueen	
2013	Last Passenger	Omid Nooshin	
2013	12 Years a Slave	Steve McQueen	
2015	Blackhat	Michael Mann	
2015	Sicario	Denis Villeneuve	1st collaboration with Villeneuve
2016	Arrival	Denis Villeneuve	
2017	Blade Runner 2049	Denis Villeneuve	
2018	Widows	Steve McQueen	
2021	Dune	Denis Villeneuve	Also narrator of Paul's filmbook lessons
2021	The Unforgivable	Nora Fingscheidt	
2023	The Creator	Gareth Edwards	Co-edited with Hank Corwin and Scott Morris
2024	Dune: Part Two	Denis Villeneuve	
2026	Dune: Part Three	Denis Villeneuve	Post-production
TBA	Bond 26	Denis Villeneuve	Announced

=== Television ===
- The Devil's Whore (2 episodes) (2008)
- Coup! (2006)
- The Virgin Queen (2005)
- Eroica (2003)
- Doctor Zhivago (2002)
- Sword of Honour (2001)
- The Secret World of Michael Fry (2000)
- Jonathan Creek (6 episodes) (1998–1999)
- The Lakes (6 episodes) (1999)
- In the Red (1998)
- Solti: The Making of a Maestro (1998)
- Out of the Blue (1995)

== Accolades ==
Academy Award for Best Film Editing

- 2013: 12 Years a Slave (nominated)
- 2016: Arrival (nominated)
- 2021: Dune (won)

Alliance of Women Film Journalists Award for Best Editing

- 2013: 12 Years a Slave (nominated)
- 2016: Arrival (nominated)

American Cinema Editors Award for Best Edited Feature Film – Dramatic

- 2013: 12 Years a Slave (nominated)
- 2015: Sicario (nominated)
- 2016: Arrival (won)
- 2017: Blade Runner 2049 (nominated)
- 2021: Dune (nominated)
- 2024: Dune: Part Two (nominated)

BAFTA Award for Best Editing

- 2013: 12 Years a Slave (nominated)
- 2016: Arrival (nominated)
- 2017: Blade Runner 2049 (nominated)
- 2021: Dune (nominated)

British Independent Film Award for Best Technical Achievement

- 2011: Shame (nominated)

Chicago Film Critics Association Award for Best Editing

- 2013: 12 Years a Slave (nominated)

Critics' Choice Movie Award for Best Editing

- 2013: 12 Years a Slave (nominated)
- 2016: Arrival (nominated)
- 2017: Blade Runner 2049 (nominated)
- 2018: Widows (nominated)
- 2021: Dune (nominated)
- 2024: Dune: Part Two (nominated)

European Film Award for Best Editor

- 2011: Shame (won)

Evening Standard British Film Award for Best Technical Achievement

- 2008: The Escapist and Hunger (nominated)

Online Film Critics Society Award for Best Editing

- 2013: 12 Years a Slave (nominated)
- 2015: Sicario (nominated)
- 2016: Arrival (nominated)

Phoenix Film Critics Society Award for Best Film Editing

- 2013: 12 Years a Slave (nominated)

San Diego Film Critics Society Award for Best Editing

- 2013: 12 Years a Slave (nominated)
- 2015: Sicario (nominated)
- 2016: Arrival (nominated)

San Francisco Film Critics Circle Award for Best Editing

- 2013: 12 Years a Slave (nominated)
- 2015: Sicario (nominated)
- 2016: Arrival (won)
- 2017: Blade Runner 2049 (nominated)

Satellite Award for Best Editing

- 2011: Shame (nominated)
- 2013: 12 Years a Slave (nominated)
- 2015: Sicario (won)
- 2018: Widows (nominated)
- 2021: Dune (won)
- 2024: Dune: Part Two (won)

Washington D.C. Area Film Critics Association Award for Best Editing

- 2013: 12 Years a Slave (nominated)
- 2015: Sicario (nominated)
- 2016: Arrival (nominated)
- 2017: Blade Runner 2049 (nominated)
- 2024: Dune: Part Two (won)
