= Brian Cox (actor) =

Scottish actor (born 1946)

Brian Cox CBE
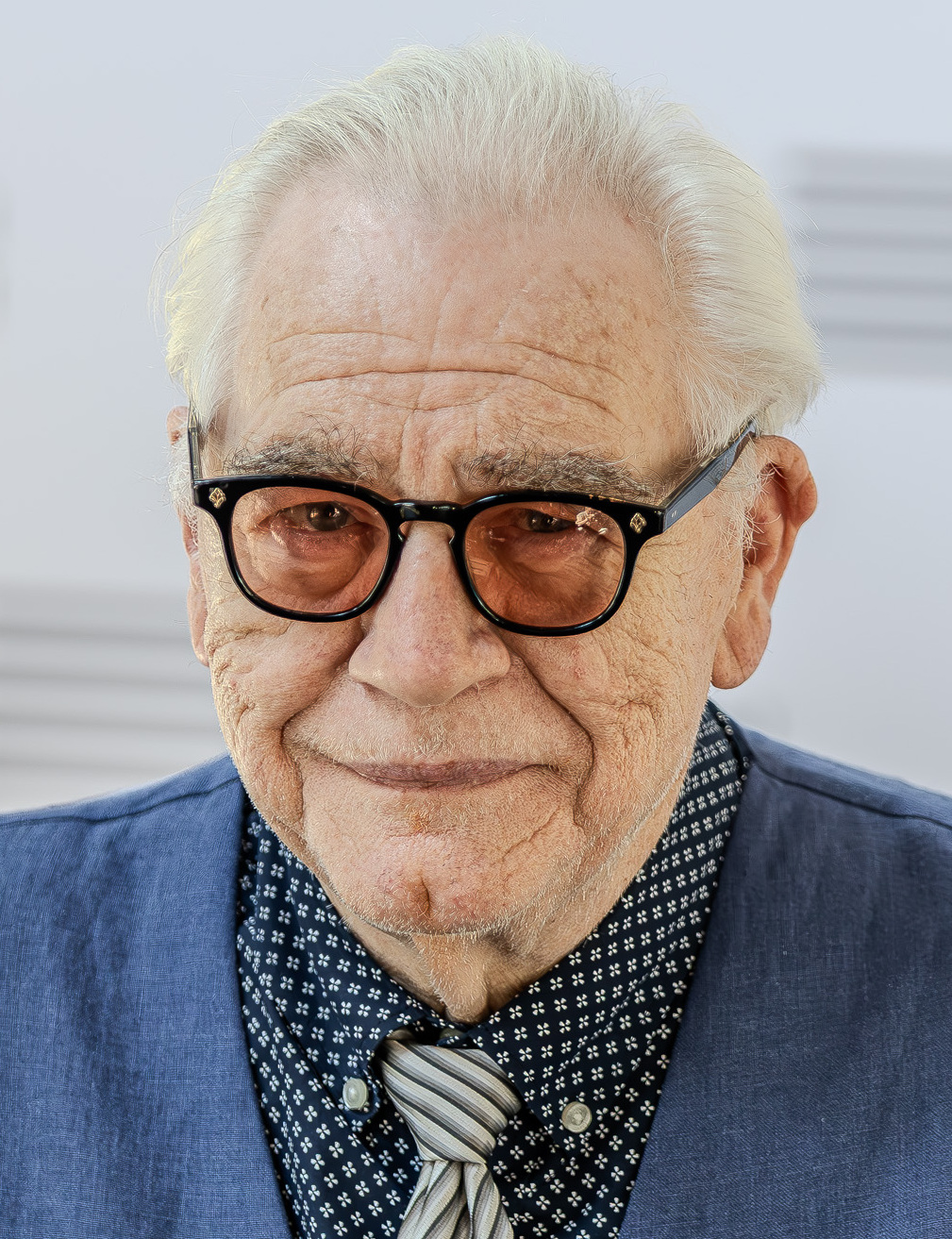
- Cox at the Edinburgh International Book Festival in 2025
- Born: Brian Denis Cox; 1 June 1946 (age 80); Dundee, Scotland
- Education: London Academy of Music and Dramatic Art (BA)
- Occupation: Actor
- Years active: 1961–present
- Works: Full list
- Political party: Labour (1967–2015); SNP (2015–present)
- Spouses: Lilian Monroe-Carr (m. 1966; div. 1967); Caroline Burt (m. 1968; div. 1986); Nicole Ansari (m. 2002)
- Children: 4, including Alan
- Awards: Full list

Brian Denis Cox (born 1 June 1946) is a Scottish actor. A classically trained Shakespearean actor, he is known for his work on stage and screen. His numerous accolades include two Laurence Olivier Awards, a Primetime Emmy Award, and a Golden Globe Award as well as two nominations for a British Academy Television Award. In the 2003 New Year Honours, he was appointed to the Order of the British Empire at the rank of Commander.

Cox trained at the Dundee Repertory Theatre before becoming a founding member of Royal Lyceum Theatre. He went on to train as a Shakespearean actor, starring in numerous productions with the Royal National Theatre and the Royal Shakespeare Company, where he gained recognition for his portrayal of King Lear. Cox received two Laurence Olivier Awards for Best Actor for his performances in Rat in the Skull (1984), for the Royal Court and Titus Andronicus (1988). He received two more Olivier Award nominations for Misalliance (1986) and Fashion (1988).

Known as a character actor in film, Cox played Dr. Hannibal Lecktor in Michael Mann's Manhunter (1986), Robert McKee in Spike Jonze's Adaptation (2002) and William Stryker in X2 (2003). For his starring role in L.I.E. (2001), he received an Independent Spirit Award nomination. His other notable films include Iron Will (1994), Braveheart (1995), The Boxer (1997), The Rookie (2002), Troy (2004), Match Point (2005), Coriolanus (2011), Pixels (2015) and Churchill (2017).

Cox won the Primetime Emmy Award for Outstanding Supporting Actor in a Miniseries or a Movie for his portrayal of Hermann Göring in the television film Nuremberg (2001). The following year he guest starred on the NBC sitcom Frasier earning his second Emmy nomination in 2002. He portrayed Jack Langrishe in the HBO series Deadwood. He starred as Logan Roy on the HBO series Succession (2018–2023), for which he won the Golden Globe Award for Best Actor in a Drama Series and was nominated for three Primetime Emmy Awards for Best Actor in a Drama Series.

== Early life and education ==
Cox was born on 1 June 1946 in Dundee, Scotland, the youngest of five children. He is from a working-class Roman Catholic family of Irish and Scottish descent. His mother, Mary Ann Guillerline (née McCann), was a spinner who worked in the jute mills and suffered several nervous breakdowns during Cox's childhood. His father, Charles McArdle Campbell Cox, was a police officer and later a shopkeeper, and died of pancreatic cancer when Cox was eight years old. Cox was brought up by his three elder sisters, including Betty, with whom Cox has remained close.

In Dundee, Cox attended St Mary's Forebank Primary School and St Michael's Junior Secondary School, which he left at the age of 15. After working at Dundee Repertory Theatre for a few years, he began his training at the London Academy of Music and Dramatic Art at age 17, graduating in 1965.

== Acting career ==
=== Theatre ===
==== 1961–1979: Early work ====
Brian Cox began his acting career at age 14 at Dundee Repertory Theatre in 1961 and then as one of the founding members of the Royal Lyceum Theatre Edinburgh, performing in its first show, The Servant O' Twa Maisters, in October 1965. From 1966, he worked at the Birmingham Repertory Theatre for two years, where he played the title role in Peer Gynt (1967) and made his West End debut in June 1967 as Orlando in As You Like It at the Vaudeville Theatre.

It was during this time that Cox narrowly avoided boarding the ill-fated British European Airways flight from Edinburgh to London that crashed on landing at Heathrow Airport on 27 October 1965. Cox had been invited to meet with Sir Laurence Olivier but the meeting was cancelled, and while Cox considered taking the flight anyway, he decided to return home only learning of the tragedy the next day.

==== 1980s: Royal National Theatre ====
Cox is an accomplished Shakespearean actor, spending seasons with both the Royal Shakespeare Company and the Royal National Theatre in the 1980s and 1990s. In 1983, he portrayed the Duke of Burgundy in King Lear opposite Laurence Olivier in the title role. In 1984, he played the Royal Ulster Constabulary officer Inspector Nelson in the Royal Court's production of Rat in the Skull. He was subsequently awarded that year's Laurence Olivier Award for Best Actor in a New Play.

He made his Broadway debut in February 1985 as Edmund Darrell in Eugene O'Neill's Strange Interlude at the Nederlander Theatre for which he received his first British Theatre Association Drama Award for Best Actor. In May that year, he made his off-Broadway debut, reprising his role as Inspector Nelson, in Rat in the Skull at the Public Theater. He received two additional Laurence Olivier nominations for Misalliance (1984) and for Fashion (1988).

He won his second Laurence Olivier Award, this time as Best Actor in a Revival, for his performance as the title character in Titus Andronicus (1988). Cox later said that he considers his performance in Titus Andronicus the greatest he has ever given on stage. His performance as Petruchio in The Taming of The Shrew (1987) also garnered positive reviews and won him another British Theatre Association Drama Award for Best Actor.

==== 1990s: King Lear and St. Nicholas ====
Cox returned from some years teaching and directing at the Moscow Arts Theatre School to tour with the Royal National Theatre worldwide, delivering a highly acclaimed performance as the title role in King Lear (1990–1991). His account of the emotional and physical difficulties that came with playing King Lear's all-consuming role was detailed in The Lear Diaries (1995) which he authored. King Lear is one of Shakespeare's most difficult roles, and Cox's portrayal broke new ground in the understanding of this most enigmatic figure.

In 1995, he directed Open Air Theatre's chilling adaptation of Richard III which was well received by critics. During the same season, he also appeared in one of the theatre's productions, The Music Man, as Professor Harold Hill.

In 1997, he starred in Conor McPherson's St. Nicholas at the Bush Theatre in London, and in 1998 returned to the off-Broadway stage reprising his role for Primary Stages, where he won a Lucille Lortel Award and earned a Drama Desk and an Outer Critics Circle nomination for his New York performance. In the same year, he played Marc in the Broadway production of Art.

==== 2000–2019: Return to Broadway ====
In 2000, Cox reunited with award-winning playwright Conor McPherson on The Royal Court Theatre's production of Dublin Carol in which he starred as grim alcoholic undertaker John Plunkett. In 2004, he played the title character in Uncle Varick for the Royal Lyceum Theatre in Edinburgh. In 2005, he starred in The Ride Down Mt. Morgan in Los Angeles for the Los Angeles Theatre Works.

From 2006 to 2007, he starred as Max at London's West End production of Tom Stoppard's Rock 'n Roll, a role he reprised on Broadway until 2008. In 2011, Cox appeared on Broadway opposite in a revival of Jason Miller's That Championship Season. His portrayal of Jack in The Weir at the Donmar Theatre in April 2013 is reprised at Wyndham's Theatre in January 2014. In Fall 2015, Cox starred in a new production of Waiting for Godot, for Royal Lyceum Theatre Edinburgh's 50th anniversary. In 2016, he became co-artistic director of the Mirror Theater Ltd. Cox returned to the Broadway stage in 2019 to star as Lyndon B. Johnson in Robert Schenkkan's The Great Society at the Vivian Beaumont Theater. In 2020, he directed the UK premiere of Joshua Sobol's Sinners — The English Professor. Cox has also previously directed I Love My Life, Mrs. Warren's Profession, The Philanderer, The Master Builder, The Crucible, and Julius Caesar on stage.

=== Film and television ===
==== 1965–1989: Early work ====
Cox made his first television appearance as Nelson in an episode of The Wednesday Play in 1965. He made one-off appearances in Redcap, ITV Playhouse and The Gamblers, before taking a lead role in The Year of the Sex Olympics in 1968. His first film appearance was as Leon Trotsky in Nicholas and Alexandra in 1971. In 1978 he played King Henry II of England in the acclaimed BBC2 drama serial The Devil's Crown, then starred in many other television dramas. He played the lead role in Dalhousie's Luck, a drama by Fulton Mackay set at the time of the siege of Aberdeen by the Marquess of Montrose in 1644 and broadcast as part of the BBC's Play for Today series on 3 August 1980. In the same year, he appeared in the ITV serial Hammer House of Horror as an ex-convict alongside veteran actor Peter Cushing. In 1981, he starred opposite Kate Nelligan and Alan Rickman in the BBC adaptation of Zola's novel Thérèse Raquin as Laurent LeClaire.

In 1986, he portrayed Hannibal Lecter in Manhunter, the character's first appearance on film.

==== 1990–1999: Career breakthrough ====
In 1990, Cox portrayed Andrew Neil in Secret Weapon, based on Mordechai Vanunu's life story. In the same year, he guest-starred as Father Amedy in the comedy series Perfect Scoundrels and starred as police investigator Kerrigan in the political thriller Hidden Agenda. In 1991, he played the role of Owen Benjamin, the closeted father of a gay man, in the BBC production of David Leavitt's novel, The Lost Language of Cranes, which is set in the 1980s. For his performance he was nominated as Best Actor at the 1993 BAFTA TV Awards. He also played Geoffrey Harrison in the ITV thriller Red Fox based on Gerald Seymour's international best-seller. In 1992, he appeared in another ITV adaptation as Carl May in The Cloning of Joanna May based on Fay Weldon's sci-fi novel. He also appeared as Stefan Szabo in the first episode of the fifth season of Van der Valk. He played the title role in the short film The Cutter and "The Director" in BBC's anthology series of classic and contemporary plays Performance. He also starred as Carlton Heard in Deceptions and as Edward Hoyland in The Big Battalions, a series about three religious families of differing faith.

In 1993, he appeared as spymaster Major Hogan in two episodes of Sharpe, and as Brother Shaw in Sean's Show. He played P.O. Garvey in BBC's anthology series Scene featuring plays and documentaries originally broadcast for educational purposes. In the same year, he was seen in an episode of Inspector Morse, where he portrayed Michael Steppings, a retired bookmaker whose daughter is in a permanent coma. In 1994, he appeared alongside Kevin Spacey as Angus Mcleague in Iron Will. He portrayed Aethelwine alongside Christian Bale and Helen Mirren in Royal Deceit, an adaptation of the Danish legend of Prince Amleth. He also played the role of Colonel Grushko, 'a policeman who sees greed and rapacity in Russia's new mood', in Grushko, a British-made crime drama set in Russia. He then starred in The Negotiator as Charlie King, a "street copper" who had a heart attack.

He shot to superstardom in the mid-1990s thanks to roles in the likes of Rob Roy as Killearn and Braveheart as Argyle Wallace in 1995. His performance in the former earned him a BAFTA Scotland Award nomination for Best Actor. In 1996, he starred with Helen McRory as Judge Freisler in Witness Against Hitler which tells the true story of a Prussian intelligence officer and aristocrat who, with his fellow devout Christians, plotted to assassinate Hitler. In the same year he played Lyman Earl Collier, a murderous CEO in Chain Reaction. He also appeared with Steven Seagal in The Glimmer Man as the CIA superior Mr Smith, and with Samuel L. Jackson in The Long Kiss Goodnight as Nathan Waldman.

Cox made a guest appearance in the 1997 Red Dwarf episode "Stoke Me a Clipper", as a medieval king in a virtual reality game. In the same year, he appeared alongside Morgan Freeman in the neo-noir psychological thriller Kiss the Girls based on James Patterson's best-selling novel. He also played Nye Bevan in the drama Food for Ravens and ranking IRA member Joe Hamill in the Irish sports drama The Boxer alongside Daniel Day-Lewis. In 1998, he appeared as police captain Jeremiah Cassidy in Desperate Measures, Uncle Vladimir in the romantic comedy Merchants of Venus, Clayton Blackstone in HBO's neo-noir film Poodle Springs, and in the drama Family Brood.

That same year he appeared alongside Bill Murray in Wes Anderson's Rushmore as the school headmaster Dr. Nelson Guggenheim. The film is preserved by the Library of Congress in 2016 due to its cultural, historical, and aesthetic significance. In 1999, he appeared opposite Owen Wilson as postal worker Doug Durwin in the thriller The Minus Man. He also played Sean Wallace in The Corruptor alongside Chow Yun-Fat and Mark Wahlberg, and appeared as Gary Wheeler in the sports drama For Love of the Game. His New York theatre credits include St. Nicholas (1999), which earned him a Drama Desk Award nomination.

==== 2000–2005: Franchise films ====
In 2000, Cox portrayed Lord Morton in Longitude, a dramatisation of Dava Sobel's book. He starred as the title character in The Invention of Dr. Morel, who invents a VR machine as a duplicate of the woman he loved. He also starred opposite Jonny Lee Miller as Inspector McDunn in Complicity, and as Sidney McLoughlin in the romantic comedy Mad About Mambo. He won an Emmy Award as Best Supporting Actor and was nominated for a Golden Globe Award as Best Actor for his portrayal of Hermann Göring in Nuremberg. He appeared in the Irish drama Saltwater as George Beneventi, a chip-shop-owning father troubled by loan sharks.

In 2001, he played the fatherly police Captain O'Hagan in Super Troopers. In the same year, he received critical acclaim for his performance as the paedophile Big John Harrigan in Michael Cuesta's L.I.E., winning a Satellite Award for Best Actor in Motion Picture Drama, and receiving nominations for the Independent Spirit Award for Best Lead Actor and the AFI Award for Featured Male Actor of the Year. In Strictly Sinatra, he played mob enforcer Chisolm who helps an aspiring musician passionate on Frank Sinatra. He also portrayed Baron de Breteuil in The Affair of the Necklace based on the diamond necklace incident that fuelled dissent against the French monarchy and led to the French Revolution.

In 2002, Cox appeared in A Shot at Glory as Rangers manager Martin Smith. He starred as Cyr in Bug in which a diverse group is propelled to a common fate by a series of cause-and-effect chain reactions. He played Jim Morris Sr. in the sports drama The Rookie, based on the true story of Jim Morris. In the same year, he guest-starred as Harry Moon in two episodes of the critically acclaimed series Frasier, for which he would receive an Emmy nomination as Outstanding Guest Actor in a Comedy Series. He then starred as corrupt CIA official Ward Abbott in the blockbuster film The Bourne Identity, opposite Matt Damon. He appeared as Michael O'Mara in The Biographer, and also starred as Richard Morgan in the supernatural horror thriller The Ring, a remake of the 1998 Japanese film. It was one of the highest grossing horror remakes, paving the way for other English-version horror remakes. He played Edward Norton's father James Brogan in 25th Hour, and also appeared in Spike Jonze's Adaptation as the real-life screenwriting teacher, Robert McKee, giving advice to Nicolas Cage in both his roles as Charlie Kaufman and Charlie's fictional twin brother, Donald. He shared a Screen Actors Guild Award nomination as part of the ensemble cast of the latter.

In 2003, he played the villain William Stryker in X2: X-Men United and Captain Oakes in the direct-to-video crime thriller Sin. In 2004, he played Tobias in The Reckoning, a murder mystery drama set in the medieval period. Also in 2004, Cox played an alternate, villainous version of King Agamemnon opposite Brad Pitt in Troy. He also reprised his role as Ward Abbott in The Bourne Supremacy, the second instalment of the Bourne franchise. In the short film Get the Picture, he played Harry Sondheim, a journalist who doubts the guilt of four suspected terrorists. He portrayed King Lear in episode 4 of season 6 of French and Saunders, BBC's sketch comedy series as satire to popular culture. He was honoured at the 2004 BAFTA Scotland Awards with an Outstanding Achievement Award, and at the 2004 Great Scot Awards with a Lifetime Achievement Award.

In 2005, Cox starred as Robert Smith in Blue/Orange, a BBC film adaptation of Joe Penhall's play exploring race, mental illness, and modern British life. He played Alec Hewett, patriarch of the wealthy family in Woody Allen's psychological thriller Match Point. He also played Rachel McAdams' father Joe Reisert in Red Eye. In the biographical drama The Strange Case of Sherlock Holmes & Arthur Conan Doyle, he portrayed Doyle's mentor Dr. Joseph Bell. The television film explored how Doyle created Holmes and how he applied Bell's techniques in his novels. In the sports comedy The Ringer, he played Gary Barker who suggests to his nephew to enter and fix a Special Olympics to solve their financial woes.

==== 2006–2010 ====
In 2006, Cox played Dr Hunt in A Woman in Winter which explores the nature of obsessive love. In The Flying Scotsman, based on the life of Scottish amateur cyclist Graeme Obree, he portrayed Douglas Baxter, a boatyard owner and minister who befriends the atheist cyclist. He appeared as Jack Langrishe in the HBO series Deadwood. In ITV's The Outsiders, he played Gabriel, the head of the spy agency. In the comedy drama Running with Scissors, based on Augusten Burroughs' best-selling memoir about his childhood, he portrayed Dr Finch, the psychiatrist of Burroughs's mother and patriarch of an eccentric family with whom Burrough was sent to live.

In 2007, Cox portrayed prominent US lawyer Melvin Belli in David Fincher's mystery thriller Zodiac, based on Robert Graysmith's book which follows the manhunt for the Zodiac Killer. He also played old Angus in the fantasy drama The Water Horse, Mr Kreeg in the anthology horror Trick 'r Treat, Daniel Tennant in Shoot on Sight based on Operation Kratos, and Drosselmeyer in The Secret of the Nutcracker.

In 2008 Cox starred as Avery Ludlow in Red, and also played institutionalised convict Frank Perry, the protagonist in Rupert Wyatt's film, The Escapist (2008), appearing alongside Joseph Fiennes, Dominic Cooper, and Damian Lewis. For the latter, he won that year's BAFTA Scotland Award for Best Acting Performance. In 2009, he appeared as Lewis Serrocold in the ITV series Marple, loosely based on Agatha Christie's books and short stories. He starred as Philip Van Doren in the Ridley Scott produced Tell-Tale, a film based on the short story The Tell Tale Heart by Edgar Allan Poe. He starred as the legendary criminal godfather Ozzy in The Take, and portrayed King Vesper Abaddon, the former king of Carmel in Kings, loosely based on the biblical King David and set in a modern absolute monarchy. He also starred as the short-tempered bartender Jacques in the Icelandic film The Good Heart, and as Burt Macey in the crime drama Lost & Found. He also appeared as Dennis in The Day of the Triffids, based on John Wyndham's best-selling post-apocalyptic novel.

In 2010, he played Reverend Kalahan, cult leader and pastor whose death is the backdrop of the story in the crime thriller As Good as Dead. He portrayed former Speaker of the House of Commons Michael Martin in the television film On Expenses. He also starred as Wally, an old rogue who fulfills his old friend's dying wish for a sea burial in the black comedy All at Sea. In the same year, Cox played Laura Linney's father in the Showtime series The Big C, and appeared as Ivan Simonov in RED.

==== 2011–2017 ====
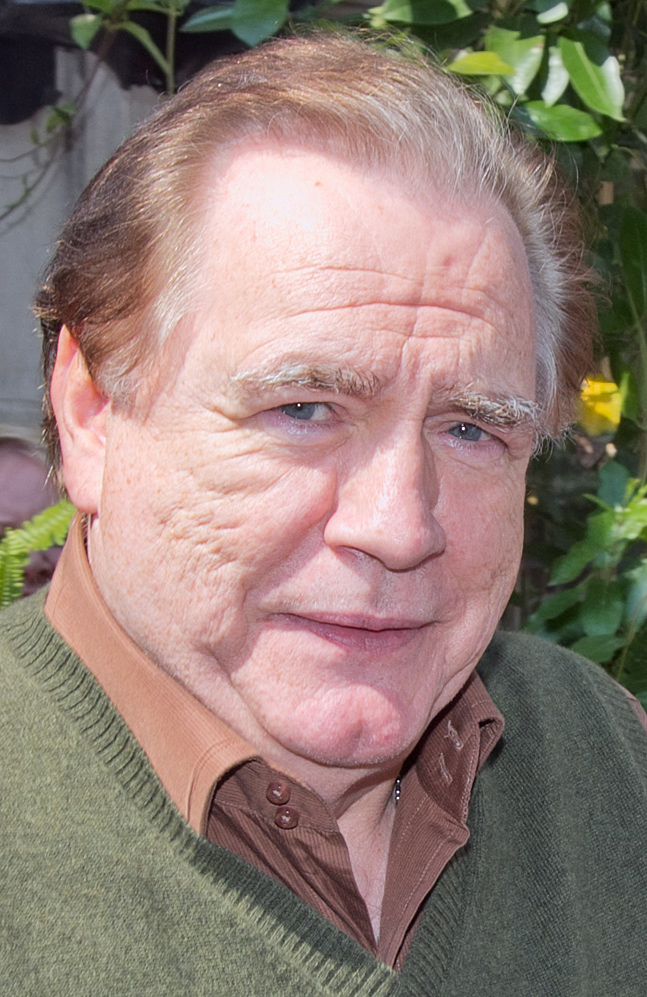
Cox at the 2011 Toronto International Film Festival

In 2011, Cox starred as Captain Rudolph Sharp in The Sinking of the Laconia, BBC Two's television film about the sinking of the British ocean liner RMS Laconia during World War II. He co-starred with Gerard Butler and Ralph Fiennes as a quietly reasonable senator in Coriolanus, a modern British film adaptation of the Shakespeare tragedy. He portrayed Baron William d'Aubigny, a lordly wool merchant against King John's tyranny in Ironclad, a war film set after the ratification of Magna Carta. In the American thriller The Key Man, he shared the screen with Hugo Weaving as Irving, a sociopathic con man and a Shakespearian actor. He then starred in The Veteran as a British intelligence officer who recruits a war veteran to track a female contact infiltrating a group of suspected terrorists. He also starred as John Landon in the science-fiction film Rise of the Planet of the Apes. He appeared as Glover Boyd, the retired policeman father of the protagonist in the Canadian biographical drama Citizen Gangster.

In 2012, Cox appeared in the Australian drama The Straits as the patriarch of the Montebello family crime syndicate, Harry Montebello. He appeared as Raymond Huggins, an associate of two corrupt businessmen brothers, in the political satire film The Campaign, and as Bill Ball in A Touch of Cloth, a parody of British police procedural dramas. He starred in Blood as Lenny Fairburn, a retired cop and father of two fraternal detectives played by Paul Bettany and Stephen Graham. He also appeared as an old man in the short film I Missed My Mother's Funeral.

In January 2013, Cox played the title character in the British comedy series Bob Servant. He said he played Servant, the creation of Dundonian author Neil Forsyth, based on memories of his late brother Charlie. He played Ivan Simanov in RED 2, reprising his role from the 2010 original film. In Blumenthal, he played the title role as the playwright Harold Blumenthal, who made a career out of parodying his family and died laughing at his own joke. He starred in Believe as the Scottish football manager Matt Busby, who returns from retirement to coach a group of young working-class boys. He also starred in the psychological thriller Mindscape (original title Anna) as Sebastian Cunningham, a superior in top memory detective agency Mindscape, which employs psychics to assist in solving criminal cases. He portrayed FBI director J. Edgar Hoover in The Curse of Edgar, an original docudrama based on the best-selling novel by Marc Dugain about Hoover's battle to keep power away from the Kennedys. In November 2013, he portrayed Canadian television executive Sydney Newman, the driving force behind the creation of Doctor Who, in the BBC television docudrama An Adventure in Space and Time. He appeared in Tooned, an animated cartoon about Formula One racing, as an old mechanic, and as Magnus Bain in the crime drama series Shetland (2013–2014) which was initially based on Ann Cleeves' novels.

In 2014, Cox appeared in The Anomaly as Lloyd Langham, Ian Somerhalder's father in the sci-fi thriller, who conducted nightmarish experiments on the protagonist. He also appeared in the documentary The Great War: The People's Story as Reverend Andrew Clark, and in BBC's Cold War spy thriller series The Game as an MI5 superior codenamed "Daddy". He also reprised his role in the second series of Bob Servant.

In 2015, he starred in The Slap, an American adaptation of the Australian series based on Christos Tsiolka's novel, as Manolis Apostolou, the father of the main character played by Peter Sarsgaard. He appeared in the sci-fi comedy Pixels as a military heavyweight starring alongside Adam Sandler, and in the Canadian revisionist western film Forsaken as a local gang leader. He also starred in the short film Killing Thyme as a grumpy old man with a squandered allotment and a death wish.

In 2016, he starred in the British-Hungarian comedy The Carer as Sir Michael Gifford, an ageing Shakespearian actor, and in the BBC's historical drama series adaptation of Leo Tolstoy's novel War & Peace as General Mikhail Kutuzov. He was nominated at the BAFTA Scotland Awards for Best Actor for his portrayal in the former. He also received a Career Achievement Award at the Stony Brook Film Festival for the same role. He appeared in season 3 of the horror drama series Penny Dreadful as Jared Talbot, a ruthless, powerful American rancher and the estranged father of Josh Hartnett's character. He also appeared in the sci-fi thriller Morgan as Jim Bryce, and starred alongside Emile Hirsch in The Autopsy of Jane Doe as Tommy. In the first series of the Italian-British historical drama series Medici, he portrayed Bernardo Guadagni, an officer of the Signoria.

In 2017, he appeared as Marlon Brando in Urban Myths, a biographical comedy drama series in which each episode features a story about popular culture icons. In June, Cox starred in the critically acclaimed historical war drama Churchill, playing the title role as Winston Churchill.

==== 2018–2023: Succession ====
In April 2018, Cox reprised his role of Captain John O'Hagen in Super Troopers 2. Early drafts of the script excluded Cox's character from the movie, with reservations on whether Cox would want to return or not for the sequel. It was later announced he would return, Cox himself joking that it was on the condition that he receive a "big action scene with rockets and explosions". In May, he starred in The Etruscan Smile as Rory MacNeil, a dying man who reunites with his estranged son. He starred in the first season of Succession, HBO's satirical drama which premiered to positive reviews, as Logan Roy, the patriarch of the dysfunctional Roy family and the billionaire founder of the global media and entertainment conglomerate Waystar RoyCo. In November, he starred as Henry in James Franco's drama Pretenders.

In June 2019, he played William "Bill" Erwin in Strange But True, a thriller adaptation of John Searles' novel. In August, he starred as Shane in the romantic comedy Remember Me. In the same month, the second season of Succession premiered in which Cox reprised his role, earning him the Golden Globe Award for Best Actor – Television Series Drama and a nomination for the Emmy Award for Best Lead Actor in a Drama Series. The series garnered critical acclaim receiving numerous awards and nominations, winning the British Academy Television Award for Best International Programme, the Golden Globe Award for Best Television Series – Drama, and the Primetime Emmy Award for Outstanding Drama Series. In the same year, he played Father Reilly in the comedy drama The Last Right.

In 2020, Cox starred as Gilles in the American neo-noir thriller Last Moment of Clarity. In The Bay of Silence, he played Milton Hunter, a powerful art dealer and stepfather to a celebrated artist. In 2021, he played Paul Rivers in the horror film Separation.

In July 2021, it was announced that Cox would join the cast of the family drama Prisoner's Daughter which tells the story of an ex-con trying to reconnect with his daughter and grandson. The film was released at the 2022 Toronto International Film Festival to mixed critical reviews, with Cox's performance praised as one of the highlights. He also did voice work for the animated short-film Wittgenstein's Poker as Bertrand Russell.

==== Recent projects ====
In November 2020, it was announced that Cox would be joining the cast of the "audio movie series" Unsinkable, told in eleven 20-minute episodes based on the oil tanker MV San Demetrio, set on fire by a German battleship in 1940; the crew was ordered to abandon ship, but reboarded the burning vessel two days later and with no charts or radio sailed her to Britain.

He was executive producer of and starred in the 2022 American drama film Mending the Line. He plays a Vietnam veteran who teaches a young injured soldier how to fly fish, hoping it would help him cope with his physical and emotional trauma. He stars in the 2022 political thriller The Independent, which centres on a young journalist who teams up with her idol (Cox) to uncover a major conspiracy.

Cox appears in the 2024 films Skelly and provided the voice of Helm Hammerhand in the animated film The Lord of the Rings: The War of the Rohirrim.

In 2023 he played the lead role of Johann Sebastian Bach in Oliver Cotton's play The Score at the Theatre Royal, Bath, directed by Trevor Nunn. The production and cast transferred to the Theatre Royal, Haymarket in 2025.

In 2025, he return to the Scottish stage for the first time in a decade to perform in James Graham's play Make It Happen, in the role of Adam Smith. While in Edinburgh for this role, Cox also participated in a fundraiser for the Edinburgh Fringe Festival in his capacity as a Fringe Ambassador.

== Audio and voice work ==
=== Film and television ===
Cox narrated in the short film Zulu 9 (2001), the short film The Legend of Loch Lomond (2001), the docudrama Smallpox (2002), and the short film The Martyr's Crown (2007). He provided live-action narration for the television miniseries Terry Pratchett's The Colour of Magic (2008). He voiced Malcolm Young in Exit Humanity (2011) which follows a man's battle with the walking dead in post-Civil War America. In 2017, he narrated the multi award-winning short film Kubrick by Candlelight which takes place behind the scenes of Stanley Kubrick's film Barry Lyndon. In 2018, he provided the opening narration for the horror film Dark Highlands. In 2019, he was The Voice in A Modern Magician, a supernatural black comedy short film based on William Olaf Stapledon's story exploring mental health, morality, perception, and desire.

He was the voice of the Ood Elder in part one of the Doctor Who Christmas special, "The End of Time" (2009), the narrator in the pseudo-scientific documentary The Revelation of the Pyramids, supporting antisemitic and negationnist conspiracy theories (2010), Bob Servant in Neil Forsyth's The Bob Servant Emails: Series 1 (2012), The Mastermind in the action series M.I. High (2013), Alan Watts in the award-winning sci-fi romantic drama Her (2013), Chorus in Arkangel Shakespeare's dramatised recording of Shakespeare's Henry V (2014), and Death in Good Omens (2019).

From 2020 to 2021, he voice-acted in the sci-fi series From Now as Hunter, the formerly identical brother of Richard Madden's character. He voiced Augustus in Neil Gaiman's The Sandman: Act II (2021), the second instalment of Audible's New York Times best-selling original. He is set to star in Lawrence: After Arabia, a retelling of the events that led to the enigmatic death of the famed T. E. Lawrence.

=== Radio ===
Cox's radio work include roles in multiple BBC/BBC Radio 4 productions such as the title character in the series McLevy (1999–ongoing), based on the real-life detective James McLevy, Alec Leamas in The Spy Who Came in from the Cold (2009), John Bernard Books in the dramatisation of The Shootist (2018), and a talking head in the impressions show Dead Ringers: Series 18 (2018). He also narrated in the epic full-cast drama The Stuarts (2019) and in Alexander: The Story of a Legendary Leader (2020).

=== Books ===
Cox narrated the abridged audiobook version of John Aubrey's Brief Lives (1995), Joseph Conrad's novellas Youth and Heart of Darkness (1996), and Sir Walter Scott's Ivanhoe (2001). He read the unabridged audiobook version of Bram Stoker's Dracula (1997), Ruth Rendell's To Fear a Painted Devil (2014), William McIlvanney's The Dark Remains book series, and his own autobiography Putting the Rabbit in the Hat (2021). He also voiced in Murder Most Foul (Vol. 1), a collection of classic crime short fiction, and in its sequel Murder Most Foul (Vol. 2) both in 2003.

He has collaborated with HarperCollins on an audiobook of Tolkien's epic poem The Legend of Sigurd and Gudrún (2010), and on the abridged audiobook version of Gerald Seymour's 2011 works including The Fighting Man, The Heart of Danger, The Journeyman Tailor, The Glory Boys, Red Fox, Killing Ground, Condition Black, and Field of Blood. In 2012, he read Penguin Classics' audiobook version of H.G. Wells' The Time Machine, and in 2014, The Human Table by Marvin Cohen in WordTheatre's Pushcart Prize: Best of the Small Presses (Vol. 2). He narrated The Gospel of John (2014), the first ever word for word film adaptation of all four gospels, and in religious audiobooks for The New Testament such as RSV-CE's Truth & Life Dramatized Audio Bible (2020) and The Word of God Audio Bible (2021).

=== Animation ===
Cox also worked in animation, providing the voice of Macbeth in Shakespeare: The Animated Tales (1992), Earl Garver in Superman: The Animated Series (1996), Pariah Dark in Danny Phantom (2005), General Hemmer in Battle for Terra (2007), Spanners in Agent Crush (2008), the Green Dragon in the direct-to-video film Scooby-Doo! and the Samurai Sword (2009), Action 12 Reporter in Wes Anderson's Fantastic Mr. Fox (2009), and Conrad and Crunch in the UK and US version of Bob the Builder: Mega Machines (2017). Cox narrated the first episode of the first series of Animated Tales of the World (2000). In 2018, he voiced Mr Widdershins, a gentleman whose life is pampered by automated machines, in Widdershins. He voices the English version of Niander Wallace Sr. in the Japanese-American animated series Blade Runner: Black Lotus (2021) based on the Blade Runner franchise. He also portrayed Helm Hammerhand in the animated film The Lord of the Rings: The War of the Rohirrim (2024).

=== Video games ===
Cox has also been involved in the video game industry. He voice-acted the ruthless emperor Scolar Visari in Killzone (2004), and its two sequels, Killzone 2 (2009) and Killzone 3 (2011). He was also the voice of Lionel Starkweather, the main antagonist in Manhunt (2003), a video game for Microsoft Windows, PlayStation 2 and Xbox. In Electronic Arts' reboot of Syndicate (2012), Cox played Jack Denham, the "ruthless power behind the boardroom throne" of the malicious corporation EuroCorp. The game was released on PlayStation 3, PC and Xbox 360. He's been featured in promotional material for the game Tekken 8 in which he recounts major events of the franchise's story leading up to its latest release focusing on the father and son showdown between Kazuya Mishima and Jin Kazama.

=== Television advertisements ===
He provided the voiceover for Virgin TV's cross-platform advertising campaign promoting its new streamlined service, Virgin TV Anywhere, in January 2017. Cox has also voiced TV ads for McDonald's since 2020. In April 2021, he provided voiceovers for TV ads for the launch of the online property portal Boomin. In 2024, Cox worked with Uber One for Students to make their debut ad campaign "Brian Cox Goes to College", which earned Uber Eats a Primetime Emmy Award for Outstanding Commercial in 2025. In 2025, Cox teamed up with drinks brand, Malibu, in a TV ad campaign pledging the importance of a work-life balance.

=== Soundtrack ===
Cox also performed soundtracks in a few of his projects. In the series Sharpe in the episode "Sharpe's Rifles" (1993), he sang Here's Adieu to all Judges and Juries. In L.I.E. (2001), he performed Danny Boy and Harrigan Song. He also sang The Butcher Boy in The Escapist.

== Acting credits and accolades ==
Cox made his directorial debut in the "Gray Matter" episode of the hit HBO prison drama series Oz (2000). His first foray into executive production was in The Escapist (2008). He also served as executive producer in the series From Now (2020–2021) and is set to executive produce Mending the Line.

He has received numerous accolades including two British Academy Scotland Awards, an Emmy Award, a Golden Globe Award, a Screen Actors Guild Award and two Olivier Awards. He has received two Olivier Awards for his performances in Rat in the Skull (1984), and Titus Andronicus (1988). For his role as Logan Roy in the HBO drama series Succession he has received a Screen Actors Guild Award, a Golden Globe Award and nominations for three Primetime Emmy Awards and a British Academy Scotland Award.

== Personal life ==
=== Marriages and family ===
Cox is divorced from both his first wife, Lilian Monroe-Carr, and his second wife, Caroline Burt. Cox and Burt have two children, Margaret and Alan; the latter is also an actor, best known for his roles in Young Sherlock Holmes, and as the young John Mortimer in the television film of his play A Voyage Round My Father (1982) opposite Laurence Olivier. Cox married his third wife, actress Nicole Ansari, in 2002. They have two sons, Orson Jonathan Cox and Torin Kamran Cox, and as of June 2010 lived in New York City.

=== Political and other views ===
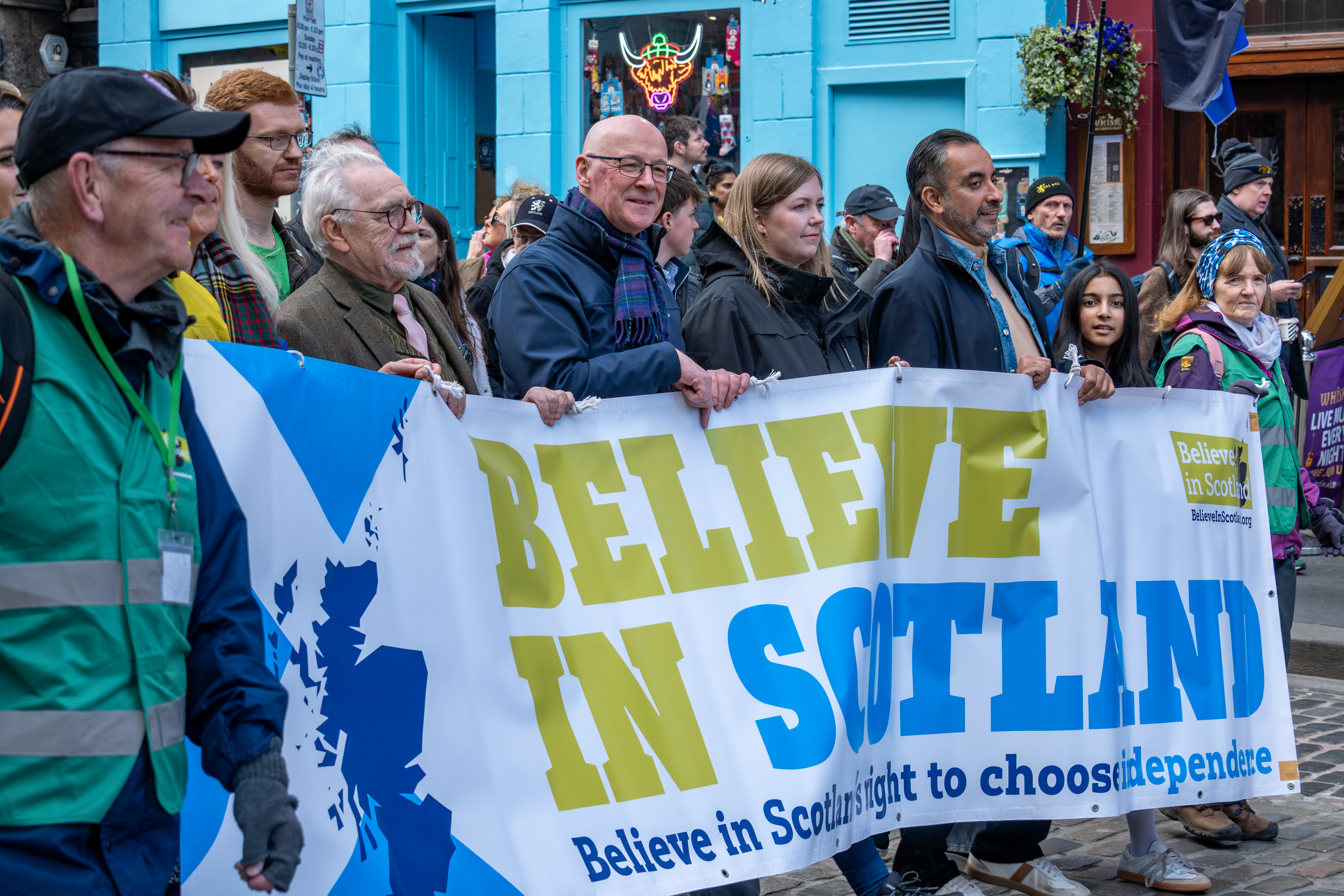
Cox participating in a Scottish independence march in 2026

Cox is a self-proclaimed democratic socialist and Scottish republican. In 2007, he campaigned for the Scottish Labour Party in the run-up to that year's Scottish Parliament election. Cox endorsed the Scottish National Party (SNP) in the 2011 Parliament election because of their higher education policy. In 2020, Cox told former Labour Party strategist Alastair Campbell that he had been an active and committed Labour supporter all his life until the controversial decision under Tony Blair's premiership to involve the UK in the Iraq War.

On 25 May 2012, he spoke in support of Scottish independence at the Yes Scotland campaign, saying he had gradually become disillusioned by New Labour under Tony Blair and Gordon Brown, although Cox could not vote in the 2014 Scottish independence referendum due to his residence in the United States. On 29 January 2015, Cox announced he had quit Labour under Ed Miliband and Jim Murphy, believing it had failed north and south of the border to live up to its basic principles in recent years, and joined the SNP, whom he felt was taking forward values of social justice and representing Scotland's best interests.

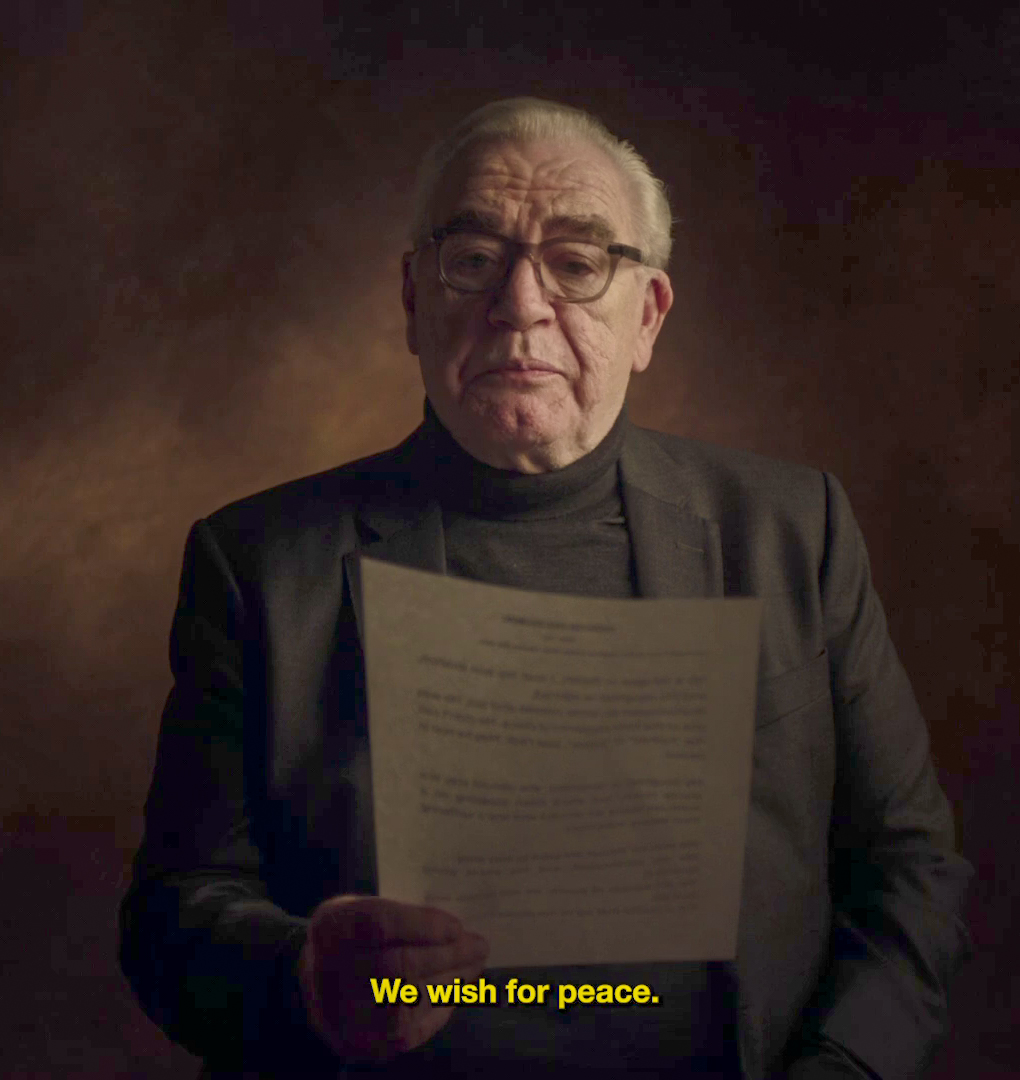
Cox participating in a plea to end the Gaza war in 2024

In January 2020, Cox called for a second referendum on Scottish independence, saying Labour had "failed" in Scotland and that the Scottish people were "organically" moving towards a decision to leave the UK following Brexit. In October 2020, he acknowledged that he was unlikely to ever return to living in Scotland, citing the weather. In November 2022, Cox insisted that he did not consider himself a Scottish nationalist and described himself as an Anglophile, but believed too many political decisions were being made on Scotland's behalf. Cox also said he favoured a move towards federalism and constitutional change in the United Kingdom over Scottish independence, commenting, "I don't want to break up the Union but I want another idea for the Union", which he described as "independent states but we come together as a united federation".

In October 2022, Cox criticised Conservative prime minister Liz Truss in the wake of the September 2022 United Kingdom mini-budget. Cox asserted the Conservatives had "no vision" and that he did not believe Truss "is the right person for the job". During the 2021 Israel–Palestine crisis, Cox signed his name in support of "A Letter Against Apartheid" written by six Palestinian artists. After the Gaza war broke out in October 2023, Cox signed another letter (Artists4Ceasefire) calling for a ceasefire. He later recorded himself reading the poem "If I Must Die" by Refaat Alareer, a Palestinian writer and professor killed by an Israeli airstrike. In 2025, Cox signed a letter prior to the 2025 Cannes Film Festival criticising the film industry's "passivity" during the ongoing Gaza genocide. In September 2025, he signed an open pledge with Film Workers for Palestine pledging not to work with Israeli film institutions "that are implicated in genocide and apartheid against the Palestinian people."

Cox revealed in an interview to The Guardian that he supported the recreational use of cannabis: "It's absolutely great and I recommend it to everyone—get stoned!"

=== Football ===
Cox is the cousin of late Dundee defender Bobby Cox. In 2025, he narrated a promotional film calling for a new stadium for the club; regardless, Cox does not support either Dundee or their city rivals, Dundee United. In an interview with The Athletic, Cox mentioned that he has been a supporter of Manchester United since childhood. The 1958 Munich air disaster had a deep, lasting impact on him as a young boy which has led him to support the club ever since.

== Honours and other recognition ==
On 31 December 2002, Cox was appointed a Commander of the Order of the British Empire in the New Year Honours List.

He was honoured at the 2004 BAFTA Scotland Awards with an Outstanding Achievement Award, and at the 2004 Great Scot Awards with a Lifetime Achievement Award.

Empire magazine awarded him the Empire Icon Award in 2006, and the UK Film Council named him one of the top 10 powerful British film stars in Hollywood in 2007.

In 1993, Cox was made an Honorary Doctor of Laws honoris causa by the University of Dundee. In 2006, he was conferred an Honorary Doctorate of Drama by the Royal Conservatoire of Scotland. In July 2007, he was made an Honorary Doctor of Letters by Queen Margaret University in Edinburgh, and was made an Honorary Doctor of Drama by Napier University in Edinburgh in July 2008. In November 2011, he was named an Honorary Doctor of Letters by Kingston University in southwest London for his tireless contributions to drama education.

In February 2010, Cox was elected as the 12th Rector of the University of Dundee by its students, was formally installed in October, and was re-elected in January 2013.

In December 2018 he was appointed head of the international jury at the Golden Unicorn Awards.

In June 2026, Cox received the Raindance Icon Award at the Raindance Film Festival.

Awards and honours
Year	Country or organization	Award	Ref.
1994	University of Dundee	Doctor of Laws honoris causa	
2002	United Kingdom	Commander of the Order of the British Empire	
2006	Royal Conservatoire of Scotland	Honorary Doctorate of Drama	
2007	Queen Margaret University	Honorary Doctor of Letters	
2008	Napier University	Honorary Doctor of Drama	
2011	Kingston University	Honorary Doctor of Letters	

== Charity work ==
Cox is a patron of the Scottish Youth Theatre, Scotland's national theatre "for and by" young people. Scottish Youth Theatre's building in Glasgow, The Old Sheriff Court, named their theatre the Brian Cox Studio Theatre in his honour. He is also a patron of "THE SPACE", a training facility for actors and dancers in his native Dundee, and an ambassador for the Screen Academy Scotland, a collaboration between Napier University and the Edinburgh College of Art. Cox is also patron of The Old Rep Theatre in Birmingham, one of the first repertory theatres to be built in the UK. In October 2017, he was made an honorary patron for Capital Theatre's campaign to modernise the historic King's Theatre Edinburgh and preserve it for future generations. In January 2020, he was removed from patronage of the Mid-Lin Daycare Centre, a centre for the elderly in Dundee, after serving for four years due to his confession of his use and endorsement of recreational cannabis. In April 2020, he became patron of the British American Drama Academy with whom he has had a decades-long association, including directing several collaborations and holding regular Masterclasses for participants on BADA's programs.

In April 2010, Cox, along with Ian McKellen and Eleanor Bron, appeared in a series of TV advertisements to support Age UK, the charity formed from the merger of Age Concern and Help the Aged. In 2012, Cox became the Grand Marshal of the New York City Tartan Day Parade and reprised the role in 2020, the first time a previous Grand Marshal was asked to return since the parade moved to Manhattan's Sixth Avenue. In June 2005, he was awarded the first Scotland's Tartan Day International Ambassador Award at a ceremony in the Scottish Parliament for his work in promoting Scotland abroad.

== Bibliography ==
He has authored three books: Salem to Moscow: An Actors Odyssey, The Lear Diaries, and his autobiography Putting the Rabbit in the Hat.

Salem to Moscow: An Actors Odyssey spans 30 years in British theatre, beginning in the 1980s, when Cox, despite success on both sides of the Atlantic, was looking for a new sense of purpose for his life and work which culminates having first directed The Crucible at the Moscow Art Theatre School.

In The Lear Diaries, Cox accounts how a group of leading actors approach a major text, providing insight into the pressures that contemporary theatre actors face. He describes the emotional and physical difficulties that came with playing King Lear while also working as a member of an ensemble playing roles in Richard III. His diary also reveals the personal strains of touring, particularly the difficulties of being separated from his family during the company's year-long tour.

Cox credits a remark from fellow actor Oliver Cotton during the production as resulting in the title of his autobiography Putting The Rabbit In The Hat published in 2021.

- Cox, Brian (1992, Methuen London). Salem to Moscow: An Actors Odyssey. Methuen Drama. ISBN 978-0-413-66450-1
- Cox, Brian (1992, Methuen London). The Lear Diaries: The Story of the Royal National Theatre's Productions of Shakespeare's Richard III and King Lear. Methuen Drama. ISBN 978-0-413-69880-3, 0-413-64970-9
- Cox, Brian (2021, Quercus). Putting the Rabbit in the Hat. Quercus Publishing. ISBN 978-1-5294-1649-7

== See also ==
- List of actors in Royal Shakespeare Company productions
- List of Royal National Theatre Company actors

Academic offices
Preceded by Craig Murray	Rector of the University of Dundee; 2010–2016	Succeeded by Mark Beaumont
