= David Ashton (actor) =

Scottish actor and writer

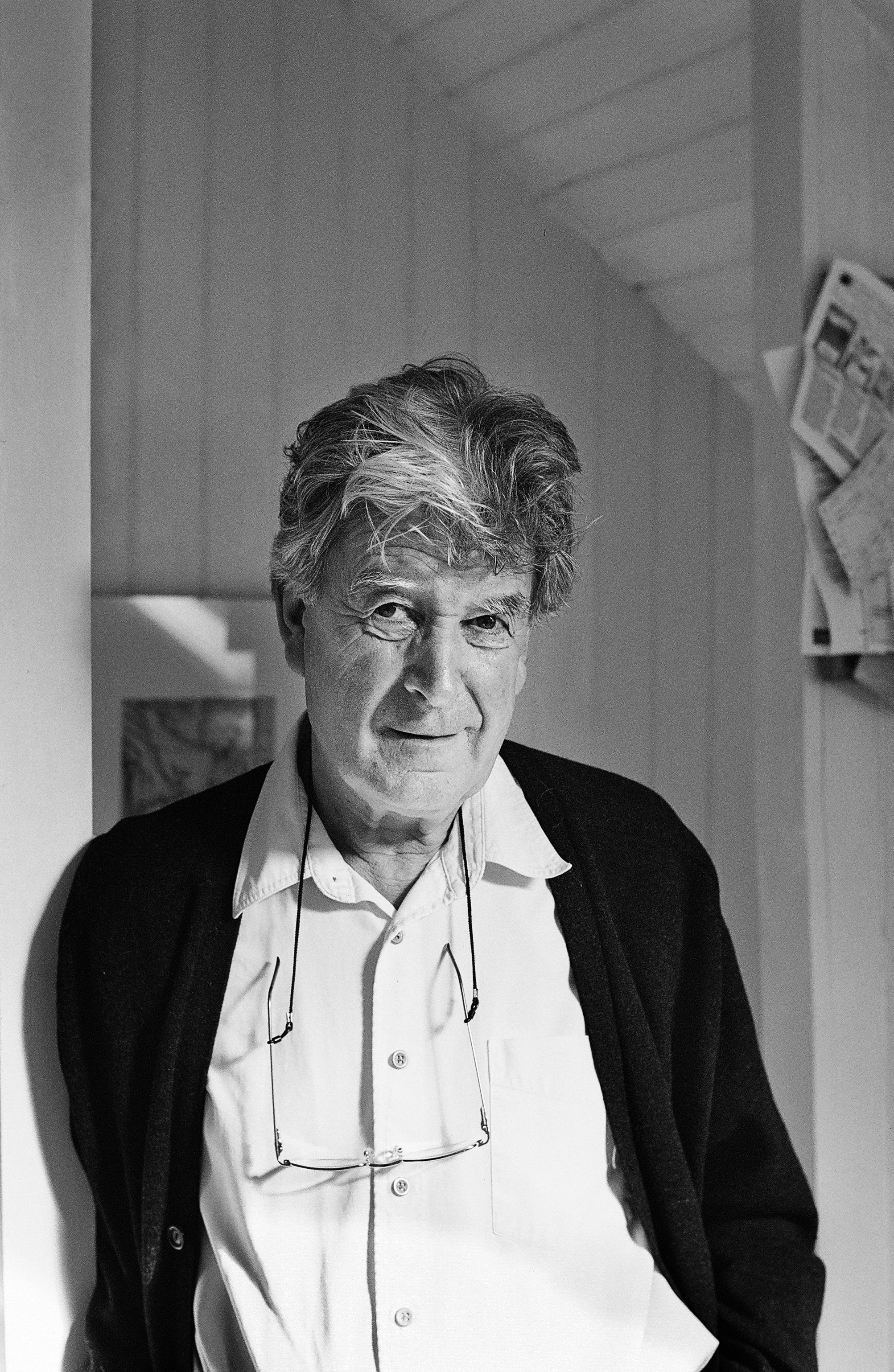
David Ashton

David Scott Ashton (born David Scott; 10 November 1941, Greenock, Scotland) is a Scottish actor and writer. Trained at the Central School of Speech and Drama in London, 1964–67, he has acted in a wide variety of film, television, theatre and radio roles. He has also developed a parallel career as a writer of fiction, film and television screenplays and plays for theatre and radio. His radio play The Old Ladies at the Zoo, which starred Peggy Mount and Liz Smith, won the Radio Times Drama Award in 1985.

== Acting ==
=== Theatre ===
Ashton started his professional career at Worcester Repertory theatre, playing roles such as Marco in A View from the Bridge, Jerry in Two for the Seesaw, Harold Gorringe in Black Comedy, and Charlie in Staircase. At Ipswich Rep, he played Bluntschli in Arms and the Man and Seamas Shields in The Shadow of a Gunman. Other roles included Grigory Smirnov in Chekhov's The Bear at the Orange Tree Theatre, London; The Tramp in Synge's In the Shadow of the Glen, Joxer in Juno and the Paycock, Torvald in Ibsen's A Doll's House at the Crucible Theatre, Sheffield, the lead in Jean-Claude Carrière’s The File at the Liverpool Playhouse; Gayev in The Cherry Orchard and then Kulyegin in The Three Sisters at the Royal Exchange Theatre, Manchester.

At the Royal Court Theatre, London, he played John in Christopher Hampton's The Philanthropist with Alec McCowan, and also appeared in the West End musical Happy as a Sandbag at the Ambassadors Theatre and portrayed Mister Mulleady in Behan's The Hostage at Greenwich Theatre. Most recently, he appeared as Sandy Sheridan in Uncle Varick, John Byrne’s version of Chekhov's Uncle Vanya, at the Royal Lyceum Theatre, Edinburgh.

He has also taught, directed and lectured at the Central School of Speech and Drama, Rose Bruford College, the London Academy of Music and Dramatic Art and the Mountview Academy of Theatre Arts.

=== Film ===
- 1981: Eye of the Needle - Oban Radio Operator
- 1986: Just Us - Parramatta Warder
- 1992: Freddie as F.R.O.7 - Additional Voices
- 1996: Indian Summer - Paris Mourner
- 1997: Tomorrow Never Dies - First Sea Lord
- 1998: Stiff Upper Lips - Dr. Henry
- 2000: The House of Mirth - Lawyer
- 2003: Winter Solstice
- 2006: The Last King of Scotland - Dr. Garrigan - Senior
- 2009: The Silent Cormorant

=== Television ===
Ashton made his acting debut on television in Z-Cars (1969) and took the lead role as Aeneas MacMaster in The New Road (1973). Other main roles include Lieutenant Wickham in The Voyage of Charles Darwin (1978); Mr. Fraser in the BBC Scotland produced drama Maggie (1981–1982); Doctor MacDuff in Brass, a social comedy series, set in 1930s Northern England (1982–1984 & 1990); Major Lennox in Sharpe’s Eagle (1993); Major Roddy Maclean in Hamish Macbeth (1995–97); Harold Xavier in Monarch of the Glen (2000); Alex Gemmell in Glasgow Kiss (2000) and Professor MacManus in Vital Signs (2006).

He has also had featured roles in New Tricks (2008); Waking the Dead (2002); Waterfront Beat (1991); All Creatures Great and Small (1990); The Bill (1989); Ever Decreasing Circles (1986); Doctor Who (as Kendron in the 1985 story Timelash); Coronation Street (1985); and Juliet Bravo (1980 - Series 1, ep.6 'The Runner').

== Writing ==
=== Film ===
- 1989 Duck: commissioned and broadcast by Channel 4 for its Short and Curlies series, starring Jim Carter and Frances Barber.
- 1990 God on the Rocks: an adaptation of the novel by Jane Gardam starring Minnie Driver and Bill Paterson, commissioned and broadcast by Channel 4 and made by Skreba Productions.
- 1992 Freddie as F.R.O.7: an animated musical fantasy adventure made by Hollywood Road productions and featuring the voices of Ben Kingsley, Jenny Agutter, Brian Blessed and Billie Whitelaw.

In addition, Ashton has written five commissioned scripts that have yet to go into full production:

- Taj: the love story behind the Taj Mahal commissioned by Sir Ben Kingsley's Lavender Films.
- Tale: a modern reworking of Shakespeare's The Winter's Tale, commissioned by film director Peter Chelsom (Hear My Song, Funnybones).
- Donal Q: a contemporary reinterpretation of Don Quixote, with Billy Connolly and Brian Cox, commissioned by Left Bank Pictures.
- Cousin Bazilio: Based on the novel by Portuguese author José Maria de Eça de Queirós, a tale of adultery, blackmail and lust set in 19th-century Lisbon. The script was commissioned by Lavender Films and is now with Trademark Films.
- Django: a drama about the dangers faced by Django Reinhardt, the great gypsy jazz guitarist, in occupied Paris during the Second World War.

=== Television ===
Ashton was one of the early scriptwriters for EastEnders, the long-running BBC soap opera that first aired in February 1985. He wrote for series two of BBC hospital drama Casualty, becoming main writer for series three (1987–88). His monologue Stations (1988), broadcast as part of the BBC's Play for One series, provided actor Andrew Keir with "a tour de force solo role" according to The Independent newspaper. Another one-off drama for BBC2 was The Other Side (1992), starring Frank Finlay and Richard E. Grant.

He wrote four episodes for series two of the BBC1 comedy-drama The Hello Girls (1996–98), as well as individual episodes of Badger (1999) , which featured Jerome Flynn as a police wildlife liaison officer, and Murder Rooms: The Dark Beginnings of Sherlock Holmes (2001), both for BBC1. A television series based on his McLevy radio series and novels is currently under development.

=== Radio ===
Ashton is best known as creator of the ongoing BBC Radio 4 drama series McLevy, based on the career of 19th-century Edinburgh detective James McLevy. A pilot episode was first broadcast in 1999 and twelve series of the Scottish thief-taker's exploits have followed up to 2016. The dramas star Brian Cox as McLevy, Siobhan Redmond as Jean Brash, Michael Perceval-Maxwell as Mulholland, and Ashton himself as Lieutenant Roach.

In addition, Ashton has written more than 15 other radio plays, including The Old Ladies at the Zoo (1985), starring Peggy Mount and Liz Smith, which won the Radio Times Drama Award that year, and three Sherlock Holmes adaptations: The Naval Treaty, Black Peter and The Three Garridebs for BBC Radio 4. These were part of the complete recording of the Sherlock Holmes canon broadcast by the BBC between 1989 and 1998 and starring Clive Merrison as Holmes and Michael Williams as Watson. Recent plays have included The White Hart and Me… Dancing for RTÉ in Dublin; No Help When Dead (2010) for BBC Scotland; Maidens' Trip (2010) for BBC Radio 4 and The Quest of Donal Q (2011), starring Billy Connolly and Brian Cox, for BBC Scotland and Radio 4.

=== Theatre ===
- 1988 Passing By: a trilogy at the Old Red Lion Theatre, Islington, directed by Dominic Dromgoole and starring Julie Covington.
- The Eagle: Traverse Theatre, Edinburgh.
- Stations: Traverse Theatre, Edinburgh and Tron Theatre, Glasgow.
- 1991 A Bright Light Shining: Bush Theatre, London, directed by Dominic Dromgoole, with John Hannah, Ewen Bremner and Joanna Roth.
- 1993 The Chinese Wolf: Bush Theatre, London, directed by Dominic Dromgoole, with Maureen Beattie and Desmond Barrit.
- 1994 The Mark: Cockpit Theatre, London.
- 1996 Buried Treasure: The Lyric Theatre (Hammersmith), directed by Robin Lefevre, with Alexander Morton and Jennifer Black.
- 1997 The Golden Door: a children's play performed at The National Theatre, London.
- 1998 Me Dancing: The Other Place, Stratford-upon-Avon.

His latest piece Couchsong, in which a therapist hauls her couch out into the garden and the story takes off from there, is yet to be performed.

=== Books ===
Ashton has chronicled further exploits of McLevy, the character first introduced on the radio, in a series of novels.

- 2006 The Shadow of the Serpent
- 2007 Fall from Grace
- 2009 A Trick of the Light
- 2013 Nor Will He Sleep

All are published by Polygon/Birlinn.
