= McLevy =

British radio drama series

- Other names: McLevy in the New World (2022-present)
- Genre: Crime drama
- Running time: 45 mins
- Country of origin: United Kingdom
- Language: English
- Home station: BBC Radio 4
- Syndicates: BBC Radio 4 Extra
- Starring: Brian Cox; Siobhan Redmond; Michael Perceval-Maxwell; David Ashton
- Written by: David Ashton
- Directed by: Bruce Young
- Produced by: Bruce Young
- Recording studio: BBC Pacific Quay, Glasgow
- Original release: 26 July 1999 – 1 February 2024
- No. of series: 14
- No. of episodes: 54
- Website: www.bbc.co.uk/programmes/b00ckq1r

McLevy is a British radio crime drama series, written by David Ashton, about the 19th century Edinburgh police detective James McLevy. Broadcast on BBC Radio 4 as part of its Afternoon Drama slot, the drama stars Brian Cox and Siobhan Redmond, with Michael Perceval-Maxwell and David Ashton.

== Main cast ==
- Inspector James McLevy, played by Brian Cox
- Jean Brash, played by Siobhan Redmond
- Constable Martin Mulholland, played by Michael Perceval-Maxwell (Series 1-12)
- Lieutenant Robert Roach, played by David Ashton (Series 1-12)

In the 1999 pilot play, Phyllis Logan played Jean and John Paul Hurley played Mulholland. Lieutenant Roach was not introduced until the actual first episode of Series One; in the pilot play, McLevy's superior was Lieutenant Moxey, with the change in command explained as Moxey having been "elevated" to The Haymarket (in the novel Shadow of the Serpent, the explanation is that Moxey "had left somewhat under a cloud and Roach had been swiftly drafted in from Haymarket to fill the gap ...").

== Supporting cast ==
- Jessie Nairn (2000–2002, played by Tracey Wiles), Jean Brash's right-hand woman and "Keeper of Keys" of "The Happy Land" and "The Just Land" until she was stabbed to death by a hired killer.
- Hannah Semple (2003–2012, 2015–2016, played by Collette O'Neil), who took over as Jean's "Keeper of Keys"; in Series 9, she had to flee Leith after killing a deranged sword-wielding "client" to protect Jean but returned in Series 11.
- Constable Miller (2000–2003, played by Tom Smith), a rather inept constable who was killed in the line of duty preventing an assassination attempt on Queen Victoria; unfortunately, to McLevy's fury, because of the would-be assassin's identity, higher authorities swept the attempt under the carpet and the "official" version of Miller's death was that he had been stabbed to death by "a sneak thief". His stationhouse duties were taken over after his death by Constable Ballantyne, played by Finlay McLean.
- "The Countess" (2002, played by Maureen Beattie, later 2024 by Nicole Ansari), Jean Brash's chief rival in the brothel trade. During a power struggle between herself and Jean, she tried to have Jean framed for murder but was ultimately jailed herself as an accomplice to that murder; it was revealed in Series 5 that she died in prison; however, in Series 2 of McLevy in the New World, she appeared in San Francisco after having escaped from Perth Penitentiary.
- Donald McIver (played by Andrew Neil), Hannah Semple's former boyfriend and an inveterate gambler who married Hannah in Series 5, but sadly was later shot and killed when a high-stakes card game he was playing in was held up by two men with a pistol.
- Inspector Adam Dunsmore of the Haymarket district (played by Simon Tait in Series 5, later Forbes Masson in Series 11), later transferred to Princes Street; McLevy despises him as both an inefficient investigator and being more interested in furthering his own career than in solving crimes.
- Chief Constable Murray Craddock (introduced in Series 10, played in Series 10 and 12 by Paul Young and by David Robb in Series 11), a self-righteous and intolerant man who is determined to purge Edinburgh (and especially Leith) of what he considers immorality (McLevy finally demonstrates how he feels about Craddock in the final episode of Series 12, "The Last Goodbye").

== Format ==
While some of the series contain a thread connecting all of that series' stories into one storyline, the elements of each of the stories remain constant:

- McLevy's single-minded pursuit of and for justice on his beat (the parish of Leith in the city of Edinburgh) no matter which class of people are involved;
- His frustration with and contempt for "respectability" and its hypocrisy, especially when the truth about a crime is covered up to protect upper-class people involved but a crime committed by lower-class people is severely punished;
- His often-stormy but complex (and in Series 10 "intimate" following events at the end of Series 7) relationship with Jean Brash, the owner and operator of "The Happy Land" (until it was burned down by vigilantes) and later "The Just Land" (so named to annoy McLevy), the "best bawdy-hoose" (brothel) in Edinburgh;
- His equally complex working relationship (and friendship, although neither would ever admit to it) with Irish-born Constable Mulholland, McLevy's partner in investigations;
- His clashes with his long-suffering, class- and politically-conscious and wife-dominated superior Lieutenant Roach (who nevertheless realized that McLevy's methods produced the desired results and therefore was not above turning a blind eye and occasionally even backing McLevy).

The historicity of the series is not always faultless. For example, an episode on 24 March 2015 involved a robbery of the British Linen Bank, although that bank did not obtain that title until 1906.

== List of episodes ==
=== Series 1 ===
Episode no.	Broadcast date	Episode title
1	21/12/2000	For Unto Us
2	28/12/2000	The Trophy Club
3	04/01/2001	The Second Shadow
4	11/01/2001	The Burning Question

=== Series 2 ===
Episode no.	Broadcast date	Episode title
1	19/06/2002	A Good Walk Spoilt
2	26/06/2002	Wild Justice
3	03/07/2002	The Wild Spark
4	10/07/2002	Stab in the Back

=== Series 3 ===
Episode no.	Broadcast date	Episode title
1	01/12/2003	Behind the Curtain
2	08/12/2003	A Voice from the Grave
3	15/12/2003	The Dark Shadow
4	22/12/2003	Servant of the Crown

=== Series 4 ===
Episode no.	Broadcast date	Episode title
1	03/04/2006	A Piece of Cake
2	10/04/2006	The Sea Change
3	17/04/2006	Sins of the Fathers
4	24/04/2006	The Devil's Disguise

=== Series 5 ===
Episode no.	Broadcast date	Episode title
1	27/01/2009	To Keep Him Honest
2	03/02/2009	Picture of Innocence
3	10/02/2009	The Chosen One
4	17/02/2009	The Reckoning

=== Series 6 ===
Episode no.	Broadcast date	Episode title
1	21/12/2009	A Bolt From the Blue
2	28/12/2009	End of the Line
3	04/01/2010	Jack O'Diamonds
4	11/01/2010	Queen of Spades

=== Series 7 ===
Episode no.	Broadcast date	Episode title
1	02/03/2011	The Firebrand
2	09/03/2011	Dead Reckoning
3	16/03/2011	Prince of Darkness
4	23/03/2011	A Distant Death

=== Series 8 ===
Episode no.	Broadcast date	Episode title
1	29/11/2011	The Blue Gown
2	06/12/2011	Flesh and Blood
3	13/12/2011	A Fine Deception
4	20/12/2011	The Last Illusion

=== Series 9 ===
Episode no.	Broadcast date	Episode title
1	26/11/2012	A Dangerous Remedy
2	03/12/2012	No Looking Back
3	10/12/2012	A Pearl in the Oyster
4	17/12/2012	The Cross-Roads

=== Series 10 ===
Episode no.	Broadcast date	Episode title
1	18/02/2014	A Different Path
2	25/02/2014	The Cat's Claw
3	04/03/2014	A Sore Convulsion
4	11/03/2014	A Secret Life

=== Series 11 ===
Episode no.	Broadcast date	Episode title
1	15/12/2015	A Price to Pay
2	22/12/2015	The Seventh Veil
3	29/12/2015	The Night Walker
4	05/01/2016	The Devil Makes a Move

=== Series 12 ===
Episode no.	Broadcast date	Episode title
1	10/10/2016	A Matter of Balance
2	11/10/2016	A Man of Honour
3	12/10/2016	He Who Waits
4	13/10/2016	The Last Goodbye

=== McLevy in the New World - Series 1 ===
Episode no.	Broadcast date	Episode title
1	21/04/2022	Shake Hands With The Devil
2	28/04/2022	A Stirring In The Blood

=== McLevy in the New World - Series 2 ===
Episode no.	Broadcast date	Episode title
1	25/01/2024	Fate Takes A Hand
2	01/02/2024	Fire Burn and Cauldron Bubble

=== McLevy in the New World - Series 3 ===
Episode no.	Broadcast date	Episode title
1	24/06/2025	Deep Waters
2	01/07/2025	Names in the Dust

=== Specials ===
Broadcast date	Episode title	Notes
26/07/1999	Pilot episode	Originally titled 'McLevy', it was retitled 'Happy Land' for subsequent repeats.
25/12/2006	Christmas Special	90-minute feature-length episode.
08/10/2016	Meet James McLevy	60-minute re-make of the pilot episode, with "Lieutenant Roach" taking the place of "Lieutenant Moxey" and "Hannah Semple" taking a more prominent role in the story.

== In other media ==
All episodes of series 1-12 are currently available on both CD, audio download and with the exception of the pilot episode can be listened to for free on BBC Sounds.

=== Literature ===
Ashton has penned four novels featuring McLevy: The Shadow of the Serpent (2006), Fall from Grace (2007), A Trick of the Light (2009) and Nor Will He Sleep (2013). He has also published an additional two books featuring Jean Brash as the main protagonist: Mistress of the Just Land (2016) and The Lost Daughter (2017).
