= Dublin Carol =

Dublin Carol is a play by Conor McPherson, which premiered in London at the Royal Court Theatre in 2000.

== Plot ==
John, a middle-aged employee of a funeral home in Dublin, returns from a funeral on Christmas Eve with Mark, a 20-year-old who has helped out that day. John tells his sad history about how he has destroyed much of his life and damaged his family, through drink. Mary, John's grown daughter, who hasn't seen her father in 10 years, arrives to tell him that her mother, his long-estranged wife, is dying.

== Productions ==
The play was produced in London at the Royal Court Theatre Jerwood Theatre Downstairs from February 2000 to 18 March 2000. Directed by Ian Rickson, the cast starred Brian Cox (John Plunkett), Bronagh Gallagher (Mary) and Andrew Scott (Mark).

Dublin Carol opened Off-Broadway at the Atlantic Theater Company running from 20 February 2003 to 6 April 2003. The play was directed by Conor McPherson with the cast that starred Keith Nobbs, Jim Norton and Amy Ryan. The play was nominated for the 2003 Lucille Lortel Award, Best Play, and Jim Norton won the 2003 Obie Award, Performance.

Dublin Carol was produced by the Steppenwolf Theatre Company, Chicago, Illinois, from 6 November 2008 to 4 January 2009. The cast starred William Petersen (John), Nicole Wiesner (Mary) and Stephen Louis Grush (Mark), and was directed by Amy Morton.
