= The Revelation of the Pyramids =

- DVD cover
- French: La révélation des pyramides
- Directed by: Patrice Pooyard
- Written by: Jacques Grimault; Olivier Krasker-Rosen; Patrice Pooyard
- Narrated by: Brian Cox
- Release date: 10 February 2010
- Running time: 106 minutes
- Country: France
- Languages: French; English; German

The Revelation of the Pyramids (French: La révélation des pyramides) is a pseudo-scientific documentary directed by Patrice Pooyard and released in 2010, then widely disseminated on the Internet from 2012 until 2023 when the film was pulled down from YouTube. Written by Patrice Pooyard and Jacques Grimault, the film highlights pseudo-historical theories put forward by the latter.

== Description ==
The film presents the view of Jacques Grimault's unpublished works about the construction of the Pyramids of Giza and other ancient archaeological sites around the world.

His main point is that there is a slow cycle of geological changes on Earth, including the change of the magnetic poles, which cause great catastrophes about every 26 000 years, and he believes there was another human civilisation before ours which was destroyed by such catastrophes. Pyramids and other ancient buildings were built by them, and the Pyramids of Giza were not primarily tombs, but rather a mathematical riddle, its answer being a warning of this cycle. Grimault views the current global warming as a forerunner of these catastrophic events.

=== Alignment of sites ===
The film claims that the Giza pyramid complex are aligned on a "leaning equator" of 30 degrees from the traditional equator, along with other archaeological sites : Easter Island, Machu Picchu, Ollantaytambo, the Paracas civilization, the Dogon country and Mohenjo-daro, so as to be placed equidistant from the magnetic poles of the earth.

== Reception ==
According to journalist Paul Conge, "Grimault implicitly uses a racial motif" behind his pseudoscientific theses and defends negationist theories.

The film's poor scientific credulity was widely denounced by experts. Jacques Grimault did not accept the criticism and was charged in 2023 with harassment against a young archeology scholar.
