= James McLevy =

Detective in Edinburgh and crime author

James McLevy (1796–1873) was a detective in Edinburgh during the mid-19th century, and later an author of popular crime mysteries.

== Biography ==
The son of a farmer, he was born in Ballymacnab in County Armagh, Ireland. McLevy later moved to Edinburgh, Scotland, and became a builder's labourer before joining the police force in 1830.

In 1833 he became Edinburgh's first detective and handled 2,220 cases during his 30-year career, almost always securing a conviction. His fame was such that the UK Parliament asked for his advice on dealing with criminals and Mary Carpenter, the great social reformer, quoted him in her paper on dealing with convicts.

McLevy published a series of extremely popular books in the 1860s, including Curiosities of Crime in Edinburgh, Sliding Scale of Life and The Disclosures of a Detective. It is sometimes suggested that his writings helped to inspire Arthur Conan Doyle. McLevy sought forensic advice from members of the medical faculty at the University of Edinburgh, where Conan Doyle later studied.

McLevy died in Edinburgh on 6 December 1873.

In the late 1990s, the James McLevy Trophy, named after him, was donated by former Detective Superintendent John McGowan to recognise outstanding achievement in crime detection in Scotland.

== In popular culture ==
=== Radio ===
As part of its Afternoon Drama programme, BBC Radio 4 has broadcast twelve series of dramas written by David Ashton and starring Brian Cox as McLevy, Siobhan Redmond as Jean Brash, Michael Perceval-Maxwell as Constable Martin Mulholland and David Ashton as Lieutenant Robert Roach.

All episodes of each series are currently available on both CD and audio download.

=== Books ===
David Ashton has continued McLevy's story in his 2006 book Shadow of the Serpent (ISBN 978-1846971938); following volumes include Fall From Grace (2007) (ISBN 978-1-84697-050-4), Trick of the Light (2009) (ISBN 978-1846972027), featuring a young Arthur Conan Doyle, and most recently Nor Shall He Sleep (2012) (ISBN 978-1846972515), featuring Robert Louis Stevenson; all four novels are currently available in audio download format, read by David Ashton. McLevy's "nemesis" Jean Brash currently has two mysteries of her own to solve, with McLevy in a supporting role: Mistress of the Just Land (ISBN 978-1473632271) and The Lost Daughter (ISBN 978-1473632295), both currently available in both paperback and e-book format as well as audio recordings narrated by Siobhan Redmond.

McLevy also appears in “The Way of All Flesh” by Ambrose Parry ISBN 978-1786893802.

=== Short stories ===
Two short stories, "No Rest for the Wicked" and "A Child is Born", were published in The Scotsman. Two more short stories, "End of the Line" and "The Painted Lady", are available for purchase in Amazon Kindle e-book format. All of these are also by David Ashton.
