= Emmy Award for Best Lead Actor in a Drama =

Emmy Award for Best Lead Actor in a Drama may refer to the following Emmy Awards:

- Primetime Emmy Award for Outstanding Lead Actor in a Drama Series
- Daytime Emmy Award for Outstanding Lead Actor in a Drama Series
- International Emmy Award for Best Actor
