= Rupert Wyatt =

English filmmaker

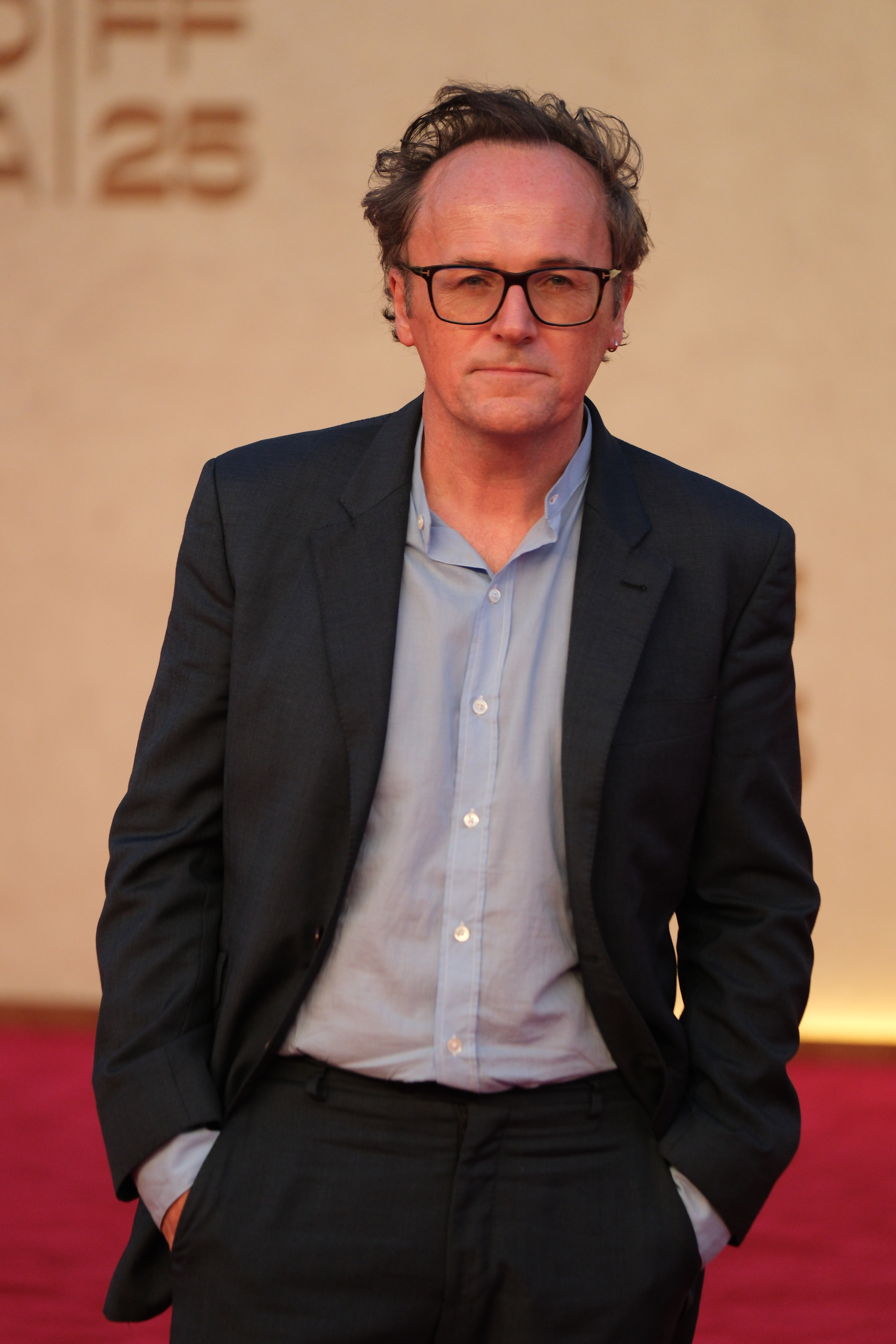
- Wyatt in 2025.
- Born: Rupert Alexander Perry Wyatt; 26 October 1972 (age 53); Guildford, Surrey, England
- Education: Winchester College, Dragon School
- Occupations: Director; screenwriter; cinematographer; producer
- Years active: 1999–present
- Spouses: Erica Beeney (m. 2009; div. 2023); Pamela Berkovic (m. 2026)
- Children: 3

Rupert Wyatt (born 26 October 1972) is an English filmmaker. He made his directorial debut with the 2008 film The Escapist, which premiered at the Sundance Film Festival. His second film was the 2011 blockbuster Rise of the Planet of the Apes. His later directorial endeavors have included the 2014 crime drama The Gambler, the 2019 sci-fi film Captive State, and the first two episodes of the television adaptation of The Mosquito Coast in 2021. He also has served as an executive producer on the series.

== Early life ==
Wyatt was born and raised near Winchester in Hampshire. He was educated at the Dragon School, Oxford and Winchester College, Winchester.

== Career ==
=== Producing ===
Wyatt is the founder of the film collective Picture Farm, which has produced numerous shorts, documentaries and features, including the Sundance Award-winning documentary Dark Days.

=== Directing ===
He also co-wrote and directed the British prison escape thriller The Escapist (2008), starring Brian Cox, Damian Lewis, Dominic Cooper, Joseph Fiennes, Seu Jorge, Steven Mackintosh and Liam Cunningham. The film premiered at the Sundance Film Festival in January 2008, was nominated for eight international film awards, and was the winner of two. In March 2010, he was selected to direct Rise of the Planet of the Apes, a reboot of the Planet of the Apes franchise, which was based on a screenplay by Rick Jaffa and Amanda Silver. The film was released on 5 August 2011 to mostly positive reviews and grossed more than $481 million worldwide.

Wyatt was to be the director of 20th Century Fox's X-Men spin-off film Gambit, to be released on 7 October 2016, but dropped out due to scheduling conflicts.

He directed the 2019 sci-fi film Captive State.

His most recent film is the animated feature The Sunrise File. which premiered in competition at the Annecy Film Festival in June 2026 The film starred Brian Cox, Diane Kruger, Yvan Attal and Geza Rohrig.

== Personal life ==
Wyatt is married to photographer Pamela Berkovic and currently lives between New York City and Hudson, New York with his three children.

== Filmography ==
Short film

Year	Title	Director	Writer	Producer
1999	Ticks	Yes	Yes	Yes
2004	Get the Picture	Yes	Yes	No

=== Feature film ===
Year	Title	Director	Writer	Notes
2003	Subterrain	Yes	Yes	
2008	The Escapist	Yes	Yes	
2011	Rise of the Planet of the Apes	Yes	No	
2014	The Gambler	Yes	No	Also music supervisor
2019	Captive State	Yes	Yes	Also producer
2025	Desert Warrior	Yes	Yes	

Executive producer

- Fishing Without Nets (2014)
- Desert Warrior (2025)
- Animal Farm (2025)

=== Television ===
Year	Title	Director	Executive Producer	Notes
2014	Turn: Washington's Spies	Yes	No	Episode "Pilot"
2016	The Exorcist	Yes	Yes	Episode "Pilot"
2021	The Mosquito Coast	Yes	Yes	2 episodes

== Awards and nominations ==
Year	Title	Award/Nomination
2008	The Escapist	Nominated – British Independent Film – Douglas Hickox Award; Nominated – Evening Standard British Award for Most Promising Newcomer; Nominated – London Critics Film Award for Breakthrough British Filmmaker
2011	Rise of the Planet of the Apes	Nominated – Empire Award for Best Director; Nominated – Saturn Award for Best Director
