= The Carer (film) =

2016 film

- Directed by: János Edelényi
- Written by: János Edelényi; Gilbert Adair
- Starring: Coco König; Brian Cox
- Release date: 3 January 2016 (PSIFF)
- Running time: 89 minutes
- Countries: United Kingdom; Hungary
- Language: English

The Carer is a 2016 British-Hungarian comedy film directed by János Edelényi.

== Plot ==
Young Hungarian home care assistant Dorottya (Coco König) looks after aging Shakespearian actor Sir Michael Gifford (Brian Cox).

== Cast ==
- Coco König - Dorottya
- Brian Cox - Sir Michael Gifford
- Maitland Chandler - Freddy
- Ruth Posner - Dolly
- Selina Cadell - Mrs. Trudeau
- Andor Lukáts - Uncle Ferenczi
- Roger Moore - Himself
