= The Escapist (2008 film) =

- Official poster
- Directed by: Rupert Wyatt
- Written by: Rupert Wyatt; Daniel Hardy
- Produced by: Adrian Sturges; Alan Moloney
- Starring: Brian Cox; Joseph Fiennes; Liam Cunningham; Seu Jorge; Dominic Cooper; Steven Mackintosh; Damian Lewis
- Cinematography: Philipp Blaubach
- Edited by: Joe Walker
- Music by: Benjamin Wallfisch
- Distributed by: Vertigo Films
- Release date: 20 June 2008 (United Kingdom)
- Running time: 102 minutes
- Countries: United Kingdom; Ireland
- Language: English
- Box office: $388,174

The Escapist is a 2008 drama thriller film starring Brian Cox, Joseph Fiennes, Liam Cunningham, Seu Jorge, Dominic Cooper, Steven Mackintosh, Stephen Farrelly and Damian Lewis. It was directed and co-written by Rupert Wyatt and premiered at the 2008 Sundance Film Festival to considerable acclaim. An Irish-UK co-production, the film was produced by Alan Moloney of Parallel Films and Adrian Sturges of Picture Farm.

== Plot ==
The film runs two narratives simultaneously: the preparation for the escape and the escape itself.

Frank Perry (Brian Cox) is a lifer and has long accepted that he will never see the outside again. When Perry receives his first letter in fourteen years, informing him that his cherished daughter is a drug addict and near death following an overdose, he starts to think about escaping. He plans an escape with help from Lenny Drake (Joseph Fiennes), Brodie (Liam Cunningham) and Viv Batista (Seu Jorge). But when Perry's new cellmate James Lacey (Dominic Cooper) gets noticed by Tony (the brother of the powerful inmate Rizza), things get more complicated and lead to Tony's death. When Perry receives the bad news that his daughter has died his plans change.

Perry nears freedom, as he climbs towards a London Underground exit. The story snaps back to the prison where Perry is offering himself to be killed by Rizza for failing to bring Lacey to him for punishment. The escape scenes were Perry's hallucinations as he was dying, and he sacrificed himself to cause distraction, allowing the other prisoners to escape.

== Cast and characters ==
- Brian Cox as Frank Perry. A solid and phlegmatic character, he holds his own, but neither attracts nor creates any trouble. He is a lifer and has long accepted that he will never see the outside again.
- Damian Lewis as Rizza. A ruthless convict who rules over the other inmates.
- Joseph Fiennes as Lenny Drake. A former thief and boxer.
- Seu Jorge as Viv Batista. The prison chemist.
- Liam Cunningham as Brodie. Perry's right-hand man and closest friend.
- Stephen Farrelly (credited as Sheamus O'Shaunessy) as Two Ton. The prison's reigning bare-knuckle boxing champion.
- Dominic Cooper as Lacey. A newly arrived prisoner and Frank's cellmate.
- Steven Mackintosh as Tony. Brother of Rizza, drug-addled and the source of much conflict.

== Production ==
The film was financed by the UK Film Council and the Irish Film Board, and produced with the support of investment incentives for the Irish film industry provided by Irish government. It was co-produced by Parallel Films and Picture Farm. In an interview produced during the 2008 edition of the Sundance Film Festival, Rupert Wyatt heavily discusses the financial burden and stress for punctuality placed upon him while creating the film. When specifically asked on his approach to creating the film, Wyatt stated, "Make it on time, make it on budget, and make it good. That way you get to make another one."

=== Writing ===
The role of Frank Perry was written specifically for Brian Cox.

In an interview with Trevor Groth, Wyatt said "The structure of the film's plot was inspired by a well-known short story written in the 19th century by Ambrose Bierce called An Occurrence at Owl Creek Bridge."

=== Locations ===
Much of The Escapist was shot in Dublin's Kilmainham Gaol. A scene near the end is shot in the bascule chamber beneath Tower Bridge in London; it is exactly the same location where Wyatt's brother-in-law Boris Starling set the climax of his 2006 novel Visibility. The Kingsway tramway subway also features in the film.

=== Extras ===
The film is noted for featuring not only Irish WWE wrestler Sheamus (billed under his real name, Stephen Farrelly) in a main role but also future UFC star Conor McGregor as an extra playing a prisoner.

== Music ==
The film features Leonard Cohen's version of "The Partisan" and British band Coldplay who wrote an eponymous song for the film which features on the end credits and on their bestselling album Viva la Vida or Death and All His Friends as a hidden track.

== Release ==
The film premiered at the Sundance Film Festival on January 21, 2008. ThinkFilm had initially purchased North American distribution rights, but due to financial troubles, they ended up selling them to IFC Films. The film was released to on-demand platforms on April 1, 2009, followed by limited theatrical releases in New York and Los Angeles on April 3.

== Reception ==
=== Critical reception ===
The film received a rating of 67% on Rotten Tomatoes based on 45 reviews. The site's consensus: "A tense, smart prison break movie, The Escapist is a sharp debut from director Rupert Wyatt".

=== Box office ===
The North American box office total for the film was $13,439 with an additional $374,735 internationally for a worldwide total of $388,174.

=== Awards ===
==== Wins ====
- BAFTA Scotland Award for Best Film Performance 2008 (Brian Cox)
- British Independent Film Awards 2008 Best Production Achievement (Adrian Sturges and Alan Moloney)

==== Nominations ====
- British Independent Film Awards 2008 The Doulgas Hicox Award (Best Debut Director) (Rupert Wyatt)
- Irish Film and Television Awards 2008 Best Film (Adrian Sturges and Alan Moloney)
- World Soundtrack Award for Discovery of the Year 2008 (Benjamin Wallfisch)
- Evening Standard British Film Awards 2008 Most Promising Newcomer (Rupert Wyatt)
- Evening Standard British Film Awards 2008 Technical Achievement (Joe Walker)
- London Critics' Circle Film Awards 2008 Filmmaking Breakthrough (Rupert Wyatt)

== Remake ==
In 2015, it was announced that Liam Neeson will star in a remake with Wyatt as a producer.
