= Misalliance (play) =

Play by George Bernard Shaw

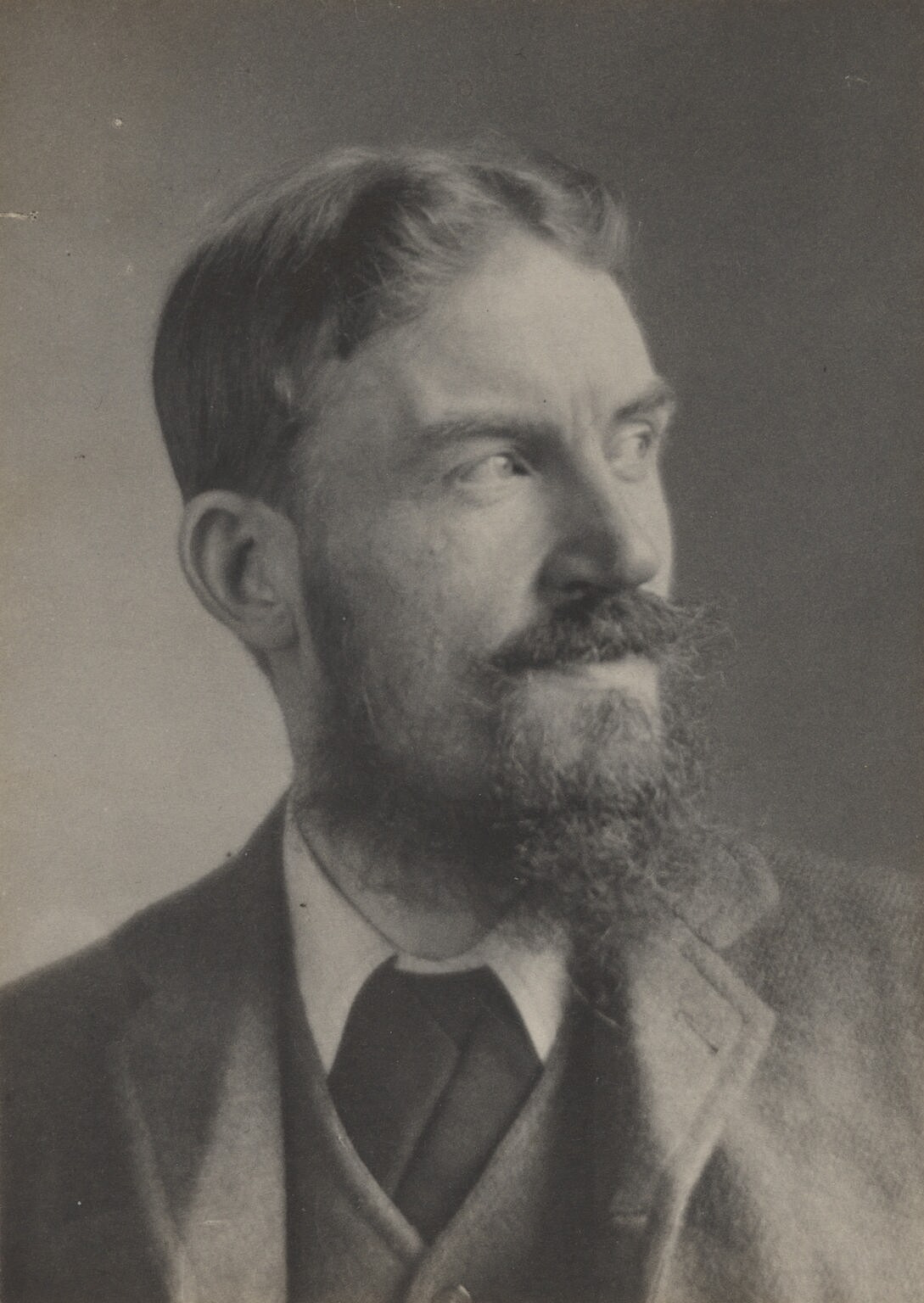
- George Bernard Shaw
- Written by: George Bernard Shaw
- Original language: English
- Subject: Odd goings on at a country house
- Genre: Satirical comedy
- Setting: A house in Surrey

Premiere
- Date premiered: 23 February 1910
- Place premiered: Duke of York's Repertory Theatre

Misalliance is a play written in 1909–1910 by George Bernard Shaw. The play takes place entirely on a single Saturday afternoon in the conservatory of a large country house in Hindhead, Surrey, in Edwardian era England.

Shaw subtitled his play A Debate in One Sitting, and in the program of its first presentation in 1910 inserting this note: "The debate takes place at the house of John Tarleton of Hindhead, Surrey, on 31 May 1909. As the debate is a long one, the curtain will be lowered twice. The audience is requested to excuse these interruptions, which are made solely for its convenience."

The Irish playwright Lennox Robinson assisted Shaw when he was directing the original London production of the play.

== Characters ==
- John Tarleton, Junr.
- Bentley Summerhays
- Hypatia Tarleton
- Mrs Tarleton
- Lord Summerhays
- John Tarleton
- Joseph Percival
- Lina Szczepanowska
- Julius Baker

== Plot ==
Misalliance is about a varied group of people gathered at a wealthy man's country home on a summer weekend. Most of the romantic interest centres on the host's daughter, Hypatia Tarleton, a heroine who exemplifies that in courtship, women are the relentless pursuers and men the apprehensively pursued.

Hypatia is the daughter of newly-wealthy John Tarleton who made his fortune in the unglamorous but lucrative underwear business. She is fed up with the stuffy conventions surrounding her and the hyperactive talk of the men in her life. Hypatia is engaged to Bentley Summerhays, an intellectually bright but physically and emotionally underdeveloped aristocrat.

Hypatia is restless with her engagement as the play starts, even as it is revealed she has also had a proposal of engagement from her betrothed's father, Lord Summerhays. She has no desire to be a nurse to the elderly and is in no hurry to be made a widow. Then an aircraft crashes through the roof of the conservatory to close the end of the first act.

At the beginning of Act II, it is revealed that the aircraft brings two unexpected guests. The pilot, Joey Percival, is a handsome young man who immediately arouses Hypatia's hunting instinct. The passenger, Lina Szczepanowska, is a Polish female daredevil and circus acrobat whose vitality and directness inflame all the other men at the house party.

An additional uninvited guest arrives in the form of Gunner. He is a cashier who is very unhappy with his lot in life. He blames the wealthy class for the plight of the ordinary worker, and he blames John Tarleton in particular for a romantic dalliance that he once had with Gunner's mother. Gunner arrives with intent to kill Tarleton but hides inside a piece of furniture. From this position, he becomes wise to Hypatia's pursuit of Percival. And when he emerges, he learns that there was no romantic liaison between his mother and Tarleton but that his mother was actually the premarital best friend of Mrs. Tarleton. His character introduces the themes of socialism to the play as well as questions the conventional views on marriage and social order.

Altogether there are eight marriage proposals offered for consideration in the course of one summer afternoon. The question of whether any one of these combinations of marriage might be an auspicious alliance, or a misalliance, prompts one of the prospective husbands to utter the famous Shavian speculation:

If marriages were made by putting all the men's names into one sack and the women's names into another, and having them taken out by a blindfolded child-like lottery number, there would be just as high a percentage of happy marriages as we have now.

Lina subsequently becomes the object of affection for Summerhays, Tarleton, Bentley, and Johnny. The affirmation of her role is her speech in which she rejects Johnny's offer of marriage in favor of retaining her independence, financially, intellectually, and physically. She takes Bentley, who finds a shaky new courage, up into the air with her at the conclusion of the play.

== Audio adaptations ==
The L.A. Theatre Works released an audio adaptation in 2004 (ISBN 978-158081-275-7) with Roger Rees as Lord Summerhays, Eric Stoltz as Johnny Tarleton, Victoria Tennant as Mrs. Tarleton, W. Morgan Sheppard as Mr. Tarleton, Joy Gregory as Hypatia, Tom Beyer as Bentley Summerhays, Tegan West as Joey Percival, Douglas Weston as Gunner/Julius Baker and Serena Scott Thomas as Lina Szczepanowska.
