= Kelly Vint Castro =

American actress, commercial print model, and personal relationship coach

- Born: Kelly Boone Vint; March 19, 1982 (age 44); Los Angeles, California, U.S.
- Occupation: Actress
- Years active: 1983–present
- Spouse: Rudy Castro (m. 2015)
- Parent(s): Susan Mullen; Alan Vint
- Website: kellyandrudy.com

Kelly Boone Vint-Castro (born March 19, 1982) is an American actress, commercial print model, and personal relationship coach. The daughter of actors Alan Vint and Susan Mullen, she began working as an actress at an early age and was a SAG member by time she was four years old, although, Vint-Castro's first formal acting job was at ten months old in a commercial.

== Acting career ==
=== Stargate ===
Vint-Castro's first major acting role in a film was in Stargate at eleven years old, playing the role of young Catherine Langford in the opening of the feature film in 1994, in which Catherine visits the Giza Plateau with her father in 1928.

=== Stargate Origins ===
Vint-Castro and Stargate Origins director, Mercedes Bryce Morgan, met while they were both working on another project in 2017. After the new Stargate series was announced at San Diego Comic-Con in July, 2017, Mercedes asked Vint-Castro to make a cameo appearance as an older Catherine Langford. Vint-Castro plays a woman working at a secret warehouse facility where the Stargate is being kept during Stargate Origins. She shares the screen with Origins' leads, Ellie Gall and Connor Trinneer, where Vint-Castro plays an older Catherine.

=== Thunder Alley ===
Vint-Castro's next acting role was on ABC's sitcom, Thunder Alley, playing Claudine Turner, the precocious granddaughter of Gil Jones, played by Edward Asner. The sitcom aired for 2 seasons in 1994-1995.

=== Reversal ===
Vint-Castro, who is credited under the name Kelly Boone in the film Reversal, portrays the secret girlfriend of high school wrestler Leo Leone, played by Danny Mousetis. The 2001 independent family feature is directed by Alan Vint, (Vint-Castro's father) and written by actor Jimi Petulla, who based the script on his own experiences as a high school wrestler. Reversal is the only film that Vint-Castro and her father ever worked on together.

== Commercial print acting and modeling ==
Vint-Castro works in the commercial print industry as an actress and model. Her first commercial work began when she was nine months old and throughout her childhood she appeared in national commercials for businesses such as McDonald's. Since 2016, Vint-Castro has appeared in national television commercials and print advertising with her husband, Rudy Castro, and their three children.

== Early life ==
Vint-Castro was born in Los Angeles, California into a family of actors. Her father Alan Vint acted in such films as Panic in Needle Park and The Deadly Tower and in a variety of TV Series such as, Hawaii Five-0, Bonanza, and Baretta. Her mother Susan (Sue) Mullen was a successful commercial actress who took Vint-Castro on auditions, which landed her roles in advertising commercials and acting opportunities. Vint-Castro is the niece of actor Jesse Vint.

== Conscious Partnership Coaching ==
In 2017, Vint-Castro and her husband, Rudy Castro, created "Conscious Partnership Coaching," in Los Angeles, California. They work with couples on a variety of topics pertaining to healthy relationships, hosting events internationally. They write a regular monthly column titled, "Matters of the Heart," in the non-profit addiction recovery publication, Keys To Recovery.

== Television ==
Television
Year	Title	Role	Notes
1994	TGIF (TV Series)	Claudine	Episode: dated 9/30/94"
1994-1995	Thunder Alley (TV Series)	Claudine Turner	Vint-Castro played the role of Claudine Turner for 2 Seasons/acting in all 27 Episodes
1996	Bless This House (TV Series)	Lucy	The Bowling Method
2000	Chicken Soup for the Soul (TV Series)	Friend	The Right Thing
2016	White Supremacy: Going Under (TV Movie Documentary)	Dave's Wife	
2016-2017	Hillbrook Gardens (TV Series)	Denise	5 Episodes
2018	Stargate Origins (TV Series Short)	American Agent Catherine Langford	Episode 1

== Film ==
Film
Year	Title	Role	Notes
1994	Stargate	Young Catherine Langford	Film Debut (Vint-Castro plays an older Catherine Langford in 2018 in Stargate Origins
1996	Space Jam	Little League Girl (As Kelly Vint)	
1999	Bellyfruit	Christina	
2001	Reversal	Shaw	Directed by Alan Vint, Vint-Castro's Late Father
2015	Head Space (Short)	Mom	
2016	Dust (Short)	Becky	
2018	Fruit Fly (Short)	Bethany	
2018	Black Crow White Lie (Short)	Friend	
2016	Paris Window	Space Girl	
