= Reversal (film) =

2001 film by Alan Vint

Reversal is a 2001 movie about a high school wrestler, written by Jimi Petulla and directed by Alan Vint.

== Synopsis ==
Reversal follows the life of Leo Leone, a gifted young wrestler growing up in a struggling Pennsylvania steel town. From the time he is a child, wrestling becomes the center of his life. His father, Ed Leone, a former wrestler himself, pushes Leo relentlessly in hopes that success in the sport will provide opportunities and a better future than the one available in their small town. Leo spends his childhood inside wrestling rooms, learning discipline, toughness, and sacrifice long before he ever experiences a normal teenage life.

As Leo grows into one of the top wrestlers in the state, the pressure surrounding him becomes overwhelming. His father’s demanding coaching style forces Leo through brutal workouts, strict diets, and dangerous weight cuts in pursuit of championships and college recognition. The constant strain of cutting weight begins taking a serious toll on Leo’s physical and mental health, leaving him exhausted, isolated, and emotionally drained. Wrestling consumes nearly every aspect of his identity, causing tension in his friendships and making it difficult for him to build normal relationships outside the sport.

During his senior year, Leo slowly starts questioning whether wrestling is truly what he wants for his future. As he begins spending more time outside the wrestling world and experiences parts of life he had long ignored, the relationship between him and his father continues to deteriorate. Ed refuses to accept that his son may want something different, while Leo grows increasingly frustrated with living under constant pressure and control. Their once-close bond becomes strained as the emotional burden of wrestling continues to affect every part of Leo’s life.

Complicating matters further is the arrival of Thurman Ellis Jr., a fierce and talented wrestler who challenges Leo for the varsity spot and becomes his biggest rival. The competition between the two pushes Leo physically and emotionally throughout the season. While Thurman remains fully committed to winning and advancing in wrestling, Leo’s passion for the sport continues fading as he realizes how much of his life has been sacrificed in pursuit of expectations that may not even be his own.

The film builds toward a final wrestle-off between Leo and Thurman for the starting position. Leo ultimately wins the match, proving he is still the better wrestler, but in a surprising decision he walks away from the sport afterward. Realizing wrestling no longer defines who he wants to be, Leo chooses freedom over championships and expectations. In the end, Ed finally understands the damage his obsession has caused and accepts his son’s decision, allowing Leo the chance to discover a future beyond wrestling.

== Cast ==
Danny Mousetis- Leo Leone

Derrick Nelson- Young Leo Leone

Jimi Petulla- Coach Ed Leone

Dawn Lafferty- Jessica Leone

Kelly Boone (Vint)- Shaw

Jeff Breese- Johnny

Justin Spates- Thurman Ellis Jr

Guido Fohrweiser- Thurman Ellis Sr

Kelly Boone (Vint), daughter of director Alan Vint, plays Leo Leone's secret girlfriend. Reversal is the only film they ever worked on together. The movie never made it to the mainstream public, however, it received vocal support from many leaders in the wrestling community such as Cael Sanderson and Kurt Angle.

The soundtrack was composed by Jeff Danna.
