= Nard =

Nard may refer to:

- 'Nard, a 1981 album by Bernard Wright
- Nard (game) (Persian: نرد), a Persian board game similar to backgammon
- Nard (plant), of the species Nardostachys jatamansi
  - Spikenard, an essential oil derived from the plant
- Nard, Croatia, a village near Valpovo
- The Nard, a nickname for the city of Oxnard, California, U.S.
- National Animal Rights Day
- National Association of Rudimental Drummers
- Nigerian Association of Resident Doctors

== Given name ==
- Nard Jones (1904–1972), American novelist
- Nard Ndoka (born 1963), Albanian politician
