= The Fall of America =

The Fall of America may refer to:

- The Fall of America: Poems of These States, a 1973 work by Allen Ginsburg
- The Fall of America and the Western World 2009 TV series by Brian Kraft
- The Fall of America, a 1973 book by Elijah Muhammad
