= Aylam Orian =

American actor

Aylam Orian is an American actor, who plays the role of Dr. Wilhelm Brücke, the high-ranking Nazi officer, occultist and series main antagonist, in the MGM limited series Stargate Origins (2018).

As a vegan and supporter of animal rights, Orian founded The National Animal Rights Day in the United States and dozens of other countries and wrote The Declaration of Animal Rights.
