= UN Convention on Animal Health and Protection =

UN Convention on Animal Health and Protection (UNCAHP) was a proposed convention on animal rights and welfare. It was launched as a campaign by the Global Animal Law Association (GAL) in 2019, which aims for the convention to be adopted by the United Nations General Assembly by 2029.

== See also ==
- International Convention for the Protection of Animals (ICAP)
- Universal Declaration on Animal Welfare (UDAW)
- Convention on Animal Protection for Public Health, Animal Well-Being, and the Environment (CAP)
