= Blind (Australian TV series) =

- Genre: Dramedy
- Created by: James Cripps
- Written by: James Cripps
- Directed by: Andre Muller
- Starring: Ryan Light; Crystal Moran; Kurt Winter; Ellie Gall; Matt Castley
- Country of origin: Australia
- Original language: English
- No. of seasons: 1
- No. of episodes: 7

Production
- Producer: Jessica Giacco
- Cinematography: Sidat de Silva

Original release
- Network: OzFlix; Twisted Mirror TV; Seeka TV
- Release: 31 March 2019

Blind is a seven-part Australian web television dramedy series, created and written by James Cripps and directed by Andre Muller. Set in one room over the course of a summer, the series follows five young friends as they try to navigate the world and each other.

== Synopsis ==
Blind is a youth-based comedy-drama web series where the forces of love, music, drugs, friendship, and spirituality collide in the heightened environment of the Sweaty Bender Room, a place where the party never stops.

Through the minefield of a summer's worth of partying, idealistic space cadet Ali pursues his dream girl, the hypnotic and insightful Chelsea. For Ali, friendship is eternal, music is emotion, drugs are life-enhancers, and love is pure and poetic. However, he soon finds out how finite and fickle these conceptions are. Between his cynical best friend Jake, the off-his-lips party-animal Yogi, and the heart-on-her-sleeve wild child Stacey, Ali tries to make sense of life, believing the answer is Chelsea. But like the high they are all so wrapped up in, these naïve ideas will eventually come crashing down.

== Production ==
Originally titled Kick On Kids, the series was first conceptualised while Cripps and Muller were students at Macquarie University in late 2012. The production team began casting in late 2014, casting mostly unknown local actors and actresses in the lead roles, as well as Puberty Blues actress, Ellie Gall. To fund the project, the team ran a fundraising campaign through the crowdfunding site, Indiegogo, with a target of $15,000.

In addition to telling youth-oriented stories that they felt had been neglected by Australia's free-to-air television networks, Cripps and Muller said they wanted to highlight emerging young artists, booking local musicians and designers to score the series and dress the actors early in the pre-production phase.

== Distribution ==
Retitled as Blind, the series was announced as the first OzFlix Original for the Australian-only content streaming service. The series was later picked up Twisted Mirror TV in the United Kingdom and Ireland, and SeekaTV in North America.

== Cast ==
- Ryan Light as Ali Wylde
- Crystal Moran as Chelsea
- Kurt Winter as Jake
- Ellie Gall as Stacey
- Matt Castley as Yogi

== Awards ==
Award	Year	Category	Recipients	Result	Ref.
New York City Web Fest	2018	Best International Web Series	James Cripps and Jessica Giacco	Nominated	
New York City Web Fest	2018	Best Director	Andre Muller	Nominated	
Seoul Webfest	2018	Best Actress	Crystal Moran	Won	
Seoul Webfest	2018	Best Cinematography	Sidat de Silva	Won	
Seoul Webfest	2018	Best Webseries of All Genres	James Cripps and Jessica Giacco	Nominated	
Seoul Webfest	2018	Best Drama	James Cripps and Jessica Giacco	Nominated	
Seoul Webfest	2018	Best Actor	Kurt Winter	Nominated	
Seoul Webfest	2018	Best Supporting Actor	Matt Castley	Nominated	
Seoul Webfest	2018	Best Supporting Actress	Ellie Gall	Nominated	
Rio Webfest	2018	Best Writing (Drama)	James Cripps	Nominated	
Rio Webfest	2018	Best Actor (Drama)	Ryan Light	Nominated	
Rio Webfest	2018	Best Ensemble Cast (Drama)	Ryan Light, Crystal Moran, Kurt Winter, Ellie Gall, Matt Castley	Nominated	
New York Film Awards	2018	Best Web Series	Andre Muller and James Cripps	Won	
Tuscany Web Fest	2018	Best Soundtrack	Michael Yezerski and John Hresc	Won	

== See also ==
- List of Australian television series
