= Brian Kraft =

American entrepreneur and underground filmmaker

- Born: 1970 (age 55–56)
- Education: University of Santa Monica
- Occupations: filmmaker, Chief Academic Officer

Brian Kraft (born 1970) is an American entrepreneur and underground filmmaker primarily known for the films The Brandon Corey Story and the ten-hour documentary on the collapse of the United States, The Fall of America and the Western World – A Survival Guide. He is also an American educator known for his co-creation of the "mentor/apprentice approach" to learning. He is chief academic officer for RRFC, Inc.

== Career as an educator ==
As Chief Academic Officer of the Recording Connection, Radio Connection, Film Connection, CASA Schools, Kraft oversees the day-to-day operations of the Mentor/Apprentice approach to learning at all of the private school’s locations, nationwide. He has written or co-written the film, recording and radio curriculums that the school uses. The school is owned by RRFC, Inc., which Kraft has ownership in.

He is a public speaker and a vocal proponent of learning from professional mentors. A non-fiction book on the subject is due out in 2012. It is rumored that it will be published by Hay House.

Kraft attended The University of Santa Monica (USM) in Santa Monica, Ca. to study Transpersonal Psychology and is a career counselor and mentor to adults.

== Film career ==
In 2000, Kraft worked as a camera production assistant on the film Sally, starring Rachael Leigh Cook and Michael Weston.

Kraft wrote and directed The Brandon Corey Story in 2006 which is a feature-length pseudo-documentary detailing how and why an anti-war activist is kidnapped by minions working for former Vice President Dick Cheney, who in this film, turns out to be an Alien. Great Britain's David Icke, an advocate of the Reptilian conspiracy theory, plays himself in the film and assists the characters (played by actors) in uncovering Dick Cheney’s true identity. The filmmakers used stock footage of Cheney. Filmed in Los Angeles, London, Texas and Washington D.C., while the United States was preparing for the 2003 invasion of Iraq. In the film, Icke screams at police standing guard in front of the Palace of Westminster. It is reported that Icke was later arrested for the outburst. The film’s finale shows Dick Cheney shape shifting into a Reptilian Alien and feeding on a naked girl in a Satanic ritual.

Kraft has stated that while he is a friend of Icke and loves his mind, he does not believe that Dick Cheney is an Alien, although he was quoted as saying "that the man sure looks like one though". When asked if he thinks Reptilians have conquered Planet Earth, Kraft responded, "No, but the metaphor is brilliant. Let’s be honest, our leaders, their bosses and their sycophants have co-created one hell of a mess on our planet, and so I made the film to point out the difference between those of us with souls and those who appear to be soulless."

In 2008-09, Kraft directed and produced the ten-hour documentary The Fall of America and the Western World – A Survival Guide featuring feminist author Naomi Wolf, conservative journalist and conspiracy theorist Joseph Farah, free market economists Doug Casey and David McAlvany, conspiracy theorist David Icke, NYU professor and media studies author Mark Crispin Miller, libertarian author and film producer G. Edward Griffin, conservative author and economist Paul Craig Roberts, radio host and conspiracy theorist Alex Jones and radio host and columnist Doug McIntyre. 100% documentary, this film takes a serious look at how liberals, anarchists, radicals, conservatives and moderates all agree that America is on its way to economic implosion primarily through the wanton printing of money, fiscal irresponsibility, and government stupidity. The film was an Internet sensation, and is often cited as way to successfully market films to the masses without the need of mainstream distribution.

Kraft began production on another documentary, Rise Up and Be Free, The Prisoner’s Guide To Freedom. It features Guru Singh, G. Edward Griffin, Douglas Casey, Daniel Quinn, Douglas Rushkoff, and Ted Rall. As of July 2022, the project consists of a website.

== Television career ==
In 1999, Kraft worked as an art department production assistant for 9 episodes of The Sopranos.

In 2010, it was reported that Kraft was working with the co-creators of Project Greenlight on a reality show entitled The Mentor, which featured Kraft working with unsuccessful adults to become successful and soulful. "I’m personally not a fan of reality TV but I am obsessed with documentary film and documentary TV. This is more about that. The show is really very moving. They did a great job at following my ugly mug around, watching me work with people who really wanted to be better human beings. It’s amazing what a person can accomplish when they realize they are not their egos, when they realize they are co-creators. The show isn’t about being successful as much as it is about connecting with natural law, and through that, finding one’s true calling and grace. I’m grateful that they contacted me, they are a pleasure to work with. Their mission is to make TV better by making it more intelligent and I support that."

In November 2010, Kraft appeared in a segment on ABC News 20/20 Show that investigated the malicious grading practices of the Better Business Bureau.

Kraft appeared on the national radio show, The Alex Jones Radio Program for Genesis Communications twice.

In November 2011, Kraft appeared in Dr. Drew's Lifechangers wherein he granted a full scholarship to a troubled young documentary filmmaker from Detroit, Michigan.

In 2012 Kraft, working with Jimi Petulla launched a charity called "The Connectors" which gives away free apprenticeships to people without the means to fund their own education. As connectors, Kraft travels the globe with Petulla and gives away free apprenticeships in all careers like: fashion, culinary, photography, film, recording, broadcasting, design and business. Kraft and Petulla find willing mentors to train the recipient and pay for that apprenticeship. The idea is based on the Recording, Radio and Film Connection, which are the apprenticeship programs founded by Petulla and run by Kraft.

== Filmography ==
Film
Year	Title	Episodes	Role
1998	The Reality of Doing		
2000	Sally		Camera Production Assistant
2004 Concert Film	Human Planet starring Jane’s Addiction	Ozomatli	
2004 Concert Film	Human Planet starring Jane’s Addiction	Cypress Hill	
2004 Concert Film	Human Planet starring Jane’s Addiction	The Breeders	
2006	The Brandon Corey Story		
2009	The Fall of America and the Western World		Director, writer, Co-Producer
2013	The Prisoner's Guide To Freedom		Director, writer, Co-Producer

Television
Year	Title	Episodes	Role
1999	The Sopranos	46 Long	Art Department Production Assistant
1999	The Sopranos	Denial, Anger, Acceptance	Art Department Production Assistant
1999	The Sopranos	Meadownlands	Art Department Production Assistant
1999	The Sopranos	College	Art Department Production Assistant
1999	The Sopranos	Pax Soprana	Art Department Production Assistant
1999	The Sopranos	Down Neck	Art Department Production Assistant
1999	The Sopranos	The Legend of Tennessee Moltisanti	Art Department Production Assistant
1999	The Sopranos	Boca	Art Department Production Assistant
1999	The Sopranos	A Hit is a Hit	Art Department Production Assistant
