= Scholastic wrestling =

US high school wrestling

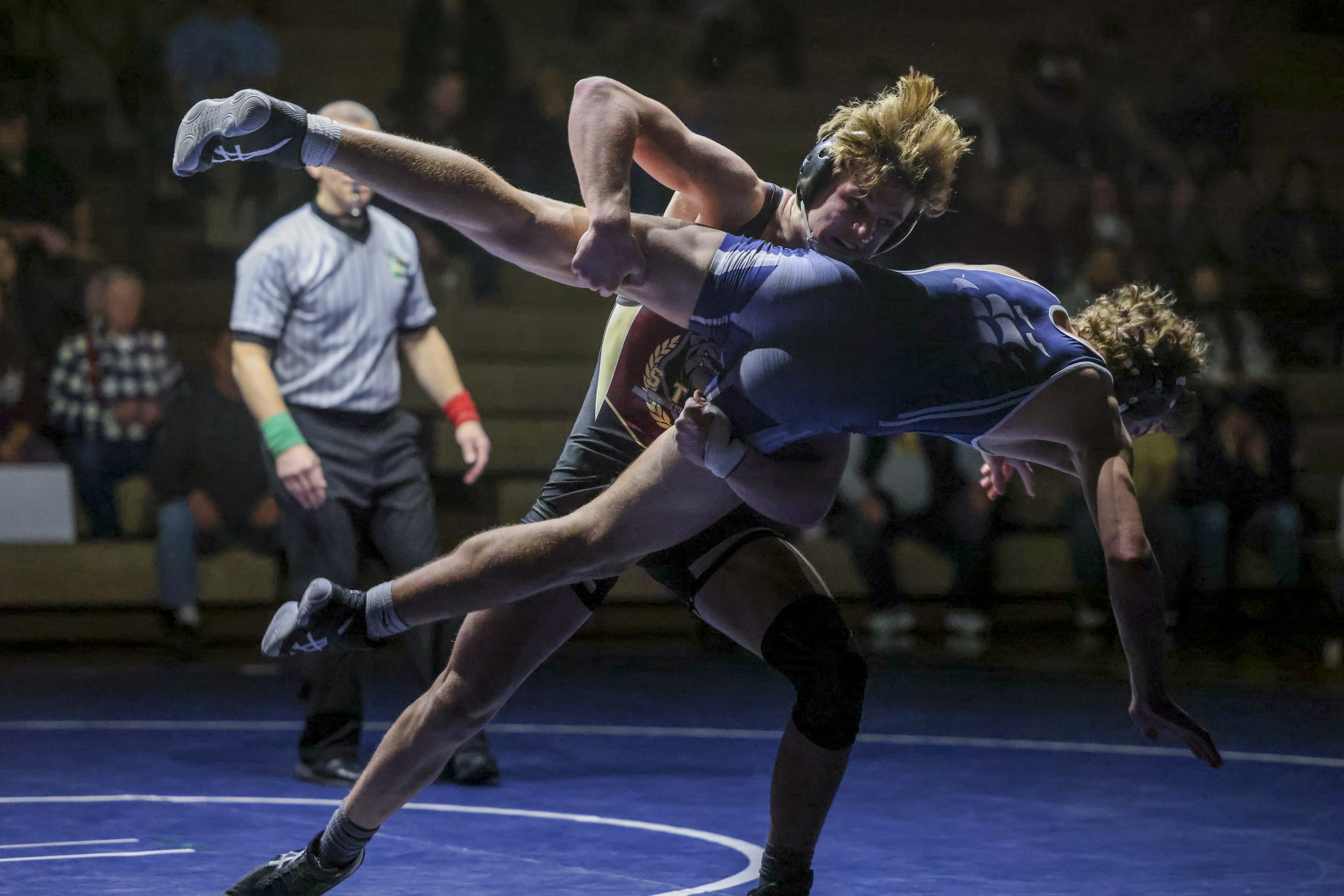
- A wrestler attempts to finish a double leg takedown in a high school wrestling match
- Focus: Pinning, Wrestling, Grappling
- Hardness: Full-contact
- Country of origin: United States
- Famous practitioners: Cael Sanderson, Dan Gable, Jordan Burroughs, Kyle Dake, Logan Stieber, Kyle Snyder, Zain Retherford, Jason Nolf, David Taylor, Leroy Kemp, Spencer Lee, Cary Kolat, Kenny Monday, J'den Cox, Jesse Delgado, John Smith, Pat Smith, Ben Peterson, Danny Hodge, Dave Schultz, Mark Schultz, Kurt Angle, and Brock Lesnar
- Parenthood: Wrestling
- Related arts: Greco-Roman Wrestling, Freestyle Wrestling
- Olympic sport: Only freestyle and Greco-Roman deviation styles

Scholastic wrestling, sometimes referred to as folkstyle wrestling and commonly known as simply wrestling, is a style of amateur wrestling at the high school and middle school levels in the United States. It has often been labeled the "toughest sport in the world" because of the physical conditioning, mental preparation, complexity, and intense nature of its one-on-one competition.

According to an athletics participation survey taken in 2006–07 by the National Federation of State High School Associations, 9,445 high schools sponsored boys' wrestling teams and 257,246 boys participated in the sport, making it the eighth-most available and sixth-most popular high school sport in the nation. Among high school girls, 5,408 girls participated on 1,227 high school girls wrestling teams nationally, as of 2006–07.

Scholastic wrestling competition at the high school level is in all 50 U.S. states and the national capital of Washington, D.C.

== History ==
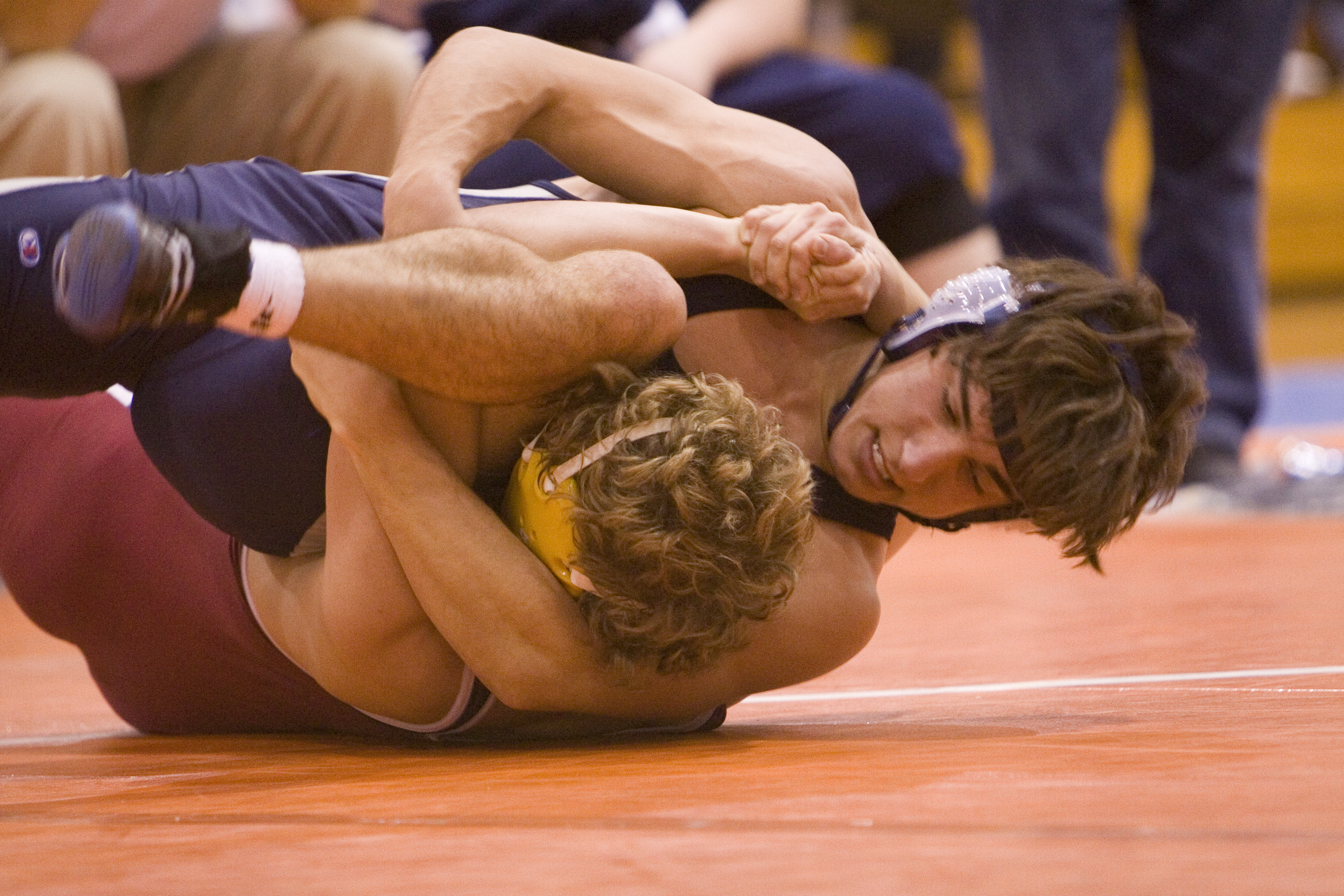
A scholastic wrestling match in November 2006

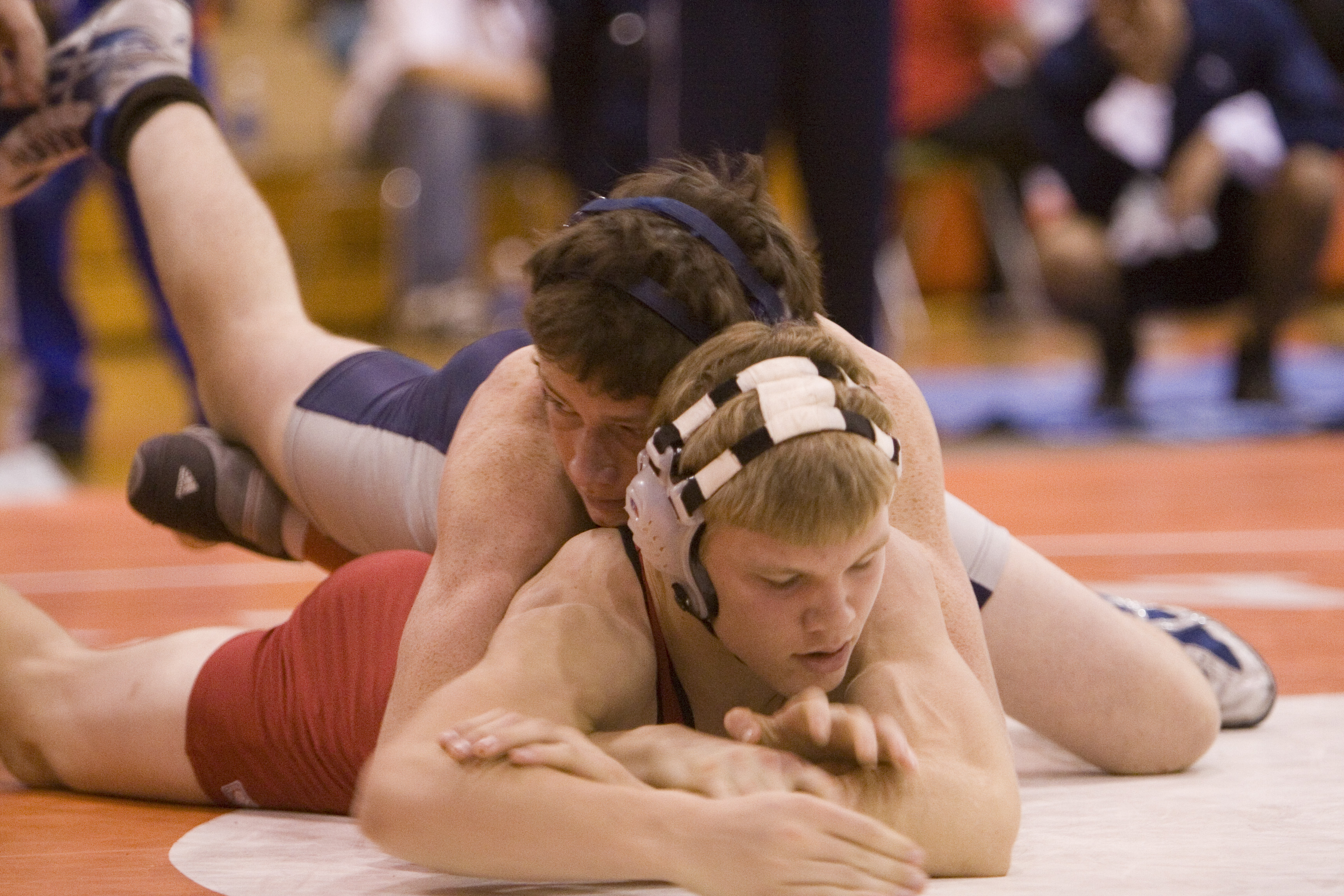
In scholastic wrestling, great emphasis is placed on one wrestler's control of the opponent on the mat, usually by controlling the opponent's legs or torso. When a wrestler maintains restraining power over an opponent, as seen here, he is said to be in a position of advantage.

The history of scholastic wrestling in the U.S. is closely related to the development of its college counterpart. In 1905, the Eastern Intercollegiate Wrestling Association held its first tournament, which soon sparked many more wrestling tournaments at both the collegiate and high school levels.

At the high school level during the 1930s and 1940s, wrestling programs and championships would grow rapidly, as state-based high school athletic bodies added and sanctioned the sport. In the mid-20th century, college and high school wrestling programs greatly expanded after the National Collegiate Athletic Association (NCAA) standardized collegiate wrestling rules, which were all or partly adopted on the high school level by state athletic associations.

The standardization of NCAA rules also inspired colleges, universities, and junior colleges to expand their dual meets and tournaments, including developing organized wrestling programs and expanding existing ones. As high school wrestling continued to grow in the 1950s and ensuing decades, various collegiate athletic conferences also increased the number and quality of their wrestling programs, with a growing number of high school wrestlers being recruited and entering collegiate-level competition.

Girls scholastic wrestling has a less definitive history. It began in the 1970s when girls sporadically began joining boys wrestling teams. In the 1990s, girls-only high school wrestling programs began being established. Notable early women scholastic wrestlers include Tricia Saunders, the first female National Wrestling Hall of Fame inductee. In 1993, the first official all-girls high school wrestling team was established at Brookline High School in Brookline, Massachusetts; the team of 15 girls became an official public high school team three years later in 1996. The first official U.S. Girls Wrestling Nationals was held the following year in 1997.

Since the early 20th century, state high school associations across the United States host annual wrestling championships for individuals and for teams. At one time, there could be no middle school wrestlers participating at the high school level, but as of 2016, middle school wrestlers now can also compete at the high school level if allowed through procedures set out by their respective state associations. As in all scholastic sports, after a middle schooler participates at a varsity level, they can no longer compete in a junior or middle school level in that sport.

== Weight classes ==
Scholastic wrestling is regulated by the National Federation of State High School Associations (NFHS). Each state high school association has adopted its wrestling rules, with each making some modifications. Every high school is expected to practice wrestling at two levels, varsity and junior varsity, although wrestling at the freshmen (ninth grade) level is becoming more widespread. The NFHS generally sets the standard for weight classes for high school-level dual meets, multiple duals, and tournaments. In most states, high school wrestlers can compete at 14 different weight classes, ranging from 106 lb (48 kg) to the heavyweight division of up to 285 lb (129 kg).

Other states have additional or modified weight classes, such as the 96 lb (44 kg) weight class in states such as New York, the 98 lb (44 kg) and 105 lb (48 kg) weight classes in states such as Montana, and the 180 lb (82 kg) weight class in states such as Texas.

Weight classes for junior varsity, freshman, and middle school teams may differ from state to state. Each state high school association that sanctions wrestling also has a defined weight control plan that prohibits excessive weight loss and dehydration during the season. The plan would prohibit dropping below seven percent body fat for males and 12 percent body fat for females in order to reach a lower weight class. These weight control plan includes provisions for weight assessment by the school's athletics medical staff, and certification of the lowest allowable weight class with the team's head coach and the person that performs the weight assessment. This is often done online through the website of the state high school association, or through the National Wrestling Coaches Association (NWCA).

After the date of certification, a growth allowance of two pounds in each weight class may be allowed in some states. Many tournaments offer an allowance of one or two pounds, allowing wrestlers to compete in a certain class if they are within the allowance of making the weight limit for that class. All of this is done in order to protect the wrestler's health.

NWCA official weight classes as of 2024-25 are: 106, 113, 120, 126, 132, 138, 144, 150, 157, 165, 175, 190, 215, and 285.

== Season structure ==
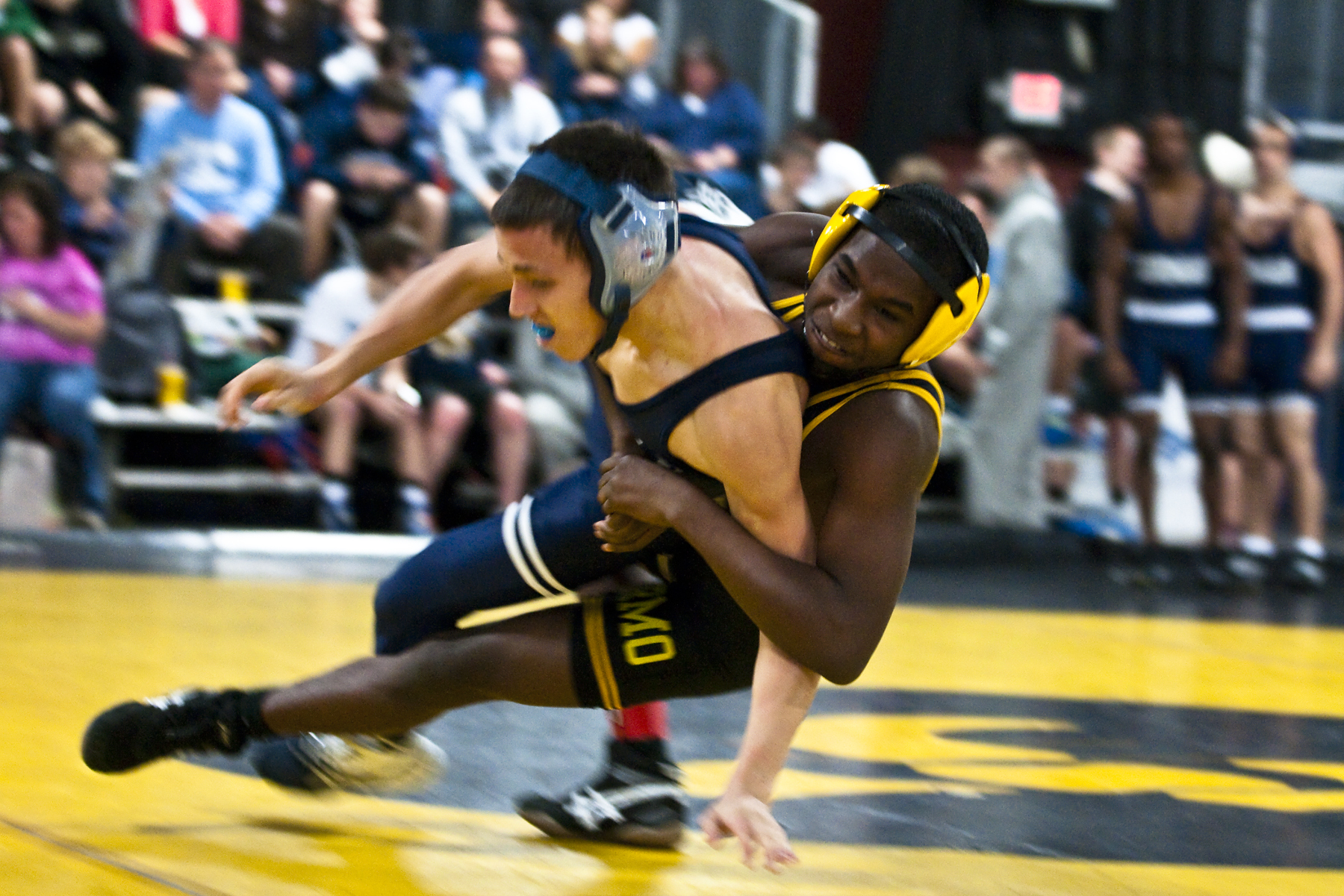
In this photo from the 2012 U.S. Military Duals tournament in Columbia, South Carolina, featuring wrestlers from Pennsylvania, South Carolina, Tennessee, and Virginia, the top wrestler is attempting to break his opponent down to the mat to both keep the bottom wrestler from scoring and to help in scoring points from the top position.

The high school wrestling season customarily runs from October or November to March. Regular season competition begins in late October or early November and continues until February. Post-season competition usually continues from February to March depending on whether individual wrestlers or teams qualify for regional, sectional, or state championships.

Wrestling teams from two different high schools normally compete in what is known as a "dual meet". It is possible for there also to be a "multiple dual", where more than two wrestling teams compete against each other at the same event on the same day. For example, one high school wrestling team may face another wrestling team for the first dual, and then a third wrestling team for the second dual. Also, those two wrestling teams may compete against each other in a dual meet as well. High schools often compete in regional, city-, or county-wide leagues.

=== Dual meets ===
Dual meets usually take place on evenings during the school week, or on Saturday mornings, afternoons, or evenings during the wrestling season and begin with weigh-ins, shoulder-to-shoulder, at a maximum of one hour before the meet begins. Wrestlers may wrestle up only one weight class above the weight class that they are placed in, with some exceptions. If a wrestler fails to make weight, he either has to forfeit or weigh-in at a higher class. If a wrestler is suspected by a referee or coach of having a communicable skin disease, the wrestler can either be disqualified or provide written documentation from a physician that the skin disease is not communicable. If a meet physician is on-site, his or her judgment would overrule such documentation.

Dual meets often feature one or two pound allowances, but in order to qualify for a league championship, wrestlers are required to weigh in without the benefit of a pound allowance at what is called "scratch weight" a certain number of times during the dual meet season.

After weigh-ins, the referee coordinates the random draw, which determines the sequence of weight classes for the dual meet. After the random draw, the referee will call the wrestlers from each team who have been designated as captains. One of the captains will call a disk toss. The disk will then fall to the floor and determine which team has the choice of position at the start of the second period, and which one of the team's members is to appear first at the scorer's table when called by the referee for each weight class. The wrestling captain who wins the disk toss may choose the even or odd weight classes, the weight classes, from lowest to highest, that are numbered evenly or oddly. The first weight class chosen in the random draw is odd. The rest of the weight classes are even and odd accordingly. If the 120lb weight class is chosen in the random draw, for example, then the 120lb, 132lb, 145lb, and subsequent weight classes would be odd, and the 126lb, 138lb, 152lb, and subsequent weight classes would be even. This order would work in the traditional sequence until the last even weight class at 113lb.

During a dual meet, both the junior varsity and varsity squads from the two schools compete against each other. The format of competition is as follows:

- The top junior varsity wrestler of each school compete against each other in an order determined by the random draw. The first weight class drawn starts the competition, with the following weight classes proceeding in order. For example, if the 152 lb weight class was drawn first, the matches would follow after that weight class up to the 285 lb match. The matches would then revert to 106 lb and proceed to 145 lb. The dual meet would then commence with each school's top junior varsity wrestler in the first weight class drawn. After that, the top junior varsity wrestlers then compete in the succeeding weight classes. If more than one junior varsity wrestler is at a certain weight class for each school, the coaches will sometimes hold an "exhibition match", which does not count towards the junior varsity team score but allows the wrestlers to gain more competitive experience. Sometimes matches are not scored for a winning team, allowing wrestlers to focus on skills and technique rather than winning. If one school has two junior varsity wrestlers at the same weight and the other school only has one, the lone wrestler may sometimes be permitted to wrestle both the other's wrestlers. It is also common for junior varsity wrestlers to compete against wrestlers one or two weight classes above or below them.
- After a break, the varsity matches commence in the same fashion as the junior varsity matches. However, there are no exhibition matches at the varsity level. Freshmen wrestling matches could also begin during the same time, or before the junior varsity matches.

=== Tournaments ===
High schools in the United States often compete in a tournament, which allows many schools to establish their rankings, not only for individual wrestlers and high school teams as a whole. Tournaments are often sponsored by a high school or a state high school association and are held on Friday, Saturday, Sunday, or over any two days during the weekend. Admission is often charged to cover costs and make a small profit for the host. A tournament committee usually administers the event and after individual and team entries have been verified, the officials then determine the order of the matches, called a drawing, by certain brackets usually including eight and up to 16 individual wrestlers.

The tournament officials when doing this drawing take into account each wrestler's win–loss record, previous tournament placements, and other factors that indicate the wrestler's ability. With that in mind, wrestlers who are noticed as having the most superior records are bracketed so that two top-ranked superior wrestlers in each weight class do not compete against each other in an early round. This is called "seeding". A tournament begins with weigh-ins, shoulder-to-shoulder, starting two hours or less before competition begins. An allowance of one pound is granted for each subsequent day of the tournament, up to a maximum of two pounds.

With the drawing and weigh-ins completed, wrestlers then compete in two brackets in each of the 14 weight classes. Often, a tournament host will field a "house team" composed of junior varsity wrestlers from competing schools when there are open slots in the brackets. Tournaments are usually either varsity or junior varsity competitions. If there are not enough wrestlers to fill up the bracket in a weight class in the first round, a bye will be awarded to a wrestler who does not have to compete against another wrestler in his pairing. After taking account the number of byes, the first round in each weight class then begins. Unlike most sports, where byes are awarded to the highest seeded teams or individuals, byes on a wrestling bracket are drawn randomly.

Most high school wrestling tournaments are in double elimination format. The last two wrestlers in the upper championship bracket wrestle for first place in the finals, with the loser winning second place. In other words, a wrestler cannot place higher than third if he is knocked down to the lower consolation bracket by losing in the championship semifinals. This is largely the result of time constraints: one-day tournaments often last into the evening. If the winner of the consolation bracket were allowed to challenge the winner of the championship bracket in the championship, the tournament could continue well past midnight before finishing.

Depending on how many places are scored, the consolation rounds would then commence, beginning among all of the wrestlers who lost to the winners of a certain round. For example, in tournaments scoring eight places, consolation rounds would begin with all of the wrestlers who lost to the winners of the first round matches. After the championship semifinals, the losers in the semifinals would be cross-bracketed into the consolation semifinals.

The winner of the consolation finals would then win third place, with the loser winning fourth place. In tournaments where six places are awarded, the losers of the consolation semifinals would wrestle for fifth place, with the loser winning sixth place. If eight places are awarded, the losers of the consolation quarterfinals would wrestle for seventh place, with the loser winning eighth place, and so on. After the championships finals, the awards ceremony usually takes place with plaques, medals, trophies, or other awards given to the individual and team winners with the highest placements. Precise rules for tournaments may vary from one event to the next.

For tournaments too large to properly accommodate all wrestlers, some host schools will implement a "carry-over" bracket system in order to finish a tournament within the standard time restrictions of a few days. In said tournament, a wrestler will advance into the consolation bracket only if the winning opponent successfully advances into the finals. In the first few rounds of the tournament, a single-elimination-type method is implemented. For example, if a wrestler goes to a 64-person tournament, he or she must win at least one match before losing. Upon the loss, the winning opponent will advance until he or she reaches the finals.

Only those wrestlers who advance to the round before the quarter-finals and those who have lost to the wrestlers of the quarter-finals may have a chance at placing in the tournament. If our said wrestler wins the first match and loses the second match. The second opponent must advance an additional three rounds before our wrestler will be guaranteed another match and opportunity to place in this tournament. The carry-over system allows for more matches and a better siphoning process for large-scale tournaments by allowing only the best wrestlers to advance and giving the best of the losing opponents a chance to place in the tournament as well. However, many complain about the carry-over system, as it doesn't allow for those unseeded a fair opportunity in the tournament.

Each state or geographic area features two or three elite tournaments every year. These events are by invitation only and are called "Invitationals". Tournament sponsors, which are usually high schools, colleges, or universities, invite the best varsity wrestlers from their area to compete against each other. Many elite tournaments last two or even three days. For this reason, elite tournaments are often scheduled during the school's winter break. One of the most elite and longest-running high school wrestling invitational in the nation is hosted by Eagle Grove High School in Eagle Grove, Iowa.

Between one season and the next, postseason tournaments and preseason tournaments are often held in scholastic wrestling and also in freestyle and Greco-Roman. The most active wrestlers often take part in those to sharpen their skills and techniques. Also, clinics and camps are often held for both wrestlers and their coaches to help refresh old techniques and gain new strategies.

== Layout of the mat ==
The match takes place on a thick rubber mat that is shock-absorbing to ensure safety. A large outer circle at least 28 feet in diameter that designates the wrestling area is marked on the mat. The circumference line of that circle is called the boundary line. The wrestling area is surrounded by a safety mat area (or protection area) that is at least five feet in width. The mat area is designated by the use of contrasting colors or a 2-inch-wide (51 mm) line, which is in bounds as of the 2023-2024 scholastic season.

Wrestlers are within bounds when a minimum of two supporting points, which includes the weight-bearing points of the body, such as the feet, hands, knees, or buttocks of one or both wrestlers are inside this boundary line.

The mat can be no thicker than four inches nor thinner than a mat which has the shock-absorbing qualities of at least 1-inch (2.5 cm) PVC vinyl-covered foam. Inside the outer circle is usually an inner circle about 10 feet (3m) in diameter, designated by the use of contrasting colors or a 2-inch-wide (51 mm) line.

Wrestlers are encouraged to stay within this inner circle or else they risk being penalized for "stalling," which is deliberately attempting to exhaust the match's clock without meaningful wrestling acts or maneuvers. Each wrestler begins action at a starting line inside the inner circle that is three feet long. Two one-inch lines close the ends of the starting lines and are marked red for the wrestler from the visiting team and green for the wrestler from the home team.

The two starting lines are 12 inches (30 cm) from outside to outside and form a rectangle in the middle of the wrestling area. This rectangle designates the starting positions for the three periods. All mats that are in sections are secured together. Additional padding may be added under the mat to protect the wrestlers. For younger age groups, one mat may be divided into halves or quarters so that multiple matches may be staged on a single mat.

== Equipment ==
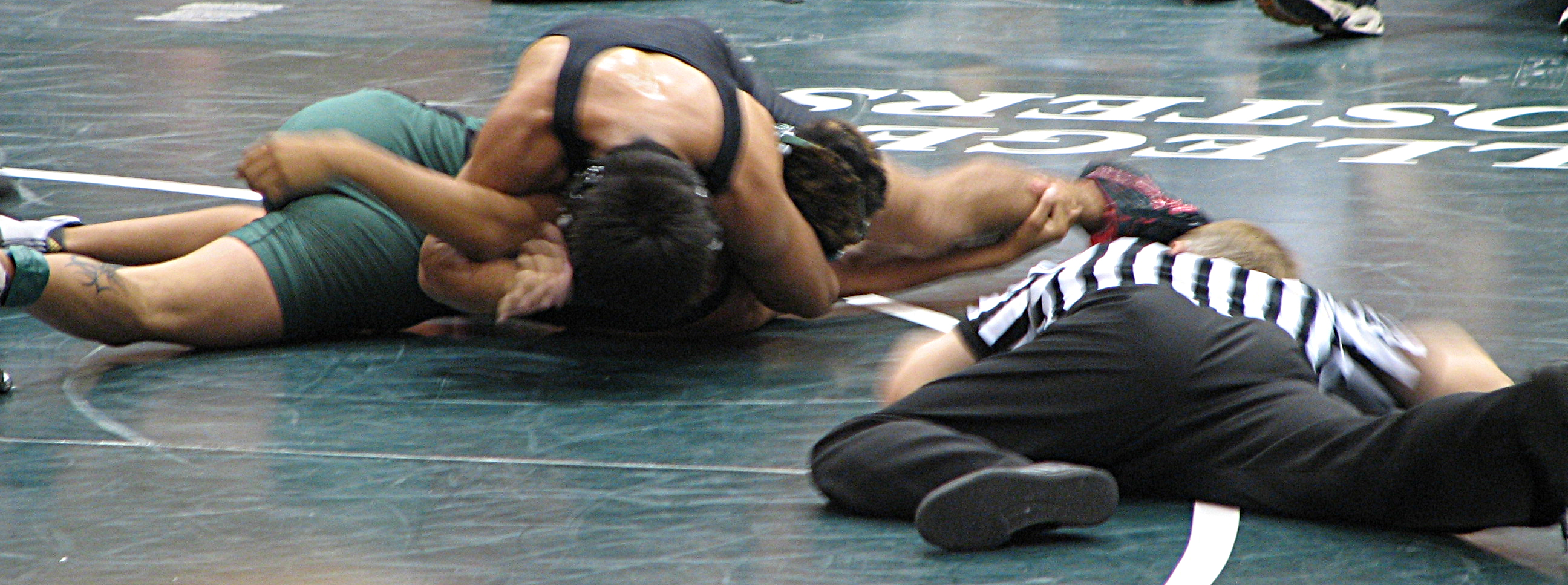
Securing the fall, or pinning, is the supreme goal in wrestling, since it scores the most team points in competitions; this near fall situation resulted in a fall several seconds later.

- A singlet is a one-piece wrestling garment made of spandex, nylon or lycra. It should provide a tight and comfortable fit for the wrestler, and prevents an opponent from using anything on the wrestler as leverage. The singlets are usually light or dark depending on whether the wrestlers are competing at home or abroad, and they are usually designed according to the school's or club's team colors. Wrestlers also have the option of wearing leggings with their singlets.
- A special pair of shoes is worn by a wrestler to increase his mobility and flexibility. Wrestling shoes are light and flexible in order to provide maximum comfort and movement. Usually made with rubber soles, they help give the wrestler's feet a better grip on the mat.
- Headgear, equipment worn around the ears to protect the wrestler, is mandatory in scholastic wrestling. Headgear is worn to decrease the participant's own risk for injury, as there is the potential to develop cauliflower ear.
- In addition, special equipment, such as face masks, braces, mouthguards, hair coverings, knee pads, or elbow pads may be worn by either wrestler. Anything worn that prevents normal movement or execution of holds is prohibited.

== The match ==
A match is a competition between two individual wrestlers, usually of the same weight class. The match consists of three periods totaling 4.5 minutes at the middle school level, 6 minutes at the high school level. with an overtime round if necessary if the score is tied at the end of regulation. High school matches are one minute shorter than college and university matches - not having collegiate wrestling's three-minute first period. Additionally, college wrestling uses the concept of "time advantage" or "riding time", while high school wrestling does not. Junior varsity and freshmen matches may be shorter than varsity matches in some states. Any differences in the length of time are explained by the fact that junior varsity and freshmen wrestlers are presumed to be younger, less skilled, and possibly in poorer shape than varsity wrestlers, though this may not always be the case. Period lengths vary for age groups below high school and are different from state to state.

The main official at the wrestling match is the referee, who is responsible for starting and stopping the match; observing all holds; signaling points; calling penalties such as illegal holds, unnecessary roughness, fleeing the mat, or flagrant misconduct; and finally observing a full view of and determining the fall. There can also be one assistant referee, which is common at tournaments, who helps the referee with making any difficult decisions and in preventing error. Also, scorers record the points of the two individual wrestlers. A match or meet timekeeper may be present to note the match time, timeouts, and work with the scorers.

=== Period format ===
==== Pre-match ====
Each wrestler is called by the referee, reports to the scorer's table, steps onto the mat, and may put on a green (for the home team) or red (for the visiting team) anklet about two inches wide which the referee will use to indicate scoring. The referee then prepares the wrestlers to begin the first period.

==== First period ====
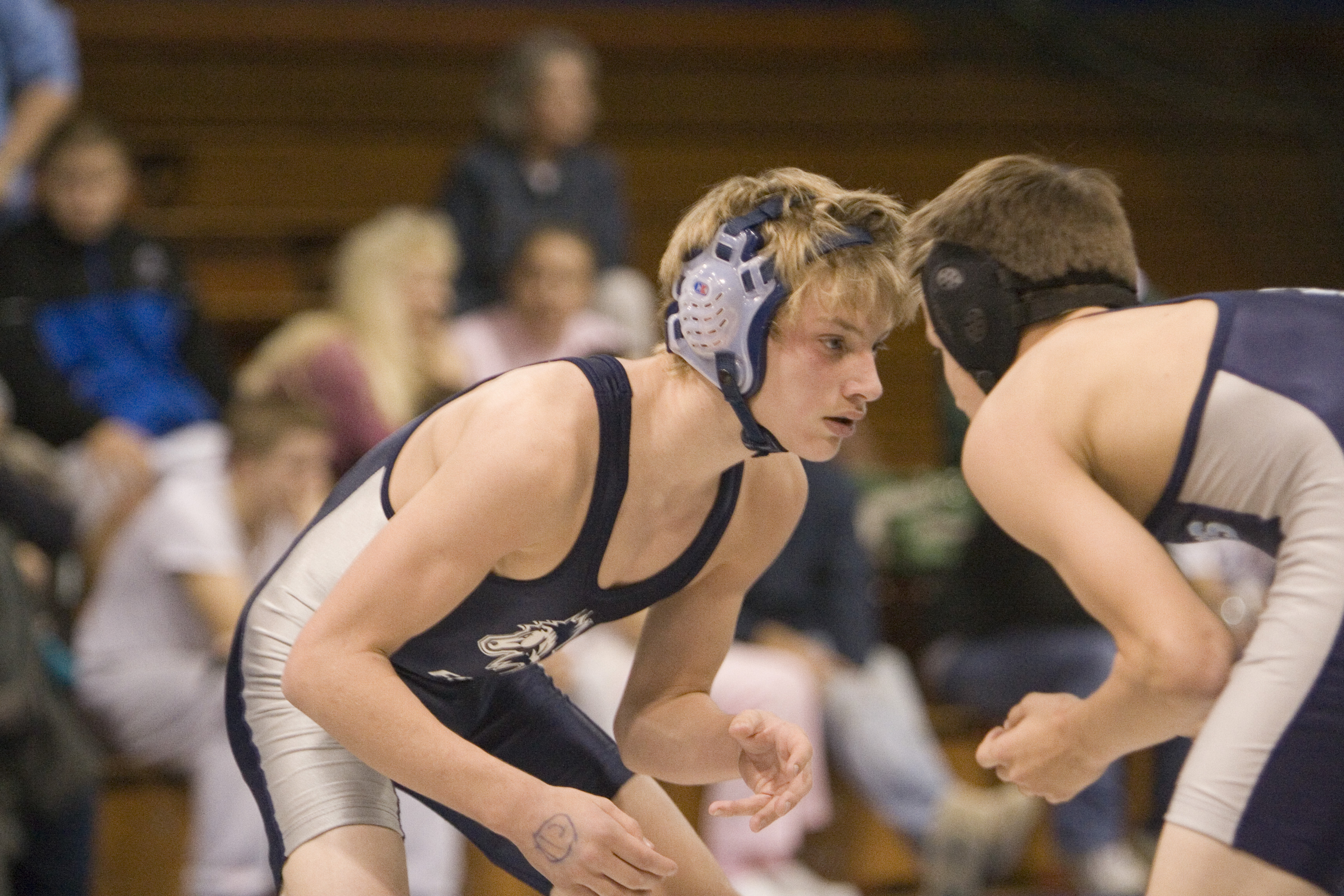
At the start of the first period, the two wrestlers are in the neutral or standing position, as shown.

The referee prepares both wrestlers for the first period by making sure each wrestler is correctly in the "neutral position". The neutral position has the two wrestlers standing opposite each other on their feet.

Each wrestler starts with his lead foot on the green or red area of the starting lines, and his other foot even with or behind the lead foot. Both wrestlers then usually slightly crouch with their arms in front of them at or above waist level. In this position, neither wrestler is in control. When the referee is certain that both wrestlers are correctly in the neutral position, he blows the whistle to begin the first period (as well as whenever wrestling is resumed, such as at the beginning of the second and third periods, when contestants resume wrestling after going out of bounds, etc.). The match commences with each wrestler attempting to take down his opponent. There are various ways to accomplish this, such as taking a shot or completing a throw. The first period in high school varsity wrestling matches is two minutes long.

==== Second period ====
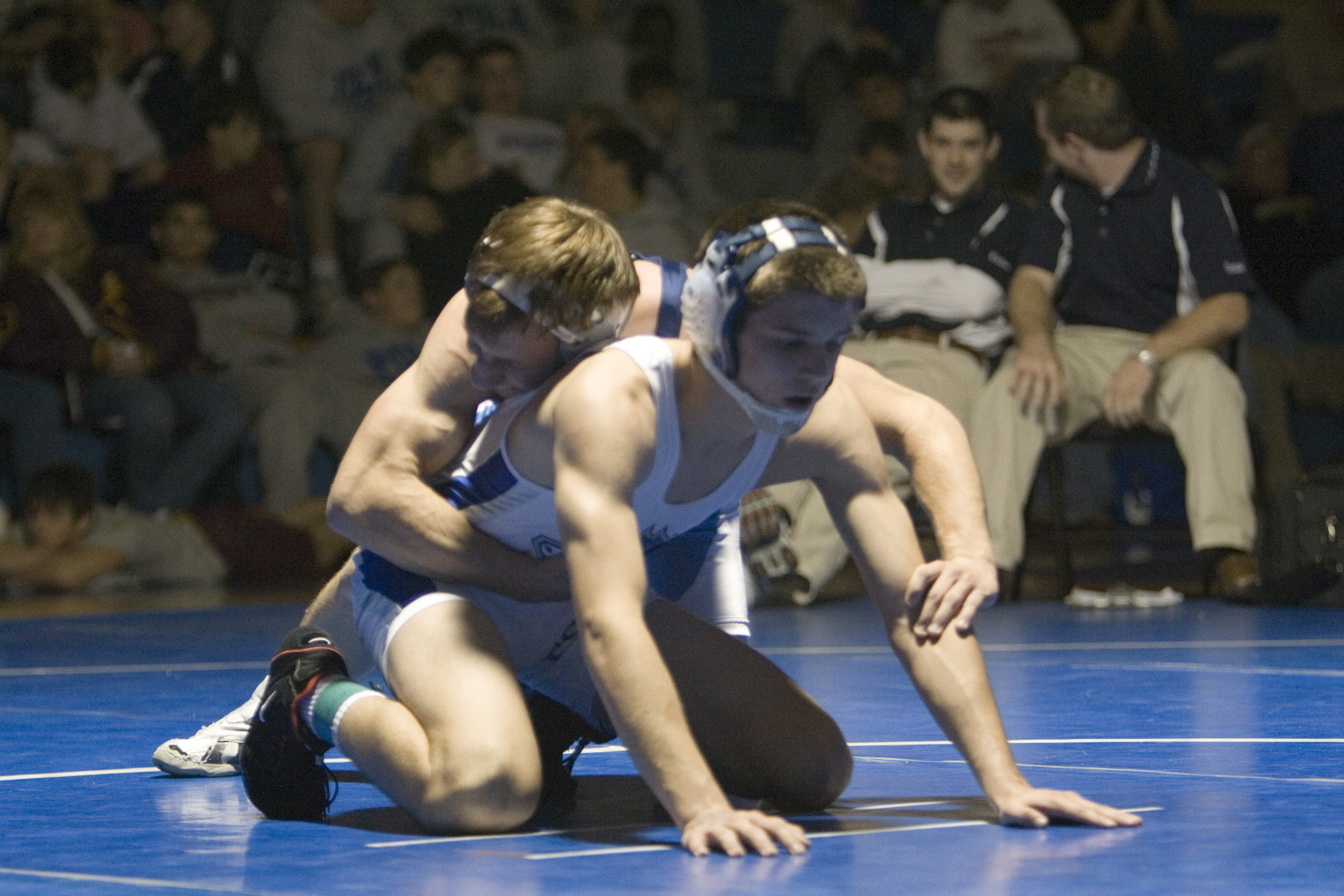
At the start of the second and third periods, both wrestlers start in the referee's position, with one wrestler on the bottom with hands spread out and feet held together, and one wrestler on the top with his hand around the opponent's waist and the other on the opponent's elbow.

If the match is not ended by a fall, technical fall, default, or disqualification, the referee then prepares both wrestlers to begin the second period. After the first period ends, one wrestler will have the choice of starting position in the second period.

In dual meets, this is determined by the colored disk toss that took place before the meet began. In tournaments, the referee will toss a colored disk, with a green-colored side and a red-colored side, and the winner of that disk toss will have the choice of position. The wrestler could choose between the neutral position, or to begin in what is called the "referee's position" on the mat. The referee's position has both wrestlers beginning action at the center of the mat with one wrestler in the defensive starting position on the bottom with his hands spread apart in front of the forward starting line and his knees spread apart behind the rear starting line with his legs held together. The other wrestler on the top in the offensive starting position then kneels beside him with one arm wrapped around the bottom wrestler's waist with the palm of his hand against the opponent's navel and the other hand on or over the back of the opponent's near elbow for control.

The wrestler on the top must place his hand on the opponent's navel first, and then the elbow. This rule was recently instated in order to prevent the top wrestler's advantageous "slow arm" technique, where he/she can take advantage from placing his/her on the opponent's navel slowly. The wrestler starting in the offensive position is in control of his opponent, and thus does not need to gain control to score near-fall points or a pin. The wrestler could also choose the defensive (bottom) position, where he would have the opportunity to score points for a reversal or an escape and a subsequent takedown, as riding time is not calculated in high school wrestling. The wrestler could also defer his choice to the beginning of the third period.

More recently, another starting position choice has been allowed, known as the "optional offensive starting position" or "optional start". After the wrestler with the choice, known as the offensive wrestler, indicates his intention to the referee, the referee lets the defensive wrestler adjust and begin in the defensive starting position. Next, the offensive wrestler goes to either side of the defensive wrestler or behind him, with all his weight supported by both his feet or by one or both knees. The offensive wrestler would then place both his hands on the opponent's back between the neck and the waist. When the referee starts the match by blowing the whistle, the defensive wrestler then has the opportunity to get back to his feet in a neutral position.

Any of the starting positions may be used to resume action during a period when the wrestlers go off the mat, depending on the referee's judgment as to whether any or which wrestler had the advantage. The use of the optional starting position was greatly reduced by a 2007-08 rule change, which allows the offensive wrestler to choose to start from a neutral position, yielding one point for an escape to the defensive wrestler. The offensive wrestler must signal this intention to the referee before he comes set.

The second period is two minutes long.

==== Third period ====
If the match is not ended by a fall, technical fall, default, or disqualification, the referee then prepares both wrestlers to begin the third period. The wrestler who did not choose the starting position for the second period now chooses the starting position. The third period is also two minutes long.

===== Sudden victory period =====
If the third period ends in a tie, a one-minute sudden victory period occurs. Both wrestlers start in the neutral position. The first wrestler to score a point wins.

===== Tiebreaker periods =====
If no points are scored in the sudden victory period, two 30-second tiebreaker periods occur. Both wrestlers start in the referee's position. The wrestler who won a colored disk toss made by the referee has the choice of either top or bottom position, and he may NOT defer the choice to his opponent. After the wrestler makes the choice, the two contestants then wrestle. Either of the two wrestlers must try to score as many points as he can. Once one 30-second period is over, the wrestler who did not have the choice in the previous period may choose to start the new period from the top or bottom. Whoever scores the most points (or is awarded a fall, default, or disqualification) wins the match.

===== Ultimate tiebreaker period =====
If no points were scored or the score is still tied after the two 30-second tiebreaker periods, a final ultimate tiebreaker period is used. The ultimate tiebreaker period lasts for 30 seconds. Both wrestlers also start in the referee's position. The wrestler who scored the first points in regulation (except in the case of double-stalling or simultaneous penalties) has the choice of top or bottom position, or he may defer the choice to the opponent.

If no points were scored in the regulation match, the winner of a colored disk toss will have the choice of position. After the wrestler makes his choice, the two contestants then wrestle. The person in the bottom position must then escape or reverse his opponent to get the win. If the wrestler in the offensive (top) position rides the defensive (bottom) wrestler (that is, keeps the defensive wrestler under control in the position of advantage) for the entire 30 seconds, he wins the match and is awarded one point. Wrestlers may still be awarded points for near falls, and a fall terminates the bout.

=== Post-match ===
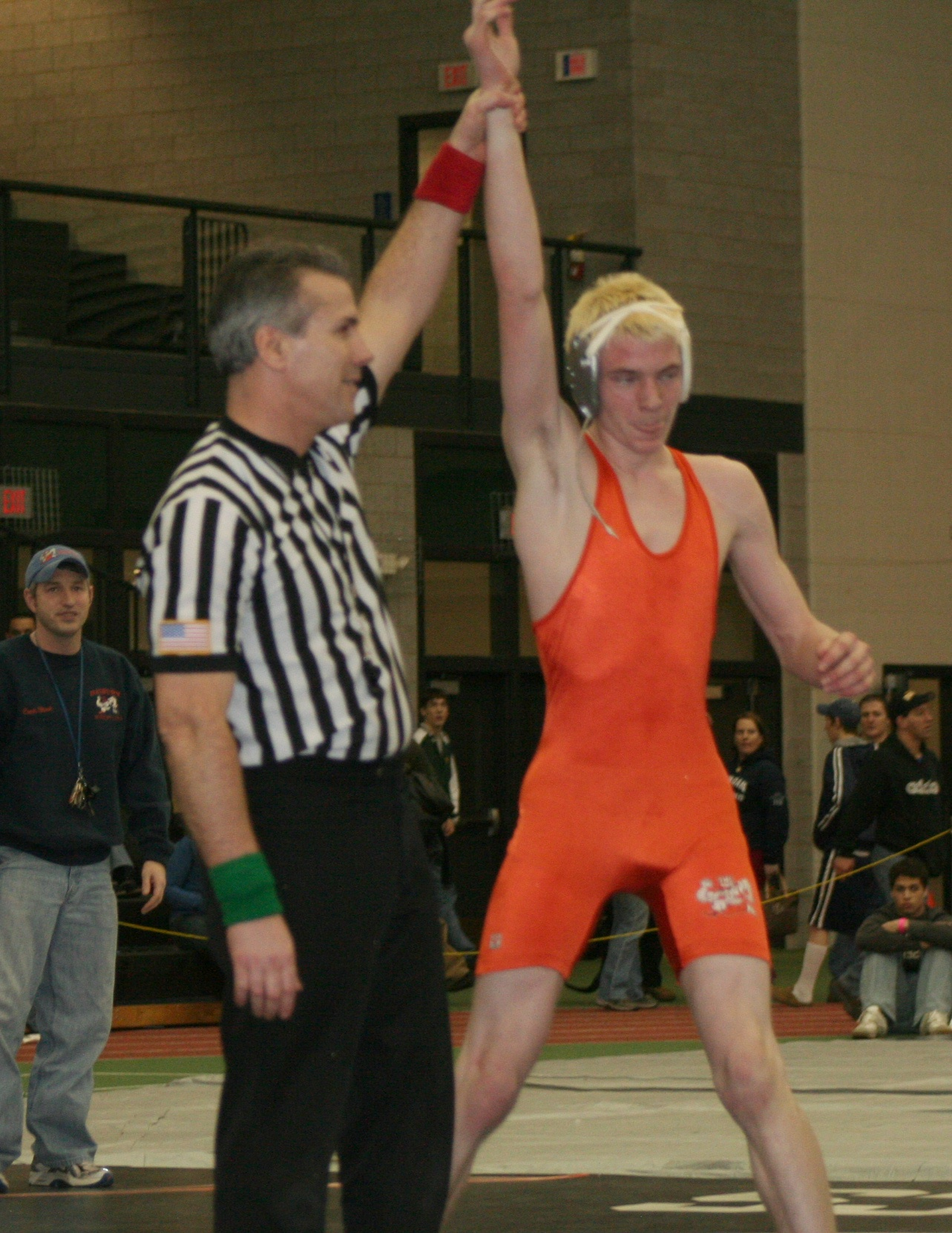
Following a wrestling match, the referee declares the winner of the match by raising the hand of the wrestler who won.

After the match is completed, regardless of the victory condition, the wrestlers will return to the center of the mat (on the 10-foot inner circle) while the referee checks with the scorer's table. Upon the referee's return to the mat, the two wrestlers shake hands, and the referee declares the winner by raising the winner's hand. While not stipulated by the rules, it is customary for both contestants to then shake the hand of the opposing team's coach(es). Both contestants then return to their team benches from the mat.

=== Match scoring ===
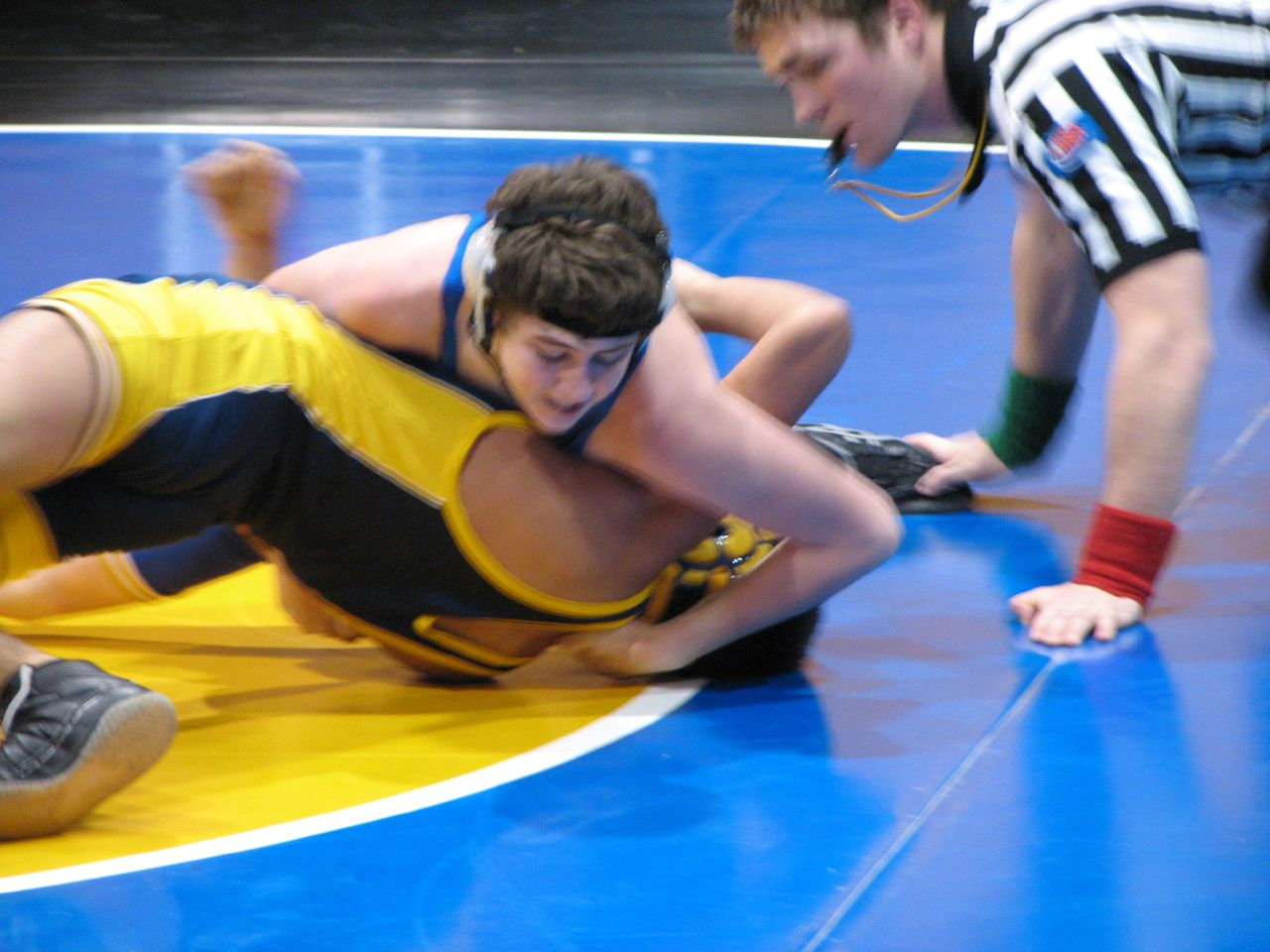
Near fall points can be scored when the offensive wrestler holds their opponent with one shoulder on the mat and one shoulder at an angle of 45 degrees or less toward the mat, for two or more seconds, as shown.

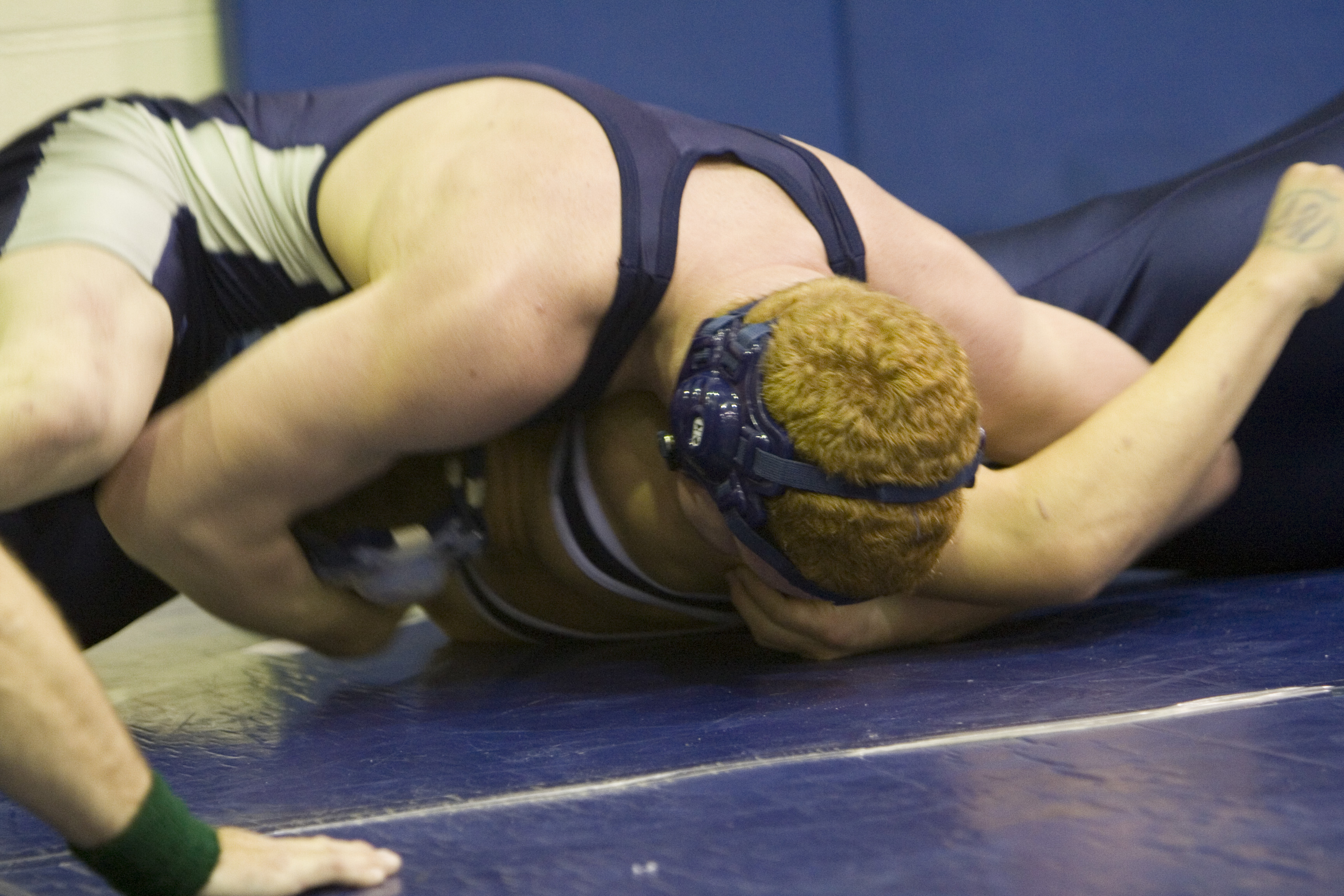
A near fall situation can also occur if both shoulders are within four inches of touching the mat, as shown.

In scholastic wrestling, points are awarded mostly on the basis of control. Control occurs when a wrestler has gained restraining power over an opponent, usually, by controlling the opponent's legs and torso. When a wrestler gains control and maintains restraining power over an opponent, he is said to be in the "position of advantage". Scoring can be accomplished in the following ways:

- Takedown (3 points): A wrestler is awarded three points for a takedown when, from the neutral position, he gains control by taking the other wrestler down to the mat in bounds and beyond reaction time, and the supporting point(s) of either wrestler are in bounds. This is most often accomplished by attacking the legs of the opponent, although various throws can also be used to bring a wrestler down to the mat.
- Escape (1 point): A defensive wrestler who is being controlled on the bottom is awarded one point for an escape when the defensive wrestler gains a neutral position and the offensive wrestler loses control of the opponent while the supporting point(s) of either wrestler remain in bounds.
- Reversal (2 points): A defensive wrestler who is being controlled on the bottom is awarded two points for a reversal when he comes from the bottom/defensive position and gains control of the opponent either on the mat or in a rear standing position. Reversal points are awarded on the edge of the wrestling area if either wrestler's supporting point(s) or the feet of the scoring wrestler remain in bounds.
- Near Fall: This is similar to the points for "exposure" or the "danger position" awarded in the international styles of wrestling, but the emphasis for near falls is on control, not risk. Near fall criteria are met when: (1) the offensive wrestler holds the defensive wrestler in a high bridge or on both elbows; (2) the offensive wrestler holds any part of both his opponent's shoulders or scapulae (shoulder blades) within four inches of the mat; or (3) the offensive wrestler controls the defensive wrestler in such a way that one of the bottom wrestler's shoulders or scapulae, or the head, is touching the mat, and the other shoulder or scapula is held at an angle of 45 degrees or less to the mat. The referee counts the seconds off. Near fall points are also known as "back points." Much of the criteria for the near fall was used in a former scoring opportunity known as predicament in scholastic wrestling. When near fall points are given after the opponent is injured, signals an injury, or bleeds excessively, it is a consequence of what is sometimes referred to as the "scream rule".

(2 points) - Two points are given when near fall criteria are met for two to four seconds. Two points can also be granted in cases where a pinning combination is executed legally and a near fall is imminent, but the defensive wrestler is injured, signals an injury, or bleeds excessively before the near fall criterion is met.

(3 points) - Three points are given when near fall criteria are met for five seconds or more. After five seconds, the referee awards three points and stops counting. When a near fall criterion is met that is between two and four seconds, and the defensive wrestler is injured, indicates an injury, or bleeds excessively, three points are also awarded.

(4 points) - Four points are given when a criterion for a near fall is met for five seconds, and the defensive wrestler later is injured, indicates an injury, bleeds excessively.

- Penalty (1 or 2 points): One or two points can be awarded by the referee to the opponent for various penalty situations. "Unsportsmanlike conduct" by the wrestler includes swearing, teasing the opponent, etc. "Unnecessary roughness" involves physical acts during the match that exceed normal aggressiveness. "Flagrant misconduct" includes actions (physical or nonphysical) that intentionally attack the opponent, the opponent's team, or others in a severe way. Illegal holds are also penalized accordingly, and potentially dangerous holds are not penalized, but the match will be stopped by the referee. Also, "technical violations" such as stalling, interlocking hands, and other minor infractions are penalized. With some situations, such as stalling, a warning is given after the first occurrence, and if there is another occurrence the penalty point is given. In other situations, there is no warning and penalty points are automatically given. In general, after a certain number of occurrences where penalty points are given, the penalized wrestler is disqualified.

The National Federation of High School Wrestling publishes a comprehensive list of penalty points awarded in high school wrestling on their website and in the NFHS Wrestling Rules Book, which the organization publishes.

== Scoring ==
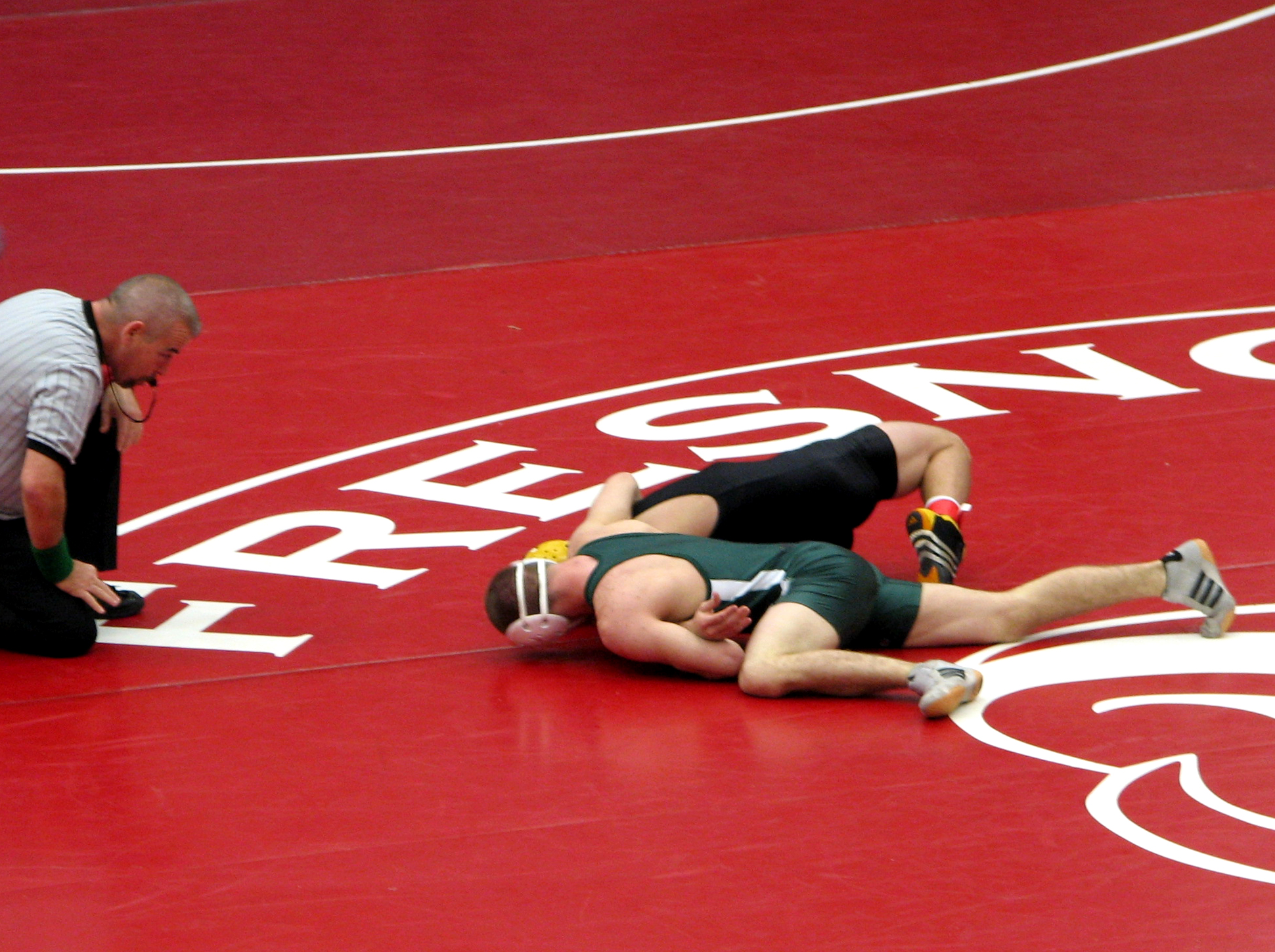
A fall, also known as a pin, occurs when any part of both shoulders or both scapulae (shoulder blades) of the defensive wrestler is held in continuous contact with the mat for a specified amount of time; in scholastic wrestling, it requires two seconds of continuous contact.

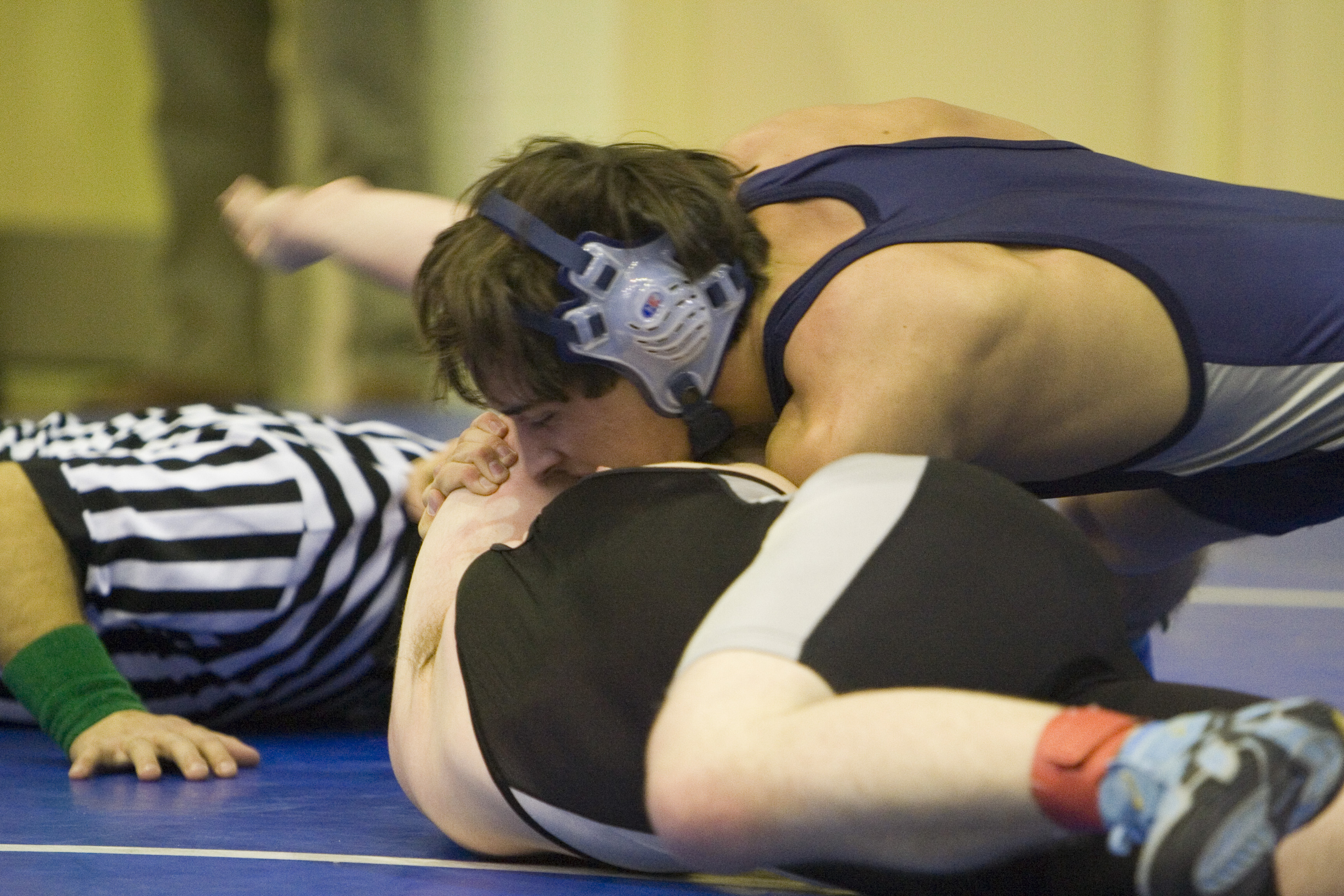
Falls (or pins) can be attained in many different technique combinations.

A match can be won in the following ways:

- Win by pin: The object of the entire wrestling match is to attain victory by what is known as the fall. A fall, also known as a pin, occurs when one wrestler holds any part of both of his opponent's shoulders or both of his opponent's shoulder blades in continuous contact with the mat for two seconds at the high school level and lower levels. The fall ends the match immediately, and the offensive wrestler who secured the fall is declared the winner. Falls (or pins) can be attained in many different ways. The most common way of securing the fall is through the various nelson holds, in particular, the half nelson. Other techniques used to secure falls are cradles, the headlock (head and arm), single or double armbars (bar arms), the leg Turk, the reverse body lock, the guillotine, the leg split (also known as the banana split or spread eagle), the spladle, the straight body scissors, and the double grapevine (also called the Saturday night ride).
- Win by technical fall: If a fall is not secured to end the match, a wrestler can win a match simply by points. If a wrestler can secure an advantage of 15 points over an opponent, then the wrestler can win the match by "technical fall". A technical fall is very likely when one wrestler has great control over the other wrestler and is able to score near fall points repeatedly. If the 15-point advantage is gained while the offensive wrestler has his opponent in a pinning situation, the match would continue to allow the offensive wrestler to secure the fall. If the offensive wrestler is unable to secure a fall, the match ends once a near fall situation is no longer seen by the referee or when the wrestlers return to the neutral position.
- Win by major decision: If no fall or technical fall occurs, a wrestler can also win simply by points. If the match concludes, and a wrestler has a margin of victory of eight or more points over an opponent, but under the 15 points needed for a technical fall, the win is known as a "major decision".
- Win by decision: If the match concludes, and a wrestler has a margin of victory of less than eight points over an opponent, or wins the first point in a sudden victory period in overtime without gaining a fall, default, or a win by an opponent's disqualification, the wrestler then wins by "decision".
- Win by default: If for any reason, a wrestler is unable to continue competing during the match (e.g., because of injury, illness), his opponent is awarded victory by "default". A wrestler can concede a win by default to his opponent by informing the referee himself of his inability to continue wrestling. The decision to concede the win by default can also be made by the wrestler's coach.
- Win by disqualification: If a wrestler is banned from participating further in a match by virtue of acquiring penalties or for flagrant misconduct, his opponent wins by "disqualification".
- Win by forfeit: A wrestler also may gain a victory by "forfeit" when the other wrestler fails to appear for the match. For a wrestler to win by forfeit however, he must appear on the mat in a wrestling uniform. The existence of the forfeit condition encourages teams to have at least one junior varsity and one varsity competitor at every weight class.

== Team scoring ==
=== Dual meet scoring ===
On the high school level in a "dual meet", the wrestler not only wins the match for himself, but also gains points for his team. The number of points awarded to a team during a dual meet depends on the victory condition. It is possible for a team to lose team points in certain infractions, such as unsportsmanlike conduct, flagrant misconduct, and unauthorized questioning of the referee by the coach.

==== Summary of team scoring in a dual meet ====
Victory Condition	Number of Team Points Awarded
Fall (Pin)	6
Forfeit	6
Default	6
Disqualification	6
Technical Fall (win by 15 or more points)	5
Major Decision (win by 8 to 14 points)	4
Decision (win by 7 points or less)	3

In a dual meet, when all team points are totaled, the team with the most points wins the competition. In all victory cases, the junior varsity and varsity competitions are scored separately. If there is a tie between teams, the tie is broken by one team point being awarded to the winning team based on certain criteria.

=== Tournament scoring ===
In a tournament, most of the team points are scored for advancement. A team winning a match in the championship bracket would be awarded two team advancement points; one advancement point would be awarded if a team won a match in the consolation bracket. The corresponding team points also apply if a wrestler from the team gained a bye and then won his next match in that bracket. Two additional points are awarded for victories by fall, default, disqualification, and forfeit. One and one-half additional points are awarded for technical fall victories. One additional point is awarded for major decisions. A team can then win a certain number of placement points if its wrestlers have placed individually in the championship and consolation brackets.whole teams are awarded placements based on their total number of victories.

Individual placement points are also awarded as given minimum placements are clinched. In a tournament scoring eight places, the winner of a quarterfinal in the championship bracket, where first and second places are awarded, would win three place points. The winner of a semifinal in the championship bracket would win nine place points. The winners of first and second place would then win four additional place points. In the consolation bracket, where third and fifth places are awarded, those wrestlers who reach the quarterfinal round will receive one place point.

The winner of a semifinal match in the consolation bracket would receive four place points. The winners of third and fifth place receive two additional place points. The winner of seventh place receives one additional place point. A more detailed account of how individual and team points are awarded for tournaments is given on pages 47 to 50 of the 2008-09 NFHS Wrestling Rules Book.

== Folkstyle age-group levels ==
At young ages, independent tournaments are often played in the freestyle and Greco-Roman styles. There are also tournaments where wrestlers compete in a style very similar to collegiate or high school (scholastic) wrestling. To differentiate this style from freestyle and Greco-Roman, the term "folkstyle wrestling" is a more commonly used phrase than the term collegiate wrestling or scholastic wrestling. In many places in the United States, there are small associations known as wrestling clubs designed to introduce young people to the sport of wrestling, many of whom are even as young as 3 to 5 years old. Often these wrestling clubs are benefitted by the experience of older wrestlers, particularly those who wrestle in middle school and high school. The rules governing youth matches largely correspond to those of the National Federation of State High School Associations (NFHS), with shorter periods (generally, depending on the age divisions, the periods typically last anywhere from one to one and a half minutes) and other modifications.

The injuries sustained while participating in scholastic wrestling are as follows. 68% of injuries are due to lack of training while participating in conditioning (asthma attacks, etc.) 21% of injuries are sustained to the ankles of participants. 8% of those injuries are sustained while in conditioning. Injuries in matches stand at 11%, with 83% of injuries sustained to the ankles due to weak shoewear, and to the groin.

There is, however, much less visible organization of wrestling in the freestyle and Greco-Roman styles for young wrestlers, especially at the high school and college age levels. Many high school and college students do compete in freestyle and Greco-Roman dual meets and tournaments however with great success, some of which are on the regional and national levels.

Similarly, the differences between collegiate (folkstyle) wrestling and the international styles are enough to create potential disadvantages to the wrestlers not growing up focusing on the international styles. However, some would argue that the real reason the United States does not typically fare as well in international wrestling competitions is because of the greater focus much of the rest of the world places on the sport. USA Wrestling and the Amateur Athletic Union currently sponsors duals, state, regional, and national competitions in folkstyle, freestyle, and Greco-Roman for elementary and middle school age students, as well as for all ages.

== Weight loss ==
Cutting weight is a common occurrence in the sport of wrestling. The process of cutting weight allows a wrestler to compete at a lower weight class, facing lighter opponents. The advantage is gained when the wrestler loses only water-weight and fat-weight, but retains lean body mass. The wrestler then re-hydrates himself after weighing-in but before competition begins. If done properly, a wrestler who does cut weight can gain a very significant strength and weight advantage over opponents who do not.

Athletes can cut weight in an unhealthy way, with negative short and long-term effects. Dehydration can result when a wrestler severely reduces intake of fluids while maintaining rigorous daily workouts. This may result in cramps or, in extreme cases, heatstroke and swelling of the brain which causes seizures and hypovolemic shock. Malnutrition can also result if cutting weight over long periods of time. Long term weight cutting can mean that a wrestler does not intake essential nutrients like protein, calories, vitamin B, vitamin B_{2}, iron, and zinc; this can result in depression, muscular atrophy, and fevers.

Some wrestlers, if weigh-in time is approaching and they have not yet reached their weight class, will resort to desperate measures such as throwing up or abusing diuretics to quickly lose the remaining weight. Extreme weight cutting can have similar effects to anorexia nervosa and bulimia but results from entirely different psychological mechanisms.

Every state in American high school wrestling uses national hydration assessment tests. These tests analyze body fat percentages at the alpha weight and determine how much weight a wrestler can lose each week. When a wrestler reaches the minimum body fat percentage of 7% of their alpha fat composition it is illegal for the wrestler to cut any more weight (12% for females). This system is meant to make cutting weight as healthy as possible and reduce the negative side effects of cutting.

Unhealthy methods of food consumption and dieting has persisted within the training regimen of wrestlers. A study including 243 collegiate wrestling programs in Divisions I, II, and III observed that these tendencies are ingrained within them. The results of the study showed that most of these kids began wrestling between the ages of 8-10 and begun the process of “cutting weight” at 13–14 years of age on average. Starting such a physically straining habit at such a young age further enforces the notion that victory should come at any cost, turning such bad habits into common practice. Analysis of nutrition practices of high school wrestlers indicates that roughly 4.8-8.0% test subjects displayed forms of disordered eating. The methods of weight loss according to these results reveal numerous disordered forms of eating that result in health issues such as intentional dehydration (≈65%), rubber suits (≈40%), diet pills (≈6%) and vomiting (≈4%). For high school athletes to be making such drastic alterations in their nutritional health, it is fair to say that collegiate wrestlers continue the trend, if not exceeds the likes of their high school counterparts.

Training habits developed by collegiate wrestlers counteract the stereotypical notion that male athletes are not at risk for eating disorders, since they often use extreme methods of cutting weight, such as diuretics and self-induced vomiting. According to a study of 42 collegiate wrestlers, these male athletes tested higher in standardized measures of possessing eating disorders than any of their female counterparts or other athletes that do not have any weight requirement. Roughly 63 percent of collegiate wrestlers have been found to partake in consistent fasting as a means of losing weight, which can lead to unhealthy nutritional imbalances. One negative outcome as a result of rapid weight loss can be a significant fluid loss, potentially having lethal consequences such as an imbalanced core temperature, risk of cardiac arrhythmia, and renal damage. The stress placed on these student athletes to maintain peak physical shape at all costs and the weight and body ideals dictated by society also play a key role in the overall development of a wrestler's unhealthy habits.

Wrestlers face exterior pressures in order to maintain their physique including scholarship opportunities and expectations to succeed. As a result, collegiate wrestlers are part of the subgroup of male athletes of which training can result in dangerous physiological consequences, even though male athletes are generally less susceptible to eating disorders than their female counterpart. A 1993 study done on intercollegiate wrestlers found that 1.7 percent of those who utilized extreme measures of rapid weight loss suffered from bulimia nervosa. The study also found that 43% of wrestlers partake in training that could be categorized as having bulimia nervosa, outlined by the study's criteria identified in the study's questionnaire.

== In popular culture ==
Films with plots related to high school wrestling include:

- Take Down (1979)
- Vision Quest (1985)
- Reversal (2001)
- Going to the Mat (2004)
- Personal Effects (2008)
- Legendary (2010)
- Takedowns & Falls (2010)
- The Hammer (2010)
- Win Win (2011)
- American Wrestler: The Wizard (2016)
- First Match (2018)

== See also ==
- Collegiate wrestling
- National Wrestling Hall of Fame and Museum
