= Bellyfruit =

- DVD cover
- Directed by: Kerri Green
- Written by: Maria Bernhard; Susannah Blinkoff; Janet Borrus; Kerri Green
- Produced by: Robert Bauer; Bonnie Dickenson
- Starring: Tamara LaSeon Bass; Tonatzin Mondragon; Kelly Vint Castro; Michael Peña; T.E. Russell
- Cinematography: Peter Calvin
- Edited by: Carmel Juneau
- Music by: Jay Gruska
- Distributed by: The Asylum; Seventh Art Releasing
- Release date: 1999
- Running time: 87 minutes
- Country: United States
- Language: English
- Budget: $1 million

Bellyfruit is a 1999 American independent drama film about teen pregnancy directed and co-written by Kerri Green. The film is the first feature film released by The Asylum.

== Overview ==
Bellyfruit is an adaptation of an original stage play of the same title which premiered at the Los Angeles Theatre Center on March 16, 1996. The play is a culmination of written works and theatrical performances developed from the stories of the women from Ramona High School and the Pacoima Young Mothers writing program. Playing the roles of the teen mothers in the original stage production of Bellyfruit were actresses Bonnie Dickensen, Tanya Wright, Jude Herrera, and Patrice Pitman Quinn. The stage play was produced by Independent Women Artists and performed as a benefit for Gramercy Group Homes in Los Angeles. It was also directed by Kerri Green, and was written by Green, Maria Bernhard, Susannah Blinkoff, and Janet Borrus.

== Cast ==
- Kelly Vint Castro as Christina
- Tonatzin Mondragon as Aracely
- T.E. Russell as Damon
- Michael Peña as Oscar
- James DuMont as Lou
- Melody Garrett as Doctor
- Ruben Madera as Eddie
- Luis Chávez as Enrique
- Jeremy John Wells as Joe

== Reception ==
Variety found that the film is "a sympathetic portrait of the girls that, thankfully, remains free of sentiment. But surprisingly, it’s Pena’s understated performance that resonates the most. Bellyfruit, mounted first as a play, has a gritty look and feel that serve its material well."
