= Checkered Flag or Crash =

1977 film by Alan Gibson

- theatrical poster
- Directed by: Alan Gibson
- Written by: Michael Allin
- Produced by: Fred Weintraub; Paul Heller
- Starring: Joe Don Baker; Susan Sarandon
- Cinematography: Alan Hume
- Edited by: Allan Holzman
- Music by: Norman Sachs; Mel Mandel
- Distributed by: Universal Pictures
- Release date: 1977
- Running time: 95 minutes
- Country: United States
- Language: English

Checkered Flag or Crash is a 1977 American adventure comedy film about off-road racing through the Philippines jungle, starring Joe Don Baker and Susan Sarandon and featuring Larry Hagman, Alan Vint and Parnelli Jones. It was written by Michael Allin and directed by Alan Gibson.

== Plot ==
Hard-charging race car driver "Walkaway" Madden (Baker), nicknamed that because of his history of walking away from car crashes, just wants to win the big Manilla 1000 off-road race. Photojournalist C.C. Wainwright (Sarandon) intends to ride with him in that race. But Walkaway just wants to get rid of her. Fast-talking promoter Bo Cochran (Hagman) wants the race completed by any means necessary.

== Cast ==
- Joe Don Baker as "Walkaway" Madden
- Susan Sarandon as C.C. Wainwright
- Larry Hagman as Bo Cochran
- Alan Vint as "Doc" Pyle
- Parnelli Jones as Himself
- Logan Clarke as Ringer
- Daina House as Rider In Black

== Production ==
Susan Sarandon, Larry Hagman, and members of the crew dyed Easter eggs on Easter while under the influence of psilocybin mushrooms.
