= Jimi Petulla =

American film producer

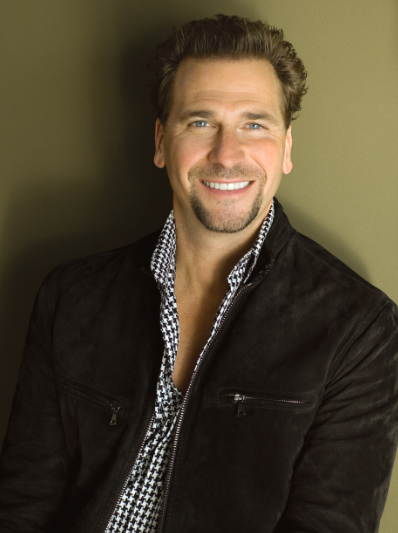
- Born: August 6, 1960 (age 66)
- Education: Oil City High School (Oil City, PA)
- Occupations: CEO of RRF Inc., Educator, Entrepreneur, Filmmaker

Jimi Petula (born August 6, 1960) is an American filmmaker, entrepreneur and educator who is known for his Mentor/Apprentice approach to learning. He is the founder and CEO of RRF, Inc., which offers mentor based courses in film, recording, and radio.

== Career as an educator ==
As founder and Chief Executive Officer (CEO) of the Recording Connection, Radio Connection, and Film Connection, Jimi Petulla is currently involved in developing strategic alliances with leaders in the entertainment industry to better serve graduates of these schools of Recording Radio Film Connection & CASA Schools® (RRFC). Petulla conceived of the mentor/apprentice approach to education for the arts back in 1986 and has been refining it ever since.

Petulla has recently finished a new film, Trust in Love based on his original screenplay. The film is a modern divorce story told from the point of view of the husband-father.

== Radio career ==
Petulla started his career in media as a disc jockey at WOYL in Oil City, Pennsylvania while still in high school. After graduating from Oil City High School, Petulla moved to Cleveland, Ohio for a disc jockey job at Y103 FM.

Two years later, the station’s general manager moved to the Bay Area and took Petulla with him to be his drive time DJ at KFOX radio in San Jose, California. While working there, Petulla was approached by the Columbia School of Broadcasting (CSB) who were impressed by the radio commercials he had done for them.

Soon, Petulla was teaching a course for CSB on radio broadcasting and eventually became General Manager of their San Jose branch. While working in this position Petulla decided that classroom education really wasn’t suited for education in broadcasting or other media. He conceived of the mentor/apprentice method of education and presented it to the executive board at CSB. When CSB declined to pursue Petulla’s vision, he left the company and formed Radio Connection.

== Career as an entrepreneur ==
Radio Connection was launched in 1986, with students placed by Petulla inside a real radio station to serve as apprentices while learning the trade from an on-air radio DJ. Petulla launched Recording Connection in 1989 which again used the mentor/apprentice method of education for aspiring audio engineers and music producers.

Along the way, Petulla became interested in movie-making and in 1999 launched Film Connection, a mentor-apprentice school for aspiring filmmakers.

Today, Radio Connection, Recording Connection, Film Connection, and CASA Schools are part of RRFC, Inc.

== Film career ==
Petulla’s career in filmmaking started as an actor. He first appeared as "Toby" in Silk n' Sabotage in 1994.

In 1997, he appeared in the part of "Bennett" in The P.A.C.K. series from Mattel.

In 2001, he wrote, starred and produced the film Reversal, which drew heavily on his experiences as a high school wrestler.

In 2006, Petulla and Brian Kraft worked on the independent film The Brandon Corey Story in which he played the lead role and served as producer. In 2009 they released The Fall of America and the Western World.

In 2024, Petulla released "Trust in Love," about a high school kid with a music producer dad (Petulla) who has managed to let work break up his family. In addition to his role in the film, Petulla produced and wrote the screenplay which has won 22 film festival awards.
