= Ellie Gall =

Australian actress (born 1996)

- Born: 5 May 1996 (age 29); Manly, New South Wales, Australia
- Occupation: Actress
- Years active: 2009—present

Ellie Gall (born 5 May 1996) is an Australian actress. She portrayed the main role of Catherine Langford alongside Connor Trinneer in the science fiction web-series Stargate Origins.

== Filmography ==
=== Television ===
Year	Title	Role	Notes
2009	Crime Investigation Australia	Sian Kingi	1 episode
2012	Puberty Blues	Raquel	16 episodes
2013	Mind Over Maddie	Ambition	Main role
2013	Home and Away	Freya Lund	1 episode
2014	A Place to Call Home	Colleen Kilgour	5 episodes
2016	Wham Bam Thank You Ma'am	Katie	1 episode
2017	A Midsummer's Nightmare	Hannah Becker	Television film
2018	Stargate Origins	Catherine Langford	Main role
2018	Ash vs Evil Dead	Rachel	1 episode
2019	Blind	Stacey	7 episodes
2024–2025	Home and Away	Nerida Mullins	Guest Role

=== Film ===
Year	Title	Role	Notes
2010	1MC: Something of Vengeance	Danila	
2011	This Happenstance	Netball Player	Short film
2013	Bloomers	Emma	Short film
2018	Girl Falling	Sarah	Short film
2018	Mary and Margaret	Margaret	Short film
