= National Animal Rights Day =

Annual global event to raise awareness of animal rights

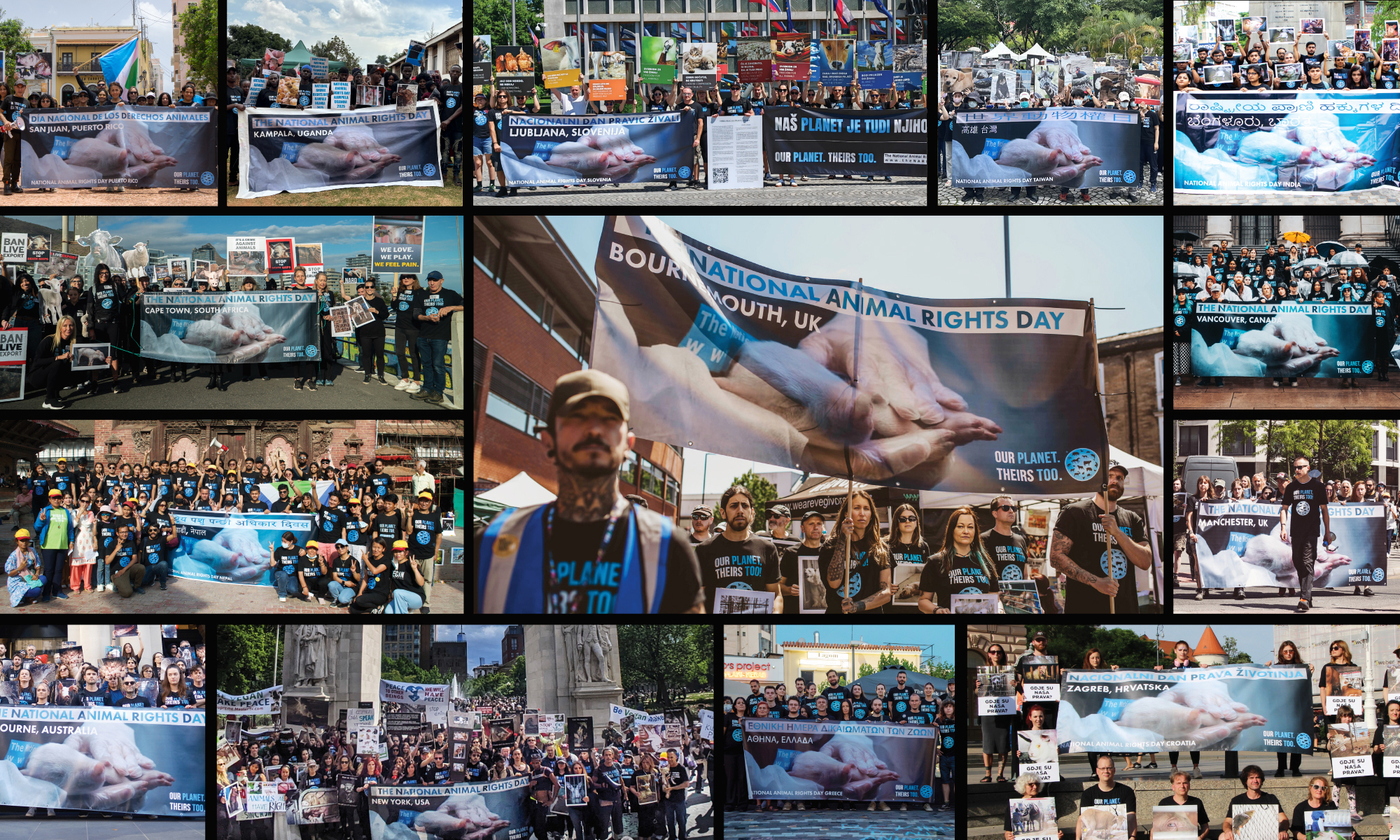
The National Animal Rights Day around the world

The National Animal Rights Day (commonly abbreviated: NARD) is an annual day observed in more than 50 countries around the world on the first Sunday in June, for the purpose of giving a voice to all animals and raising awareness for their rights. It was created by actor and animal rights activist Aylam Orian in 2011, and established as a global annual event by the US animal rights group Our Planet. Theirs Too.

On this day, special events are held simultaneously in major cities in each country, which all start with a public memorial ceremony for the billions of animals killed every year by human hands (often with activists holding the bodies of deceased farm animals in their arms), and end with a celebration of the progress being made towards ending the suffering of animals. The events also include the public reading and signing of The Declaration of Animal Rights.

Many notable animal rights activists and celebrities have participated in the NARD events over the years, including musicians Moby and Toby Morse, actors Joaquin Phoenix, Rooney Mara, Donna D’Errico, Alexandra Paul and Nina Bergman, writer Dr. Will Tuttle, and activists Ronnie Lee and Tash Peterson.
