= Alan Vint =

American actor (1944–2006)

Alan Richard Vint (November 11, 1944 – August 16, 2006) was an American character actor.

Vint was born in Tulsa, Oklahoma. He appeared in a number of supporting roles during the 1970s in films such as The McMasters (1970), Two-Lane Blacktop (1971), The Panic in Needle Park (1971), Welcome Home, Soldier Boys (1971), Unholy Rollers (1972), Badlands (1973), Macon County Line (1974), Earthquake (1974), Breakout (1975), Checkered Flag or Crash (1977) and The Lady in Red (1979). He also made guest appearances on such television series as Centennial, Police Story, Emergency!, Hawaii Five-O, Adam-12, Lou Grant and Baretta.

Vint appeared in several films with his brother Jesse Vint. He was married to Susan Mullen and had three daughters — Kelly, Kate and Megan Vint, also actors. Vint and Mullen eventually divorced. He died of pneumonia in Sherman Oaks, California.

== Film ==
Year	Title	Role
1970	The McMasters	Hank
1971	The Panic in Needle Park	Hotch
1971	Two-Lane Blacktop	Man in Roadhouse
1971	Welcome Home, Soldier Boys	Kid
1972	Unholy Rollers	Greg
1973	Badlands	Deputy (Tom)
1974	Macon County Line	Chris Dixon
1974	Earthquake	Ralph
1975	Breakout	Harve
1977	Checkered Flag or Crash	Doc Pyle
1979	The Lady in Red	Melvin Purvis
1982	The Ballad of Gregorio Cortez	Mike Trimmell
1993	Family Prayers	Delivery Man
1999	Malevolence	Deputy Warden

=== Television ===
Year	Title	Role	Notes
1969	Bonanza	Pete Hill	Episode: “To Stop a War”
1969	Then Came Bronson	Billy Huskie	Episode: “Your Love Is Like a Demolition Derby in My Heart”
1969	The High Chaparral	Tim Parker	Episode: “The Little Thieves”
1970	The Name of the Game	Buzz	Episode: “The King of Denmark”
1970	Room 222	Bob	Episode: “Funny Money”
1970	Adam-12	Ken Tucker	Episode: “Log 144: Bank Robbery”
1970	The Bold Ones: The New Doctors	Rehab Speaker	Episode: “This Will Really Kill You”
1970	The Young Lawyers	Williams	Episode: “MacGillicuddy Always Was a Pain in the Neck”
1971	Cade's County	Jimmie-John Kingman	Episode: Company Town
1971	Nichols	Springer Brother	Episode: “Where Did Everybody Go?”
1972	The Glass House	Bree	Television Movie
1972	Hawaii Five-O	Thomas Robert Ralston	Episode: R&R R&R
1972	The Family Rico	John Ryan	Television Movie
1972	The Rookies	Robert Alpert	Episode: “A Deadly Velocity”
1973	My Darling Daughters' Anniversary	Biff Brynner	Television Movie
1975	Police Story	Mike Harris	Episode: “Sniper”
1975	The Deadly Tower	Tim Davis	Television Movie
1975	Emergency!	Drive-Rite Driving Instructor	Episode: “To Buy or Not to Buy”
1976	Bronk	Jackson Blue	Episode: “Jackson Blue”
1976	Switch	Nate Lear	Episode: “One of Our Zeppelins Is Missing”
1976	Petrocelli	Joe Davis	Episode: “Deadly Journey”
1977	Code R	Chuck	Episode: “Black Out”
1978	Baretta	Jeremy	Episode: “I’ll Take You to Lunch”
1978	David Cassidy: Man Undercover	Pauly	Episode: “Running the Hill”
1979	Centennial	Beeley Garrett	Episode: “The Winds of Death”
1980	Lou Grant	Len Huskie	Episode: “Dogs”
1980	Belle Starr	Grat Dalton	Television Movie
1982	American Playhouse	Mike Trimmell	Episode: “The Ballad of Gregorio Cortez”
1988	Spenser: For Hire	LeClerc	Episode: “Haunting”
1995	The Wharf Rat	Eli	Television Movie
