= Universal Declaration on Animal Welfare =

Proposed inter-governmental agreement on animal rights

The Universal Declaration on Animal Welfare (UDAW) is a proposed inter-governmental agreement to recognise that animals are sentient, to prevent cruelty and reduce suffering, and to promote standards on the welfare of animals such as farm animals, companion animals, animals in scientific research, draught animals, wildlife and animals in recreation.

It was proposed that the declaration would be adopted by the United Nations. If endorsed by the UN (as the Universal Declaration of Human Rights was) the UDAW would be a non-binding set of principles that acknowledge the importance of the sentience of animals and human responsibilities towards them. The principles were designed to encourage and enable national governments to introduce and improve animal protection legislation and initiatives.

== History ==
The UDAW was conceived in 2000 by a group of animal welfare organizations including World Animal Protection (formerly the World Society for the Protection of Animals), which now acts as its Secretariat. It is supported by a planning group including Compassion in World Farming, Royal Society for the Prevention of Cruelty to Animals (RSPCA), the International Fund for Animal Welfare (IFAW) and the Humane Society of the United States.

In 2003 in the Philippines, the Manila Conference on Animal Welfare was attended by 19 government delegations with the European Council, United States and Saipan as observers. A foundation text with core principles for a UDAW was agreed.

In 2005, the UDAW inter-governmental steering committee was formed and representatives of the governments of Kenya, India, Costa Rica, the Czech Republic and the Philippines agreed to champion the initiative. They led a group of governments whose officials have stated support in the following years, including Cambodia, Fiji, Latvia, Lithuania, New Zealand, Poland, Slovenia, Tanzania and the United Kingdom.

In May 2007, the World Organisation for Animal Health (OIE) passed a resolution supporting the development of a UDAW in principle, as did the Commonwealth Veterinary Association (CVA) and the Federation of Veterinarians of Europe (FVE). In August 2008, the national veterinary associations of Chile, New Zealand, the UK, the Philippines, Thailand and Colombia have all given public backing for a UDAW.

In April 2008, Eric Martlew MP put forward an early day motion in the House of Commons of the United Kingdom that "calls upon the Government to give its full and publicly-stated support for this initiative, including active support within the European Union and the United Nations."

The Food and Agriculture Organisation of the United Nations recognised UDAW in 2009, integrating animal welfare into its poverty alleviation, disaster relief and livestock development programmes and stating in a report of an expert meeting that, "The Draft Universal Declaration on Animal Welfare (World Animal Protection 2007)... provides a valuable guiding philosophy for efforts to improve the welfare of animals". And, in the same year, the Council of the European Union discussed the proposal for a Universal Declaration on Animal Welfare and agreed that, "animal welfare is an issue of common concern and importance" It encouraged the EU Commission "to support and initiate further international initiatives to raise awareness and create a greater consensus on animal welfare". It also invited the member states and the commission, within their respective competencies, "to support, in principle, the UDAW initiative in the relevant international fora".

There have been several drafts of the declaration, with the most recent proposed in 2014. This draft takes into account feedback from UN member states, international organisations and non-governmental organisations. It develops the earlier draft arising from the Manila conference on animal welfare (2003) and the Costa Rica draft (2005) which incorporated suggestions made by the Steering Committee.

It has been argued that a UDAW is consistent with, and could help secure the achievement of, the UN Millennium Development Goals. and the subsequent Sustainable Development Goals. The declaration as of October 2014 had the support, in principle, of 46 countries and of ministries from 17 further countries. More than 2.5 million people from a wide variety of UN member states have supported the public campaign. Some have argued that the agreement does not go far enough and should guarantee animal rights instead of simply animal welfare.

=== Historical background ===
The lack of success in shaping internationally binding charters on animal rights has not been for want of trying. People in modern times have attempted to identify and advance the rights of animals at least since the 18th century. Credit usually goes to Henry Stephens Salt (1851–1939) for writing the first book on animal rights, published in 1892 and subsequently. And Salt traces efforts back to John Lawrence (1753–1839), one of the earliest modern writers on animal rights and welfare. Lawrence argued in his 1796 book, A Philosophical and Practical Treatise on Horses and the Moral Duties of Man Towards Brute Creation (T N Longman: London), that we have to care for animals and common law should support this principle in practice

The 20th century saw a number of international declarations supporting animal rights. Perhaps the most prominent venture was the Universal Declaration for Animal Rights which was announced by The French League of Animal Rights on 15 October 1978 at the United Nations Educational, Scientific and Cultural Organization (UNESCO) house in Paris (not by UNESCO itself!). Among the Declaration's pronouncements were that all animals have the same rights to existence, no animal shall be ill-treated or subject to cruelty, animals shall command the protection of law, and dead animals shall be treated with respect. The Declaration, however, waned and faded away before it could reach significant levels of international agreement. An attempt to create a more legally binding UN Convention on Animal Health and Protection (UNCAHP) in 2019, seems to have stalled as well. The idea of a (universal) Declaration of Animal Rights which would be endorsed by the UN with the same status as the Universal Declaration of Human Rights, was revived in 2011 by the US animal rights organization Our Planet. Theirs Too., which drafted The Declaration of Animal Rights, and proclaimed it publicly on 5 June 2011, at the first National Animal Rights Day event in New York City. Since then, this Declaration has been gaining momentum and signatures around the world.

At the same time, several leading animal welfare organizations have started campaigning for the United Nations to adopt a different declaration, this time on the welfare of animals: the Universal Declaration on Animal Welfare, based on the rationale that animal welfare would have better chances of even being discussed at the UN level, than animal rights.

The organizations behind this declaration envisaged that signatory countries to the document would recognize animals as sentient beings, and hoped that their declaration would make animal welfare an important global issue, pave the way for legally binding international agreements on animal welfare and hasten a better deal for animals worldwide. The declaration would also underscore the importance of animal welfare as part of the moral development of humanity. So far a number of United Nations member states have acted as a steering group to advance the initiative at the UN. See Universal Declaration on Animal Welfare, below, for a draft copy.

== Overview of the proposed declaration ==
A draft text of the declaration, most recently updated by the OIE in 2014 provides a basis for states and peoples to work to improve their national animal welfare legislation, introduce animal welfare legislation in countries where it does not currently exist, encourage those businesses which use animals to keep welfare at the forefront of their policies, link humanitarian, development and animal welfare agendas nationally and internationally, inspire positive change in public attitudes towards animal welfare.

The declaration calls for:

- Recognition that animals are living, sentient beings and therefore deserve due consideration and respect
- Recognition that animal welfare includes animal health and encompasses both the physical and psychological state of the animal and that good practices in animal welfare can have major benefits for humans and the environment
- Recognition that humans inhabit this planet with other species and other forms of life and that all forms of life co-exist within an interdependent ecosystem
- Recognition of the importance of the ongoing work of the World Organisation for Animal Health (OIE) in setting global standards for animal welfare and that member states should adopt all necessary measures to give effect to the principles of UDAW, including the implementation of these standards
- Acknowledgment that many states already have a system of legal protection for animals, both domestic and wild and that the continued effectiveness of these systems must be ensured, with the development of better and more comprehensive animal welfare provisions
- Awareness that the Five Freedoms (freedom from hunger, thirst and malnutrition; freedom from fear and distress; freedom from physical and thermal discomfort; freedom from pain, injury and disease; and freedom to express normal patterns of behaviour) and the Three Rs (reduction in numbers of animals, refinement of experimental methods and replacement of animals with non-animal techniques) provide valuable guidance for the use of animals
- Recognition that the provisions contained in this declaration do not affect the rights of any state

The principles of the declaration are:

1. The welfare of animals shall be a common objective for all states and all appropriate steps shall be taken by member states to prevent cruelty to animals and to reduce their suffering.
2. The policies, legislation and standards of animal welfare attained by each state shall be promoted, recognized and observed by improved measures, nationally and internationally. Each member state should care for and treat animals in a humane and sustainable manner in accordance with the principles of the Declaration.
3. All appropriate steps shall be taken by states to prevent cruelty to animals and to reduce their suffering.
4. Appropriate policies, legislation and standards on the welfare of animals will be further developed and elaborated, such as those governing the use and management of farm animals, companion animals, animals in scientific research, draught animals, wildlife animals, and animals in recreation.

== Public campaign ==
The public campaign to gain support for a UDAW, branded 'Animals Matter', was launched in June 2006. It reached one million signatures in December 2007 with the President of Costa Rica Sr. Oscar Arias, becoming the official one millionth signatory and hosting celebrations in San José, Costa Rica, in March 2008. As of 2014, the petition had over 2.5 million signatures and support from people in a variety of UN member states.

== See also ==
- Animal law
- Animal rights by country or territory
- Animal welfare
- Declaration on Great Apes
- List of animal rights advocates
