= Doug Casey =

American economist (born 1946)

- Born: Douglas Robert Casey; May 5, 1946 (age 80); Chicago, Illinois, U.S.
- Education: Georgetown University
- Occupations: Writer; speculator
- Relatives: Eugene B. Casey (father)

Douglas Robert Casey (born May 5, 1946 in Chicago, Illinois) is an American writer, speculator, and the founder and chairman of Casey Research. He describes himself as an anarcho-capitalist influenced by the works of writer and philosopher Ayn Rand.

== Early life and education ==
Casey graduated from Georgetown University in 1968. He was raised Roman Catholic, but later became an atheist.

He is the son of Eugene B. Casey, a multimillionaire real estate developer.

== Career ==
Casey's 1979 book Crisis Investing was number one on The New York Times Non-Fiction Best Seller list in 1980 for 29 consecutive weeks. It was the best-selling financial book of 1980 with 438,640 copies sold.

Casey has a wine and residential sporting estate project called Estancia de Cafayate in Salta Province, Argentina.

Casey has recommended investing in gold.

=== Casey Research ===
Casey Research publishes a financial newsletter from an Austrian School anarcho-capitalist perspective which advises on the purchase of microcap stocks, precious metals, and other investments.

=== Views and approach ===
Casey describes himself as a contrarian. He applies this view to investment, economic interpretations, and government.

He has said, "You've got to be a speculator today. It's no longer possible to work hard and save your money and get ahead in life."

Casey has been critical of an interventionist foreign policy.

== Bibliography ==
- —— (1982). Strategic Investing. Pocket Books. ISBN 9780671438869.
- —— (1976). The International Man. Alexandria House Books. ISBN 9780932496096.
- —— (1979). Crisis Investing: Opportunities and Profits in the Coming Great Depression. Stratford Press. ISBN 9780936906003.
- —— (1993). Crisis Investing for the Rest of the 90s. Carol Publishing. ISBN 9780806516127.
- —— (2012). Totally Incorrect: Conversations with Doug Casey. Casey Research. ISBN 9780988285132.
- —— (2013). Right on the Money. John Wiley & Sons. ISBN 9781118856222.
- —— (2016). Speculator. With John Hunt. High Ground Novels. ISBN 9780985933258.
- —— (2017). Drug Lord. With John Hunt. High Ground Novels. ISBN 9781947449077.
- —— (2020). Assassin. With John Hunt. High Ground Novels. ISBN 9781947449091.
