= Saw X =

2023 film by Kevin Greutert

- Theatrical release poster
- Directed by: Kevin Greutert
- Written by: Peter Goldfinger; Josh Stolberg
- Produced by: Oren Koules; Mark Burg
- Starring: Tobin Bell; Shawnee Smith; Synnøve Macody Lund; Steven Brand; Renata Vaca; Michael Beach
- Cinematography: Nick Matthews
- Edited by: Kevin Greutert
- Music by: Charlie Clouser
- Production company: Twisted Pictures
- Distributed by: Lionsgate Films
- Release date: September 29, 2023
- Running time: 118 minutes
- Country: United States
- Language: English
- Budget: $13 million
- Box office: $125.3 million

Saw X is a 2023 American horror film directed and edited by Kevin Greutert, and written by Peter Goldfinger and Josh Stolberg. It is the tenth installment in the Saw film series, following Spiral (2021) and stars Tobin Bell and Shawnee Smith, who reprise their roles from the previous films, alongside Synnøve Macody Lund, Steven Brand, Renata Vaca, and Michael Beach. Set between the events of Saw (2004) and Saw II (2005), the film sees John Kramer (Bell) travelling to Mexico in hopes that an experimental procedure may cure his terminal cancer. John later discovers that the operation is a fake, prompting him to kidnap those responsible and subject them to his trademark death traps as revenge, with Amanda Young (Smith) acting as his accomplice.

A tenth installment was reported to be in development with Twisted Pictures in April 2021, when Stolberg and Goldfinger, writers for the previous two entries of the series, announced that they had completed the script in December 2021. Greutert, who had directed two other installments of the series and edited six, was also confirmed as the film's director. Filming took place between October 2022 and February 2023 in Mexico City.

Saw X was theatrically released by Lionsgate Films on September 29, 2023. It grossed $125 million worldwide and received generally positive reviews from critics, making it the best-reviewed Saw film. Following a tumultuous pre-production regarding a follow-up to Saw X, Blumhouse Productions bought out Twisted Pictures's stake in the franchise in June 2025, with Lionsgate retaining substantial ownership, making this film the last Saw film to be produced by Twisted Pictures. An eleventh film is in development.

== Plot ==
John Kramer is told he has only months to live due to advanced brain cancer. He attends a cancer support group meeting and befriends Henry Kessler, who later claims he has been cured by an experimental Norwegian cancer treatment conducted by a group led by Dr. Finn Pederson. A desperate John contacts the doctor's daughter Cecilia, who refers him to her clinic outside Mexico City.

On arrival in Mexico, John is driven to the clinic and introduced to Cecilia and her team—anesthesiologist Mateo, nurse Valentina, and Dr. Cortez—as well as patients Gabriela and Parker and the caretaker's young son Carlos, with whom he bonds. John goes under for surgery and awakens to Cecilia telling him that he is now cancer-free. Finding a new lease on life, he purchases a gift for Gabriela. However, upon returning to the clinic, he finds it abandoned. He uncovers a video simulating his supposed brain surgery and removes his bandages to find no scar on his head, revealing the entire operation to be a scam.

Deducing that "Dr. Cortez" was his taxi driver Diego in disguise, John kidnaps and interrogates him, then forces him to play a "game" where he must remove pipe bombs lashed to his arms by cutting through his flesh, which he completes successfully. Meanwhile, Jigsaw's apprentice Amanda Young helps him abduct Cecilia, Mateo, Valentina, and Gabriela. They wake up in the clinic, now subjects in Jigsaw's games.

Valentina is tasked with severing her leg with a Gigli saw and extracting enough bone marrow to trigger a scale and deactivate the trap. She manages to amputate her leg but is unable to collect enough marrow, and a second Gigli saw decapitates her. Cecilia later uses Valentina's intestines as a rope to retrieve her phone and call for help, but Amanda shocks her into submission and confiscates the phone.

Parker breaks into the clinic, demanding his money back. Amanda restrains him while Mateo is forced to drill into his own skull and remove a piece of cerebral tissue to dissolve in a beaker and obtain a key. Although he successfully performs the task, the tissue fails to dissolve in time, and a heated mask closes over his face, killing him. Next, Gabriela is suspended from shackles and subjected to ionizing radiation, tasked with freeing herself by using a sledgehammer to break her shackled limbs. She succeeds, but before Amanda can take her to a hospital, Parker forces them at gunpoint to release Cecilia.

Cecilia kills Gabriela by breaking her neck and reveals she called Parker, who is part of the scam, to rescue her. She forces John to chain himself into the trap meant for her. When she hears Carlos outside, she takes him and chains him opposite John, knowing that he would never hurt a child. The trap begins waterboarding them with blood. Parker and Cecilia go to retrieve their bag of stolen cash from John's control room but activate a tripwire, sealing them both in the room and freeing John and Carlos. Flashbacks reveal that Diego outed all of the scammers—including Parker and Henry—and that John tricked Cecilia into luring Parker to the facility. A deadly chemical gas begins filling the room; the only respite is a ventilation hole large enough for one person's head, forcing Cecilia and Parker to fight each other. Cecilia kills Parker but can only watch as John, Amanda, and Carlos exit the facility, leaving her trapped.

Sometime later, Henry awakens in a dilapidated bathroom (Note: As first depicted in Saw (2004)) with a new trap strapped to his stomach, overseen by John and Mark Hoffman.

== Cast ==
- Tobin Bell as John Kramer
- Shawnee Smith as Amanda Young
- Synnøve Macody Lund as Cecilia Pederson
- Steven Brand as Parker Sears
- Renata Vaca as Gabriela
- Joshua Okamoto as Diego
- Octavio Hinojosa as Mateo
- Paulette Hernández as Valentina
- Jorge Briseño as Carlos
- Costas Mandylor as Hoffman
- Michael Beach as Henry Kessler
- Isan Beomhyun Lee as a custodian
- David Alfano as a doctor
- Katie Barberi as the cancer support group leader
- Donagh Gordon as Dr. Finn Pederson

== Production ==
=== Development ===
In April 2021, it was reported that a tenth installment in the Saw franchise, titled Saw X, was in development with Twisted Pictures. Screenwriters Josh Stolberg and Peter Goldfinger, who previously penned Jigsaw (2017) and Spiral (2021), announced in December 2021 that the script for Saw X had been completed. Producers Mark Burg and Oren Koules had originally conceived the story for the film as early as 2018; however, development was postponed after Lionsgate Vice Chairman Michael Burns met actor and comedian Chris Rock in Brazil and approved his concept for Spiral. Following the underwhelming box office performance of Spiral, Burg and Koules chose to return to the franchise's core themes and revisit their original concept for the tenth film. Hannah Emily Anderson had originally signed on to reprise her Jigsaw role of Eleanor Bonneville in two more films, none which materialized. In August 2022, Bloody Disgusting confirmed that Saw X would be directed by Kevin Greutert, a longtime editor for the franchise who previously directed Saw VI (2009) and Saw 3D (2010). The project was part of a multi-year co-financing agreement between Lionsgate and Media Capital Technologies, which included a slate of upcoming films, among them Saw X.

=== Casting ===
In October 2022, Tobin Bell was confirmed to reprise the role of John Kramer / Jigsaw. Greutert told Empire that Bell is featured in the film more than any other in the series. Bell was also involved in the film's script and post-production, coming up with extra dialogue that was incorporated into the story after shooting concluded. In December 2022, Synnøve Macody Lund, Steven Brand and Michael Beach joined the cast, along with Renata Vaca, Paulette Hernández, Joshua Okamoto, and Octavio Hinojosa. Shawnee Smith reprises her role as Amanda Young. While never officially announced, Costas Mandylor returned with a cameo of his role as Mark Hoffman. Greutert told Entertainment Weekly that this cameo was "the most fan-servicey thing" he has done.

=== Filming ===
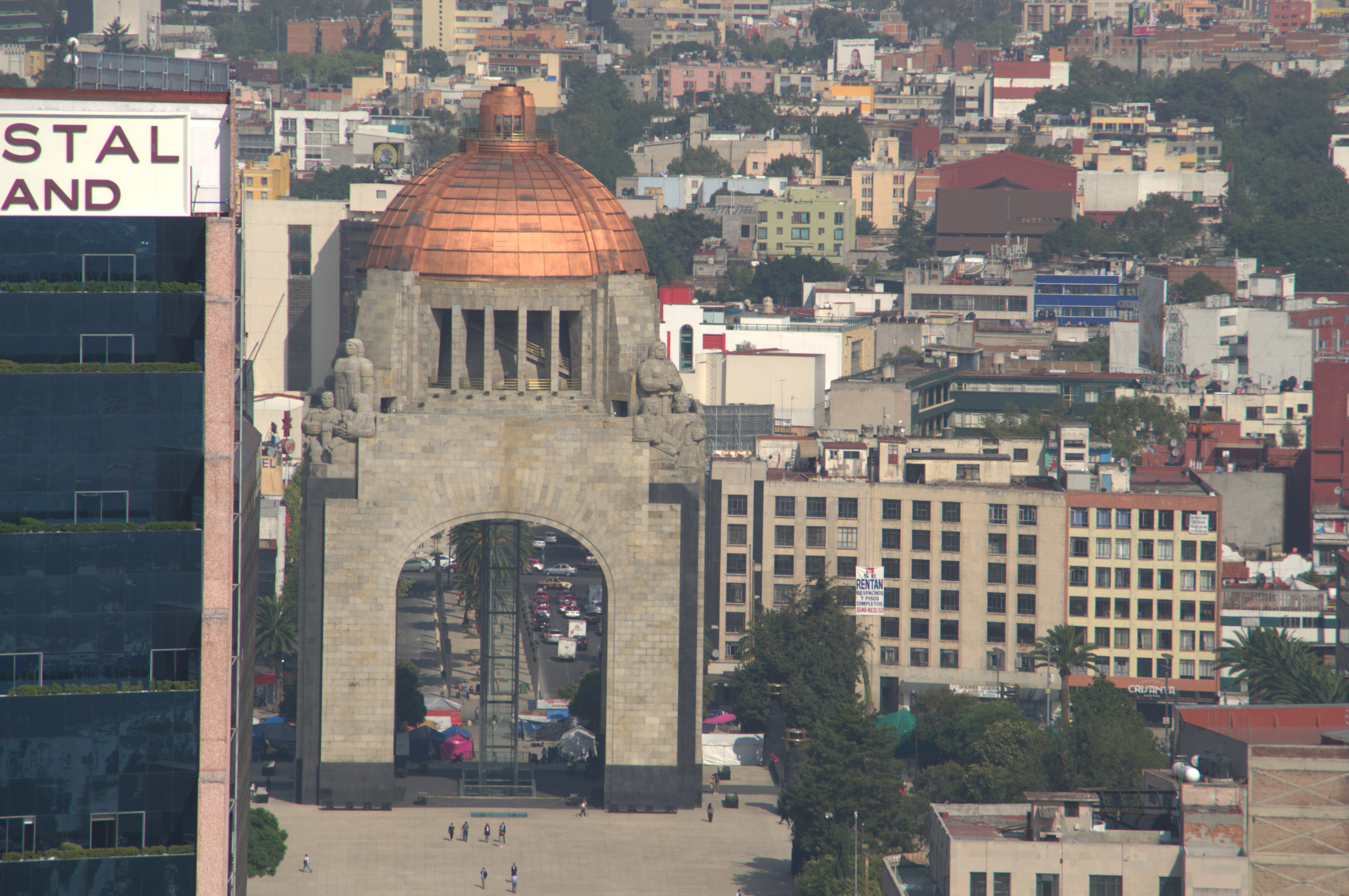
Mexico City, where the film was shot

On a budget of $13 million, principal photography took place on location in Mexico City from late October 2022 to February 2023. The trap designs were more complex than in previous installments, so the filming schedule was split into two parts—three weeks in November and three weeks in January. Greutert told SFX, "We had to make so many prosthetics and machines, and over Christmas, we spent the entirety of it figuring this stuff out".

At Midsummer Scream 2023, cinematographer Nick Matthews said they wanted to pay homage to the earlier Saw films. He explained, "I think for Kevin and I, it was really important that we were able to pay homage to all the early films, we love that the early films are [1.85] (ratio), we love that they're textural, that they're gritty, that there's these really bold, yellow color palettes, and we want to do our work to hearken to that, with pervasive darkness, and really throwing the audience subjectively right into this graphic, gritty world". Production designer Anthony Stabley looked back at the color palette from those mid-2000s films and ensured that all technology, like graphics, seen in Saw X would have been available when those films took place.

=== Post-production ===
Most of the gore was done with practical effects, with CGI only used for touch-ups. The filmmakers considered the use of visual effects to de-age Bell and Smith due to the 17-year gap between their appearances in Saw III (2006), in which their characters both died, and Saw X. However, they decided against it; Greutert expressed his support for this decision, saying that "some of the films that have de-aged their actors, it puts some distance between the character and the audience", feeling that Bell and Smith have some emotional close-ups that should not be altered.

Steve Forner, the film's first assistant editor, had local police called on him during an editing session involving sound design of the custodian's trap. According to Greutert, Forner was working on the scene in his office when the police knocked on the door, citing neighbors' concerns of someone being "tortured to death" inside: "And [Forner] was like, 'Actually, I'm just working on a movie. You can come in and see it if you want.' The cops started laughing. They said, 'We want to, but, you know, you're all right.' It must have been a pretty realistic performance."

== Release ==
=== Marketing ===
On September 9, 2023, Lionsgate announced the return of the Saw Blood Drive, a promotional event allowing audiences to donate blood to the American Red Cross in exchange for free tickets to the opening weekend of Saw X.

On September 13, 2023, a parody of the Nicole Kidman AMC Theatres commercial was published to YouTube and to Lionsgate's social media platforms. It featured a remote-controlled Billy the Puppet on a tricycle in place of Kidman, with some changes to reflect the graphic nature of Saw. While the parody was met with humorous responses by news outlets, it was pulled from Lionsgate's accounts due to a cease and desist order by AMC Theatres.

=== Theatrical ===
Saw X was released theatrically in the United States by Lionsgate Films on September 29, 2023. The film was set to be released on October 27, 2023, before Lionsgate announced at San Diego Comic-Con that it would be moved up to its current date.

=== Home media ===
Saw X was released on PVOD in the United States on October 20, 2023, and on DVD, Blu-ray and 4K UHD on November 21, 2023. The 4K and Blu-ray discs include over three hours of bonus footage, containing a making-of documentary titled Reawakening and deleted scenes. The film was also released alongside the previous nine films in a 20th anniversary collection Blu-ray box set on March 5, 2024. The film grossed $4.1 million in home sales.

== Reception ==
=== Box office ===
Saw X grossed $53.6 million in the United States and Canada, and $71.7 million in other territories, for a worldwide total of $125.3 million.

In the United States and Canada, Saw X was released alongside The Creator, PAW Patrol: The Mighty Movie, and the wide expansion of Dumb Money, and was projected to gross $15–18 million from 3,262 theaters in its opening weekend. It made $8 million on its first day, including $2 million from Thursday night previews. It went on to debut to $18.3 million, finishing second behind PAW Patrol. It was below the average opening weekend of the franchise ($23 million) but higher than recent installments Spiral ($8.8 million in 2021) and Jigsaw ($16.6 million in 2017). The film made $8.2 million in its second weekend and $5.7 million in its third, finishing in third and fourth place, respectively.

Saw X topped the box office in the United Kingdom and Ireland, grossing $2.31 million in the first three days.

=== Critical response ===
The film received positive reviews from critics, (Note: Attributed to multiple sources:) who praised Bell's performance, with many calling it the best entry in the franchise since the first film. On the review aggregator website Rotten Tomatoes, 81% of 152 critics' reviews are positive, with an average rating of 6.5/10. The website's consensus reads: "Led by a franchise-best performance by Tobin Bell, Saw X reinvigorates the series with an installment that has a surprising amount of heart to go with all the gore." Metacritic, which uses a weighted average, assigned the film a score of 60 out of 100, based on 26 critics, indicating "mixed or average" reviews. This made it the highest-rated film of the franchise on both websites, topping the first (50%) and third film (48 out of 100), respectively. Audiences surveyed by CinemaScore gave the film an average grade of B on an A+ to F scale, while those polled at PostTrak gave it an 82% overall positive score, with 62% saying they would definitely recommend the film.

Variety's Owen Gleiberman wrote that Saw X seemed "more like a real movie than many of the films in the series in that there's more talking and less torturing". He was satisfied with that ratio but was concerned if it would "pay off at the box office". He explained, "The torture set pieces in the Saw films are lavish gifts of baroque horror presented to the audience. They are, quite simply, the reason we came." He gave particular praise to Tobin Bell, "with his stare of pitiless wisdom". Frank Scheck of The Hollywood Reporter also praised Bell for his performance, saying "None of this would work nearly as well without Bell, whose raspy voice and menacing gravitas are so riveting that he makes Jigsaw's oft-repeated declaration 'I'd like to play a game' scary as hell."

Beatrice Loayza called Saw X the "most well-groomed Saw film to date" in her review for The New York Times. She continues with: "The story mostly makes sense and Greutert pulls back on the frenetic editing techniques that made the older movies look like the blood and guts equivalent of white noise." Bob Strauss of the San Francisco Chronicle called the film "a well-told tale" and praised its character development and plot twists. Wendy Ide of The Observer gave three stars out of five despite calling the film "unpleasant"—in her review she insists "that's rather the point:.

Helen O'Hara from Empire gave the film a score of two out of five, positively commenting on the blood and gore, calling it "all present and correct". However, O'Hara criticized the film's main focus on Kramer's vulnerability and human side, adding that it "sits at odds with his awful judgmentalism. Let monsters be monsters." Kyle Turner writing for Slant gave the film a score of two and half out of four, saying "The real disappointment is that Shawnee Smith, who makes a return to the series for the first time since Saw VI, is relegated to mostly doing John's dirty work. It's hard out here for a disciple, and Smith hasn't had the chance to show off her chops as an actor since Saw III. But in Saw X, we do get crumbs of what makes her so thrilling as a performer, particularly one in the horror genre: She's all id, a tempest of emotion and fully embodied desperation and psychosis."

== Future ==
In December 2023, Lionsgate announced that a sequel, Saw XI, was scheduled to be released on September 27, 2024. Producer Oren Koules stated the upcoming film would possibly be a direct sequel to Saw X. Kevin Greutert was set to return as the director for the upcoming film. In April 2024, the release date was changed to September 26, 2025, with Never Let Go, another Lionsgate film, taking the previous date. Patrick Melton and Marcus Dunstan, who had previously co-written the films from Saw IV to Saw 3D, turned in a draft of the script in mid-2024. In March 2025, work on Saw XI had reportedly stalled, due to disagreements between the producers.

In June 2025, Blumhouse Productions bought Twisted Pictures' stake in the franchise, with Lionsgate still being involved. In October 2025, Blumhouse owner Jason Blum stated that he was impressed by how the original Saw producers managed to make ten films and now allowed him to continue, announcing his creative outlook of bringing back the creatives involved in the original Saw film, namely the franchise co-creator James Wan, to reinvent the franchise.

In September 2026, an eleventh installment of the franchise was announced to be in development with Mike P. Nelson set to direct alongside James Wan, Leigh Whannell, and Jason Blum producing.
