= Amanda Young =

Fictional character from the Saw franchise

- Saw character
- Shawnee Smith as Amanda Young in Saw III (2006)
- First appearance: Saw (2004)
- Last appearance: Saw X (2023)
- Created by: James Wan; Leigh Whannell
- Portrayed by: Shawnee Smith
- Voiced by: Jen Taylor (video game); Tobin Bell (while using Billy the Puppet)

In-universe information
- Full name: Amanda Young
- Origin: Saw (2004)
- Classification: Serial killer
- Association(s): John Kramer (mentor; deceased) Mark Hoffman (fellow apprentice; status unknown)
- M.O.: High-level intelligence Vast resources Highly designed set of symbolic and invariably inescapable death traps, imitating those of the Jigsaw Killer
- Status: Deceased
- Died In: Saw III

Amanda Young is a fictional character created by James Wan and Leigh Whannell and is one of the antagonists in the Saw franchise. She first appeared in Saw (2004), portrayed by Shawnee Smith, as a victim of one of serial killer Jigsaw's traps. Amanda's role was expanded in subsequent films, where she served as an apprentice to Jigsaw, with the goal of succeeding him after his death. Amanda has physically appeared in five of the ten films in the series. The character has gone on to appear in various other media, including video games and comic books.

As an apprentice to Jigsaw, Amanda began placing victims in inescapable traps, as opposed to the traps Jigsaw made, which had the intent of being survivable if certain actions were taken. This places her in an antagonist role within the series. Even as an antagonist, she has become a fan favorite. For her role as the character, Shawnee Smith has received a largely positive reception, leading to her recognition as a "scream queen".

== Fictional character biography ==
=== Saw ===
Amanda in the reverse bear trap

Amanda first appeared as a supporting character in the 2004 film Saw. She was the only known survivor of the Jigsaw Killer (portrayed by Tobin Bell), a man who abducts people he deems unappreciative of their lives and forces them into death traps. Amanda was targeted by Jigsaw because of her past as a drug addict.

Her trap is shown in flashback as it is described to the police and Dr. Lawrence Gordon (portrayed by Cary Elwes) as Dr. Gordon was initially a prime suspect in the case of her trap.

In Amanda's trap, she wakes up with a device attached to her head that is set to rip her jaws apart; the device is described as a "reverse bear trap". The key to unlocking the trap is in the body of her "dead" cellmate, Donnie Greco, who is someone Amanda recognizes from the Homeward Bound Clinic, which is where Amanda stayed to recover from her drug addiction. Amanda prepares to cut Greco for the key, only to find that he is not dead, but heavily sedated. Nevertheless, she uses a scalpel to stab him to death and searches his stomach for the key. Amanda finds the key with only seconds left before the trap would have activated.

Billy the Puppet enters the room with Amanda shortly after she removes the trap, congratulating her on her survival and explaining that she now knows how to appreciate life.

=== Saw II ===
It is revealed in Saw II that Amanda started using heroin in prison. She was sentenced to prison after being framed by Detective Eric Matthews for a crime she did not commit. She appears in most of the film as one of the contestants of a trap set by Jigsaw (John Kramer) involving a house that will flood with nerve gas after a time limit. Also trapped are several other people who Eric had framed, along with the detective's son, Daniel. As the last surviving woman in the nerve gas house, her character seems to fill the role of the film's final girl, but this is a red herring. In a twist ending, it is revealed that Amanda is working with John, seeing him as a father figure and working as his apprentice. Amanda claims that the test she experienced in the first film ultimately saved her life, and this is what caused her to join him. She survives the nerve gas house, saved by Daniel from a violent victim Xavier, and upon the arrival of Eric Matthews she abducts him as her first "test subject" and rescues John from his custody. Amanda expresses vengeful tendencies toward Eric, telling him that the "tables have turned" and that she will make him experience what it is like to be imprisoned, as she traps him in a bathroom to rot. At the end of the film, Amanda claims that she intends to continue John's work after he dies.

=== The Scott Tibbs Documentary ===
Amanda has a brief appearance in the short film The Scott Tibbs Documentary, which is included on the Special Edition DVD of Saw II. In the short film, she is harassed by a news reporter who wants information about her experience when she was captured by Jigsaw, and Amanda responds by punching the reporter in the face and storming off.

=== Saw III ===
Amanda with John

Saw III reveals that Amanda had been working with John since the first film, and that she kidnapped one of the film's protagonists, Adam Stanheight, eventually killing him out of mercy shortly after the events of the film. Flashbacks in Saw III also reveal that Eric had escaped from his trap, and struggled with Amanda over the whereabouts of his son. Amanda managed to overpower him and left Eric to die.

By the third film, Amanda is shown to be ignoring John's modus operandi by creating inescapable traps that kill the subject regardless of whether or not they successfully complete their test. She also shows a tendency to cut herself under stress. The dying John decides to test Amanda to see if she is still stable enough to continue his work by having her work with Dr. Lynn Denlon to keep him alive while she oversees Jeff Denlon's tests. Amanda is aggressive toward Lynn. While John is being operated on, he becomes delirious and professes his love for his ex-wife Jill Tuck, which Amanda mistakes for a professed love for Lynn. Amanda becomes upset and refuses to remove the shotgun collar trap from Lynn, which will kill Lynn if John flatlines. Amanda argues about John's ethics and whether or not Lynn learned anything, revealing that Amanda made her traps inescapable because she felt that the victims would have learned nothing from the test they were put through. Amanda shoots Lynn in the stomach as Jeff walks in. Jeff shoots Amanda in the neck in retaliation. As she dies, a saddened John explains the nature of her test – Lynn and Jeff are actually husband and wife – and expresses his disappointment that she has effectively defeated the purpose of his actions by giving her victims no chance to learn from their tests.

A deleted scene in Saw III shows Amanda killing Eric, by slashing his body several times while on top of him. Darren Lynn Bousman fought to keep this scene in, but the producers removed it because they thought it would be better to leave the door open for Eric's return in Saw IV. Leigh Whannell confirms on the Saw III DVD commentary that Amanda's murder of Eric was the first time she killed out of spite and that it was this incident that caused her to stray from John's intentions.

Two deleted scenes were included on the Saw III Director's Cut DVD. The first was a flashback showing Amanda meeting Adam in his apartment building before kidnapping him for Jigsaw's game. Adam complimented Amanda on her hair, gave her a flyer promoting a friend's concert, and took a picture of her. The second deleted scene was between Amanda and Lynn, in which they had a fight that resulted in cuts on Amanda's arms. It is also noted in Leigh Whannell's Saw III commentary that Amanda's character was abused by her father as a child, although this is never seen in any of the Saw movies.

=== Saw IV ===
During Saw IV, Amanda's ability to carry the much heavier Detective Allison Kerry's unconscious body is questioned by the FBI, leading them to believe that another accomplice is helping John. It is discovered that the events of Saw III and Saw IV occurred at the same time, revealing that Amanda was alive during the events of the fourth film. Her bloody body is found by Agent Peter Strahm in the makeshift operating room just moments after her death.

=== Saw V ===
Amanda reappears in Saw V, but only through flashbacks and voice acting. On August 7, 2008, Shawnee Smith confirmed in an interview with Bloody Disgusting that she had heard that she would indeed be featured in the fifth installment of Saw. However, she claimed that she was never on the set of the fifth film. Smith suggested that her reappearance would most likely be through the use of previously filmed archival footage.

In the fifth film, Hoffman, in a flashback, questions why Amanda would be needed to participate in the nerve gas house trap (from the second movie). Amanda is briefly seen in this flashback, lying unconscious on the floor as John and Hoffman set up this game. In another flashback, in the operating room seen in Saw III, Hoffman questioned John about why he was letting emotional attachment get in the way of his perception of Amanda. Hoffman predicted that she would fail John. He then left the room through a secret exit just before Amanda entered the room with Lynn.

=== Saw VI ===
Amanda in Jill's clinic

In Saw VI, a flashback shows that Amanda, desperate for drugs, sent Cecil to Jill Tuck's clinic to steal some for her, making her an accomplice in the miscarriage of John's son Gideon in Saw IV.

It is also shown that after Amanda survived her test in the first film, John showed Amanda to Jill to prove that his method of rehabilitation was the only one that worked. It is implied that Amanda was once a patient at Jill's clinic and that Jill had given up on her. Amanda told Jill that John's method had helped her.

Amanda appears in a flashback with John and Hoffman as they prepare the trap for Timothy. It is shown that although Amanda and Hoffman were both apprentices of John, they were competitive and reluctant to work together. Amanda expressed doubts about Hoffman's ability to properly set up the mechanics of her devices, noting that she thought he was only useful for "heavy lifting." Hoffman openly expressed his dislike for her, saying that he was the one who truly valued his life. Amanda also questioned whether Hoffman should be tested, reflecting on the fact that she had already passed one test. Amanda's close emotional bond and care for John was also further demonstrated in the film. Amanda seemed awkward and uncomfortable when she and John later ran into Jill as they left the room. It was also revealed that the masked figure who kidnapped Lynn Denlon in Saw III was Amanda.

Another flashback reveals that Hoffman plotted to sabotage Amanda's final exam in Saw III. Knowing of Amanda's involvement in Jill's miscarriage, Hoffman blackmailed Amanda into killing Lynn through the letter he left for her in Saw IV (which she read in Saw III). In the letter, Hoffman told Amanda that he would inform John of Amanda's indirect role in the incident. Feeling pressure not to disappoint her mentor, Amanda followed Hoffman's threats and shot Lynn. This resulted in Amanda's failure to pass the final test John had set for her and her death.

In the director's cut of Saw VI, one of the scenes added was a dialogue between Amanda and Cecil in which she convinces him to rob the clinic by saying, "I've been good to you". Also in the Director's Cut, a scene was added after the credits in which she approaches the room where Corbett Denlon is trapped (during the events of Saw III) and frantically tells her, "Don't trust the one who saves you".

=== Saw 3D ===
At the end of Saw 3D, Amanda appears in a brief archival flashback from Saw II.

=== Jigsaw ===
Although Amanda does not appear in the eighth film, Jigsaw, it is revealed that John was assisted by Logan Nelson in preparing the "reverse bear trap" for the game that she survived in the first film.

=== Saw X ===
Amanda returns in Saw X, a film set before her death in the third installment. In this film, Amanda serves as an active apprentice to Jigsaw, providing support under his guidance as he executes his plans against those who deceived him with a fraudulent cancer treatment.

== In other media ==
=== Comic books ===
==== Saw: Rebirth ====
Amanda Young is featured in the comic book Saw: Rebirth, which takes place before the events of the first movie. It is revealed that John Kramer noticed Amanda while in the hospital being treated for his illness. She is portrayed as a fellow patient in the hospital being treated for an overdose she had suffered due to her drug addiction. John expressed his frustration that Amanda had learned nothing from her overdose. This motivated John to create her test, which was featured in the first movie.

=== Video games ===
==== Saw: The Video Game ====
Amanda appeared in the video game Saw as the first victim that protagonist David Tapp had to save. When she was brought to the asylum, she was held in a poison/antidote injection trap to reflect her intravenous drug use habits. Tapp rushes to rescue her, and she follows him around the asylum. However, she is soon "kidnapped" by Pighead, a henchman wearing Jigsaw's robes to hide Amanda's identity as Jigsaw's apprentice.

==== Dead by Daylight ====
Amanda was added as a downloadable playable killer for Dead by Daylight in January 2018, utilizing a hidden blade and the reverse bear trap as weapons. After her death in Saw III, she is revived and transported to the universe of Dead by Daylight by a supernatural force known as "The Entity".

== Characterization ==
Several of the film crew behind the Saw film series have commented on how Amanda's character is a focus point of the franchise. Marcus Dunstan, writer of Saw IV, Saw V, Saw VI, and Saw 3D stated that "Shawnee Smith's character [Amanda] represents a tremendous viable, emotional thread throughout the narratives." Fellow writer of Saw IV, Saw V, Saw VI, and Saw 3D Patrick Melton further stated that "I don't think we could have effectively told the story of Hoffman and John Kramer without including Amanda." Kevin Greutert, the editor of Saw, Saw II, Saw III, and Saw IV, and director of Saw VI and Saw 3D, further stated that "[Smith] did a great job, and [Amanda's] such a peculiar aspect of the Jigsaw character, with the fact that he had these tender feelings for this weirdo."

Actress Shawnee Smith said that while she did not personally fully identify with Amanda, she found many of Amanda's traits to be admirable. Smith stated: "When you first meet [Amanda], she's at the bottom, she can't go any lower and it's the combination of that and having nothing left to lose and finding someone to love and to sacrifice for. Obviously she's tragic, but 95% of her was capable of growing the strength to serve and sacrifice for another human being. Now that's rare and it takes strength, courage, practice, diligence, and a fearlessness to build that."

Smith also stated that she attempted to find the human being in Amanda, and tried not to merely turn her into a "super killer". Smith remarked of Amanda's relationship with Jigsaw that it was not so much an apprentice relationship, but that she perceived it as "a true friendship and a real partnership".

Through interviews with Shawnee Smith, it was revealed that Amanda's evolution into the killer she was at the end of Saw III was in part due to a horrible childhood. Smith stated on numerous occasions that Amanda was severely abused and neglected when she was a child. This was confirmed by Saw series writer, actor, and co-creator Leigh Whannell, who also commented on Amanda's past in a commentary for Saw III. In the original script of Saw III, dialogue between John and Amanda made references to her past; in a scene describing her view of the bathroom trap she explains to John that "When I was a little girl, my father would lock me under the stairs. I was terrified of the dark, and he would leave me in there alone. For hours."

Leigh Whannell describes in the Saw III DVD commentary that because of her childhood, Amanda had never properly learned to deal with stress and emotional pain, and thus turned to self-harm as a way of dealing with her problems. While in prison, her abusive tendencies were replaced with heroin use. However, after surviving the "reverse bear trap", she no longer used heroin and returned to cutting, burning, and other forms of self-injury. Her frail emotional state and somewhat mental instability made her quick to anger, and she would often act purely on impulse or emotion (such as trying to kill Eric Matthews, and her emotionally and physically abusive behaviour towards Lynn Denlon).

A scene in Saw III explores Amanda's self-injuring tendencies, and shows her cutting the inside of her thigh. The scene was not in the original script, and instead there was a brief scene in which Amanda is shown squeezing a razor blade (which was later replaced by a scene of Amanda squeezing a leather cutter), only hinting at Amanda self-injuring. Prior to filming, Smith had been reading A Bright Red Scream, a book that explains the reasons one would turn to self-injury. It was Smith who insisted that a self-injury scene be filmed and put into the film, believing it was necessary to show Amanda's tendencies for character depth.

Amanda displayed indications of guilt and remorse in her actions, as she had a nightmare of one of her victims in a deleted scene in the director's cut of Saw III. In her dream she was confronted by Adam for what she had done to him, thus further revealing the emotional turmoil that her character exhibited.

Jake Huntley wrote of the complexity of Amanda's character in the Irish Journal of Gothic and Horror Studies. Huntley noted that although Amanda sets herself as notably different from the Jigsaw Killer, her attachment toward him and her desire to be like him are central to her character's state of mind. Huntley stated that:

The difficulty Amanda has in locating herself within the symbolic order is evident in the dénouement of Saw III. In a flashback scene she commits a mercy killing of Adam and is then attacked by the maimed Eric Matthews. Her face running with blood from their fight (reminiscent of Jigsaw's blood mask as he lies prone throughout Saw I), Amanda walks away from the injured detective until he begins shouting after her that she's "nothing" and "you're not Jigsaw." These taunts are what provoke a response. In the present of Saw III Amanda confronts Lynn and Jigsaw whilst brandishing a gun, angry and jealous over Jigsaw's apparent fondness for the physician, demanding to know why Lynn is so important to him, complaining that Lynn is "nothing" and "worthless" and crying that she (Amanda) doesn't mean anything to Jigsaw. "Nothing", "not Jigsaw" and "not important" become the signification closing in around Amanda – yet her demand "Fix me, motherfucker," is a mimicking of Jigsaw's continual ambiguity of speech as it carries the implication of her past drug addiction before she knew Jigsaw. Even at such a critical moment, jostling a gun between the terrified Lynn and the terminal Jigsaw, Amanda's desire to identify with her mentor remains.

Huntley further points out that the biggest dilemma that Amanda's character faced is that she lost her sense of "self" following her "reverse bear trap" in the first film. This is characterised by her claim to have been "reborn", symbolising her neurotic desire to be somebody else other than herself. The viewer is confronted with a character who grapples with trying to understand her own identity as she simultaneously attempts to emulate Jigsaw's characteristics, while also setting herself apart as different from him. Huntley claims this predicament that caused Amanda's gradual emotional breakdown. Huntley stated that:

What seems to be consistent thematically through the Saw films is that 'Jigsaw' is a part for various players, an identity composed of pieces and despite John's preparations and Amanda's willingness it is a puzzle into which Amanda is, simply, unable to fit. Her addiction to drugs and her self-harming are 'helped' via the games she plays by something that proves to be far more pernicious, as Jigsaw comes to stand not as the object of her desire but the cause. Far from achieving a sense of self, status and stability through her role as Jigsaw's disciple, Amanda is not 'reborn' and ultimately loses her sense of identity. Amanda is reduced to nothing or, as Matthews accurately and devastatingly phrases it, "not Jigsaw." Amanda Young grows out of her original place of signification and cannot occupy the space she desires, nor can she regress to fit herself back into the position of the signifier "Amanda". The inevitable pressure of this untenable negativity is what causes Amanda's dissolution. Unable to express her desire for Jigsaw, unable to be Jigsaw and ultimately unable to be, she is squeezed out of any position within the symbolic order and caught in a horror of a hollow point of signification – which is the subtlest trap of all.

Kyle Turner writing for Slant commenting on Amanda's role in Saw X, stated "She's all id, a tempest of emotion and fully embodied desperation and psychosis."

== Symbolic representations ==
=== Emulation of Jigsaw's icons ===
After becoming one of John's apprentices, Amanda often took on many of John's iconic symbols. For instance, she often wore a pig mask when capturing her victims. Also, in Saw III, she appeared wearing John's iconic red and black theatrical robe. Huntley analysed this as an attempt by Amanda to be "dressed as Jigsaw".

Huntley further stated that: "For Amanda, Jigsaw as signifier can only ever stand in the place of a vexatious and frustrating lack and it is this which locates Amanda in such a conflicted position – having given 'every cell' of herself to Jigsaw, she is only able to act in an imitative and repetitive way, a second, or understudy, in danger of being only slightly more useful than the Billy doll, waiting both for and against Jigsaw's inevitable and impending death."

=== Inescapable traps ===
Amanda eventually developed her own unique modus operandi, in which the traps she set were inescapable, and would kill the test subjects even when the victims had achieved the goals of their games. While John always refused to acknowledge his traps as murder, Amanda openly admitted that her actions did define her as a murderer. She chose to execute her subjects because she did not believe anyone would change, including herself.

Huntley pointed out that Amanda's traps are used as a creative tool of juxtaposition with that of Jigsaw's, to effectively point out what the Jigsaw killer was not. Huntley outlined this, stating that: "If Jigsaw's games are encounters with Deleuzian affect, Amanda's games are anti-deleuzian, operating more as encounters with Lacanian notions of the signification of death within the symbolic order and the death drive. This is because Amanda, as a Lacanian subject, becomes caught between her own subjectivity and the object of her desire. In purely cinematic terms, Jigsaw directs his games while Amanda acts in hers... The subjects of Amanda's games, undertaken for Jigsaw, constitute only the throwing away, the discarding... At the most basic level, Amanda does not allow chance or potential to interfere, only ever seeing Jigsaw's games as constitutive of the symbolic order, as an elaborate cover for staging the death of those who lack the survival instinct and thus do not deserve life."

== Reception ==
In a list compiled by Scott Collura for IGN of the top fifty villainesses in modern popular culture, entitled "Top 50 Chicks Behaving Badly", Amanda Young was ranked as number 42. Collura remarked that Amanda was so villainous that she made "a killer like Jigsaw look like the good guy..." On Tom Cullen's list of the top five most noteworthy fictional female serial killers, as featured on Asylum, Amanda Young was ranked as number four. In a list that included Sharon Stone's iconic Catherine Tramell, Cullen remarked that of all those featured on his list, Smith's Amanda would be the "most in need of psychiatric help". Don Summer, a writer for Best-Horror-films.com, commented that Shawnee Smith did a "fantastic job" in her recurring role as Jigsaw's "trusty sidekick", Amanda. Shawnee Smith has been acknowledged as a "scream queen" due to the roles she has played in horror films, which includes her role as Amanda in the Saw films. This culminated in the selection of Smith as a judge and host for the reality series Scream Queens, in which contestants competed for a role in Saw VI.

Tobin Bell and Shawnee Smith were nominated for the Spike Scream Award in the category of "Most Vile Villain" for their portrayals of John and Amanda respectively in Saw III.

Smith's depiction of Amanda in the reverse bear trap was used in promotional posters for the first film. The same image also appears on the soundtrack for the first film. A depiction of Amanda in this device was released as a collectable statue by Hollywood Collectables, indicating the iconic status that the character has obtained.

Reviewing Saw X, Alison Foreman of IndieWire writes that Smith's "pitch-perfect performance – self-aware, soapy, and rivaling Chris Rock for funniest in the series – is still stunningly effective." Siddhant Adlakha observes that Smith returns for "a surprisingly sizable role that, like Bell, allows the actress to tie a neat bow on a character who may have been killed off far too quickly." Jack McCarthy cited Smith as giving the best of the film's "outstanding performances", and Joshua Rothkopf opines that Bell's "half-cracked grandeur, boosted by Smith's skewed stares of adoration, sends the film into a loopy giddiness." Alternatively, Casey Drury called Smith's acting and line delivery "exponentially shallow". Some commentators also noted that Bell and Smith had noticeably aged since last playing their characters in films set after the prequel.
