= Pig mask =

Pig mask may refer to:

- One of the Jigsaw Killer's disguises used in the Saw (series).
- A soldier in the Pigmask Army, the primary antagonists of Mother 3.
