= Mark Hoffman =

Fictional character from the Saw franchise

- Saw character
- Costas Mandylor as Mark Hoffman in Saw IV (2007)
- First appearance: Saw III (2006)
- Last appearance: Saw X (2023)
- Created by: James Wan; Leigh Whannell
- Portrayed by: Costas Mandylor
- Voiced by: Tobin Bell (while using Billy the Puppet)

In-universe information
- Full name: Mark Hoffman
- Occupation: Detective (formerly); Detective lieutenant (formerly)
- Relatives: Angelina (sister; deceased)
- Origin: Saw III (2006)
- Classification: Serial killer
- Association(s): John Kramer (mentor; deceased) Amanda Young (fellow apprentice; deceased) Lawrence Gordon (fellow apprentice; alive)
- M.O.: High-level intelligence Vast resources Highly designed set of symbolic death traps, imitating those of the Jigsaw Killer
- Status: Unknown

Detective Lieutenant Mark Hoffman is a fictional character and the secondary antagonist of the Saw franchise. He is portrayed by Australian actor Costas Mandylor. While the character was first shown briefly as a police officer in Saw III, later films in the series have expanded his role and revealed him to be an apprentice, and subsequently the successor of the Jigsaw Killer, as the new Jigsaw. The character serves as the secondary antagonist in Saw IV, and the main antagonist in Saw V, VI and 3D. He also has a brief vocal cameo and physically appears in the mid-credits scene of Saw X, setting up a new trap alongside Jigsaw.

Like his mentor and partner, Hoffman designs death traps that, for survivors, give them reason to appreciate their lives. Unlike his mentor, however, he has no emotion towards his victims and generally displays a very monotone personality. He also enjoys making his victims suffer, and frequently places his victims in traps where at least one must be killed for the other(s) to escape, and has on occasion placed them in inescapable traps.

His surname is a tribute to producer Gregg Hoffman, who died on December 4, 2005, just five weeks after the release of Saw II.

== Fictional character biography ==
=== Saw III ===
Saw III briefly shows Hoffman during the investigation of Troy's chain trap. Hoffman is shown to be listening in on Officer Daniel Rigg's conversation with Detective Allison Kerry about Jigsaw's ability to continue his work. Unnoticed by the others, Hoffman pockets a chain fragment from the trap's aftermath and Kerry comments as to why the door had to be cut open by the police to secure the crime scene. He appears very apathetic and glib while speaking to Rigg and Kerry. Rigg shows that this bothered him. As seen in Saw IV, Amanda and Hoffman then place Kerry in a trap which kills her even though she did as she was instructed, revealing that the trap was rigged to be inescapable.

During flashbacks in Saw VI, as they begin to put John's final tests into action, Hoffman and Amanda begin fighting over John's affections and legacy. Hoffman tries to win John's favor by warning him against Amanda's now murderous take on his legacy. John instead chooses to allow the game to progress. Hoffman, knowing the test portrayed in Saw III was actually meant for Amanda, proceeds to sabotage the test by switching John's letter for Amanda with one of his own: a letter informing her that if she does not kill Lynn Denlon, he will tell John she was the person that sent Cecil to steal drugs, which ultimately resulted in Jill Tuck's miscarriage when Cecil slammed a door on her. Amanda does so, but is killed by Lynn's husband, Jeff Denlon, who then proceeds to kill John as well.

=== Saw IV ===
Hoffman listening to the tape found in Jigsaw's stomach after his autopsy

In the opening scene of Saw IV, Hoffman is called to the police morgue to hear a cassette tape that is found in Jigsaw's stomach during his autopsy. It is later revealed that the events of Saw III and Saw IV occurred at the same time, so this scene actually happened after the events of those two films.

Prior, Hoffman knocks out Rigg and makes it seem that Detective Eric Matthews and himself have been captured by Jigsaw, and that Rigg must save them both. Rigg completes a series of tests, leading him to Jigsaw's lair and the location of Hoffman and Eric's trap. Despite previous warnings to not go through unsecured doors, Rigg enters the room of their trap before the timer expires, causing Eric's death and apparently killing Hoffman as well. However, Hoffman releases himself from his bonds, having never been in any danger, and reveals himself as Jigsaw's accomplice. Hoffman leaves Rigg to die and walks out of the room. The morgue scene replays with a more detailed message to Hoffman stating that Jigsaw's work is not over and that Hoffman will not go untested.

=== Saw V ===
Hoffman has a more significant role in Saw V. After FBI agent Peter Strahm enters Jigsaw's sickroom following the events of Saw III and Saw IV, Hoffman comes in from the scene of Rigg's final test and locks Strahm in. Strahm finds a hidden back door leading into a passage, where a microcassette warns not to proceed any further. Ignoring this message, Strahm moves down the passage, where Hoffman captures him and places him into a trap intended to kill him by drowning. Much to Hoffman's bewilderment, Strahm escapes his trap and is carried away on a gurney, while Hoffman makes himself out to be a hero, taking credit for the rescue of Corbett Denlon and ending the Jigsaw murders.

It is revealed that Hoffman was the one who set up Seth Baxter's inescapable trap, in which Seth was bisected by a swinging pendulum blade, in retaliation for the murder of Hoffman's sister; Hoffman made it look like a Jigsaw trap. Jigsaw subsequently kidnapped Hoffman, accusing him of blaming Jigsaw for something he had done, and blackmailed Hoffman into becoming his apprentice; he subsequently helped John find victims and set up several of the games seen in the previous two films.

Strahm begins to pursue Hoffman as a five-person trap set up by the latter plays out. Hoffman plants evidence to frame Strahm as the last Jigsaw apprentice. This deception eventually leads Strahm's superior, FBI agent Dan Erickson, to put out an all-points bulletin for Strahm's immediate arrest for the Jigsaw murders.

Meanwhile, Strahm trails Hoffman to a dark basement with the hopes of finding him there. Strahm instead finds a glass box with a cassette tape from Hoffman. The tape states that Strahm will need to trust him and get into the box (filled with broken glass) if he wants to live. Strahm chooses not to heed the warning and instead throws Hoffman into the box, which safely lowers Hoffman down into the floor while the walls slide together, crushing Strahm to death. Hoffman is left as the hero from the Jigsaw murders, and Strahm (still believed to be alive by the world at large) is considered a suspect as Jigsaw's second apprentice.

=== Saw VI ===
In Saw VI, Hoffman traps a health insurer, William Easton, who denied a man's claim for medical help, leading to his death. It is later revealed that William had rejected John Kramer's insurance claim in relation to his cancer treatment, and that this is part of a wider game in which Jigsaw wants Hoffman to collaborate with Jill. Displeased, Hoffman visits Jill and tells her he will do it alone, demanding the information she was given about the targets for the trap. Jill gives Hoffman five envelopes that Jigsaw had given her for the next game.

FBI agent Lindsey Perez, thought to have died in Saw IV, is revealed to be alive. She figures out that Hoffman is Jigsaw's real apprentice, not Strahm. The key evidence is an audio lab analysis (with Hoffman present) of the tape from Seth Baxter's trap, which proves to contain Hoffman's disguised voice. Hoffman attacks Erickson and Perez, uses the technician as a shield against Perez's gunshots, and demands who else knows about him. Perez says, "Everyone," before Hoffman finally kills her. He then sets the audio lab on fire to destroy the evidence and finish off the three victims, planting Strahm's fingerprints around the room to keep suspicion from himself.

The contents of Amanda's letter (as seen in Saw III and IV) are shown in a flashback, which explains that Hoffman had discovered that when Cecil robbed Jill's clinic for drugs, he was not acting alone. Amanda, visibly going through withdrawals and desperate for another high, pressured Cecil into doing so, she inadvertently caused Jill to miscarry her and John's unborn child, Gideon. In the letter, Hoffman blackmailed Amanda into killing Lynn, telling her that if she failed to do so, he would reveal her involvement in Jill's miscarriage to John.

One of John's last requests to Jill is to test Hoffman, from one of the envelopes containing Hoffman's photograph. Jill stuns him, straps him into a chair, and puts him in an updated version of the reverse bear trap but does not leave a key for him to free himself. To escape, Hoffman slams his head down onto his left hand, breaking it so that he can slip it out of the strap. He tries unsuccessfully to open the lock with a screw driver, then throws his head through a barred window on the door; when the timer runs out, the device becomes jammed in the bars failing to open fully. He then pulls his head free, surviving the trap with a major wound on his cheek.

=== Saw 3D ===
In Saw 3D, after escaping the upgraded reverse bear trap, Hoffman leaves, taking medical supplies, and returns to his hideout where he stitches his cheek and bandages his hand. Jill meets with Matt Gibson, an Internal Affairs detective at Hoffman's precinct, and tells him that Hoffman has been involved as an accomplice in nearly every Jigsaw murder. The police attempt to raid the area where Hoffman is, but he hides himself in a body bag and is rolled into the coroner's office. After escaping from there, he goes on a killing spree at the police station. He then finds Jill and puts her in the original reverse bear trap while she is strapped to a chair. With no means for Jill to escape, the trap springs open and kills her. While a news broadcast is heard reporting that Jill has been found dead and that Hoffman is now wanted by the authorities, Hoffman destroys his hideout and prepares to flee the city, but is attacked by three people wearing pig masks. One of the men is revealed to be Dr. Lawrence Gordon, who survived the amputation of his own foot by cauterizing his stump using a hot steam pipe; he was later nursed back to health by John, who subsequently recruited him as an apprentice. Lawrence takes Hoffman into the bathroom from the first film, chains him by the ankle to the pipes, and throws away the hacksaw he used to cut off his own foot before he can do the same. Lawrence then shuts off the lights and leaves, closing the door and leaving Hoffman to presumably die.

=== Saw X ===
After John is conned into a fake cancer treatment sometime between the events of the first two films, he tasks Hoffman to obtain the information about those who scammed him. In the film's mid-credits scene, Hoffman stands alongside Jigsaw in the bathroom from the first film, assisting him in the test for Henry Kessler, who lured John into the scheme in the first place.

== Characterization ==
Prior to the release of Saw VI, actor Costas Mandylor stated of his character, "Hoffman is sort of torn of becoming a mad man or becoming a guy that's more composed, coming from a pure place like Jigsaw. That's my character's dilemma; does he go fucking crazy or follow the rules of the boss?" Costas also mentioned that, when compared to Jigsaw and his morals, the rough edges of Hoffman are really shown.
