= Eric Matthews (Saw) =

Fictional character from the Saw franchise

- Saw character
- Donnie Wahlberg as Eric Matthews in Saw III (2006)
- First appearance: Full Disclosure Report: Piecing Together Jigsaw (2005)
- Last appearance: Saw V (2008)
- Created by: Leigh Whannell; Darren Lynn Bousman
- Portrayed by: Donnie Wahlberg

In-universe information
- Occupation: Police detective
- Spouse: Unknown Female
- Significant other: Allison Kerry (ex-girlfriend)
- Children: Daniel Matthews (son)
- Status: Deceased

Detective Eric Matthews is a fictional character from the Saw franchise. Portrayed by Donnie Wahlberg, he first appeared in a mockumentary entitled Full Disclosure Report: Piecing Together Jigsaw, featured on the uncut version of the original film. He subsequently appeared as the protagonist of Saw II (2005), and had a minor role in Saw III (2006), and again a major role in Saw IV (2007). Eric's final appearance was in the form of a photograph in Saw V (2008). Before the release of Saw III, it was stated that Wahlberg would not return as the character, but this turned out to be a hoax conceived by Lionsgate Entertainment to throw off fans of the series trying to dig up details on the film.

In the films, Eric is depicted as a corrupt police detective, who uses excessive brutality and framed several innocent people. He is one of the many people trying to solve the case of the Jigsaw Killer, and becomes directly involved when his son Daniel is among those forced to participate in one of Jigsaw's "games". Eric's patience is tested by Jigsaw, who forces him to wait until he reveals Daniel's whereabouts. Eric ultimately fails his test and brutalizes Jigsaw, forcing him to take him to the location of the game, only to end up captured. After six months in captivity, Eric becomes part of a game designed for his colleague, Officer Daniel Rigg; Rigg fails his test, resulting in Eric being killed by one of Jigsaw's contraptions.

== Appearances ==
=== Saw - Full Disclosure Report ===
Eric's first appearance is in the in-universe documentary titled "Full Disclosure Report" which is featured on the Saw: Uncut DVD. A reporter states that Eric's excessive force and bad temper might be one factor that is holding police back from solving the Jigsaw case. A clip of Eric entering his car is shown as a reporter asks Eric for some information on the case, also asking about the reports of Eric's brutality. Eric responds by pulling out his gun and yelling, "What brutality?". A fellow officer then pulls Eric back to his car.

=== Saw II ===
Eric's first major appearance is in Saw II, where he is introduced as the father of Daniel Matthews, and as a detective assigned to desk work who is being investigated by the department's internal affairs office. He is called to the scene of one of the Jigsaw Killer's recently discovered games, where Eric is asked by his ex-partner, Detective Allison Kerry, to identify the victim, who turns out to be Michael Marks, a police informant used by Eric. While leaving the scene, Kerry points out a message written on the ceiling, which stated, "Look closer Detective Matthews." Annoyed with Kerry for bringing him to the scene to be goaded into the investigation by the message, Eric announces that he has enough work to do, while having to deal with his wife's divorce lawyers.

Later, while trying to sleep, Eric remembers the brand name of a padlock used on the device that killed Michael. With this information, he decides to tag along with Kerry and SWAT Commander Daniel Rigg to an old warehouse that they believe to be Jigsaw's latest lair. Finally coming face to face with Jigsaw inside, Eric is put into a test. Eric is told that he has a problem to deal with, and uncovers numerous computer monitors that display a camera feed that shows his son, along with seven others, being held captive in a house. Confronting Jigsaw, Eric is told that Daniel is in danger of the nerve gas that is being pumped into the house, but that if Eric sits and has a conversation with Jigsaw for long enough, he will get his son back. Eric, under advice from Kerry, reluctantly sits and begins his test.

During his conversations with Jigsaw, it is revealed that Eric had once been a ruthless and brutal police officer who used extreme measures to complete his assignments, going so far as to plant evidence on suspects and shoot down unarmed suspects. However, Jigsaw seems to state that Eric at least felt alive during those times, but is now cowering behind a desk. Eric eventually leaves the conversation with Jigsaw to watch his son's progression through the house with the seven strangers, only being convinced by Kerry, who is revealed to at one point to have been Eric's mistress, to threaten Jigsaw's work as a way to find his son's location. When that does nothing, Jigsaw reveals that the seven strangers in the house with Daniel are in fact seven ex-convicts who had been arrested by Eric after being framed with false evidence. Eric, under Rigg's advice, begins to aggressively attack Jigsaw, punching and kicking him repeatedly and breaking his finger in order to find out where his son is being held. Jigsaw states that Eric's game is over, and that he will take Eric to the house.

Together, they escape from the building without Eric's team, and drive away in a van. Jigsaw gives Eric directions to the house along the way. Leaving Jigsaw in the van, Eric goes through the back door of the house, and finds the corpses inside in a state of decay, as if having been there for an extended period of time. He manages to get into the foundation of the house, where he stumbles across the bathroom from the first film, where his son has already been to. Expecting to find Daniel there, Eric is attacked by Amanda Young, dressed in a pig mask, and rendered unconscious. It is revealed that the feed of the house that Eric had seen was not in fact live, but had been a recording. Daniel had been locked in a safe that had sat a few feet away from Jigsaw during Eric's test. When Eric wakes up, he is shackled by the ankle to a pipe in the bathroom with his gun unloaded and his flashlight out of reach. Amanda reveals herself to be Jigsaw's apprentice before sliding the door shut, leaving Eric to die.

=== Saw III ===
Eric manages to free himself from his shackle in Saw III, mere minutes after having been locked away, by smashing and breaking his foot to the point that it could slip through. Flashbacks later in the film show him escaping the bathroom. Limping through the basement hallways, screaming for his son, Eric quickly passes Amanda, who hides herself and begins panicking. Eric attacks Amanda and severely beats her with ease, despite his injuries. When he demands to know where Daniel is, Amanda spits in Eric's face and kicks his broken foot, then begins to walk away. Eric taunts her, saying, "You're not Jigsaw, bitch!", which prompts her to turn back toward him. It is unknown what she does next, but she seems to believe that Eric is dead as she tells Jigsaw that she "returned the favor" for him taking her life from her. Jigsaw corrects her, saying that he had cleaned up her mistakes.

He is also spoken of by Kerry during the film, describing the guilt that she felt after his disappearance and having hallucinations of him.

=== Saw IV ===
Eric in Saw IV

It is revealed in Saw IV (which takes place concurrently with Saw III) that Eric has been missing for six months. As Daniel Rigg begins his own series of tests, he learns that Eric is still alive. Flashbacks show that after he taunted Amanda, she did not kill Eric and instead beat him unconscious out of anger. He was dragged into a cell by another man, where he was imprisoned until the time came for Rigg's tests. During this time, he was supplied with food and a heavy iron brace for his crushed foot. He and Detective Mark Hoffman (the man who imprisoned him) are at opposite ends of a seesaw scale; Eric stands on a slowly melting block of ice with a chain-noose around his neck, while Hoffman is strapped into a chair with an electrode by his feet. If Eric slips off the ice, he will be hanged and the runoff water will tip to Hoffman's end and electrocute him. Tired of being used as a pawn, Eric is ready to give up, saying "I don't want to play anymore" and twice attempting suicide by jumping off the block.

These attempts are thwarted by Art, another man in the test who is forced to watch over Eric and Hoffman. Once the 90-minute timer for Rigg's tests has run out, Art will be able to release them and himself. Eric realizes that if the door is opened ahead of time, two large ice blocks will swing down from the ceiling and crush his head. Art gives him a gun and one bullet with which to stop anyone from coming in. As Rigg approaches the door, Eric shoots out through it and hits him in the stomach. Rigg enters the room with one second to spare, releasing the ice blocks, which crush Eric's head, killing him.

=== Saw V ===
Eric's picture is on display at a memorial for the officers who have died during the Jigsaw case.

=== Removed and altered content ===
Eric had originally been written to be killed by Amanda in Saw III after she marched back towards him after his taunts. In the original script, Amanda stabbed and slashed Eric repeatedly in the neck, killing him. According to the Saw III DVD commentaries, this scene was filmed but removed against the director's will from the movie, so that Eric could be kept alive for Saw IV, since the other main characters of the franchise were killed off.

== Characterization ==
During an interview, Donnie Wahlberg offered his opinion of Eric:

I think he's a selfish person. He's the type of person who's incapable of concerning himself with other people's feelings including his son's. In his mind, he probably has bigger issues. As we discover, he's not the most ethical person in the world. It all makes sense if you think about the first movie and what Jigsaw's mode is; what his MO is. This is a guy who doesn't really care anymore and he's kinda mailing it in. It's no mistake that he's brought into this case. It's by design and I think Jigsaw probably knew that this guy wouldn't want to get involved in the case and that's why he singled him out. When his name is on the ceiling, he's basically saying, "You are going to be my next subject." If my character was a little less selfish and a little less self-absorbed wasn't in a world of self-loathing, he might have been smart enough to realize that he was being pulled into something. That's sort of like life. We are at time so worried about ourselves we miss other stuff; and if you get carried away with that like my character does, it could really get you. In most cases and in real life, we figure it out before it's too late.

In the same interview, Wahlberg commented on the appeal of playing this character:

He didn't care about himself. I hope that audience would get that he cares about his son, but that doesn't mean I expected the audience to have sympathy for him. If they believe that he knows he made a mistake, that's good enough. I didn't want the audiences to say, "What an asshole!" I don't know if women in the audience care about Cary Elwes from the first Saw film. I think they still thought he was a bastard even if he didn't sleep with that woman. His mistake put him in that predicament and in real, if you mess around on your wife, you're probably not to going to end up chained up in the bathroom somewhere with a saw, but you can still make a mess out of things. What I kept zeroing in on with my character and his son is when I talk to my son, I tell him I love him every time I hang up the phone. I say, "I love you," when I drop him off at school, only because I want to make sure that the last things I say to him is something wonderful. That's one of the things we added to the script. That was one of the best moments for my character, to see what was the last thing he said to his son. When Jigsaw asks him that, that was something I had to have in that scene. If you are a parent, you will probably say to yourself, "That's not good." That's the thing that you have to live with.
