= Saw IV =

2007 film by Darren Lynn Bousman

- Theatrical release poster
- Directed by: Darren Lynn Bousman
- Screenplay by: Patrick Melton; Marcus Dunstan
- Story by: Patrick Melton; Marcus Dunstan; Thomas Fenton
- Produced by: Gregg Hoffman (Note: Although Hoffman died in 2005, he had received posthumous producer credit in films produced by Twisted Pictures starting with Saw III (2006).); Oren Koules; Mark Burg
- Starring: Tobin Bell; Scott Patterson; Costas Mandylor; Betsy Russell; Lyriq Bent
- Cinematography: David A. Armstrong
- Edited by: Kevin Greutert; Brett Sullivan
- Music by: Charlie Clouser
- Production company: Twisted Pictures
- Distributed by: Lionsgate Films
- Release date: October 25, 2007; (Australia)
- Running time: 92 minutes
- Country: United States
- Language: English
- Budget: $10 million
- Box office: $139.4 million

Saw IV is a 2007 American horror film directed by Darren Lynn Bousman from a screenplay by Patrick Melton and Marcus Dunstan, and a story by Melton, Dunstan, and Thomas Fenton. A sequel to Saw III (2006) and the fourth installment in the Saw film series, it stars Tobin Bell, Scott Patterson, Costas Mandylor, Betsy Russell, and Lyriq Bent.

The film picks up where the previous film left off, with the death of John Kramer. However, it is revealed that John had planned for his death and left behind a series of recordings and clues that would lead investigators to his final game. As the detectives try to unravel the mystery of John's final game, they are drawn into a web of deceit that reveals more of the motives behind his lethal games.

Saw IV was the first film in the franchise to not be written by Leigh Whannell or James Wan. It was released by Lionsgate Films in the United States on October 26, 2007. It received mostly negative reviews from critics and grossed $139 million worldwide. A sequel, Saw V, was released in 2008.

== Plot ==
An autopsy of the Jigsaw Killer reveals a wax-coated microcassette in his stomach. Detective Mark Hoffman is called in to listen to it. The tape promises him that "the games have just begun." In a mausoleum, a man named Trevor and lawyer Art Blank are chained to a large device. Trevor's eyes and Art's mouth have been sewn shut, making communication between them impossible. When the device begins pulling them together, they panic, and Art eventually kills Trevor to retrieve a key from his collar.

Meanwhile, the police discover the remains of Detective Allison Kerry. (Note: As depicted in Saw III) Hoffman cautions Officer Daniel Rigg for barging through an unsecured door in attempt to save Kerry. Hoffman is introduced to FBI Agents Peter Strahm and Lindsey Perez, who deduce that Amanda, Jigsaw's apprentice, would have needed assistance with Kerry's death, indicating that there is another apprentice.

That evening, Rigg and Hoffman are kidnapped. Rigg is told that Detective Eric Matthews is in fact still alive, and is given ninety minutes to save himself. He is then given his first test, where he finds sex trafficker Brenda strapped to a device that scalps her. He rescues her, despite being warned not to, and Brenda later attempts to stab Rigg; Rigg subdues her and learns that Brenda was told that Rigg was there to arrest her for her crimes.

Strahm interrogates Jill Tuck, Jigsaw's ex-wife. Jill reveals that she was once pregnant with a boy named Gideon but suffered a miscarriage when drug addict Cecil robbed the clinic at which she was employed and accidentally slammed a door into her stomach.

Rigg's next test is at a motel, where he is instructed to abduct the manager, Ivan Landsness, revealed to be a serial rapist. Angered by seeing videos of Ivan's exploits, Rigg forces Ivan into a prearranged trap which forces him to gouge out his eyes; he fails to do it in time and the trap dismembers him. Rigg's next test occurs in a school where Rigg attacked Rex, a man acquitted of abusing his family, though Rigg's career was saved by Hoffman. In one of the classrooms, Rigg discovers Rex and his wife, Morgan, chained back to back with a spike impaled through their bodies. Morgan has removed every spike but one, killing Rex and leaving herself barely alive. Rigg removes the final spike and gives Morgan the key to free herself from her restraints, then pulls a fire alarm and leaves.

Strahm and Perez arrive on the scene, where it is learned that all of the victims were defended by Art, who is also Jill's lawyer. After a photographer is accidentally killed on the scene, Perez finds Billy, Jigsaw's puppet, in the office. She is told that Strahm will "soon take the life of an innocent man" and that Perez's "next step is critical". Ignoring past clues that she is in danger, Perez leans toward Billy and is critically injured by shrapnel when its face explodes. She is rushed to the hospital.

After learning that he had terminal cancer, and after a suicide attempt, Jigsaw placed Cecil in his first trap. After Cecil got out when the trap broke, he lunged at Jigsaw to attack him but fell to his death in a mesh of razor wire. Strahm makes connections from Jill's story to the Gideon Meat Factory, the scene of Rigg's final test.

Strahm arrives but finds himself lost, accidentally trailing Jeff Denlon. Meanwhile, Rigg approaches his final test. In the next room are Art, Eric, and Hoffman; it was revealed earlier that if the door was opened before Rigg's timer expired, Eric's head would be crushed between two ice blocks and Hoffman would be electrocuted by a complex device. Rigg charges through the door with one second to spare. Despite Eric's attempts to stop Rigg by shooting him, he is killed. Rigg shoots Art while, in another room, Strahm encounters Jeff, who brandishes a gun. Strahm, who is unaware that Jeff is frantically searching for his daughter, kills him. Hoffman, who was never in any danger and is revealed to be Jigsaw's other apprentice, rises and seals a dying Rigg and a bewildered Strahm in the factory.

These games are revealed to have taken place before Jigsaw's autopsy. Hoffman is warned via the microcassette that he can expect to face a test of his own.

== Cast ==
- Tobin Bell as Jigsaw / John Kramer
- Costas Mandylor as Detective Hoffman
- Scott Patterson as Agent Strahm
- Betsy Russell as Jill
- Lyriq Bent as Rigg
- Athena Karkanis as Agent Perez
- Justin Louis as Art
- Donnie Wahlberg as Eric Matthews
- Angus Macfadyen as Jeff
- Bahar Soomekh as Lynn
- Dina Meyer as Kerry
- Mike Realba as Fisk
- Marty Adams as Ivan
- Sarain Boylan as Brenda
- Billy Otis as Cecil
- James Van Patten as Dr. Heffner
- Kevin Rushton as Trevor
- Julian Richings as a vagrant
- Kelly Jones as SWAT Pete
- Ingrid Hart as Tracy
- Niamh Wilson as Corbett
- Janet Land as Morgan
- Ron Lea as Rex
- Devon Bostick as Derek
- Tony Nappo as Gus
- Emmanuelle Vaugier as Addison
- Noam Jenkins as Michael
- Mike Butters as Paul
- J. Larose as Troy
- Oren Koules as The Man

== Production ==
In January 2007, Saw writer James Wan stated that a script was in development. Leigh Whannell told Fangoria that he and Wan would be executive producers stating, "James [Wan] and I, as executive producers, are still treating it like our baby; we'll still oversee it. I've definitely been privy to the ideas they've had and the scripts they've been writing, and it's coming along well. I'm actually excited". That following month, Darren Lynn Bousman, who previously directed Saw II and Saw III, was announced to return as director. David Hackl, who served as production designer for the two previous Saw films, was offered to direct the film, but the day he received the offer his wife was diagnosed with cancer. Producers offered him directorial duties for Saw V and Saw VI.

As Whannell was uninterested in writing any more Saw films, Twisted Pictures sought new writers and ideas for the fourth Saw film, making it the first film to not be written by him. An executive discovered Marcus Dunstan and Patrick Melton and read their script The Midnight Man. The executive thought that the duo's script could serve as a prequel to the first film, detailing a traumatic event in Jigsaw/John's early life. However, producers Mark Burg and Oren Koules did not want to do a prequel and dropped the idea, but the script led Dunstan and Melton to be hired to write the next three Saw films. Thomas Fenton also joined Dunstan and Melton as writer to the film. Marek Posival was attached to write at one point.

Stepping into the franchise was tricky for Dunstan and Melton, given the serialized nature of the Saw films. However, they counted on Bousman and the crew to watch over them, pitching a trilogy that would start with Saw IV and conclude in Saw VI. The duo did not have any trouble in bringing Jigsaw back into the story despite his death in the last film, as the character had been dying since the original film, feeling that the film would not feel like a Saw entry without the character. Like in previous entries, rewrites took place during the writing process, leading many unused ideas for the film to later be recycled for Saw V.

Even though Tobin Bell's Jigsaw Killer character was killed off in the previous entry, in March 2007 it was announced that he signed on for Saw IV and Saw V.

With a production budget of $10 million, principal photography took place from April 16, 2007, to May 3, 2007, in Toronto.

== Release ==
Saw IV was eventually released in Australia on October 25, 2007, and one day later, on October 26, 2007, in the United States and Canada. Lionsgate held its fourth annual "Give Til It Hurts" blood drive for the Red Cross.

=== Soundtrack ===
Saw IV (Music from and Inspired by Saw IV) was released on October 23, 2007, by Artists' Addiction Records. The film's theme song "I.V." was written by Yoshiki and performed by the rock group X Japan.

=== Home media ===
The DVD and Blu-ray was released on January 22, 2008, by Lionsgate Home Entertainment. It grossed $32.7 million in home sales. The film was released on 4K UHD in an Amazon-exclusive steelbook on October 21, 2025.

== Reception ==
=== Box office ===
The film grossed $63,300,095 in the United States and Canada with an additional $76,052,538 in other markets, bringing the worldwide total to $139,352,633.

=== Critical reception ===
Saw IV was not screened in advance for critics. On the review aggregator website Rotten Tomatoes, 19% of 84 critics' reviews are positive, with an average rating of 3.9/10. The website's consensus reads: "Saw IV is more disturbing than compelling, with material already seen in the prior installments." Metacritic, which uses a weighted average, assigned the film a score of 36 out of 100, based on 16 critics, indicating "generally unfavorable" reviews. Audiences polled by CinemaScore gave the film an average grade of "B" on an A+ to F scale.

Scott Schueller, writing for the Chicago Tribune, called it "a film as edgy as a rubber knife” and said that "if the terrible craft of Bousman's film doesn't turn your stomach, the borderline pornographic violence will. It's disconcerting to imagine anyone enjoying the vile filth splashing the screen." Frank Scheck from The Hollywood Reporter said "the famously inventive torture sequences here seem depleted of imagination", but added that "it hasn't yet jumped the shark like such predecessors as the Nightmare on Elm Street and Friday the 13th movies eventually did."

Peter Hartlaub from The San Francisco Chronicle called it "the Syriana of slasher films, so complicated and circuitous that your only hope of understanding everything is to eat lots of fish the night before and then watch each of the previous films, in order, right before you enter the theater." James Berardinelli wrote that "Saw IV functions as a drawn-out, tedious epilogue to a series that began with an energetic bang three years ago with Saw, then progressively lost momentum, coherence, and intelligence with each successive annual installment."

A less negative review came from Jamie Russell from the BBC, who called it "deeply unsettling; just like a horror movie should be."
