= David Hackl =

Canadian filmmaker (born 1963)

- Born: David Hackl; February 7, 1963 (age 63); Toronto, Canada
- Occupations: Film director, production designer
- Years active: 1994–present
- Known for: Saw franchise

David Hackl (born 7 February 1963) is a Canadian film director and production designer.

== Life and career ==
Hackl was the production designer and second unit director for Saw II, Saw III, and Saw IV; as well as for Repo! The Genetic Opera. He was in talks to direct Saw IV, but Darren Lynn Bousman returned as the director. Later it was reported that Hackl would direct both Saw V and Saw VII, but eventually he only directed Saw V, while Saw VII was directed by Kevin Greutert, the editor of all of the Saw films to date, who also directed Saw VI. Despite negative reviews of the film, his direction in Saw V has been referred to by Digital Spy as "slick direction". Hackl directed Jeff Reher's speculative script Endangered and was set to direct the film adaption of the novel The Butcher Bride.

== Filmography ==
- Mary Silliman's War (1994) (art director)
- Jerry and Tom (1998) (production designer)
- Zebra Lounge (2001) (production designer)
- Club Land (2001) (production designer)
- Cybermutt (2002) (production designer)
- The Riverman (2004) (production designer)
- Redemption: The Stan Tookie Williams Story (2004) (production designer)
- Saw II (2005) (production designer)
- Skinwalkers (2006) (production designer)
- Saw III (2006) (second unit director/production designer)
- Saw IV (2007) (second unit director/production designer)
- Repo! The Genetic Opera (2008) (second unit director/production designer)
- Outlander (2008) (production designer)
- Saw V (2008) (director)
- The Fatal Five (2009) (actor)
- Into the Grizzly Maze a.k.a. Endangered a.k.a. Red Machine (2013) (director)
- Life on the Line (2015) (director)
- Daughter of the Wolf (2019) (director)
- Dangerous (2021) (director)
