= Joshua Okamoto =

Japanese and Mexican actor (born 1995)

Joshua Okamoto ジョシュア・オカモト
- Born: Joshua Ernesto Okamoto Brambila; 17 July 1995 (age 30); Saitama, Japan
- Occupation: Actor

Joshua Ernesto Okamoto Brambila (岡本 ジョシュア, Okamoto Joshua; born 17 July 1995) is a Japanese-born Mexican actor. He is known for his roles in Control Z (2022) as Gibrán, Sexo, pudor y lágrimas 2 (2022) as Fichas, and Narcos: Mexico (2018) as Manuel.

== Early life ==
Okamoto was born on 17 July 1995 in Saitama, Japan, the son of a Japanese father and Mexican mother, the actress Elizabeth Brambila. Okamoto was registered in the Mexican foreign service, thus obtaining Mexican nationality. Shortly after he was born, he and his family moved to Mexico, where they settled in Guadalajara, Jalisco. It was here that he became interested and involved in the performing arts. When he grew up, he emigrated to the State of Mexico, and settled in the city of Tlalnepantla de Baz, where he studied acting at the CasAzul Artes Escénicas Argos school.

== Career ==
Okamoto worked under the direction of Alex Sánchez in the drama Sonriendo con el corazón (2019). In 2021 he starred in the film Muerte al verano. He appeared in the Netflix series Control Z (2022) as Gibrán, and in the film Sexo, pudor y lágrimas 2 (2021) as Fichas. He made his Hollywood debut in 2023 with the tenth film in the Saw franchise entitled Saw X as Diego.

== Filmography ==
=== Film ===
Year	Title	Role	Reference
2018	El club de los insomnes	Duende	
2019	Con olor a Guanajuato	Makako	
2021	Muerte en verano	Román	
2022	Sexo, pudor y lágrimas 2	Fichas	
2023	Saw X	Diego	
TBA	Berehezade	Mino	

=== Television ===
Year	Title	Role	Reference
2018	Narcos: Mexico	Manuel	
2019	The Club	Extra	
2022	Control Z	Gibrán	
2023	VGLY	Trippy Bacha	
