= Saw V =

2008 film by David Hackl

- Theatrical release poster
- Directed by: David Hackl
- Screenplay by: Patrick Melton; Marcus Dunstan
- Produced by: Gregg Hoffman (Note: Although Hoffman died in 2005, he had received posthumous producer credit in films produced by Twisted Pictures starting with Saw III (2006).); Oren Koules; Mark Burg
- Starring: Tobin Bell; Costas Mandylor; Scott Patterson; Betsy Russell; Mark Rolston; Julie Benz; Carlo Rota; Meagan Good
- Cinematography: David A. Armstrong
- Edited by: Kevin Greutert
- Music by: Charlie Clouser
- Production company: Twisted Pictures
- Distributed by: Lionsgate Films
- Release date: October 24, 2008
- Running time: 92 minutes
- Country: United States
- Language: English
- Budget: $10.8 million
- Box office: $118.2 million

Saw V is a 2008 American horror film directed by David Hackl, in his directorial debut, from a screenplay by Patrick Melton and Marcus Dunstan. A sequel to Saw IV (2007) and the fifth installment in the Saw film series, it stars Tobin Bell, Costas Mandylor, Scott Patterson, Betsy Russell, Mark Rolston, Julie Benz, Carlo Rota, and Meagan Good.

The plot follows FBI Agent Peter Strahm (Patterson) investigating the murders committed by the Jigsaw Killer (Bell), but as he delves deeper into the case, he realizes that the murders are part of a larger, more intricate plot. Meanwhile, Jigsaw's accomplice, Mark Hoffman (Mandylor), has been promoted to lieutenant and is tasked with leading the investigation into the Jigsaw murders. However, as Strahm gets closer to the truth, he becomes the target of Jigsaw's traps.

Melton and Dunstan, the writers of Saw IV, returned to write the film. Filming took place in Toronto from March to April 2008. Saw V was released by Lionsgate Films in the United States on October 24, 2008. The film received generally negative reviews from critics and grossed $118.2 million worldwide. A sequel, Saw VI, was released in 2009.

== Plot ==
Convicted murderer Seth Baxter wakes up chained to a table beneath a pendulum blade. He is told that he can release himself by crushing his hands between two presses. He does so, but the blade still bisects him as someone watches through a hole in the wall.

FBI agent Peter Strahm escapes from the room he was locked in by Detective Hoffman. (Note: As depicted in Saw IV) He is then attacked by a figure in a pig mask and wakes up with his head sealed in a box that is quickly filling with water. Outside, Hoffman delivers Corbett, the kidnapped daughter of Jeff, (Note: As depicted in Saw III) to the police and claims they are the only survivors. Strahm, having survived the trap by performing a tracheotomy with his pen, is brought out alive as well.

Hoffman is promoted and credited with closing the Jigsaw case. Hoffman later finds a note in his office reading "I know who you are", and learns of Agent Lindsey Perez's death while taking Strahm's cell phone from the police evidence room. At the hospital, Strahm tells Hoffman that Perez's last words were "Detective Hoffman" and questions how he escaped the plant. After being put on medical leave by his boss, Agent Dan Erickson, Strahm, suspicious of Hoffman, decides to uncover his involvement with Jigsaw and takes case files of past Jigsaw victims to research them.

In an underground sewer, Ashley, Brit, Charles, Luba and Mallick awaken with collars locked around their necks, connected by cables to a set of blades mounted on the wall behind them. The keys to the collars are in individual glass boxes across the room. A videotape says that they are all connected and that they must "do the opposite" of their instincts if they are all to survive the tests ahead of them. Ashley fails to retrieve the key and gets decapitated. In the second room, which is filled with explosives on a timer, Charles first attacks Mallick and then Luba, but she, Brit, and Mallick each retrieve keys to bomb shelters set in the walls. Charles is left to die when the timer expires and the explosives detonate.

Strahm learns that Hoffman killed Seth Baxter, who had killed Hoffman's sister, years prior. John Kramer abducted Hoffman after the fact and blackmailed him into helping him set up his future "games."

In the third room, Brit kills Luba before she and Mallick put her corpse in a bathtub and connect it to five cables to complete an electric circuit that unlocks the next door.

John's ex-wife Jill Tuck claims Strahm is stalking her. Strahm concludes that everyone was meant to die at the plant except for Corbett and Hoffman. After Hoffman tells Erickson about Strahm's theory of a second Jigsaw accomplice, Erickson tries to call him. Hoffman answers on Strahm's phone and hangs up. Erickson has one of his agents track the phone's signal.

In the final room, Mallick and Brit find a machine fitted with five saws and a beaker requiring ten pints of blood to open the final door. They realize that all the tests could have been completed without casualties if they had worked together: the keys in Room 1 were all the same and could unlock any collar, the bomb shelters in Room 2 could fit two people each, the circuit in Room 3 could have been completed if everyone suffered a small, harmless shock at once, and Room 4 would only require two pints from each person if they'd all reached it. This leads to Brit and Mallick figuring out the group's connection—they were all involved in a building fire that killed eight people. Mallick and Brit concede a truce and each slice an arm in the saws to provide the blood needed to open the final door. Mallick sacrifices himself as he allows his arm to be cut in half, saving Brit from the worst of it.

Following the signal to the sewer observation room, Erickson finds the phone and his own personnel file, both planted by Hoffman. He also finds the still-living Brit and Mallick and calls for medical attention, before putting an all-points bulletin on Strahm, convinced that he is Jigsaw's successor. Meanwhile, Strahm follows Hoffman to the renovated nerve gas house and finds a tape in a room with a box filled with broken glass. The tape is a message from Hoffman urging Strahm to enter the box, but Strahm stops it short and ambushes Hoffman, whom he seals in the box. Strahm believes he has finally caught Hoffman, but the door to the room shuts itself and the walls begin to close in as the box is lowered beneath the floor. Strahm finishes playing the tape, which says that if he does not enter the box, he will die and be framed as Jigsaw's apprentice. Safe inside the box, Hoffman watches as Strahm unsuccessfully tries to escape the room and is crushed to death.

== Cast ==
- Tobin Bell as Jigsaw / John Kramer
- Costas Mandylor as Mark Hoffman
- Scott Patterson as Agent Strahm
- Betsy Russell as Jill
- Julie Benz as Brit
- Meagan Good as Luba
- Mark Rolston as Dan Erickson
- Carlo Rota as Charles
- Greg Bryk as Mallick
- Laura Gordon as Ashley
- Joris Jarsky as Seth
- Mike Butters as Paul
- Al Sapienza as Chief of Police
- Mike Realba as Detective Fisk
- Jeff Pustil as Bernie
- Samantha Lemole as Pamela Jenkins
- Niamh Wilson as Corbett
- Tony Nappo as Gus
- Tim Burd as Obi
- Sarah Power as Angelina

== Production ==
=== Development and writing ===
Pre-production began in October 2007 with Saw IV writers Patrick Melton and Marcus Dunstan outlining the story. David Hackl made his directorial debut with Saw V. He previously served as the production designer of Saw II, Saw III, and Saw IV and second unit director for Saw III and Saw IV. Hackl spoke about the fast-paced writing process saying, "We have about a week to write the outline, then the script by the end of the month. We're really just throwing down the ideas now and it's coming together quickly. I've been with Darren on all of [the sequels], we've always arrived just before Christmas with a script that needed a lot of shakedown but, before shooting, [the script] is really tight. Right until the last days of filming we're always changing things and adjusting things just seeing what works as the story unfolds and I think that's why people like them—because we never let them rest. We don't go into pre-production with a white script and say, 'That's it no changes.' We push it so there's no holes." He aimed to bring a more emotional context to film so the audience would have an emotional investment to the character in the traps. Without that, Hackl felt the traps would be "just like any gory horror film", which he did not want.

=== Casting and filming ===
Tobin Bell, Scott Patterson, Costas Mandylor and Betsy Russell reprised their roles as Jigsaw/John, Agent Strahm, Detective Hoffman, and Jill, respectively. Patterson had signed on through Saw VI but stated, "that doesn't mean I'll actually be in it or do it. It's their option". Bell, whose character was killed in Saw III, shot all new flashback scenes for the film. Bell stated that Russell's character Jill, who plays his ex-wife, would not be featured as prominently as in Saw IV, but "still plays an important part in the story".

Julie Benz was cast as Brit, a real estate developer who is put in a Jigsaw trap. Benz described her as a "very unlikeable character". On her experience filming she said, "Filming the movie freaked me out. I had nightmares. I'd never been in a psychological horror movie. It actually affected me on a deep level. I don't know if I can actually see this one". However, Benz praised Hackl's directing techniques, such as using a full storyboard on set which helped the actors know the correct camera angles at any given time.

Principal photography took place from March 17 to April 28, 2008, in Toronto.

== Reception ==
=== Box office ===
Saw V was released in the United States on October 24, 2008 by Lionsgate Films. In its opening weekend, Saw V grossed $30,053,954 in 3,060 theaters in the United States and Canada, ranking number two at the box office behind High School Musical 3: Senior Year. It grossed $56,746,769 in the United States and Canada, and an additional $57,117,290 in other markets, for a worldwide total of $113,864,059.

=== Critical response ===
On the review aggregator website Rotten Tomatoes, 13% of 75 critics' reviews are positive, with an average rating of 3.2/10. The website's consensus reads: "If its plot were as interesting as its torture devices, or its violence less painful than its performances, perhaps Saw V might not feel like it was running on fumes." Metacritic, which uses a weighted average, assigned the film a score of 20 out of 100, based on 13 critics, indicating "generally unfavorable" reviews. Audiences polled by CinemaScore gave the film an average grade of "C" on an A+ to F scale, the lowest of the franchise.

Elizabeth Weizman of the New York Daily News gave Saw V one out of five stars. She believed that the lack of Tobin Bell's Jigsaw character hurt the film: "Bell's deliciously twisted madman was the lifeline of this series and, without him, we're left watching a routine horror flick that might as well have gone straight to DVD. The series began with two major assets that set it apart: the concept of a brilliantly righteous executioner, and the actor who played him. Now, aside from Bell's brief, intermittent cameos, it has neither. So where the original Saw was diabolical fun, this fifth installment is as bloodless as the most unfortunate of Jigsaw's victims." Sam Adams of the Los Angeles Times wrote that "The virtues of the individual films are almost beside the point, since it's hard to imagine why anyone would want to pick up the thread at this late date, but Saw V is a particularly dull and discombobulated affair, shot and acted with all the flair of a basic-cable procedural".

Some reviews were positive, however. The British website Digital Spy rated it three out of five stars and commended the film for its "solid acting, slick direction and suitably filthy cinematography too", while also stating it will "make far more sense to those familiar with the previous installments". Jim Vejvoda of IGN awarded the film with three out of five stars stating that the film ties up most of the loose ends of the previous four installments while also having a more straightforward and less complicated storyline. They also praised the traps for being the most inventive and best that the Saw franchise has had to offer.

== Home media ==
Charlie Clouser, who provided the score for all previous Saw films, returned to compose the score for the film. The "Saw V Original Motion Picture Soundtrack" was released on October 21, 2008, by Artists' Addiction Records. Spence D. from IGN.com gave the soundtrack a score of 7.9 out of 10, saying, "From start to finish the Saw V soundtrack flows with a sense of purpose and cohesion, the tracks having a unifying dark undercurrent that makes for an electric shocked jolting mixtape with dark intent."

Saw V was released on DVD on January 20, 2009. An unrated director's cut was released and runs approximately 3 minutes longer than the theatrical cut. The film grossed $28.8 million in home sales.
