= Jigsaw (Saw character) =

Fictional character from the Saw franchise

John Kramer
- Saw character
- Tobin Bell as Jigsaw in his signature black and red robe
- First appearance: Saw (2004)
- Last appearance: Saw X (2023)
- Created by: James Wan; Leigh Whannell
- Portrayed by: Tobin Bell

In-universe information
- Full name: John Kramer
- Aliases: Jigsaw; The Jigsaw Killer
- Occupation: Civil engineer (formerly); Architect (formerly)
- Spouses: Jill Tuck (deceased)
- Children: Gideon Kramer (deceased)
- Relatives: Unnamed nephew (deceased); Unnamed sibling
- Classification: Serial killer
- Apprentices: Logan Nelson (alive) Mark Hoffman (status unknown) Amanda Young (deceased) Lawrence Gordon (alive)
- M.O.: Genius-level intellect Engineer's psychology Vast resources Highly designed set of symbolic death traps Design and construction of machinery and devices for the use of torture Knowledge and application of electrical and mechanical engineering Philosophy; Physics
- Status: Deceased
- Died in: Saw III

John Kramer (also known as "The Jigsaw Killer" or simply "Jigsaw") is a fictional character and the main antagonist of the Saw franchise. The character made his debut in the first film of the series, Saw (2004), and appears in all subsequent installments, with the exception of Spiral (2021), in which he is only mentioned and featured in photographs. He is portrayed by American actor Tobin Bell.

In the film series, Kramer is a former civil engineer and architect dying from an inoperable frontal lobe tumor that had developed from colon cancer. After a suicide attempt, Kramer found a new appreciation for his life, and began abducting people and testing their will to live by placing them in deadly scenarios or traps, which he referred to as "games" or "tests", in which they were forced to make choices which involve inflicting pain upon themselves or others in order to escape. In doing so, he hoped survivors would gain a new appreciation for their lives. These tests were typically symbolic of what Jigsaw perceived as a flaw in each person's moral character or life. The "Jigsaw" moniker is given to him by the media for his practice of cutting a puzzle-piece shape of flesh from those who fail.

== Fictional character biography ==
=== Saw ===
Jigsaw first appears in the 2004 film Saw. In the series' narrative, John is a former engineer dying from an inoperable frontal lobe tumor. After a suicide attempt, John becomes psychopathic, furious at people willfully throwing their lives away, when people like him were having theirs cut undeservedly short. To both punish and enlighten the self-destructive, John creates lethal traps, devices, and scenarios that force his victims to inflict pain and anguish upon themselves or others in order to escape, though not always in one piece. As an engineer, John designs and builds the contraptions featured in the series. These systems are often a combination of explosives, mechanical and electrical systems. The tests are typically symbolic of what Jigsaw perceives as a flaw in each person's moral character or life. He cuts the shape of a puzzle piece from the remains of people who fail to survive his "tests", hence the nickname Jigsaw Killer. In Saw II, John says that the puzzle piece is meant to symbolize that the subject was "missing a vital piece of the human puzzle: the survival instinct."

The Jigsaw Killer's identity remains uncertain until the end of the first film. It is ultimately revealed that John Kramer has been posing as a bloodied corpse on the floor of the bathroom where Dr. Lawrence Gordon and Adam Stanheight's test is taking place.

=== Saw II ===
In Saw II, John leaves a clue to his location at the scene of a game. When the police apprehend him, John reveals to Detective Eric Matthews that Eric's son Daniel is trapped in a house filled with deadly nerve gas, along with several people who were framed by Eric for crimes they did not commit. John tells Eric that he will let Daniel survive if Eric talks to him until the game is complete. Eric eventually loses patience, assaults John, and forces John to lead him to the house at gunpoint. It is later revealed that the test in the house took place before John and Eric ever made contact, and Daniel was locked in a safe for the entirety of their conversation. Upon their arrival, John is rescued by Amanda Young, a survivor of an earlier Jigsaw test who has come to see John as a father figure and mentor.

=== Saw III ===
In Saw III, John's cancer has progressed and he is on his death bed. His apprentice, Amanda, begins to create impossible tests. This angers John, who does not see his games as outright murder because the participants have a chance of survival. John administers a final test to Amanda to decide whether she will be a worthy successor. Meanwhile, Dr. Lynn Denlon is forced to keep John alive via emergency surgery. Her husband Jeff also undergoes a test, meant to be a punishment for his inability to forgive a drunk driver who killed one of his children. John attempts to prevent Amanda from failing her test, but she admits that she no longer believes in John's philosophy and shoots Lynn. Jeff subsequently shoots and kills Amanda. Jeff then kills John with a power saw. As he dies, John pulls out a tape player revealing that Jeff has failed his test by killing him, and that Jigsaw has abducted Jeff and Lynn's daughter Corbett. Jeff is forced to play another game to find Corbett.

=== Saw IV ===
Saw IV opens with John's autopsy where a wax-coated tape is found in his stomach. The tape reveals to Detective Mark Hoffman that he will be tested, with the end of the film revealing that Hoffman is another one of John's accomplices. Saw IV also explores John's backstory. John was a successful civil engineer and property developer, as well as a devoted husband to his wife Jill Tuck. Jill ran a recovery clinic for drug users and was robbed by Cecil, one of her patients. Cecil accidentally injured her during the robbery and she subsequently miscarried. John became bitter after the loss of their unborn child, and he and Jill ultimately divorced. After being diagnosed with cancer and attempting suicide, John becomes the Jigsaw Killer and Cecil is his first victim.

The film also further illuminates Amanda Young's backstory and connection to John Kramer. In a flashback, it is revealed that Amanda, suffering from heroin withdrawal, was the one to convince Cecil to rob the clinic – inadvertently causing Jill's miscarriage and the couple's divorce. After Cecil became Jigsaw's first victim, John soon focused his sights on Amanda: seeing her as a good candidate for a trap due to her addiction and her role in Jill's assault.

=== Saw V ===
Saw V features flashbacks which explore the relationship between John and Detective Hoffman. Hoffman killed his sister's murderer with a deadly game that mimicked John's tests. Much like Amanda's tests, Hoffman's were inescapable. After discovering Hoffman's identity, John blackmailed Hoffman into becoming his apprentice. John also appears in a video will, in which he declares his love for Jill and leaves her a mysterious box.

=== Saw VI ===
In Saw VI, John appears in flashback as well as in video recordings. The recordings are for John's victim William Easton, who inadvertently caused John's death by denying his insurance claim. In a flashback set between the second and third films, John presents Amanda to Jill as proof that his games work as rehabilitation. A flashback set before the events of the third and fourth films explores the group dynamic between John, Amanda, and Hoffman. It is also revealed that John gave his ex-wife a key, which she later used to open the box he gave her in Saw V. In the present, it is revealed that the box contained six envelopes containing future test subjects, a thicker envelope, and an updated version of the "reverse bear trap". She gave Hoffman envelopes 1 to 5, but envelope 6 was intended for Jill to carry out alone. As per John's instructions, she places Hoffman in the "reverse bear trap"; fulfilling the promise made via the audio tape discovered in John's stomach during his autopsy in Saw IV that Hoffman would be tested.

=== Saw 3D ===
Saw 3D features flashbacks of John meeting Bobby Dagen, a man who acquired quick fame and fortune after falsifying a story about surviving a Jigsaw trap, at a book signing. Hoffman later makes Bobby go through a series of tests (including re-enacting the very test that he falsely claimed to have survived) in which he comes face-to-face with those who knew he lied (except his wife), but refused to expose his secret; all are killed in separate traps despite his efforts to save them. John appears at the end of the film, where it is revealed that he recruited Dr. Gordon (a survivor of one of Jigsaw's tests in the first film) as an apprentice.

=== Jigsaw ===
In Jigsaw, John's recorded voice is heard during the tests. He appears in person during the final test, confronting its two participants with the truth of their past misdeeds. After loading a double-barreled shotgun with one shell that he describes as "your key to freedom", he leaves the room. It is later revealed that this test took place ten years ago, and that John chose one of the five victims to become his first apprentice.

=== Spiral ===
In Spiral, John does not appear (except in photographs) but is said to have inspired the copycat killer central to the film's plot. Spiral is the only film in the series in which Tobin Bell does not reprise the role of John Kramer.

=== Saw X ===
In Saw X, set between the events of Saw and Saw II, John is undergoing treatment for brain cancer but is given notice that he will soon die of the disease. Through a reunion with an acquaintance from his support group, he learns of an unauthorized operation in Mexico City, where a groundbreaking new technique cures cancer patients. He travels there and undergoes the procedure given by Cecilia Pederson, "curing" him of his cancer; however, he soon realizes that the operation was a fake and everyone involved works to defraud cancer patients, making Pederson rich. John enlists the help of Amanda Young and Mark Hoffman, with Amanda traveling to Mexico City to help kidnap each fraudster and subject them to a trap to atone for their behavior. After Pederson seemingly escapes from her restraints, she puts John and Carlos, a local young boy John befriended, into the trap meant for her. However, it is soon revealed that John had planned for this. After Pederson attempts to retrieve the stolen money, John, Amanda, and Carlos are freed, leaving Pederson to attempt to escape her final trap. Ultimately, Pederson and her husband are trapped in the room, with toxic gas slowly filling the space around them. In the room is a single small air hole, just barely big enough for a human head to fit through. Pederson and her husband begin to fight, until she kills her husband and catches her breath through the air hole. However, she is left with no means of escape, and John, Amanda, and Carlos are free to leave. John gives Carlos the money before he leaves. Later on, John and Hoffman capture Henry Kessler, the man who introduced John to the scam and set him up for a trap.

== In other media ==
=== Saw: Rebirth ===
The character of John Kramer is also featured in the non-canon comic book Saw: Rebirth, which is set prior to the events of the first film. It filled in some of his history, showing him as a toy designer at Standard Engineering Ltd. who was too lazy to do much with his life, ultimately ending his relationship with Jill. Saw: Rebirth also reveals John's discovery that he had terminal cancer and outlined how his subsequent suicide attempt impacted his train of thought. His relationships with Dr. Lawrence Gordon, Zep Hindle, Paul, Amanda Young, and Mark were explored, along with his transformation into Jigsaw. Rebirth's continuity was ultimately contradicted by the backstory presented in Saw IV.

=== Saw: The Video Game ===
Tobin Bell reprises his role as the voice of Jigsaw in the Saw video game. He is shown on television screens dressed in his signature robes setting up traps for people and preaching his lesson of life appreciation to them. He frequently advises and taunts Detective Tapp as he traverses through an abandoned insane asylum, usually by way of the Billy the Puppet. In the game's "Freedom" ending, Tapp escapes from the asylum, but cannot overcome his obsession with Jigsaw and later commits suicide; the game's sequel confirms that this ending is canon.

=== Saw II: Flesh & Blood ===
Tobin Bell reprised his role as the voice of the Jigsaw Killer in the Saw: The Video Game sequel Saw II: Flesh & Blood. Tobin Bell also sold his likeness for John Kramer, who actually appears in the game.

John tests Detective Tapp's estranged son Michael, who is wanting to get to the bottom of his father's death. Jigsaw personally taunts Michael throughout the game, always being out of reach. Via case files, it is also revealed that he built nearly half of the city (explaining his numerous hideouts in the series). He appears to seek the destruction of the drug cartel run by corrupt cops. In the ending, he faces either Michael (tempting him into becoming another apprentice) or Campbell Iman (offering him freedom but forced to lure him into a lethal trap when he tries to attack him).

== Characterization ==
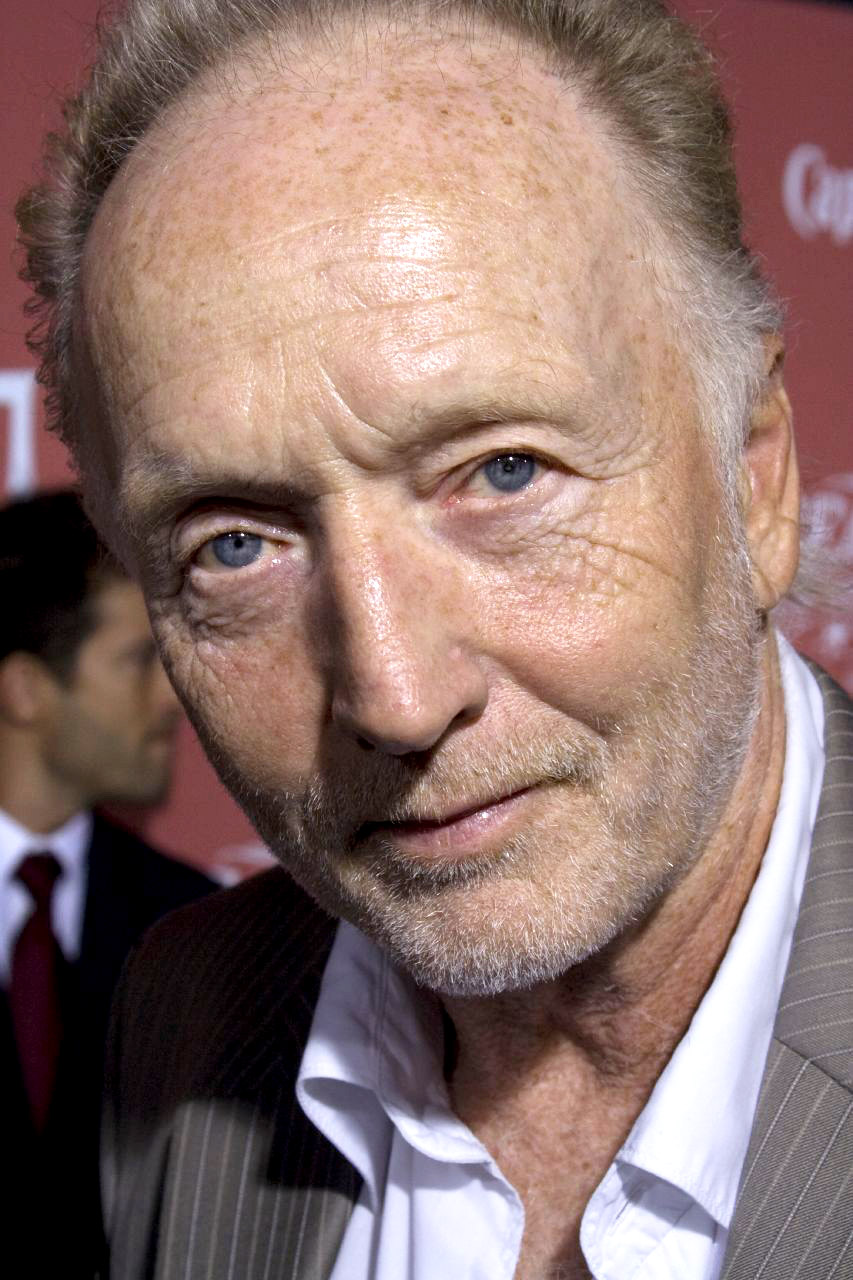
Actor Tobin Bell in 2007

The producers of the Saw films have fought to differentiate the Jigsaw Killer from other horror film killers. Darren Lynn Bousman, the director of Saw II, Saw III, and Saw IV, has stated on the character's role "He's not Jason or Freddy. He's not even Hannibal Lecter. He's a person with extreme beliefs and he really thinks he's making a difference. He's a vigilante if anything. He thinks he's making a difference." Tobin Bell, the actor who plays Jigsaw, describes his character's role as being more of a scientist or engineer and "he thinks very specifically and very pragmatically." About Jigsaw's games being detail-oriented, Bell said: "My sense is that Jigsaw is so detail-oriented that I think he thinks in terms of worst-case scenario. I think he's a very good judge of character, so his sense that, for example, that Detective Matthews was going to play right into his trap, which he did, was right on. Now, it seems to me that he's always got a second plan in place. And there's probably been a number of second plans. I mean, we've only seen three movies. Maybe there are six more somewhere where he failed, where something didn't play out." Speaking about playing the character, Bell stated that "[y]ou have to think of someone like Jigsaw from a very specific point of view. He doesn't view himself as some kind of diabolical psychotic. You know there's a little bit of evil in everyone. It just gets carried further. Most of us have some sort of moral fiber that restricts that. Some framework. And then others because of their lives and what happens to them, the thing develops in some other way."

Bousman mentioned that Saw III was intended to contain a scene in which Jigsaw showed remorse for his actions after seeing the results of his legacy:

For the first time, we actually see him break down and cry. Imagine your entire life's work. You're on your deathbed. You know there's nothing else you can do and here's how you'll be remembered: as a killer, as a murderer. Not as someone who helped people. Not as someone who changed lives. Someone who took away lives. The one thing he didn't want to be and, as he's on his deathbed, he's realizing this.

As a result of his cancer and suicide attempt, John decided to dedicate the rest of his life to teaching people to appreciate their own lives. The producers of Saw III and director Bousman see Jigsaw, not as a serial killer, but a "scientist" who is determined to initiate the survival instinct in his "subjects", believing that humanity no longer uses its instinct of survival.

While the character's discovery that he has cancer is acknowledged to be the "final straw" that drove him to his actions, Bell has stated in an interview that "His terminal cancer is one of the elements of his life but he's as angry over the fact the world is going to hell in handbasket because it's no longer the survival of the fittest; it's the survival of the mediocre. That drives him as much as anything else. He doesn't just talk about his frustrations, he does something about them, and he puts himself on the line. His cancer was about one element in about 130 elements that caused him to create the world that he's created."

John is depicted in the Saw films as being extremely cunning and intelligent. In Saw: Rebirth, he is depicted doing extensive study in multiple fields to gain knowledge for designing his tests, and recurring director Bousman himself has described Jigsaw as being "extremely educated" in an interview.

Saw X director Kevin Greutert said bringing Tobin Bell back as Jigsaw was the first thing he wanted out of the film and "to have a little fun with the tropes of the Saw series and maybe not present John Kramer as completely infallible, and, in fact, he stumbles rather badly a few times in this film, but hopefully the sacred aspects of the character remain satisfying for the audience". Lane Rozin Phifer writes that Saw X was less focused on traps "and mostly centers around John's complex character, highlighting the hypocrisy of his own work against others doing things that are just as bad, if not, worse." Chase Hutchinson writes that the events of the film "essentially birth Jigsaw into the maniac that will carry out even more harebrained torture schemes" and he is granted "a new lease on life" despite remaining sick.

== Symbolic representations ==
=== Traps ===
In the series, John usually builds deadly traps for his subjects, which are often a symbolic representation of what he perceives as a flaw in the person's life (most of the traps are made of scavenged materials, rusty bolts, decaying iron, or anything else he thinks will help him create a new "game"). John calls these tests "games", and tells the person the "rules" of the game, usually by microcasette or video tape. The rules are tasks that the person must perform in order to pass the test and survive, though the tasks often involve extreme self-mutilation; however, not only have there been occasions where it is possible for the subject not to harm themself if they are bright enough (such as the "razor box trap" in Saw II ), but not all of the traps require self-mutilation, as one trap actually required a man (Jeff Denlon) to burn his deceased son's possessions to retrieve the key to save the second victim.

Many of the games involve measured time constraints provided to the victims, such as clocks or active timers. John elaborated on his appreciation of "time" in Saw II, outlining the importance of savoring every moment. He also stated his belief that telling someone the time in which they may die would awaken an alertness for every moment of existence.

Jake Huntley wrote of the complexity of Jigsaw's character in the Irish Journal of Gothic and Horror Studies. Huntley described the intention behind John's actions, and evaluated the extent to which they can be analyzed to fit into the philosophies associated with Deleuze, Darwin, and Nietzsche:

The subject of one of Jigsaw's games is therefore always presented with an opportunity, the aim of which is to reinvigorate the potential of the subject, jump-start the survival instinct and instill a celebration or "savoring" of life. In Deleuzian terms, it is the potential of life that is at stake... It is this that gives Jigsaw's games their Deleuzian tone, the urgent revitalisation of life occasioning new experiences to be learnt and assimilated: such as the perverse, singular and aberrant situation of waking to find a man-trap secured around your neck. There is then the instruction to live or die, to make your choice, to survive the encounter with affect, or the affection-image... There is no thrill, sadistic or otherwise, in setting these games; they are throws of the die by the subjects, aleatoric opportunities... As Jigsaw makes clear to Detective Matthews during their conversation in Saw II, where Jigsaw's motivation and philosophy are most comprehensively explored, "I've never murdered anyone in my life. The decisions are up to them." Whilst it probably wouldn't stand up in court, he is at least correct in his usual, carefully literal sense. The decisions, the choices, the selection of a potential, are in the hands of the subjects of his games and he only intervenes in order to keep the game within its rules so a decision can be reached. The subjects are faced with a shocking choice that forces them to acknowledge what Deleuze identifies as the virtual – that is, the unacknowledged aspects of our experience with reality. This, in effect, is the particular game that Jigsaw himself plays; one where the organism might be failing but the flow of desire succeeds and endures. Jigsaw might resort to discussing Darwin's "little trip to the Galapagos Islands" to provide a theoretical underpinning for his project and echo Nietzsche in talking of the will to survive, but this merely misdirects investigators and witnesses in the same way that the gruesome traps and freely flowing gore earn him his unsettling serial killer soubriquet. Jigsaw's games are designed to crack open the world of their respective players: the challenges are nearly always relevant to the subject's lifestyle in a symbolic or literal way, bringing them to painful self awareness, prompting a reappraisal of their squandered potential.

Through his traps, John intends to force his victims to prove that they are "worthy" and "deserving" to continue living; ideally, the victims will also learn to abandon what he perceives to be their vices. He often expressed a desire for his victims to succeed, but stressed that their fate was always in their own hands. The video and audio tape instructions for his games often echo this idea: "Live or die. Make your choice."

=== Billy the Puppet ===
Billy the Puppet is an icon of the Jigsaw character. John has often used this puppet character for the purpose of delivering messages to his victims via a television screen, but at times it has also been physically present with the victims during their tests. He provided the (disguised) voice for Billy when it delivered its messages. It is shown in Saw IV that the original puppet was created by John as an intended toy for his unborn son Gideon, who died while Cecil Adams was robbing the clinic; Cecil accidentally pushed the door into Jill, which resulted in Gideon's death. John is shown constructing a more sinister Billy puppet in Saw III for the purpose of its inclusion in his "games".

=== Microcassettes ===
Another of John's trademarks is his use of microcassettes to deliver instructions to his victims, disguising his voice as on the Billy videotapes. A flashback in Saw IV reveals that he accomplished this by speaking into a reel-to-reel tape recorder, then slowing down the playback. Often, a victim would find a microcassette recorder left for them with a tape already loaded in, while at other times the tape would be found separately in an envelope marked with the victim's name or the tape on its own reading "Play Me". One tape was found in John's stomach during his autopsy at the beginning of Saw IV, coated in wax to protect it against his digestive acids. Both of his apprentices, Amanda Young and Mark Hoffman, eventually began making their own microcassettes, but not always altering their voices as he did. In Saw 3D, Hoffman recorded one set of instructions on a standard-sized cassette, and another on an 8-track tape for use in a car stereo.

Huntley remarked that John's voice recordings operated for a specific purpose as part of his M.O.: they allowed John to be present, not as "a participant or even a spectator but instead as a referee, observing the rules pertinent to that particular subject rather than salaciously enjoying the 'victim's agony.'"

=== Pig mask ===
The pig mask is a thematic prop worn by John and his accomplices throughout the Saw film series to conceal their identities while abducting their "test subjects". As the series continues, the purpose of the pig mask is explored in detail; it is explained to be a tribute to the "Year of the Pig", the year in which John started his work.

The origin of the pig mask was shown in Saw IV, revealing the first known pig masks to have been latex strap-on masks used at a "Year of the Pig" Chinese New Year festival. John had snatched them and donned one, while using the other one to hold his chloroform-soaked rag. The second mask was then used to knock out his first test subject, Cecil, by placing the mask over his head with the chloroform rag still inside.

When working on the original Saw film, writer Leigh Whannell and director James Wan wanted their antagonist to have some sort of mask. After some discussion, the idea of Jigsaw wearing a rotting pig's head was chosen to symbolize his pessimistic view of the world and the disease that he was "rotting" from.

Amanda Young wearing the pig mask

Nevertheless, the mask given to them from production (a rubber Halloween mask) was considered by them to be less than satisfactory. A number of things were added to make it look more gruesome, including long black hair and pus running from its eyes and nostrils. Whannell has still admitted to being disappointed with its final appearance compared to his intended one, but has admitted that the mask has since become one of the "staples" of the Saw franchise.

Along with Billy and perhaps John himself, the mask has since become one of the more iconic symbols of the franchise. It has appeared on both the posters for the first film and the fourth. The mask has also been featured on many forms of merchandise. Officially licensed pig mask accessories have been sold for Halloween. In addition, the mask has been featured on numerous Jigsaw action figures. NECA has released two Jigsaw figurines with the pig mask; the original was John wearing the mask in his black cloak, and a Saw III variant of John wearing it in his red cloak. In addition, the Be@rBrick line has released a "bear" version of John wearing the pig mask. Medicom has also released a figurine of John wearing his infamous pig mask in the "Real Action Hero" line.

On the commentary track of Saw IV, several discussions occur about John's decision to use references to pigs. In the series, the producers explained that John was a spiritual person; however, it has never been revealed what religion he follows. In Saw IV, John's ex-wife Jill explains his organized and planned lifestyle, stating that she had conceived their miscarried son Gideon, with John planning for him to be born in the Year of the Pig. On the commentary track, the producers explain that in the Chinese zodiac, the Pig stands for fertility and rebirth. John is seen several times throughout the series with figurines of clay soldiers and buddhas, further symbolizing his reverence to various Asian cultures.

=== Jigsaw puzzle pieces ===
Cut-outs were made, in the shape of jigsaw puzzle pieces, from the flesh of John's deceased victims who failed to pass their test. John received the nickname "Jigsaw" from the police and the press stemming from his tendency to perform such a ritual; however, he never encouraged that name and in fact disapproved of it.

Huntley argued that the jigsaw pieces that John cut out of the flesh of his failed test subjects was not intended as a mere stylized signature, but rather that it had a much deeper philosophical reflection. He stated that:

Far from being a stamp of final approval, a post-(mortem)-script to the game, the jigsaw piece represents the admission of the subject's missing survival instinct, the corporeal body's non-relational or "snagged" desire. Those marked with jigsaw pieces are the ones that got away, left inert, reduced to the zero intensity of death. It would seem strange that Jigsaw – surely the last figure ever to be deemed sentimental – should choose to extract this symbolic jigsaw piece from these subjects, except that Jigsaw is linguistically consistent in explaining how he "takes" or "cuts" the piece of skin. The jigsaw shape marking those who "fail" is the adding of a subtraction – in effect, the removal of their inability, their unfulfilled potential or their lack – the excision that leaves the whole of the body that is not the closed, inert corporeal body but is, instead, the "body-without-organs," that is, the nexus point where energy pools amid the flow and fold of forces and durations, existence beyond the living organism.

A hand-drawn jigsaw puzzle piece was also present on the back of a photograph in Saw as part of a clue for one of his games.

=== Apprentices ===
Throughout the Saw series, John developed a tendency to recruit "apprentices" to carry on his perceived mission. Amanda Young, Detective Mark Hoffman, Dr. Lawrence Gordon, Logan Nelson, and two masked men named Pighead (Saw: The Video Game) and Pighead II (Saw II: Flesh & Blood) are the only known Jigsaw apprentices. Jill Tuck was an assistant in a certain game.

Huntley analyzed Jigsaw's intentions in taking in protégés as stemming from the terminally ill character's desire to overcome death itself, and argues that this is further evidence of his thought process being characterized by Deleuzian philosophy. Huntley argued:

Jigsaw decides that the answer is to achieve immortality through a legacy, having a successor to continue with his work. The impulse is Deleuzian. Jigsaw remains calm, neutral and impassive throughout the Saw films (not least because of his terminal condition) yet his only expressed wish, concern or desire, is that his legacy is maintained – the work of testing the fabric of humanity should go on. "Jigsaw" – as the intensive site of being, a locus of desire, the body-without-organs – can survive the death of the organism John Kramer... What seems to be consistent thematically through the Saw films is that "Jigsaw" is a part for various players, an identity composed of pieces...

John was also assisted by Obi in the kidnapping of the victims of the nerve gas house, shortly before the events of Saw II, and Zep Hindle throughout the first film. It is said in the directors commentary that Brad and Ryan worked for Lawrence and acted as his muscle, recruited after their trap. They helped Lawrence to abduct Hoffman and they chained him in the bathroom.

Kevin Greutert, the editor of Saw, Saw II, Saw III, Saw IV, and Saw V, and the director of Saw VI and Saw 3D, stated that Amanda, in particular, is "such a peculiar aspect of the Jigsaw character", citing that John had developed genuine "tender feelings" for her.

The term "apprentice" was used in the official plot synopses for Saw III and Saw IV.

=== Theatrical robe ===
John is usually seen wearing a black theatrical robe with a large hood and red lining when running traps or abducting victims. On the commentary track for the first Saw film, it was revealed that the producers originally wanted Jigsaw to have a red robe with a black interior. Thinking that the red robe was too vibrant for the film, they soon reversed the robe to make it black with a red interior. Amanda wore a similar robe in Saw III in an attempt to symbolically emulate her mentor.

== Reception ==
A review of Saw II in the San Francisco Chronicle praised Tobin Bell and John as being "more terrifying than the movie villains in Hollywood's last five horror films put together; even though he's in a wheelchair and hooked up to multiple IVs."

Don Summer, a writer for Best-Horror-Movies.com, stated that "the villain, in Jigsaw, is brilliant and formidable" and that actor Tobin Bell has done a "fantastic job" for his role.

Neil Smith, a film reviewer for the BBC, described Bell's Jigsaw as "creepy", describing the character as adding "a palpably sinister charge" to the scenes he appeared in.

Sorcha Ní Fhlainn, a reviewer for the Irish Journal of Gothic and Horror Studies, remarked that Tobin Bell's Jigsaw had become such an entrenched staple of the Saw franchise that the character's reduced appearance in Saw V was drastically felt. Ní Fhlainn also commented that Jigsaw's unique character was not successfully compensated for by his apparent successor in Saw V, Mark Hoffman. Ní Fhlainn went to the extent to remark that the character of Jigsaw is so central to the Saw franchise that it should have ended with Jigsaw's death at the end of Saw III.

Similarly, several critics who reviewed Saw 3D lamented Bell's minimal screentime in the film, with Eric Goldman of IGN writing that he found it "impossible not to be bothered by how little time was spent" with the character.

Reviewing Saw X, Owen Gleiberman wrote that John Kramer was "so front and center that Tobin Bell has never given such a full-scale performance as the human behind Jigsaw." Some commentators also found Bell and Smith's noticeable aging since last playing their characters in films set after the prequel to be occasionally distracting.

Tobin Bell was nominated for a Spike TV Scream Award three times in the category of "Most Vile Villain" for his portrayal of Jigsaw in 2006 for Saw II, in 2007 (alongside Shawnee Smith's portrayal of Amanda) for Saw III, and in 2008 for Saw IV.

Jigsaw ranked 30th in Empire magazine's "100 Greatest Movie Characters" list, 47th on Total Film's list of "100 Greatest Movie Villains", and 4th on Yahoo! Movies "13 Iconic Villains in Horror History" list. Horrornews ranked Tobin Bell as 10th on their list of the Top 13 Greatest Horror Movie Actors.

== See also ==
- List of horror film antagonists
