= Billy the Puppet =

Puppet character in the Saw franchise

- Saw character
- Billy the Puppet in the 2003 short film
- First appearance: Saw 0.5 (2003)
- Created by: James Wan; Leigh Whannell
- Voiced by: Tobin Bell; Costas Mandylor

In-universe information
- Nickname: Billy the Puppet
- Species: Puppet
- Gender: Male
- Relationships: John Kramer (creator and voice); Mark Hoffman (voice)
- M.O.: Delivering messages to subjects of Jigsaw via television screen or in person

Billy is a puppet that appears in the Saw franchise. The puppet belongs to the series' antagonist John "Jigsaw" Kramer, also known as the "Jigsaw Killer", a civil engineer and architect who, after a terminal cancer diagnosis and suicide attempt, begins abducting people and testing their will to survive by placing them in deadly traps. He referred to these tests as "games", in which they are forced to make choices; in doing so, he hoped survivors would gain a new appreciation for their lives. Kramer often used Billy the Puppet to communicate the details of said traps, and the means by which the test subjects could survive, with the puppet appearing in video recordings or occasionally in-person, at the site of the trap.

In the film series, before becoming the Jigsaw Killer, Kramer created a wooden doll similar to Billy as a gift to his unborn child, whom he and his wife Jill Tuck planned to name Gideon. In Saw IV (2007), it is revealed that Jill miscarried after being struck in the stomach by a door during an altercation with drug addict Cecil Adams. Kramer's use of a more sinister incarnation of Billy to convey instructions to the victims of his traps can be viewed as a manifestation of his unresolved anger over the incident, and with people he feels do not appreciate their lives, when his unborn baby was killed before having a life of its own.

Although never actually identified in the films, "Billy" is the name by which writers, directors, and members of the cast and crew refer to him in documentaries and interviews. The name was given to him by Australian creator James Wan, who is the director and co-writer of Saw. Some claim that the name is spelled "Billie", though Wan himself spells it "Billy".

The endurance and popularity of the Saw franchise has resulted in Billy becoming a popular culture icon, appearing in merchandise and other media.

== Characteristics ==
Billy is a male ventriloquist's dummy, as his jaw is movable to give the suggestion that he is talking; however, he is not used in the same manner, as the entire doll is frequently seen moving on its own. His face is white, with a protruding brow and cheeks that have red spirals painted on them. His red lips form a grin. His eyes are black with red irises, and his head is topped with black hair.

Billy is always depicted wearing a black tuxedo with a white shirt and gloves, red bow tie, and red handkerchief in the breast pocket. He also has red Mary Janes for shoes. In the short film, he is seen wearing a green bowler hat. He is often riding an old fashioned red tricycle. The only sound originating directly from him is an electronic cackle.

== Construction ==
According to Wan, the construction of the original puppet's face for Saw involved clay, papier-mâché, and black ping pong balls with the irises painted in for the eyes. Paper towel rolls were used internally. To make him move, the puppeteers pulled him along on a fishing line.

For Saw II, Billy was redesigned with mechanical features that could be manipulated by a remote control, including his unhinged jaw and his eyes.

For Saw III, the prop crew was given the original puppet, but found it unfit for work, as time had damaged it. Instead, they recreated Billy, using waterjet-cut foam for his body instead of fiberglass, equipped with plates to hold the puppet together and magnets to attach him to his tricycle. The back of his head was removable, to make it easier to slide animatronic pieces in.

For Saw IV, the prop crew made the body of waterjet-cut foam, held together by metal rods. They used strong magnets to make a flat rear surface for the puppet so it could be easily positioned on any metal surface. The mouth and resin-filled ping-pong ball eyes were moved by remote control.

== Appearances in films ==
=== Saw (2004) ===
In the first Saw film, Billy is seen on a television set by Amanda Young, telling her about the reverse bear trap that was hooked into her jaws, and explaining that the key to remove it is in the stomach of her "dead cellmate" (who is actually a heavily sedated man) lying in the room. After she disembowels the man and frees herself, Billy comes into the room on his tricycle to congratulate her.

Later, Adam Stanheight remembers seeing the puppet in his apartment when the lights went out. As he searches the dark rooms using his camera's flash, the puppet's eerie laugh rings through the apartment, and Adam hits it with a baseball bat until it stops.

When Detectives David Tapp and Steven Sing discover Jigsaw's latest hideout, they remove blankets from several covered items, one of which is Billy.

=== Saw II (2005) ===
In Saw II, Billy is seen on the screen at the beginning of the film, giving Michael Marks hints about the death mask he is wearing.

Later, when the detectives discover Jigsaw's new hideout, several officers walk up a caged staircase and are greeted by Billy, who wheels into sight at the top of the stairs on his tricycle and laughs. The cage then becomes electrified after one officer steps on a rigged step that breaks his legs.

=== Saw III (2006) ===
In a flashback in Saw III, Jigsaw is seen constructing Billy for Amanda's game, painting the puppet's face. Later, Billy appears on videotape to inform Troy and Detective Allison Kerry of their respective traps.

Billy is also used to remind Jeff Denlon of his dead son, by appearing next to his tricycle in the same position Jeff's son was in when he was killed. The puppet gives a mocking laugh until Jeff beats it into silence.

=== Saw IV (2007) ===
Billy is first seen in Saw IV when Officer Daniel Rigg awakes after being attacked in his apartment and rendered unconscious. Rigg opens his bathroom door, pulling a trigger wire from a TV set. Billy appears on the screen to explain Rigg's game. Upon leaving the room, Rigg is greeted by another message concerning his first test, referring to a woman Jigsaw deemed to be a criminal, who had been placed in a machine that would scalp her.

Agents Peter Strahm and Lindsey Perez later find Billy in a room in a school, sitting on a chair surrounded by candles. From a microcassette recorder hung around the puppet's neck, Perez learns that her partner will soon take the life of an innocent man (later revealed to be Jeff Denlon), and that her next move is critical. Billy's eyes begin turning to Perez. She leans in to hear this last, at which point Billy's face explodes, blowing shrapnel into her face and neck. Perez collapses into Strahm's arms as Billy laughs.

There is also a flashback of John Kramer giving an earlier, less menacing incarnation of Billy—a wooden doll, handmade by Kramer—to Jill Tuck as a gift for their unborn son Gideon. An interview with Tobin Bell revealed that this was the beginning of a storyline concerning Billy's origins, as that of his tricycle, to be explored in future Saw films.

=== Saw V (2008) ===
Billy appears in the opening sequence to tell Seth Baxter the rules of his game. It is unknown how Mark Hoffman created the videotape for this game. According to a list of potential Jigsaw victims, Seth was the third person tested after Cecil and Mark Wilson. In those tests, Jigsaw did not use a puppet. However, Jigsaw's testing spree had already begun beforehand, as shown during the events of Jigsaw, where Billy does appear.

Billy is also seen at the beginning of the tests designed for Ashley, Luba Gibbs, Charles, Brit, and Mallick.

=== Saw VI (2009) ===
In Saw VI, Billy appears on tape in the opening trap, which pits Simone and Eddie against each other. He also addresses William Easton during two of his four tests. He appears in William's second test hanging from a noose, and on videotape in the fourth test. Saw VI marks the first time Billy appears "in person" to deliver test details to victims.

=== Saw 3D (2010) ===
Billy appears in Saw 3D. He gives Brad and Ryan instructions for their trap in person (and is covered in Dina's blood when she is killed by the trap), does the same for Bobby Dagen's second test, and appears on videotape for the others. When Hoffman goes to his hideout after killing Jill Tuck with the reverse bear trap, multiple Billy heads can be seen. Billy's final appearance is in Hoffman's secret hideout at the end of the film; Hoffman blows it up, destroying Billy in the explosion.

=== Jigsaw (2017) ===
Billy appears in Jigsaw with illuminated red eyes. He appears on his tricycle with a letter around his neck with the word "Confess" written on it. He later appears on a videotape with his eyes illuminated, explaining to Ryan how he can save Anna and Mitch before they are buried alive in grain.

=== Spiral (2021) ===
A photograph of Billy is seen in Spiral, while the film's Jigsaw copycat killer and main antagonist, Billy Emmerson (portrayed by Max Minghella as an adult and Leonidas Castrounis as a child) is named in tribute to the puppet. Masquerading as police detective "William Schenk", Emmerson showcases his own new puppet "Mr. Snuggles", inspired by both Billy and the pig motif of the previous films.

=== Saw X (2023) ===
After Valentina failed her test, Amanda tases Mateo and restrains him on a wheelchair, putting an open mask around his head and an electrical circuit around his torso. Afterwards, Mateo was reeled into the warehouse lobby with the rest of the group and was set next to a television, showing a live feed of a camera above his head, where some hair is shaved off in preparation for Mateo's test. Moments later, Billy enters on his signature tricycle, reeling a tray of various surgery tools consisting of a scalpel, a bone drill, forceps, and other tools, along with the tape recorder with a "Play Me" message on the tape.

After Mateo fails his test, Billy appears next to Gabriela with a similarly marked "Play Me" tape around his neck ready for her game to commence.

== Other media ==
=== Non-canonical film appearances ===
- In Saw 0.5, the proof-of-concept short film prior to the original film being produced, Billy is seen on a television set by David, telling him about the reverse bear trap that was hooked into his jaws, and explaining that the key to remove it is in the stomach of his "dead cellmate" (who is actually a heavily sedated man) lying in the room. After he disembowels the man and frees himself, Billy comes into the room on his tricycle to congratulate him.
- In the 2006 film Scary Movie 4, Billy the Puppet appears in the film as the main antagonist. As a parody of the first two Saw films, he appears on a television screen to give instructions to Dr. Phil and Shaquille O'Neal, who are imprisoned in the bathroom, which is slowly filling with nerve gas.
- In the 2007 film Dead Silence, one of the puppets, who appears on the film's poster and wears the same outfit as Jigsaw's puppet, is named Billy. A graffiti-style painting of Billy's face can also be seen on a wall.
- In the 2011 film Insidious, there is a scene in which Josh (the father) is working late in the classroom and Billy is drawn in chalk on the blackboard behind his head. Underneath the drawing the number eight is shown, hinting at Jigsaw.
- In the 2018 film Upgrade, a graffiti-style painting of Billy's face can be seen on a wall.
- In the 2020 film The Invisible Man, a graffiti-style painting of Billy's face can be seen on a fence.

=== Comic ===
Billy can be seen in the corners of two panels near the beginning of Saw: Rebirth, foreshadowing John Kramer's eventual transformation into Jigsaw. The comic also marks Billy as one of John's creations at the toy factory where he worked, but this backstory was negated in Saw IV.

=== Dancing with the Stars ===
On season 30 of Dancing with the Stars, the Halloween/horror-themed episode featured Amanda Kloots performing while costumed as Billy. The show, however misidentified the character being portrayed as "Jigsaw".

=== Video games ===
Billy, voiced by Tobin Bell, appears throughout Saw: The Video Game, delivering hints and objectives to the player. He also featured prominently in marketing for the game. In the "Freedom" ending, Billy's reflection is seen on a TV when Tapp commits suicide. He returns in Saw II: Flesh & Blood, the sequel to the first game, also voiced by Tobin Bell. Billy repeats his role as in the first game, giving hints and clues to the player. The player can also collect small Billy dolls throughout the game, which require solving more complicated puzzles to obtain them; they are off of the main path, so the player does not have to get them. Saw II: Flesh & Blood is also the only time in the Saw franchise that he is actually called "Billy".

Billy the Puppet is featured on some cosmetic items, such as a car decal, in the popular free-to-play online game Rocket League from 19 October 2022 as part of the Halloween update titled "Haunted Hallows".

Billy is in the video game Dead by Daylight as a prop as part of the Saw chapter. He appears sitting on the character-specific prop boxes that appear in maps when the player chooses "The Pig", a licensed character from Saw (who is Amanda Young in her Jigsaw apprentice reliefs).

A costume of Billy was added to Call of Duty: Modern Warfare for Warzone operator Morte as a part of The Haunting of Verdansk event. A costume of Billy was added to Call of Duty: Mobile for operator Morte as a part of Season 9 Nightmare.

Billy was also added to Fortnite on October 8, 2024, as a cosmetic outfit, along with other cosmetic items referencing a trap and other theming from the Saw franchise, for "Fortnitemares" 2024.

=== Amusement park appearances ===
Billy appears on numerous screens throughout the queue line of "Saw – The Ride" at Thorpe Park, England, telling riders that they are not worthy of the life they have been given, implicating the ride to be one of Jigsaw's traps. He also appears on his tricycle at the start of the ride itself; the second dispatched car (two cars are dispatched one after the other) will stop while Billy gives a speech, informing the riders that there is no escape, and proclaiming, "Here's what happens when you lose", before allowing the train to pass – this regulates the distance between cars. He can also be seen before the car travels up the lift hill, appearing on a screen and saying "Game over", and at the end of the ride, where his head can be seen on a shelf covered with body parts.

The former "Saw Alive" maze, also in Thorpe Park, allowed parkgoers to be photographed with Billy.

In the U.S., Billy appears several times in the maze "Saw: Game Over" at Orlando Horror Nights at Universal Studios Florida.

=== In popular culture ===
Unlicensed Halloween masks based on Billy the Puppet

- Merchandise based on Billy the Puppet, including replica dolls, Halloween masks and costumes, have been released for consumer purchase.
- In the episode "Koi Pond" of the American television series The Office, Dwight Schrute dresses up as Billy for Halloween.
- Singer Nicki Minaj used a Billy mask as the face of "Nemesis" during her setlist while on the Britney Spears Femme Fatale Tour in 2011.
- Experimental pop artist Eric Millikin created a large mosaic portrait of Billy out of Halloween candy and spiders as part of his "Totally Sweet" series in 2013.
- In the Glee episode "The Hurt Locker, Part Two", Sue Sylvester uses a puppet resembling Billy on a tricycle to communicate with Kurt and Blaine.
