= Saw II =

2005 film by Darren Lynn Bousman

- Theatrical release poster
- Directed by: Darren Lynn Bousman
- Written by: Leigh Whannell; Darren Lynn Bousman
- Produced by: Gregg Hoffman; Oren Koules; Mark Burg
- Starring: Donnie Wahlberg; Franky G; Glenn Plummer; Beverley Mitchell; Dina Meyer; Emmanuelle Vaugier; Erik Knudsen; Shawnee Smith; Tobin Bell
- Cinematography: David A. Armstrong
- Edited by: Kevin Greutert
- Music by: Charlie Clouser
- Production company: Twisted Pictures
- Distributed by: Lions Gate Films
- Release date: October 28, 2005
- Running time: 93 minutes
- Country: United States
- Language: English
- Budget: $4 million
- Box office: $152.9 million

Saw II is a 2005 American horror film directed by Darren Lynn Bousman in his feature directorial debut, and written by Leigh Whannell and Bousman. It is the sequel to Saw (2004) and the second installment in the Saw film series. The film stars Donnie Wahlberg, Franky G, Glenn Plummer, Beverley Mitchell, Dina Meyer, Emmanuelle Vaugier, Erik Knudsen, Shawnee Smith, and Tobin Bell. In the film, a group of ex-convicts are trapped by the Jigsaw Killer (Bell) inside a house and must pass a series of deadly tests to retrieve the antidote for a nerve agent that will kill them in two hours.

Following the successful opening weekend of Saw, a sequel was quickly green-lit. Bousman was hired after previously having written a script that had a similar premise. Producer Gregg Hoffman received the script and shared it with his partners Mark Burg and Oren Koules, who determined that, with revisions, it could be the basis for Saw II. Whannell later provided rewrites for the script. The film received a larger production budget and was filmed in Toronto from May to June 2005.

Saw II was released in the United States by Lionsgate Films on October 28, 2005. It opened with $31.9 million and grossed $88 million in the United States and Canada. It has remained the highest grossing Saw film in those countries. Saw II was released to home media on February 14, 2006, and topped charts its first week. Bell was nominated for Best Villain at the 2006 MTV Movie Awards for his role. Saw II was followed by a sequel, Saw III, in 2006, and a prequel, Saw X, in 2023.

== Plot ==
Police informant Michael Marks awakens in a room with a spike-filled mask locked around his neck. Billy the Puppet on a screen says that the key to open the death mask has been surgically inserted behind his eye. He cannot bring himself to cut his eye, and is killed when the mask closes on his head.

At the scene of Michael's murder, Detective Allison Kerry finds a message for her former partner, Detective Eric Matthews. Eric joins Kerry and Officer Daniel Rigg in leading a SWAT team to the factory which produced the lock from Michael's trap. There, they apprehend John Kramer, the Jigsaw Killer, who indicates computer monitors showing eight people trapped in a house, including his only known survivor Amanda Young, Eric's son Daniel, and six other victims: Xavier, Jonas, Laura, Addison, Obi, and Gus. A nerve agent filling the house will kill them all within two hours, but John assures Eric that if he follows the rules of his own game, he will find Daniel again in a safe place. At Kerry's urging, Eric agrees to buy time for the tech team to arrive and trace the video signal. During their conversation, John reveals to Eric that his main motivation for his games was a suicide attempt after his cancer diagnosis, which led to a newfound appreciation for life; the games are intended to help his victims develop the same appreciation.

A microcassette recorder informs the group that antidotes are hidden throughout the house; one is in the room's safe, and the tape provides a cryptic clue. Xavier ignores a warning note and uses the key provided with the cassette on the door, which triggers a revolver through the peephole that kills Gus. Once the door opens, they search the house and find a basement, where Obi, who helped with abducting the other victims, dies in a furnace trap while trying to retrieve two antidotes. In another room, Xavier's test involves digging through a pit filled with syringes to retrieve a key to a steel door in two minutes, but he instead throws Amanda into the pit. She retrieves the key, but Xavier fails to unlock the door in time. The group eventually determines that each has been incarcerated before except Daniel. During his father's test, John reveals their affiliation to Eric, who was a corrupt police officer who framed his suspects in various crimes.

Xavier returns to the safe room and finds a number on the back of Gus's neck. After realizing the numbers are the combination for the safe, he kills Jonas and begins hunting the others. Laura succumbs to the nerve agent and dies, after finding the clue revealing Daniel's identity. Incensed by the revelation, Addison leaves on her own and finds a glass box containing an antidote, but her arms become trapped in the openings which are lined with hidden blades. Xavier enters the room and leaves her to die after reading her number. Amanda and Daniel find a tunnel from the first room leading to a dilapidated bathroom, finding Adam and Zep's bodies. (Note: As depicted in Saw.) After Xavier corners them, Amanda taunts him by implying that he will not learn his number because nobody will read it to him. Xavier responds by cutting off a piece of skin from the back of his neck to read his own number. Xavier charges them, and Daniel slits his throat with a hacksaw.

Having seen Xavier chasing his son, Eric assaults John and forces him to lead him to the house. The tech team tracks the video's source and while Rigg's team searches the house, Kerry realizes that the game took place days before they captured John and the footage they thought they had been seeing live was actually pre-recorded. The timer for Eric's game then expires and a safe in the factory unlocks to reveal Daniel inside, bound and breathing in an oxygen mask. Unaware of these events, Eric enters the house alone, reaches the bathroom, and is subdued by a pig-masked figure. He awakens shackled at the ankle to a pipe and finds a tape recorder left by Amanda, who reveals she had become John's accomplice after surviving her first trap and helped him set up Eric's test during the game at the house, intending to continue John's work after he dies. Amanda then appears and seals the door, leaving Eric to die as John hears his screams outside and smiles.

== Cast ==
- Tobin Bell as Jigsaw / John Kramer
- Shawnee Smith as Amanda Young
- Donnie Wahlberg as Eric Matthews
- Erik Knudsen as Daniel Matthews
- Franky G as Xavier
- Emmanuelle Vaugier as Addison
- Glenn Plummer as Jonas
- Beverley Mitchell as Laura
- Timothy Burd as Obi
- Dina Meyer as Kerry
- Lyriq Bent as Rigg
- Noam Jenkins as Michael
- Tony Nappo as Gus
- Kelly Jones as SWAT Member Pete
- Vincent Rother as SWAT Member Joe

== Production ==
=== Development and writing ===
The original teaser poster showing two bloody severed fingers that was banned by the Motion Picture Association of America

After the success of Saw's (2004) opening weekend, a sequel was quickly greenlit. Since director James Wan and writer Leigh Whannell were occupied with Universal Pictures' Dead Silence (2007), producers were searching for another writer and director. Around this time, music video director Darren Lynn Bousman had written The Desperate, which studios rejected for being too similar to Saw. A German studio offered to produce it for $1 million, but before that moved forward, Saw cinematographer David A. Armstrong suggested Bousman's script to producer Gregg Hoffman. Impressed, Hoffman contacted Bousman with interest in producing it. Initially concerned about accusations of plagiarism, Bousman learned instead that Hoffman and his partners, Mark Burg and Oren Koules, believed The Desperate could serve as the foundation for Saw II. Within two months, Bousman was brought to Toronto to direct the sequel. Saw II was also the final film produced by Hoffman, who died on December 4, 2005, shortly after its release.

Whannell revised Bousman's script, with input from Wan, to integrate it into the Saw universe while retaining the characters, traps, and deaths from The Desperate. Bousman said, "But you could read the script for The Desperate and watch Saw II, and you would not be able to draw a comparison". His original draft for The Desperate consisted of an X-rated violent film, but after difficulty in attracting studio interest due to its graphic violence, he revised it into an R-rated, which drew the attention of Lionsgate executives. Overall, the framework of The Desperate had a similar bleak, grotesque atmosphere and a twist ending, which is why the executives found parallels in the script's style. Wan and Whannell served as executive producers, and several crew members from the first film returned, including Armstrong, editor Kevin Greutert, and composer Charlie Clouser.

To preserve secrecy, only key cast and crew members involved in the film's ending were given the complete script; others received only the first 88 pages. Rewritten pages were shredded, and all members were required to sign confidentiality agreements prohibiting the release of plot details. Reportedly, "four or five" alternate endings were shot in order to keep the ending a surprise. Producer Hoffman stated in Fangoria that the filmmakers considered fans' feedback. For example, instead of only showing flashbacks of a character violently dying, they would allow it to unfold as it happened. This was in contrast to Saw, in which most of the violence was implied off-screen.

=== Casting ===
Tobin Bell reprised his role as Jigsaw from the first film, despite not being contractually obligated to return. Bell found it fascinating to return, but played the role like any of his, feeling the need to understand the character's perspective in order to portray him effectively. Shawnee Smith similarly returned to play Amanda Young, later noting that she had not anticipated reprising the role, as she did not expect the first film to be successful. Smith received $150,000 for her performance, with an additional $100,000 bonus contingent on the film grossing over $50 million. Bousman served as a stand-in for the hooded figure who places a key behind the character Michael Marks' eye, a role that some viewers speculated was Dr. Lawrence Gordon (Cary Elwes) from the first film, though Bousman later stated that this was not his intention.

Donnie Wahlberg was cast as Eric Matthews after expressing interest in both the character and the script. At sixteen years old, Erik Knudsen was cast as Eric's son, Daniel Matthews, in his first major feature film role. A fan of the first Saw film and the Scream franchise, Knudsen said he actively pursued the part. He would later star in Scream 4 (2011).

Beverley Mitchell was cast as Laura Hunter despite her dislike for horror films and her inability to watch the first film full until trying for the fifth time. She accepted the role as a personal challenge, noting the physical demands of portraying a character who is being poisoned and frequently coughs. Lyriq Bent initially auditioned for the role of Xavier Chavez but was cast instead as Daniel Rigg. According to Bent, the change was made to avoid the stereotype of casting an African-American actor as a drug dealer. Then the role was given to Henry Rollins, who originally accepted, but backed out due to scheduling conflicts. The role of Xavier was ultimately given to Franky G, though Bent later remarked that casting a Puerto Rican actor in the part was also stereotypical.

Bousman gave the actors freedom to change dialogue in the script. He said that 95% of the time, the actors went by the script, with about 5% being adlibs, which "made all of the difference in the world". Wahlberg was allowed to modify some pieces of dialogue, particularly in scenes between Eric Matthews and his son Daniel, as well as those with Jigsaw. For the former, he incorporated a line based on something he had personally said to his own son. For the latter, Wahlberg sought to emphasize Eric's desperation to sit with Jigsaw in order to save Daniel, which Bell supported. The two actors improvised several of their interactions on set, with Wahlberg often adding changes after the day's filming had concluded.

=== Filming and post-production ===
Saw II was produced on a budget of $4 million, compared to the little over $1 million budget of Saw. Some exterior shots of police vehicles at the industrial docklands next to the Toronto soundstage was filmed on April 29, 2005. Principal photography took place over 25 days at Toronto's Cinespace Film Studios from May 2, 2005, to June 6, 2005. The film was initially given 21 days to be shot. The nerve gas house scenes were shot in an abandoned Toronto warehouse, where the cast portraying Jigsaw's victims worked sixteen-hour days. Knudsen filmed while ill with the flu, noting that it suited his character's poisoned condition; he also continued with an on-set school tutor for two hours daily during production. The film's ending was shot from May 25 to 26. Music and sound were recorded in July, with the film locked on July 16 and completed by September 9. Visual effects were provided by C.O.R.E. Digital Pictures, with post-production services handled by Deluxe.

==== Trap designs ====
Production designer David Hackl spent three weeks building 27 sets on a single sound stage. The Billy puppet, originally created by Wan from household materials such as paper towel rolls and papier-mâché, was upgraded for the sequel with remote-controlled eyes and a servo-driven mouth. For the "Needle Pit" trap, in which Smith's character Amanda is thrown into a pit of syringes to find a key, the production team modified 120,000 syringes by replacing their metal tips with fiber optic points over a four-day period. As this amount was insufficient to fill the pit, styrofoam and other materials were added to create the appearance of additional needles. Syringes that appeared to pierce Smith's body were blunted and attached to padding beneath her clothing, and a prosthetic arm was used for certain shots.

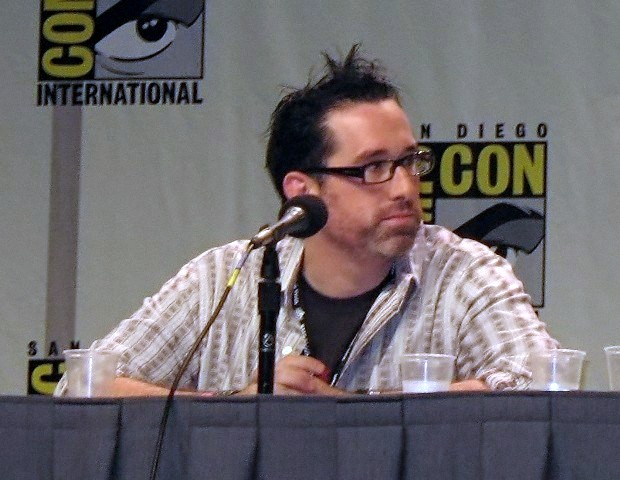
Saw II marked the directorial debut for Darren Lynn Bousman.

Bousman conceived the idea for the "Hand Trap", in which a character's hands become trapped inside a container. Hackl, property master Jim Murray, and art director Michele Brady developed the final design: a glass box suspended by chains from the ceiling that held a hypodermic needle containing an antidote, with two hand openings on the underside. When Emmanuelle Vaugier's character Addison places her hands inside, retractable razor blades closed around them, giving the appearance that any attempt to withdraw would cause severe injury. For safety, the prop was built with movable cuffs and blades that retracted away from the actress's hands. Hackl later noted that the character could have been avoided the trap entirely, as a visible lock and key on the opposite side of the box would have opened it.

The original idea for the "Furnace Trap" came from the house having been a crematorium at some point, but this would have involved turning the house into a funeral parlor, so it was instead decided that the furnace would be part of the house's boiler system. A computer model was created to help Bousman plan camera angles, and the set was constructed in three days from cement board and tin with removable sides and a top. This allowed Timothy Burd's character Obi to be filmed crawling inside. The furnace generated real flames, with a stunt performer coated in fire-retardant gel used in place of Burd for the sequences involving fire.

== Release ==
Saw II was released in the United States through Lionsgate Films, and in the United Kingdom through Entertainment Film Distributors on October 28, 2005. It was later released in Australia by Hoyts Distribution on November 17, 2005.

=== Marketing ===
The film's marketing budget was $2 million. Lionsgate held the second annual "Give Til It Hurts" blood drive for the Red Cross and collected a total of 10,154 pints of blood in 10 states.

The original teaser poster, which depicted two bloody severed fingers forming the Roman numeral II, was rejected by the Motion Picture Association of America (MPAA). Although the poster had briefly been released and circulated, the MPAA stated that it was not approved and deemed it unacceptable, prompting Lionsgate to remove it from their websites. The image was used instead for the film's soundtrack cover.

=== Soundtrack ===
The Saw II soundtrack was released by Treadstone Records on October 25, 2005. Johnny Loftus from AllMusic gave the soundtrack two and a half out of five stars, writing, "The remixer and occasional NIN member's music was overdone, mysterious, tense, and capably chilling, just like the horror-camp of the film itself." Mudvayne's song "Forget to Remember" was released as a single for both its original album and the soundtrack, and the video was also directed by Bousman.

=== Home media ===
Saw II was released on DVD, VHS, and Universal Media Disc in the United States through Lions Gate Home Entertainment on February 14, 2006, and is recognized as the last major studio horror film to receive a widespread VHS release before the format's discontinuation in Hollywood. The DVD and VHS sold 3 million units its first week, becoming the fastest selling theatrical DVD in Lions Gate's history. In rentals, Saw II topped the charts its first week bringing in $9.96 million in combined rentals, pushing Just Like Heaven ($5.96 million) to number two. Its second week, it placed first on rental charts with $5.29 million despite a 47% drop from its first week. The film grossed $45 million in home sales. On October 24, 2006, a DVD "Unrated Special Edition" was released, while an Unrated Blu-ray edition was also released with various special features on January 23, 2007. The film was released on 4K UHD in an Amazon-exclusive steelbook on October 21, 2025.

== Reception ==
=== Box office ===
Saw II opened with $31.7 million on 3,879 screens across 2,949 theaters. The three-day Halloween opening weekend set a Lionsgate record. It became at the time, the widest release for the distributor and one of the best opening weekends for a horror sequel. For its second weekend it fell 47% making $16.9 million. By Monday, the film's opening weekend performance helped boost Lionsgate's stock price by 8%.

Saw II opened in the United Kingdom with $3.8 million on 305 screens, 70% larger than the first installment. It opened in Japan on 67 screens with $750,000. Opening to $1.3 million on 173 screens it was the number one film in Australia. The film grossed $87 million in the United States and Canada and $60.7 million in other markets for a worldwide total of $147.7 million. In the United States and Canada, Saw II is the highest-grossing film of the Saw franchise.

=== Critical response ===
On the review aggregator website Rotten Tomatoes, 39% of 124 critics' reviews are positive, with an average rating of 4.9/10. The website's consensus reads: "Saw II is likely to please the gore-happy fans of the original, though it may be too gruesome for those not familiar with first film's premise." Metacritic, which uses a weighted average, assigned the film a score of 40 out of 100, based on 28 critics, indicating "mixed or average" reviews. Audiences polled by CinemaScore gave the film an average grade of "B+" on an A+ to F scale.

Robert Koehler of Variety wrote, "cooking up new Rube Goldberg torture contraptions isn't enough to get Saw II out of the shadow of its unnerving predecessor". Gregory Kirschling of Entertainment Weekly gave the film a B minus, saying "Saw II is just barely a better B flick than Saw" and that both films are "more clever and revolting than they are actually chilling". He praised Bell's performance as Jigsaw, saying "As the droopy-lidded maniac in the flesh, Tobin Bell is, for all the film's gewgaws, Saw II's sturdiest horror, a Terence Stamp look-alike who calls to mind a seedy General Zod lazily overseeing the universe from his evildoer's lair". He ended his review: "Where Saw II lags behind in Saw's novelty, it takes the lead with its smoother landing, which is again primed to blow the movie wide open, but manages a more compelling job of it than the original's cheat finish".

Kevin Crust of the Los Angeles Times called Saw II a "worthy follow-up to its grisly predecessor". He said the story was "much more focused on an endgame than the original film. There are fewer credibility gaps and there are plenty of reversals to satisfy fans". He criticized the use of numerous flashbacks, saying that it "rob[s] us of the pleasure of actually remembering for ourselves". Laura Kern, writing for The New York Times, said that Bousman "delivers similar hard-core, practically humorless frights and hair-raising tension, but only after getting past a shaky beginning that plays more like a forensics-themed television show than a scary movie" and called Greutert's editing "crafty". She called the sequel "more trick than treat" and that it "doesn't really compare to its fine predecessor—though it still manages to be eye-opening (and sometimes positively nauseating) in itself".

Empire's Alan Morrison gave the film three out of five stars. He said that the film improves upon Saw's "perverse fascination with Seven-style murders and brutally violent puzzles" and that Jigsaw's intellectual games make "Hannibal Lecter look like the compiler of The Sun's quick crossword". He ended his reviews saying, "Morally dubious it may be, but this gory melange of torture, terror and darkly humorous depravity appeals to the sick puppy within us all".

=== Accolades ===
Tobin Bell was nominated for "Best Villain" at the 2006 MTV Movie Awards for his role as Jigsaw, though the award went to Hayden Christensen for his role as Darth Vader in Star Wars: Episode III – Revenge of the Sith.

Award	Category	Recipient(s)	Result
Directors Guild of Canada	Outstanding Sound Editing - Feature Film	Rob Bertola; Tom Bjelic; Allan Fung; Mark Gingras; John Laing; Paul Shikata; John Douglas Smith	Nominated
Fangoria Chainsaw Awards	Best Villain	Tobin Bell	Won
MTV Movie Awards	Best Villain	Tobin Bell	Nominated
Saturn Award	Best DVD Special Edition Release	—	Nominated
Saturn Award	Best Horror Film	—	Nominated
Teen Choice Awards	Choice Movie: Scream	Donnie Wahlberg	Nominated
Teen Choice Awards	Choice Movie: Thriller	—	Nominated
