= Evolution Entertainment =

American entertainment management and film production company

- Industry: Entertainment
- Founded: 1998
- Founder: Mark Burg; Oren Koules; Gregg Hoffman
- Key people: Oren Koules (President 1999–2011); Michael Menchel (President 2011–present)
- Products: Motion pictures, television programs, entertainment management
- Subsidiaries: Twisted Pictures

Evolution Entertainment is an American independent entertainment management and film production company. The company was founded in 1998 by Mark Burg and Oren Koules and is best known for executive producing the Saw film series.

== History ==
Gregg Hoffman joined the company in 2003 as Head of Production. The box office success of the horror film Saw led to a distribution deal with Lionsgate and the formation of Twisted Pictures. Hoffman unexpectedly died on December 4, 2005.

In August 2005, the lead actor in Saw, Cary Elwes, filed a lawsuit against Evolution Entertainment, who were his managers at the time, stating he was promised a minimum of one percent of the producers' net profits of the film and did not receive the full amount. The case eventually was settled out of court and in 2010, Elwes reprised his role in Saw 3D.

In June 2011, after twelve years, Koules departed from the company; Burg purchased his 50% of the company. Burg chose CAA agent-turned-producer Michael Menchel as the new president.

The company's clients include Charlie Sheen and at one time Shawnee Smith and Danny Glover.

== Filmography ==
- Spoils of War (1994) (TV)
- Lockdown (2000)
- Good Advice (2001)
- John Q. (2002)
- Saw (2004)
- Saw II (2005)
- Saw III (2006)
- Catacombs (2007)
- Dead Silence (2007)
- Death Sentence (2007)
- Dallas Buyers Club (2013)
- The Con Is On (2018)
