= Jigsaw (2017 film) =

Film by the Spierig Brothers

- Theatrical release poster
- Directed by: The Spierig Brothers
- Written by: Josh Stolberg; Peter Goldfinger
- Produced by: Gregg Hoffman (Note: Although Hoffman died in 2005, he had received posthumous producer credit in films produced by Twisted Pictures starting with Saw III (2006), before receiving posthumous executive producer credit since Spiral: From the Book of Saw (2021)); Oren Koules; Mark Burg
- Starring: Matt Passmore; Callum Keith Rennie; Clé Bennett; Hannah Emily Anderson
- Cinematography: Ben Nott
- Edited by: Kevin Greutert
- Music by: Charlie Clouser
- Production company: Twisted Pictures
- Distributed by: Lionsgate Films
- Release date: October 27, 2017
- Running time: 92 minutes
- Country: United States
- Language: English
- Budget: $10 million
- Box office: $104.2 million

Jigsaw is a 2017 American horror film directed by the Spierig Brothers, and written by Josh Stolberg and Peter Goldfinger. It is a soft reboot and the eighth installment in the Saw film series, following Saw 3D: The Final Chapter (2010), and stars Matt Passmore, Callum Keith Rennie, Clé Bennett, and Hannah Emily Anderson, with Tobin Bell returning to his role as John Kramer / Jigsaw. The plot follows a group of people who find themselves forced to participate in a series of deadly "games" inside a barn. Meanwhile, the police investigate a new series of murders that fit the modus operandi of the eponymous Jigsaw Killer, who has been dead for almost a decade.

The previous film was deemed the final installment of the series before Lionsgate commissioned the production of Jigsaw from a pitch by Stolberg and Goldfinger. Early development began in 2013 with production officially starting in 2016 on a budget of $10 million.

The film was released by Lionsgate Films in the United States on October 27, 2017. Jigsaw received negative reviews and grossed a total of $104.2 million worldwide. It was followed by a standalone installment in the series, titled Spiral: From the Book of Saw, in 2021.

== Plot ==
Detectives Brad Halloran and Keith Hunt pursue Edgar Munsen, who claims that he must start a "game" in exchange for his own survival. He activates a remote trigger, and is then shot and collapses.

Five people – Mitch, Anna, Ryan, Carly, and an unconscious man – awaken inside a barn with buckets on their heads and chains around their necks. A tape recording from John Kramer explains that they must each sacrifice blood to survive before the chains pull them towards a wall of buzzsaws. Most of the group escapes by cutting themselves, except for the unconscious man, who awakens too late. Their next test reveals that Carly, a purse snatcher, accidentally caused the death of an asthmatic woman. To save the others from being hanged, she must inject herself with one of three needles – one an antidote to a poison in her system, another being saline, and the last one acid. She refuses, so Ryan injects her with all three, killing her but saving the others. In their third test, Ryan attempts to escape the barn, but his leg falls through loose floorboards, and is ensnared by wires. Another tape recorder reveals that he will be punished for breaking the rules and must pull a lever to be "set free." Anna and Mitch become trapped inside a silo, forcing Ryan to pull the lever and sever his leg to rescue them.

Halloran and Hunt investigate the discovery of corpses that appear to be the unconscious man and Carly, whose deaths fit John's modus operandi. Halloran becomes suspicious of pathologists Logan Nelson and Eleanor Bonneville. Eleanor reveals to Logan that she is a Jigsaw fangirl, but now fears this might incriminate her. Hunt spies and informs Halloran. Later, Edgar is abducted from the hospital.

In the barn, Mitch is revealed to have sold a faulty motorcycle to John's nephew, causing his death, and is tested by being lowered into a funnel with a spiral-shaped blade powered by a motorcycle engine inside. He attempts to stop the blade, but is ultimately killed.

Edgar's corpse is found inside John's grave. Halloran finds a corpse appearing to be Mitch in Eleanor's studio and calls for her and Logan's arrest. Logan convinces Hunt to let them go after saying that the bullet which hit Edgar was fired by Halloran, whom he and Eleanor suspect to be the new Jigsaw Killer. Eleanor deduces the game's location and she and Logan depart for the barn, with Halloran in pursuit.

In the barn, Anna and Ryan are shackled to pipes at opposite ends of a room. John confronts them and reveals that Anna asphyxiated her baby and framed her husband, who later committed suicide, and Ryan's drunken tomfoolery caused his friends' death in a car accident. Meanwhile, Hunt finds jigsaw-shaped pieces of flesh in Halloran's freezer.

For their final test, John leaves the two a shotgun loaded with one shell, saying it is their key to freedom. Halloran ambushes Logan and Eleanor at the barn. Anna tries to shoot Ryan, but the gun backfires, killing her. Ryan finds the now-destroyed keys among the debris; they had been hidden inside the shell. Eleanor escapes Halloran, while an unseen assailant drugs him.

Logan and Halloran awaken in collars rigged with laser cutters and are told to confess their sins. Halloran forces Logan to go first; Logan confesses to mislabeling John's X-rays years earlier, causing his cancer to go undiagnosed. Despite confessing, Logan is apparently killed. Halloran then admits to allowing criminals to walk free for personal gain and his collar deactivates. Logan is revealed to still be alive, and also the unconscious man from the first barn game, which took place ten years earlier. (Note: This means that the barn game occurred before the events of the first film.) Feeling that Logan should not die because of an honest mistake, John saved him and recruited him as his first apprentice. Logan reveals that he recreated the barn games, chose his victims from other criminals that Halloran let go, and framed Halloran as the new Jigsaw Killer as revenge for releasing Edgar, who killed Logan's wife. (Note: The corpses found by the police in the present died similarly to the original barn game's victims.) For breaking the rules by forcing Logan to go first, Halloran's collar is reactivated, slicing his head open. Logan says, "I speak for the dead," before shutting the door and leaving.

== Cast ==
- Matt Passmore as Logan Nelson
- Tobin Bell as Jigsaw / John Kramer
- Callum Keith Rennie as Detective Halloran
- Clé Bennett as Detective Keith Hunt
- Hannah Emily Anderson as Eleanor Bonneville
- Laura Vandervoort as Anna
- Paul Braunstein as Ryan
- Mandela Van Peebles as Mitch
- Brittany Allen as Carly
- Josiah Black as Edgar Munsen
- Edward Ruttle as Matt
- Michael Boisvert as Lee James
- Sam Koules as Melissa

== Production ==
=== Development and writing ===
The intention to end the Saw series was to split 2010's Saw 3D into two parts, but those plans were cancelled after Saw VI (2009) under-performed at the box office. After the intended conclusion, Lionsgate ceased making Saw films, while waiting to hear a pitch that they thought made it worthwhile to resurrect the series. In December 2011, while speaking with CNBC, Lionsgate Vice Chairman Michael Burns revealed that a new Saw film was being discussed and would eventually be made.

In August 2012, it was reported by horror film site Bloody Disgusting that Lionsgate was considering rebooting the film series. By November 2013, an eighth Saw film was in active development by Lionsgate. Jigsaw was conceived when writers Josh Stolberg and Peter Goldfinger, who had spent two years pursuing the opportunity to write a Saw entry, proposed their vision. Stolberg and Goldfinger, both longtime Saw fans, had been called by their agents that Twisted Pictures and Lionsgate were considering reviving the franchise and if they were interested in pitching an approach. According to Stolberg, Saw producers Mark Burg and Oren Koules called them months later and hired them to write the film, as unlike other takes they had heard from, their pitch contained one particular element they really liked.

The original pitch from Stolberg and Goldfinger took place in an oil derrick in the middle of the ocean, so when the players escaped from the room they were trapped in, they ended up finding themselves in the middle of the ocean with no way out. However, that element did not convince Lionsgate and the duo had to present several different pitches until they settled on the idea of telling the story through a time shift storyline like in previous Saw films, but in a different way. It was at that point that Jigsaw was greenlit, so Stolberg and Goldfinger spent the following months rewriting and polishing their script. Their first draft for the film originally took place outside entirely, taking place in a new world unusual to that from the franchise instead of the usual claustrophobic environment. The idea did not work out and they resolved to set the plot in a barn.

In July 2016, Michael and Peter Spierig signed on to co-direct the film. Charlie Clouser, who provided the score for all previous entries in the Saw series, returned to score Jigsaw. Clouser re-imagined the music of the Saw franchise, following the six-year hiatus between Saw 3D and Jigsaw. Clouser stated, "this will be an opportunity [for me] to re-imagine how [I] approach the score, and [I] will be trying a more stark, bold, and stripped-down approach that will be more in line with the strong vision that the Spierig brothers are bringing to the table". Clouser described the film as a "reinvention" of the series, opining that "the Spierig brothers can deliver a fresh take on the material that will establish a new story line and new characters that can carry the saga into the future". The directors further detailed their approach as being "Saw for 2017", and Michael Spierig explained, "It's perhaps not quite as vicious, and more fun. But it's still full of gore, that's for sure. It's got a really great mystery, and there are very interesting twists".

=== Casting and filming ===
In January 2017, Laura Vandervoort, Hannah Emily Anderson and Mandela Van Peebles were announced to be part of the cast. Vandervoort was drawn to playing Anna due to the character's flaws and for wanting to do her first thriller or horror film. Emily Anderson originally signed to play Eleanor Bonneville in three films, but other than Jigsaw, the latter two never materialized, as neither 2021's Spiral or 2023's Saw X continued the storyline direction set by Jigsaw. In March, Tobin Bell was confirmed to reprise his role as John Kramer "in some capacity". Other cast members, Brittany Allen, Callum Keith Rennie, Matt Passmore, Josiah Black, Shaquan Lewis, Michael Boisvert, and James Gomez were also confirmed.

With a production budget of $10 million, principal photography took place from early October into November 2016 in Toronto under the working title, Saw Legacy. In June 2017, Lionsgate confirmed the official title as Jigsaw.

== Release ==
On October 10, 2017, Lionsgate began the "Saw Blood Drive". The blood drive for the Red Cross became the series' tradition after the first film, where mobile blood stations are set up around the United States for fans to donate blood and receive a free ticket to see the respective film of that year. Lionsgate released eight promotional posters featuring "Nurses" Grae Drake, Dan Rockwell, Susanne Bartch, Nyakim Gatwech, Shaun Ross, Mosh, Mykie, and Amanda LePore.

Jigsaw was released in the United Kingdom on October 26, 2017, and in the United States theatrically on October 27, 2017. It was featured in IMAX screenings for the first week of its theatrical run. Jigsaw is the only film in the Saw franchise to have never been rated NC-17 by the Motion Picture Association of America, having obtained an R rating without cuts.

=== Home media ===
Jigsaw was released digitally on January 9, 2018, and on 4K Ultra HD Blu-ray, Blu-ray and DVD on January 23, 2018. The film's soundtrack was distributed digitally on October 27, 2017. The film grossed $7.7 million in home sales.

== Reception ==
=== Box office ===
In the United States and Canada, Jigsaw was released alongside Thank You for Your Service and Suburbicon, and was projected to gross around $20 million from 2,941 theaters in its opening weekend. It made $1.6 million from Thursday night previews at 2,400 theaters, just below the $1.7 million Saw 3D made from midnight screenings seven years prior, and $7.2 million on its first day. It went on to open to $16.64 million, finishing first at the box office but marking the second lowest debut of the franchise. In its second weekend the film dropped 61% to $6.56 million, finishing third behind newcomers Thor: Ragnarok and A Bad Moms Christmas. In its third weekend, the film dropped another 47% and made $3.43 million, finishing fifth. Jigsaw has grossed $38.1 million in the United States and Canada, and $64.9 million in other territories, for a worldwide total of $102.9 million.

=== Critical response ===
On the review aggregator website Rotten Tomatoes, 32% of 87 critics' reviews are positive, with an average rating of 4.7/10. The website's consensus reads: "Jigsaw definitely won't win many converts to the Saw franchise, but for longtime fans, it should prove a respectably revolting—if rarely scary—diversion." Metacritic, which uses a weighted average, assigned the film a score of 39 out of 100, based on 18 critics, indicating "generally unfavorable" reviews. Audiences polled by CinemaScore gave the film an average grade of "B" on an A+ to F scale, while PostTrak reported women under 25 (21% of the film's audience) and older males (30%) gave it a 76% and 70% overall positive score, respectively.

IGN gave the film a score of 4.5/10, writing "The good news is, Jigsaw is not the worst horror movie of the year. The bad news is, it's still bad enough that that's the good news...[It] doesn't capture what made the Saw franchise work in the first place." Darren French of Entertainment Weekly gave the film a "C", calling it disappointing and overly long. Bloody Disgusting gave the film two and a half out of five, saying the film "while being a fun ride, fails to justify its existence with a story that is overly familiar and a twist that doesn't live up to most of its predecessors".

Variety's Owen Gleiberman found the film "garishly rote" saying "For 92 minutes, it more or less succeeds in sawing through your boredom, slicing and dicing with a glum explicitness that raises the occasional tingle of gross-out suspense but no longer carries any kick of true shock value." Germain Lussier of Gizmodo largely panned the film saying "[it] is one of the better films in the franchise. Unfortunately, that's not saying much."
