= Spiral (2021 film) =

American film by Darren Lynn Bousman

- Theatrical release poster
- Directed by: Darren Lynn Bousman
- Written by: Josh Stolberg; Peter Goldfinger
- Produced by: Oren Koules; Mark Burg
- Starring: Chris Rock; Max Minghella; Marisol Nichols; Samuel L. Jackson
- Cinematography: Jordan Oram
- Edited by: Dev Singh
- Music by: Charlie Clouser
- Production company: Twisted Pictures
- Distributed by: Lionsgate Films
- Release date: May 14, 2021
- Running time: 93 minutes
- Country: United States
- Language: English
- Budget: $20 million
- Box office: $40.6 million

Spiral (also subtitled From the Book of Saw) is a 2021 American horror thriller film directed by Darren Lynn Bousman and written by Josh Stolberg and Peter Goldfinger. It serves as a spin-off and the ninth installment of the Saw film series, following Jigsaw (2017). The film stars Chris Rock, Max Minghella, Marisol Nichols, and Samuel L. Jackson, and follows police efforts to stop a Jigsaw copycat killer. The original creators of the series, James Wan and Leigh Whannell, as well as Rock and series veteran Kevin Greutert, serve as executive producers.

Talks of another Saw installment began after the release of the previous film, with Rock wanting to branch out into the horror genre. The project was officially announced in May 2019, with Rock polishing a script by Stolberg and Goldfinger. The rest of the cast joined in July, with filming taking place in Toronto through that month and August.

Scheduled to be released in May 2020, Spiral was delayed due to the COVID-19 pandemic, and was theatrically released in the United States on May 14, 2021, by Lionsgate Films. The film grossed a total of $40.6 million against a budget of $20 million, becoming the lowest grossing installment in the franchise, and received mixed reviews from critics. A tenth installment, Saw X, was released in September 2023.

== Plot ==
During a Fourth of July parade, off-duty Detective Marv Bozwick chases a thief down a sewer drain pipe. Attacked from behind by a figure wearing a pig mask, Bozwick awakens to find himself suspended by his tongue in an active subway tunnel and is given a choice via recorded message: tear out his tongue and live, or remain until the next train arrives, killing him. Unable to escape the trap in time, Bozwick is hit by the train and killed.

The next day, police Captain Angie Garza assigns Detective Zeke Banks a new partner, idealistic rookie William Schenk. Zeke and Schenk investigate Bozwick's death and Zeke recognizes the elaborate trap as the modus operandi of the now deceased Jigsaw Killer.

Meanwhile, homicide detective Fitch – who several years prior had ignored a backup call from Zeke, resulting in Zeke nearly getting killed – is abducted and placed in a trap where he must allow a device to rip his fingers off to avoid electrocution in a filling water basin; he also fails to escape and dies. Some officers begin to suspect that Zeke may be responsible, due to his history with Fitch. A box then arrives at the station, containing a pig puppet and a piece of Schenk's tattooed skin inside. A small vial inside the box directs the police to a butcher shop, which was previously a hobby shop that Zeke and his father, retired chief Marcus Banks, used to visit. Upon arriving, the team discovers a tape recorder and a skinned corpse, identified as Schenk. Deciding to track down the killer himself, Marcus travels to a warehouse, where he is abducted. Shortly afterwards, Garza is kidnapped, and placed in a trap in the precinct's cold storage where she has to sever her spinal cord on a blade to stop boiling wax flowing from a pipe onto her face. She fails to do so and dies from her injuries, moments before Zeke discovers her body.

While chasing a lead, Zeke is captured and wakes up at the warehouse, handcuffed to a pipe with a hacksaw nearby. He considers sawing off his arm, but successfully escapes using a loose bobby pin. He then discovers his former partner Peter Dunleavy, who was imprisoned when Zeke exposed a murder he committed, chained in place. In front of him is a large glass-crushing machine, which has been modified to hurl shrapnel at him. A tape recorder explains that Zeke can choose to either free him or leave him to die. Although Zeke attempts to save Dunleavy, he cannot get the key in time. Moving to another room, Zeke then finds Schenk, who is revealed to have faked his own death by using the skinned corpse of the thief who lured Bozwick into the tunnels, and has been the copycat all along. He explains that his last name is actually Emmerson, the son of Charlie Emmerson, who was the man Dunleavy killed because he had agreed to testify against a dirty cop. He also reveals that Marcus, during his time as chief, deliberately protected corrupt officers to "clean" the streets of crime more efficiently under Article 8.

Believing that Zeke can be an ally, Schenk presents him with a final test, revealing Marcus suspended above the floor and slowly being drained of blood. Schenk calls 9-1-1 and claims that he is a civilian being pursued by a shooter, resulting in the dispatch of a SWAT team. He hands Zeke a revolver with one cartridge, and offers him the choice to either shoot a target that will save Marcus but allow Schenk to escape, or to kill Schenk and let Marcus bleed to death. Zeke shoots the target to save his father, causing his restraints to loosen and lowering him to the ground, and then begins to fight Schenk. The SWAT team arrives and inadvertently triggers a tripwire, causing Marcus's restraints to yank him upward again. The movement reveals a gun affixed to Marcus's arm, leading the SWAT team to mistake him for the shooter and kill him. Zeke screams in despair as Schenk escapes.

== Cast ==
- Chris Rock as Detective Ezekiel "Zeke" Banks
- Max Minghella as Detective William Schenk
- Samuel L. Jackson as Marcus Banks
- Marisol Nichols as Captain Angie Garza
- Daniel Petronijevic as Detective Marv "Boz" Bozwick
- Richard Zeppieri as Detective Fitch
- Patrick McManus as Peter Dunleavy
- Ali Johnson as Officer Jeannie Lewis
- Zoie Palmer as Kara Bozwick
- Dylan Roberts as Sergeant Morgey
- K. C. Collins as Detective Drury
- Edie Inksetter as Detective Kraus
- Nazneen Contractor as Coroner Chada
- Thomas Mitchell as Detective O'Brien
- Chad Camilleri as Benny
- Christopher Ramsay as Crack Punk
- Morgan David Jones as Officer Barrett
- Nadine Roden as Officer Grant
- Frank Licari as Emmerson
- Genelle Williams as Lisa Banks
- Trevor Gretzky as Officer Pat Jones

== Production ==
=== Development ===
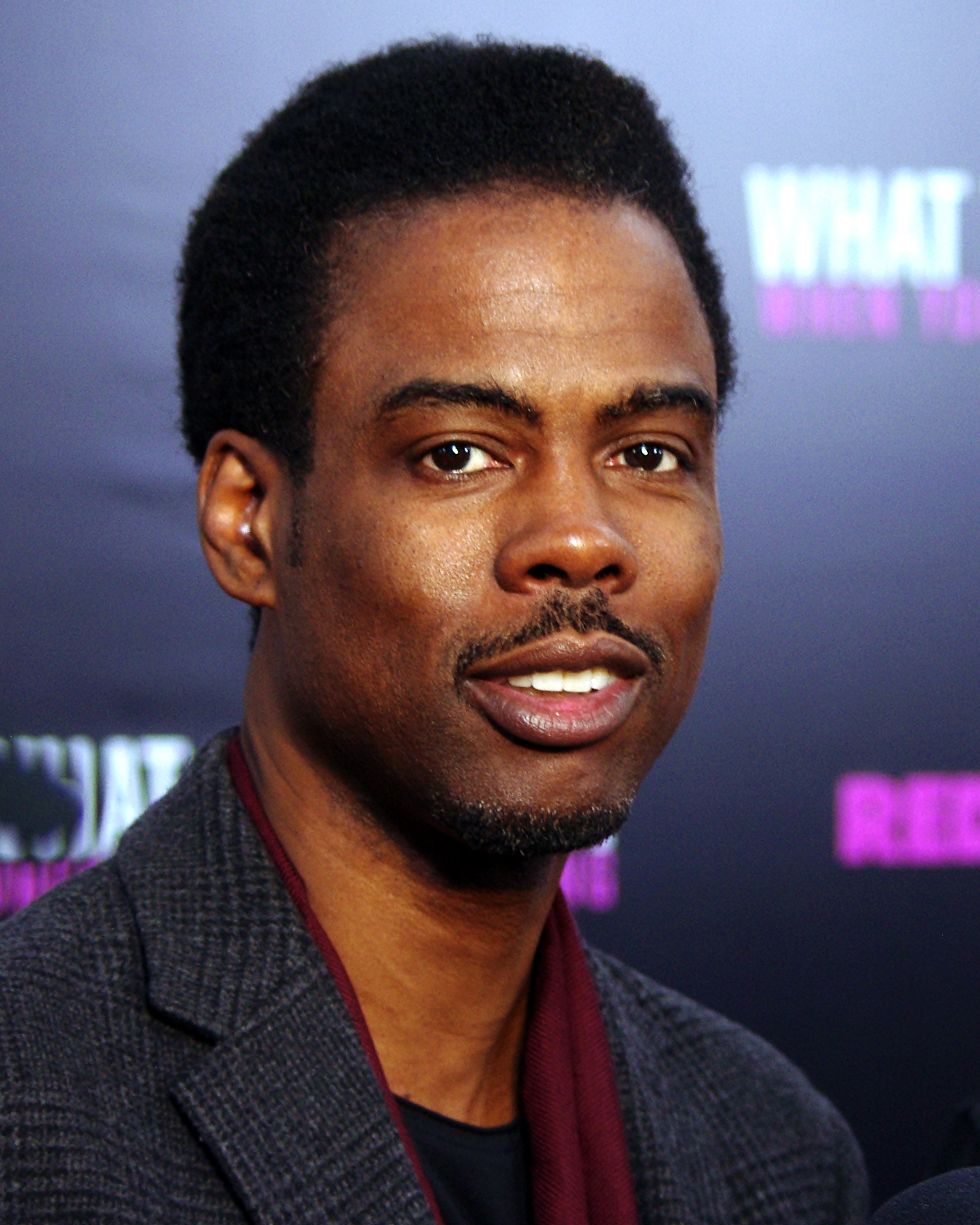
Chris Rock approached Lionsgate with his concept for Spiral as a way to reinvigorate the Saw franchise and his own career.

According to Chris Rock, the origins of Spiral came from a chance meeting with Lionsgate vice chairman Michael Burns at a friend's wedding in Brazil, as he felt doing something in the horror genre would be a new avenue to take in his career, though he planned to include some comedic elements in the film. Rock approached Lionsgate with his ideas of extending the Saw franchise, who became very interested in the concept. Lionsgate's CEO Joe Drake said that Rock's idea was "completely reverential to the legacy of the material while reinvigorating the brand with his wit, creative vision and passion for this classic horror franchise". In April 2018, Twisted Pictures was beginning development of a sequel with Jigsaw writers Josh Stolberg and Peter Goldfinger. Hannah Emily Anderson had originally signed on to reprise her Jigsaw role of Eleanor Bonneville in two more films, neither of which materialized.

Following the release of Jigsaw, Stolberg and Goldfinger had been pitching a new Saw film focused solely on John Kramer / Jigsaw rather than on any of his established apprentices to series veterans Mark Burg and Oren Koules, but then Burg and Koules called the duo to inform them about Rock's ideas for a new film, with Rock contacting them shortly afterwards to discuss his concept. Prior to that, other writers had pitched their ideas for the next Saw film to Lionsgate, but none of them had succeeded, while Stolberg and Goldfinger had come up with eight different versions for the film before Rock arrived and merged his idea with that of the duo. The producers had intended to tell another story focused on John Kramer / Jigsaw for the next Saw film, which would later materialize into Saw X, so when their plans were put on hold by Burns, they proposed to bring Spiral closer into the Saw universe by adding Jigsaw to the story, but Lionsgate convinced them to make Spiral a stand-alone movie. Burg and Koules instructed the duo to come up with a pitch for Rock. Stolberg and Goldfinger did so, and their pitch was approved by both Lionsgate and Rock, leading them to write their first draft, which was greenlit a week after being turned in. Rock aided Stolberg and Goldfinger during the writing process, rewriting the story when necessary.

An early iteration of the script had Rock's character related to Danny Glover's David Tapp from the first film. Stolberg and Goldfinger opted not to go in this direction as it "didn't pass the smell test".

Tobin Bell, who played John Kramer / Jigsaw in all previous Saw films, did not return in the film, making Spiral the first film in the franchise which does not physically feature Bell or feature the Jigsaw character beyond photographs. Director Darren Lynn Bousman explained that the film's killer is a "Jigsaw copycat", not the original Jigsaw, stating his intention to not recast Bell in the iconic role. Bell had expressed interest in returning as Jigsaw if the story delved into the origins of Billy the Puppet. Having Bell appear as Jigsaw in the film was widely discussed by Bousman and the crew until the last day of filming, but they felt that by bringing Bell back, the film would feel like the ninth installment of the Saw franchise rather than a separate film like it was intended to be. As the Jigsaw character was killed off in the third film, Bousman felt that previous films did a disservice by using flashbacks to bring Jigsaw into the story and he did not want to repeat the same mistake in Spiral nor to disrespect Bell's iconic performance. Bousman considered having Bell sing a Johnny Cash cover during the ending sequence. Bell recorded the cover, but Bousman dropped the idea as too gimmicky.

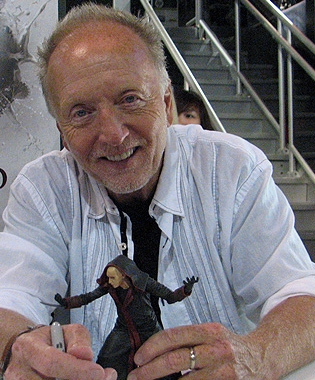
Spiral did not feature Tobin Bell reprising his usual role as Jigsaw, making it the first Saw film not to feature Bell, though he does briefly appear in archival photographs.

Although discussions took place after the first test screening and through post-production, Stolberg stated in an interview with Bloody Disgusting that Jigsaw was never included in any draft for the screenplay of Spiral, as the filmmakers felt that including him would alter the "DNA" of the story they were trying to achieve and their desire to take the franchise in a new direction. Stolberg also felt that due to the franchise's timeline, any possible connection between John Kramer and William Schenk/the Spiral Killer would have been when the latter was still a child. Stolberg and Goldfinger proposed a post-credits scene in which Kramer bonds with a young Schenk after the murder of the latter's father, possibly giving him the puppet he later uses as the Spiral Killer. While this would create a relationship like those depicted in the first seven films, it was ultimately decided to abandon the idea.

In a further effort to differentiate between the two storylines, Bousman decided to replace Billy the Puppet with a new puppet, Mr. Snuggles. Deeming Bell's voice as too iconic, filmmakers feared that reusing it for Mr. Snuggles could have raised questions about the relationship between the killers; an early draft actually featured Jigsaw's voice, which would then be revealed as a digitally altered version. The story originally had all the speeches taken from past recordings of Jigsaw's voice using words in a different order. The filmmakers struggled to find a new voice for the killer to replace Bell's, testing numerous voices of women, children, and men. They finally settled on the computer-generated voice heard in the final film only two days before finishing the sound mix.

=== Pre-production ===
On May 16, 2019, the film entered pre-production. Former series director Darren Lynn Bousman returned to helm the film, along with Burg and Koules as producers. Rock was involved as an executive producer, in addition to writing the story treatment. The original Saw creators James Wan and Leigh Whannell, along with Daniel Heffner, joined Rock as executive producers. Stolberg and Goldfinger were confirmed as scriptwriters. With the announcement, Rock stated, "I've been a fan of Saw since the first film in 2004. I am excited by the opportunity to take this to a really intense and twisted new place". Bousman, who refused to direct another entry after the fourth film, turned down the chance to direct a Broadway show in New York City after Rock insisted he direct the film. Burg and Koules said that Rock's treatment of Saw was comparable to what Eddie Murphy had done for buddy cop films in 48 Hrs., giving the Saw series a "completely fresh perspective". Likewise, Bousman stated that in comparison to previous entries, Spiral included less violence and gore, expressing the conviction that the gore and violence were the gimmick for him back when he started working in the Saw films, but that both elements now serve the story, which focuses more on character, tension and fear. Stolberg also confirmed that the ninth installment would exist in the same canon as the previous eight films, and would not be a reboot or a direct sequel to Jigsaw.

=== Casting ===
Rock starred as Detective Zeke Banks. The character was conceived by Rock, Stolberg and Goldfinger from the conversations they had before writing the screenplay, with Rock musing about what he would do if he were the original Saw protagonist Dr. Lawrence Gordon and be forced to cut off his own foot, until they decided that it would be interesting if Rock played a cop ostracized by his colleagues.

Samuel L. Jackson agreed to play Chief Marcus Banks out of interest in performing a situation he had never done before, like the climactic scene where his character is hung up like a marionette. Marisol Nichols was cast as Captain Angie Garza; the role was originally written for a male actor, but the producers ultimately gave Nichols the role who, despite being a Saw fan, chose to not revisit the previous films but instead watched David Fincher's Seven in preparation for the role. In an attempt to pursue an acting career on film and television after years acting on stage, coming across with the film, Patrick McManus first auditioned for the role of Detective Marv Bozwick, but was called back to play Peter Dunleavy while Dan Petronijevic was cast as Bozwick.

A fan of both horror and buddy-cop films, Max Minghella took on the role of William Schenk as he yearned of starring in a movie with simple story-telling like the buddy cops of his youth like 48 Hrs., and when he read the script, he felt it was that along with a Saw film.

=== Filming ===
On a production budget of $20 million, principal photography began on July 8, 2019, in Toronto, Ontario. Rock provided rewrites while on set, and completely overhauled the introduction scene for his character. According to Bousman, a scene featuring a trap had to be cut from the film due to it being "too gnarly". On August 28, 2019, filming officially wrapped up. During post-production, editing was completed by Dev Singh.

== Music ==
=== Soundtrack ===
The soundtrack EP of Spiral was created by rapper 21 Savage. It was released day-and-date with the film on May 14, 2021, through Slaughter Gang and Epic Records. It features guest appearances from 21 Savage's cousin, Young Nudy, Real Recognize Rio, 21 Lil Harold, SG Tip, Millie Go Lightly, Gunna, and Young Thug. It was produced by Kid Hazel, OZ, Turbo, and Taurus. The opening and title track of the EP was released as the lead single alongside its official music video on April 30, 2021.

== Release ==
=== Theatrical ===
Spiral was originally scheduled to be released by Lionsgate Films on October 23, 2020. In July 2019, it was moved up to May 15, 2020. As a result of the COVID-19 pandemic, the film's release was delayed to May 21, 2021, taking the spot previously scheduled for John Wick: Chapter 4. It was later moved up a week, to May 14, 2021, as theaters began reopening. According to Bousman, the film was given an NC-17 rating from the Motion Picture Association 11 times before finally cutting enough scenes to get an R rating.

=== Home media ===
Spiral was released on PVOD on June 1, 2021, in the United States and Canada. The film streamed on Starz beginning October 8, 2021, in the United States. On July 13, 2021, the 4K Ultra HD, Blu-ray and DVD were released. The film grossed $4.4 million in home sales.

== Reception ==
=== Box office ===
In the United States and Canada, Spiral was released against Those Who Wish Me Dead, Profile, and Finding You, and was projected to gross $10–15 million from 2,811 theaters in its opening weekend. The film made $3.7 million on its first day (including $750,000 from Thursday night previews), lowering projections to $9 million. It went on to debut to $8.8 million, topping the box office (the sixth time for the series) but marking the lowest opening weekend of the franchise. Audiences reported on were 56% male and 75% under the age of 35, with a positive response appearing more frequently along the East Coast of the United States. It remained in first place the following weekend, dropping 48% to $4.6 million.

Spiral grossed $23.2 million in the United States and Canada, and $17.3 million in other territories, for a worldwide total of $40.6 million.

=== Critical response ===
On the review aggregator website Rotten Tomatoes, 39% of 233 critics' reviews are positive, with an average rating of 5.1/10. The website's consensus reads: "Spiral: From the Book of Saw suggests an interesting new direction for the Saw franchise, even if the gory sum is rather less than its parts." Metacritic, which uses a weighted average, assigned the film a score of 40 out of 100, based on 32 critics, indicating "mixed or average" reviews. Audiences polled by CinemaScore gave the film an average grade of "B−" on an A+ to F scale, while PostTrak reported 63% of audience members gave it a positive score, with 43% saying they would definitely recommend it.

In his review for Variety, Owen Gleiberman wrote that the film "takes an unexpected twist or two but considering that [...] it's a thriller pegged to the issue of police immorality, the film confronts that theme in a weirdly untopical, almost garishly generic way." William Bibbiani of the TheWrap wrote: "The screenplay captures the grizzled-cop-movie tone and draws some memorable characters, but the storyline is rote, the mystery is frustratingly predictable, and the imaginative deaths are less imaginative than ever. Spiral sacrifices entertainment value for respectability and in the process doesn't quite achieve either."

From The Hollywood Reporter, Lovia Gyarkye found Spiral to be "a legitimately frightening, if unevenly paced, detective thriller" while also criticizing its screenplay for failing to convey the "potential tensions" between the father-and-son relationship of its main characters. The San Francisco Chronicle's Mick LaSalle gave praise to the acting and Spiral's "straightforward but compelling premise," but commented that the voice of the mysterious killer sounded like Kermit the Frog."

Benjamin Lee of The Guardian gave the film one star out of five and criticized its ending, writing that he felt it was "rushed and half-assed" and "stupidly written and worst of all increasingly dull". Brian Tallerico, in his one-and-a-half-star review for RogerEbert.com, praised the cast but gave the film negative marks for its tone and Darren Lynn Bousman's direction, calling it "downright illegible" for its lack of tension, story, and progression in the plot. Lena Wilson, of The New York Times, praised the opening scene but found it to be the only good part of the film, concluding "the premise is disingenuous at best and [...] fearmongering at worst. Like Jigsaw offering one of his facile riddles, this film is not as clever as it thinks it is."

Siddhant Adlakha of IGN gave the film a 3 out of 10 rating, stating that "A sequel that hopes to court Saw fans and mainstream audiences alike, Spiral: From the Book of Saw is likely to alienate them both. It's a hollow imitation of the series, unable to meet its most basic visual and narrative expectations. It's also a bad film in general, which tries to tell a socially relevant story that it can't seem to handle." He also criticized the film for its lack of connection to the Saw franchise, stating that "Spiral: From the Book of Saw is barely a Saw film, delivering only briefly on the visceral thrill of mutilation, and on none of the series' other tenets. It's also the most artless, tactless version of what it plays like instead: a rejected pilot episode for a rote police procedural."

Katie Rife of The A.V. Club said that "It's not a waste of a concept, exactly. But it's not the reinvention that the franchise needs, either. Rock's involvement brings some new blood to Spiral, but after a promising start, the film just becomes a pretty okay Saw movie with some bigger names than usual—one whose jaundiced lighting and procedural storytelling recall David Fincher's Se7en more than anything. If the game was to see if a fresh take on a long-running franchise could survive being sliced and diced by the sequel machine, consider it lost."

Chris Evangelista of /Film gave the film a negative review, stating that "Spiral blunders through its central mystery without grace or style, or even much thought. Even the death traps are weirdly uninspired." He acknowledged the film had potential, saying that "The most frustrating thing about Spiral is that there is a better, smarter movie lurking beneath all the nonsense here; all the quick cuts and speed ramping scenes; all the terrible dialogue that's shouted at full volume. Spiral is ultimately a film about corrupt, and even murderous cops suddenly facing a reckoning, and that sort of material has the potential to be both subversive – for a Hollywood movie, at least – and timely" but said that "Spiral is almost maddening in how little it seems to care about any of this. It simply wants to shed a lot of blood – and it does."

Producer Mark Burg would acknowledge in 2023 that the reception of Spiral would lead him and Oren Koules to go back and make the Saw sequel they had been planning to make before they put it on hold for Spiral, which would become Saw X. Burg has stated that he is proud of how Spiral turned out, but it wasn't a box office success as they had expected.

== Sequel ==
In April 2021, a sequel film, titled Saw X, was confirmed to be in development with Twisted Pictures. However, Bousman stated that it was a premature announcement that surprised him and the film's producers. He said, "Just because we made Spiral doesn't mean Saw ceases to exist. Just because Spiral is here, that doesn't mean there won't be a Saw IX. This is not the ninth film in the Saw franchise. There easily could be a Saw IX that follows Jigsaw. I think they're waiting to see how Spiral goes and how audiences respond to determine what happens next." Josh Stolberg confirmed the script was finished in December of that same year. In July 2023, a tenth Saw film was confirmed to be released on September 29, 2023, with Kevin Greutert to direct. In October 2022, Tobin Bell was set to reprise the role of John Kramer / Jigsaw for the film.
