= Fight 'N' Jokes =

1997 video game

- Developer: Nasty Brothers Software
- Publishers: Evolution Entertainment (MS-DOS); Mental Drink (Switch)
- Platforms: MS-DOS, Windows, Nintendo Switch
- Release: MS-DOS: EU: 1997; Switch: WW: 3 January 2022; AU: 4 January 2022; Windows: WW: 16 May 2024
- Genre: Fighting
- Mode: Single-player

Fight 'N' Jokes is a 2D fighting video game developed by Nasty Brothers Software and published om 1997 by Evolution Entertainment in Italy for MS-DOS. The game has a cartoon theme with ten characters across ten stages. Development started as an attempt by Italian developers and brothers Antonio and Cosimo Lattanzio to create a video game reminiscent of Mortal Kombat. The game was remastered and republished worldwide by Mental Drink for the Nintendo Switch in 2022 and Windows in 2024.

== Gameplay ==
Gameplay screenshot

Fight 'N' Jokes is a fighting video game in which players select one of ten cartoon characters and challenge the others in bouts within the time limit across ten locations. Each character has a special move that can be performed using button combinations, requiring an energy meter to fill to use. There are six different modes, including a Training Mode to practice the abilities of the selected character.

== Development ==
Fight 'N' Jokes was developed by Italian studio Nasty Brothers Software, formed by programmer Antonio Lattanzio and his brother Cosimo, with art by Francesco Lupo and Antonio Capuano. Antonio stated that he began programming at the age of 14 in 1990, and Fight 'N' Jokes was developed using Assembly with the intent to create a game similar to Mortal Kombat. The game was republished for the Nintendo Switch in 2022, and Microsoft Windows in 2024 by New Zealand publisher Mental Drink.

== Reviews ==
Reception

Review scores
Publication	Score
Giochi per il mio computer	4/5
K	890/1000
PC Game Parade	80%

Describing the game as a "welcome novelty", Giochi per il mio computer praised the humor and ironic tone of Fight 'N' Jokes, its accessibility and graphic design reminiscent of comic strips, whilst considering it lacked attack options. PC Game Parade favorably compared the game to Super Street Fighter II, and found it fun to play and well-executed. However, the publication felt that whilst the visuals were aesthetically appealing, the game was not innovative and its lack of three-dimensional graphics and vertical scrolling made it old-fashioned in nature.
