= Saw: Genesis =

Upcoming multiplayer horror video game

- Developers: Broken Mirror Games; Anshar Studios
- Publisher: Bloober Team
- Series: Saw
- Platform: Windows
- Release: WW: 2026; (early access)
- Genre: Horror
- Mode: Multiplayer

Saw: Genesis is an upcoming multiplayer horror game developed by Broken Mirror Games and Anshar Studios, and published by Bloober Team. It is based on the Saw horror franchise and is planned for release in early access for Windows. The game was announced at Summer Game Fest in June 2026.

== Gameplay ==
Saw: Genesis is a first-person, three-versus-one asymmetric multiplayer horror game. Three players control the Accused, while a fourth player controls the Judge. Matches take place on procedurally generated maps. At the start of each match, the Judge can see the full map layout immediately, while the Accused must explore the maze to remove the fog of war.

The Accused must work together to complete challenges, collect keys and escape a maze of traps before time runs out. If caught in a trap, an Accused player may be forced to sacrifice a body part or depend on teammates for rescue. These injuries affect the rest of the match, with damage to different body parts changing the player's ability to move, fight or solve puzzles.

The Judge manipulates the trial indirectly using traps, perks and other tools, but is physically vulnerable and cannot directly overpower the Accused; the Accused can overwhelm the Judge if they find weapons and stay together. The Judge can use hidden corridors, a noise-detection map, hallucinogenic gas, paralysing toxins and an Accomplice who can drag the Accused into traps.

== Premise ==
Saw: Genesis is set in the aftermath of World War I, about a century before John Kramer became the serial killer known as Jigsaw and before the events of the Saw films. The story centres on the Judge, an early figure whose methods foreshadow the philosophy later associated with Jigsaw, and the Accused, who are forced into trials based on escape, sacrifice, and survival.

== Development and release ==
A Steam page for Saw: Genesis appeared before its Summer Game Fest presentation on June 5, 2026, in what GameSpot described as an "apparently premature" reveal. The game was subsequently shown during the event the same day. Saw: Genesis is developed by Broken Mirror Games and Anshar Studios, with Bloober Team publishing and Lionsgate involved through the Saw franchise partnership. Tobin Bell, who has portrayed John Kramer / Jigsaw since the first Saw film in 2004, will appear in the game.

Bloober Team chief executive Piotr Babieno said the multiplayer format was intended to extend the franchise's focus on moral choices into a shared setting driven by player interaction and consequence. Lionsgate executive Erika N. Ewing described the game as a new chapter for the franchise built around traps, time pressure and life-or-death choices.

The game is planned to launch first in early access for Windows in 2026. A full release date has not been announced.
