= Twisted Pictures =

American independent production company

- Type: Division
- Industry: Film; Television
- Founded: 2004; 22 years ago
- Founders: Gregg Hoffman; Oren Koules; Mark Burg
- Headquarters: Los Angeles, U.S.
- Products: Saw (2004–2025)
- Parent: Evolution Entertainment
- Divisions: Twisted Television

Twisted Pictures is an American production company and a division of Evolution Entertainment that specializes in horror and thriller films. The company was founded by Evolution's Gregg Hoffman, Oren Koules and Mark Burg in 2004. The company is known for producing the Saw franchise.

== History ==
In 2004, following Evolution Entertainment's pre-release success with Saw, its executives, Mark Burg, Oren Koules, and Gregg Hoffman, founded Twisted Pictures as Evolutions's division for films in the horror genre. Saw was released in October 2004 and became a success at the box office, leading Lionsgate Films, the film's distributor, to sign a nine-picture deal with Twisted Pictures in November that year. Twisted Pictures has since produced all installments in the Saw franchise. Carl Mazzocone served as president for four years.

In June 2007, the company formed a joint venture with RKO Pictures to remake four films from the latter's library, namely Five Came Back (1939), I Walked with a Zombie (1943), The Body Snatcher (1945), and Bedlam (1946). None of these films ever came to fruition.

In October 2009, Twisted Pictures landed a deal with The Texas Chainsaw Massacre's rights holders, Bob Kuhn and Kim Henkel, after discussions with the film's production company, Platinum Dunes, fell apart. The deal was stated to cover multiple pictures.

In June 2025, Blumhouse entered talks to acquire the Saw franchise from Twisted Pictures, potentially giving co-creators James Wan and Leigh Whannell greater creative control following the merger of Wan's company, Atomic Monster, with Blumhouse. The transaction was made in late June.

== Feature films ==
Year	Film	Director	Distributor	Budget	Gross
2004	Saw	James Wan	Lionsgate	$1.2 million	$103.9 million
2005	Saw II	Darren Lynn Bousman	Lionsgate	$4 million	$147.7 million
2006	Saw III	Darren Lynn Bousman	Lionsgate	$10 million	$164.9 million
2007	Dead Silence	James Wan	Universal Pictures	$20 million	$22.2 million
2007	Catacombs	Tomm Coker; David Elliot	Lionsgate	—N/a	—N/a
2007	Saw IV	Darren Lynn Bousman	Lionsgate	$10 million	$139.4 million
2008	Vlog	Joshua Butler	Anchor Bay Entertainment	—N/a	—N/a
2008	Saw V	David Hackl	Lionsgate	$10.8 million	$113.9 million
2008	Repo! The Genetic Opera	Darren Lynn Bousman	Lionsgate	$8.5 million	$188,126
2009	Saw VI	Kevin Greutert	Lionsgate	$11 million	$68.2 million
2010	The Tortured	Robert Lieberman	IFC Films	—N/a	—N/a
2010	Saw 3D	Kevin Greutert	Lionsgate	$20 million	$136.2 million
2014	Catch Hell	Ryan Phillippe	Lionsgate	—N/a	—N/a
2016	Havenhurst	Andrew C. Erin	Brainstorm Media	—N/a	—N/a
2017	Jigsaw	The Spierig Brothers	Lionsgate	$10 million	$104.2 million
2021	Spiral: From the Book of Saw	Darren Lynn Bousman	Lionsgate	$20 million	$40.6 million
2022	End of the Road	Millicent Shelton	Netflix	—N/a	—N/a
2023	Saw X	Kevin Greutert	Lionsgate	$13 million	$125.3 million
2025	Trust	Carlson Young	Republic Pictures	—N/a	$304,014
2026	Twisted	Darren Lynn Bousman	Republic Pictures	—N/a	—N/a

== Television series ==
Year	Series	Creator(s)	Network
2012–2014	Anger Management	Bruce Helford	FX

== See also ==
- Atomic Monster
- Blumhouse Productions
- Dark Castle Entertainment
- Ghost House Pictures
- Gold Circle Films
