= Oren Koules =

American film producer

- Born: January 31, 1961 (age 65); La Grange Park, Illinois
- Occupations: Entrepreneur, film producer, professional sports executive
- Spouse: Shereen Arazm

Oren Koules (born January 31, 1961) is an American entrepreneur and film producer. He is the co-founder of Evolution Entertainment and produced the Saw film series as well as the CBS television series Two and a Half Men. A former professional hockey player, Koules later purchased the Tampa Bay Lightning where he was also the team's Governor and Chief Executive Officer.

Koules later sold his rights the Saw franchise and its library in 2025. He also signed a multi-picture deal with Paramount Pictures. The first film under the deal, Trust, was released in August 2025.

== Early life ==
Koules was born and raised in La Grange Park, Illinois, a suburb of Chicago. As a child, he took figure skating lessons where he developed an interest in playing ice hockey, later dropping out of high school to pursue a career as a professional hockey player.

== Career ==
=== Early career; hockey and commodities ===
Koules competed in the Western Hockey League from 1979 to 1982. During his career he played for six different teams, including the Medicine Hat Tigers, Portland Winter Hawks, Brandon Wheat Kings, and Spokane Flyers. His final year he played for the Hampton Roads Gulls, Virginia Raiders, and Saginaw Gears. His best year was in 1980 with the Spokane Flyers when he scored 28 goals with 45 assists for a total of 73 points.

Koules was not drafted by an NHL team, but he attended two tryout camps for his hometown Chicago Blackhawks. After his hockey career, Koules became a commodities trader at the Chicago Mercantile Exchange in 1983. He was one of the youngest members on the floor and eventually purchased a full membership to the Exchange. He sold his seat and left the exchange in good standing in 1991.

=== Film career and sports ===
Upon arriving in Hollywood, Koules was introduced to former Los Angeles Times reporter, Dale Pollock, and the two formed Peak Productions soon after. Together, they produced films like Mrs. Winterbourne and Set It Off. The early success of Peak Productions led Koules to a job as the Senior Vice President of Production at Paramount Pictures. In 1998, Koules founded Evolution Entertainment along with film producer Mark Burg, with their first major production being the 2002 thriller film John Q. starring Denzel Washington. In 2001, Koules became the owner of the Helena Bighorns, a Junior A hockey team, also purchasing the Helena Ice Area.

In 2003, Koules and Mark Burg saw a seven-minute teaser of a film written by Australian screenwriters, Leigh Whannell and James Wan, and agreed to produce the film. The film would later become the original Saw film that was released in 2004. The budget for the film was $1.2 million with $1 million of the funding coming direct from Koules and Burg. Production was done under a newly formed subsidiary of Evolution Entertainment called Twisted Pictures. The film turned in the Saw franchise with the sequel released in 2005 and the franchise making $420 million at the box office by 2007. Evolution Entertainment was also responsible for the production of Two and a Half Men starting in 2003.

In 2007, Koules started his pursuit to purchase the Tampa Bay Lightning from Palace Sports and Entertainment. In 2008, he agreed to purchase the team through OK Hockey LLC, an investment group he controlled, for $206 million. The group sold the team to Jeffrey Vinik, a minority owner in the Boston Red Sox, for $160 million in 2010. During his time as co-owner of the Lightning, he was the team's Governor and Chief Executive Officer.

In June 2011, Koules sold his ownership in Evolution Entertainment, but continued to own and oversee the Saw franchise and Two and a Half Men. The Saw franchise has grossed more than $1 billion from the box office as of 2021.

Koules produced the 2021 horror film Spiral: From the Book of Saw, a spin-off and the ninth installment of the Saw film series. He also produced the 2023 horror film Saw X which served as both a direct sequel to Saw (2004) and a prequel to Saw II (2005). Koules partnered with his son Miles Koules in 2022 to form the film production company Koulest Productions.

Koules signed a multi-picture deal with Paramount Pictures through Twisted Pictures in 2024. The first film, Trust, began production by both Oren and Miles in 2024. The film was released in August 2025. In 2025, Koules also sold his rights to the Saw franchise and its library to Blumhouse Productions.

== Personal life ==
Koules married talent agent Risa Shapiro in 1994. Their son Miles played professional ice hockey for numerous years. Koules and Shapiro separated in 2005 and eventually divorced in 2007. In 2008, Koules married Shereen Arazm, a businesswoman and restaurateur. They met by happenstance on a flight from Toronto, where Arazm is originally from, to Los Angeles where Koules was filming Saw II. The pair have two daughters together, Sam and Neve.

== Filmography ==
He was a producer in all films unless otherwise noted.

=== Film ===
Year	Film	Credit	Notes
1996	Mrs. Winterbourne		
1996	Set It Off		
1999	Black and White	Executive producer	
2000	Lockdown		
2001	Good Advice		
2001	Diary of a Sex Addict		Direct-to-video
2002	Run Ronnie Run!		
2002	John Q.		
2002	Malevolent	Executive producer	
2003	Dumb and Dumberer: When Harry Met Lloyd		
2003	Love Don't Cost a Thing	Executive producer	
2004	Saw		
2005	Saw II		
2006	Saw III		
2007	Dead Silence		
2007	Catacombs		
2007	Saw IV		
2008	Repo! The Genetic Opera		
2008	Saw V		
2008	Vlog	Executive producer	
2009	Saw VI		
2010	Lottery Ticket		
2010	The Tortured		
2010	Saw 3D		
2013	Jake Squared	Executive producer	
2017	Jigsaw		
2021	Spiral: From the Book of Saw		
2023	Saw X		
2025	Trust		

As an actor

Year	Film	Role	Notes
2004	Saw	Dead Cellmate	Uncredited
2007	Saw IV	The Man	

Thanks

Year	Film	Role
TBA	He Helped Me: A Fan Film from the Book of Saw	Special thanks

=== Television ===
Year	Title	Credit	Notes
2003	The Three Amigos		Documentary
2004	The Casino		
2005−06	Love, Inc.	Executive producer	
2008	Vlog	Executive producer	
2003−12	Two and a Half Men	Executive producer	

== Awards and recognition ==
Koules has been nominated and won numerous awards. He received three Primetime Emmy Award nominations for his work on Two and a Half Men and won both a TV Land Award for his work on the same and a ShoWest Award for his work on the Saw film series.

=== Primetime Emmy Awards ===
Year	Category	Nominated work	Result	Ref.
2006	Outstanding Comedy Series	Two and a Half Men	Nominated	
2007	Outstanding Comedy Series	Two and a Half Men	Nominated	
2008	Outstanding Comedy Series	Two and a Half Men	Nominated	

=== TV Land Awards ===
Year	Category	Nominated work	Result	Ref.
2009	TV Land Future Classic Award	Two and a Half Men	Won	

=== ShowWest Awards ===
Year	Category	Nominated work	Result	Ref.
2007	ShoWest Award of Excellence in Producing	Saw film series	Won	

Sporting positions
Preceded by Bill Davidson	Tampa Bay Lightning owner 2008–2010	Succeeded by Jeff Vinik
