= Mark Burg =

American film producer

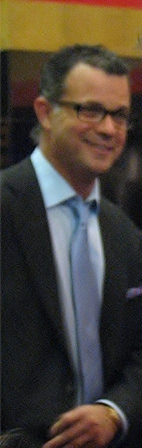
- Burg at the Saw 3D premiere on October 28, 2010
- Occupations: Film producer, manager, actor
- Years active: 1986–present
- Spouse: Shainaz Donnelly

Mark Burg is an American film producer, manager and actor. He is the co-founder of Evolution Entertainment and produced the Saw film series as well as the CBS television series Two and a Half Men.

== Biography ==
Burg graduated from the Roy H. Park School of Communications at Ithaca College in 1981.

In the 1990s, Burg worked for Island Pictures and Palm Pictures, producing such films as Basketball Diaries (1995), The Sandlot, The Cure, and Strictly Business (1991). In 1998, Burg founded Evolution Entertainment along with his producing partner Oren Koules.

In 2003, Burg and Oren Koules saw a seven-minute teaser of a film written by Australian screenwriters, Leigh Whannell and James Wan, and agreed to produce the film. The film would later become the original Saw film that was released in 2004. The budget for the film was $1.2 million with $1 million of the funding coming direct from Burg and Koules. Production was done under a newly formed subsidiary of Evolution Entertainment called Twisted Pictures. The film turned in the Saw franchise with the sequel released in 2005 and the franchise making $420 million at the box office by 2007. Evolution Entertainment was also responsible for the production of Two and a Half Men starting in 2003.

Burg became the sole-owner of Evolution Entertainment in 2011, buying out co-founder Oren Koules. He also became an advisor for Forest Road, a special-purpose acquisition company, in 2020. Burg also co-produced Spiral, the ninth installment from the Saw Franchise. The franchise has grossed more than $1 billion from box office and retail sales as of 2021.

== Filmography ==
He was a producer in all films unless otherwise noted.

=== Film ===
Year	Film	Credit	Notes
1987	Can't Buy Me Love	Co-producer	
1988	Bull Durham		
1991	Toy Soldiers	Executive producer	
1991	Strictly Business	Executive producer	
1993	The Sandlot	Executive producer	
1994	Airheads		
1995	The Cure		
1996	Don't Be a Menace to South Central While Drinking Your Juice in the Hood	Executive producer	
1996	The Little Death	Executive producer	
1996	Eddie		
1997	B.A.P.S.		
1997	How to Be a Player		
1998	The Gingerbread Man	Executive producer	
1998	Body Count		
1999	Black and White	Executive producer	
2000	Lockdown		
2001	Good Advice		
2001	Diary of a Sex Addict		Direct-to-video
2002	Run Ronnie Run!		
2002	John Q.		
2002	Malevolent	Executive producer	
2003	Love Don't Cost a Thing		
2003	Dude... We're Going to Rio	Executive producer	Direct-to-video
2004	Saw		
2005	Saw II		
2006	Saw III		
2007	Dead Silence		
2007	Catacombs		
2007	Saw IV		
2008	Repo! The Genetic Opera		
2008	Saw V		
2008	Vlog	Executive producer	
2009	Saw VI		
2010	Lottery Ticket		
2010	The Tortured		
2010	Saw 3D		
2013	Texas Chainsaw 3D	Executive producer	
2013	Ain't Them Bodies Saints	Executive producer	
2013	Grace Unplugged	Executive producer	
2014	Catch Hell	Executive producer	
2016	Havenhurst	Executive producer	
2017	9/11	Executive producer	
2017	Jigsaw		
2018	Traffik	Executive producer	
2019	The Intruder		
2019	American Skin		
2021	Spiral: From the Book of Saw		
2023	Saw X		
2026	Twisted	Producer	

As an actor

Year	Film	Role	Notes
1991	Toy Soldiers	Himself 'Mouthwash' Buyer	Uncredited

Miscellaneous crew

Year	Film	Role
1988	Waxwork	Production consultant

Thanks

Year	Film	Role
1993	Boxing Helena	The producer wishes to thank
1995	The Basketball Diaries	Special thanks
1998	Let's Talk About Sex	Very special thanks
2017	Atomic Blonde	The producers wish to thank
TBA	He Helped Me: A Fan Film from the Book of Saw	Special thanks

=== Television ===
Year	Title	Credit	Notes
2003	The Three Amigos		Documentary
2004	The Casino		
2005−06	Love, Inc.	Executive producer	
2008	Vlog	Executive producer	
2008-2010	Scream Queens	Guest judge	Reality television, 2 episodes
2011	Comedy Central Roast of Charlie Sheen	Co-executive producer	Television special
2003−12	Two and a Half Men	Executive producer	
2012−14	Anger Management	Executive producer	
2017	Hit the Road	Executive producer	
2017−20	Loudermilk	Executive producer	

== Awards and recognition ==
Burg has been nominated and won numerous awards. He received three Primetime Emmy Award nominations for his work on Two and a Half Men and won both a TV Land Award for his work on the same and a ShoWest Award for his work on the Saw film series.

=== Primetime Emmy Awards ===
Year	Category	Nominated work	Result	Ref.
2006	Outstanding Comedy Series	Two and a Half Men	Nominated	
2007	Outstanding Comedy Series	Two and a Half Men	Nominated	
2008	Outstanding Comedy Series	Two and a Half Men	Nominated	

=== TV Land Awards ===
Year	Category	Nominated work	Result	Ref.
2009	TV Land Future Classic Award	Two and a Half Men	Won	

=== ShowWest Awards ===
Year	Category	Nominated work	Result	Ref.
2007	ShoWest Award of Excellence in Producing	Saw film series	Won	
