= Saw (franchise) =

Horror media franchise

- Created by: James Wan; Leigh Whannell
- Original work: Saw (2004)
- Owners: Lionsgate Studios; Blumhouse Atomic
- Years: 2004–present

Print publications
- Comics: Saw: Rebirth (2005)

Films and television
- Films: Saw (2004); Saw II (2005); Saw III (2006); Saw IV (2007); Saw V (2008); Saw VI (2009); Saw 3D (2010); Jigsaw (2017); Spiral (2021); Saw X (2023)
- Short films: Full Disclosure Report (2005); The Scott Tibbs Documentary (2006)
- Television series: Scream Queens (2008)

Games
- Video games: Saw (2009); Saw II: Flesh & Blood (2010); Saw: Genesis (2026)

Miscellaneous
- Theme park attraction: Saw – The Ride

Saw is an American horror media franchise created by James Wan and Leigh Whannell. It began with the eponymous 2004 film and quickly became a worldwide pop culture phenomenon. It has expanded into various films and other media, including television series, video games, comic books, music, theme park attractions, and merchandising including toys, masks, and clothing. Saw is the fifth highest-grossing horror franchise of all-time, and was named by Guinness as "the most successful horror franchise in history" in 2010.

The series follows the fictional serial killer John "Jigsaw" Kramer and his accomplices. John is introduced in Saw and is further developed in the subsequent films. Rather than killing his victims directly, he places them in life-threatening situations known as "tests" or "games", subjecting them to physical or psychological torture in an attempt to test their will to survive and, in his view, rehabilitate them.

In 2003, Wan and Whannell made a short film to help pitch a feature film concept, after having the original script written for several years. After numerous unsuccessful attempts to receive funding in their home country of Australia, Wan and Whannell traveled to the United States, after several producers expressed interest in the project. It was ultimately successful, and, in 2004, the first installment debuted at the Sundance Film Festival and was released theatrically that October by Lionsgate. After its immensely successful opening weekend, the first of many sequels was immediately green-lit. Five directors (Note: The directors of Jigsaw consisted of twin brothers Michael and Peter Spierig, known colloquially as The Spierig Brothers, who just count as one director in the total.) have worked on the series, the first four were their directorial debuts: James Wan, Darren Lynn Bousman, David Hackl, Kevin Greutert and The Spierig Brothers; while Whannell, Bousman, Patrick Melton, Marcus Dunstan, Josh Stolberg, and Peter Goldfinger have written the screenplays. Both creators remain with the franchise as executive producers.

The film series has been a box office success, grossing more than $1 billion from box office and retail sales. The first, sixth, and ninth films received mixed reviews, while the second, third, fourth, fifth, seventh, and eighth films received negative reviews. The tenth film received generally positive reviews from critics, becoming the only film in the franchise to do so. An eleventh film produced by Twisted Pictures was scheduled for September 2025 but was cancelled in March 2025, another eleventh film helmed by Blumhouse is in active development as of 2026.

== Films ==
Film	U.S. release date	Director	Screenwriter(s)	Story by	Producers
Saw	October 29, 2004	James Wan	Leigh Whannell	James Wan & Leigh Whannell	Gregg Hoffman, Oren Koules and Mark Burg
Saw II	October 28, 2005	Darren Lynn Bousman	Leigh Whannell and Darren Lynn Bousman	Leigh Whannell and Darren Lynn Bousman	Gregg Hoffman, Oren Koules and Mark Burg
Saw III	October 27, 2006	Darren Lynn Bousman	Leigh Whannell	James Wan & Leigh Whannell	Gregg Hoffman, Oren Koules and Mark Burg
Saw IV	October 26, 2007	Darren Lynn Bousman	Patrick Melton & Marcus Dunstan	Patrick Melton & Marcus Dunstan and Thomas Fenton	Gregg Hoffman, Oren Koules and Mark Burg
Saw V	October 24, 2008	David Hackl	Patrick Melton & Marcus Dunstan	Patrick Melton & Marcus Dunstan	Gregg Hoffman, Oren Koules and Mark Burg
Saw VI	October 23, 2009	Kevin Greutert	Patrick Melton & Marcus Dunstan	Patrick Melton & Marcus Dunstan	Gregg Hoffman, Oren Koules and Mark Burg
Saw 3D	October 29, 2010	Kevin Greutert	Patrick Melton & Marcus Dunstan	Patrick Melton & Marcus Dunstan	Gregg Hoffman, Oren Koules and Mark Burg
Jigsaw	October 27, 2017	The Spierig Brothers	Josh Stolberg & Peter Goldfinger	Josh Stolberg & Peter Goldfinger	Gregg Hoffman, Oren Koules and Mark Burg
Spiral	May 14, 2021	Darren Lynn Bousman	Josh Stolberg & Peter Goldfinger	Josh Stolberg & Peter Goldfinger	Gregg Hoffman, Oren Koules and Mark Burg
Saw X	September 29, 2023	Kevin Greutert	Josh Stolberg & Peter Goldfinger	Josh Stolberg & Peter Goldfinger	Gregg Hoffman, Oren Koules and Mark Burg

=== Future ===
In September 2023, producers Mark Burg and Oren Koules stated there were tentative plans for future installments in the Saw series, dependent on the reception and success of Saw X (2023). Later that month, Josh Stolberg—co-writer of Jigsaw (2017), Spiral (2021), and Saw X—announced that there were active plans for an eleventh installment. Both Burg and Koules stated that the mid-credits scene of Saw X was intended to set up a future film which would again include the character Mark Hoffman. The character Cecilia was intentionally left alive for a possible sequel to expand her character upon. The following month, Kevin Greutert—director of Saw VI (2009), Saw 3D (2010), and Saw X—told The Hollywood Reporter that, "there are so many directions we could go, but for me, there's no obvious one coming out of this film. I really wanted it to feel like a kind of final send-off for the Jigsaw character, but never say never". In October 2024, Tobin Bell was officially confirmed by Los Angeles Times to be reprising once again his role as John Kramer / Jigsaw in the film, teasing that the character "isn't done" yet and there is more to learn about him.

In December, Lionsgate confirmed Saw XI on their Instagram account, with a release date of September 27, 2024. However, in April 2024, the film was delayed to September 26, 2025. Koules stated the film would likely be a direct sequel to Saw X. Greutert was set to direct. In March 2025, it was reported that work on the film had stalled. Patrick Melton and Marcus Dunstan, who wrote the fourth to the seventh film, turned in a draft of the script in mid-2024. However, in August later that year, Oren Koules confirmed it was cancelled due to "[having] a difference of opinion [with Mark Burg], and we couldn't resolve it."

In June 2025, Blumhouse Productions bought Twisted Pictures' stake in the franchise, with Lionsgate still being involved. Franchise co-creator James Wan will be creatively involved with a new Saw film for the first time since Saw III (2006). In October 2025, Jason Blum announced Wan's creative return to the franchise, expressing a desire that Wan's creative outlook returns to the franchise.

On September 25, 2026, it was announced that an eleventh film is in development with Mike P. Nelson directing along with James Wan and Leigh Whannell producing.

== Short films ==
Title	U.S. wide-release date	Director	Writer	Producer
Saw	October 18, 2003	James Wan	Leigh Whannell	Darren McFarlane
Full Disclosure Report	October 31, 2005	—N/a	—N/a	—N/a
The Scott Tibbs Documentary	October 24, 2006	Kelly Pancho	Kelly Pancho & Mark Atkinson	Kelly Pancho

Saw, often referred to as Saw 0.5, is a 2003 short film that served as a promotional tool in pitching a feature-length version to Lionsgate. It is included on the second disc of the uncut DVD release of Saw. It has also been released alone, and on the Saw Trilogy DVD containing Saw Uncut Edition, Saw II Special Edition, and Saw III Director's Cut, packaged with a limited-edition 3D puppet-head box version of Billy the Puppet.

A mockumentary short film, Full Disclosure Report, was released in 2005 as part of the Saw: Uncut DVD-release. The story takes place between the first and second films and features reporters trying to figure out who Jigsaw is and discussing his victims. The short film marks the first appearance of detective Eric Matthews, before his appearance in Saw II.

Another mockumentary short film, The Scott Tibbs Documentary, was released in 2006 as part of the Saw II: Unrated Special Edition DVD-release. The story takes place between the second and third films, where Adam Stanheight's friend Scott Tibbs, leader of the rock band "Wrath of the Gods", is filming a documentary about Jigsaw and his victims.

Saw: Rebirth is originally a comic book released by IDW in 2005 and tells the story of the events that spurred the transformation of John Kramer into Jigsaw. Later, it was released as a short film in the form of a motion comic on the original Saw II website.

== Television ==
In 2008 and 2010, VH1 channel aired the reality show Scream Queens, produced by Joke Productions and Lionsgate Television. The show chronicles a group of unknown actresses competing for a role in the Saw VI and Saw 3D.

In April 2021, Lionsgate Television chairman Kevin Beggs announced in an interview with Deadline Hollywood that Lionsgate TV was in early talks on a television series adaptation or continuation of the film Spiral.

== Recurring cast and characters ==
List indicators

This section includes characters who have appeared in more than two films in the series.

- An empty grey cell indicates the character was not in the film.
- ^{A} indicates an appearance through archival footage or audio.
- ^{C} indicates a cameo role.
- ^{P} indicates an appearance in onscreen photographs.
- ^{S} indicates an appearance through use of special effects.
- ^{V} indicates a voice-only role.
- ^{Y} indicates a younger version of the character.

Character	Saw	Saw II	Saw III	Saw IV	Saw V	Saw VI	Saw 3D	Jigsaw	Spiral	Saw X
Character	2004	2005	2006	2007	2008	2009	2010	2017	2021	2023
John Kramer Jigsaw	Tobin Bell	Tobin Bell	Tobin Bell	Tobin Bell	Tobin Bell	Tobin Bell	Tobin Bell	Tobin Bell	Tobin Bell^{P}	Tobin Bell
Amanda Young	Shawnee Smith	Shawnee Smith	Shawnee Smith	Shawnee Smith^{A}	Shawnee Smith^{A}	Shawnee Smith	Shawnee Smith^{A}			Shawnee Smith
Lawrence Gordon	Cary Elwes	Cary Elwes^{V}	Body double^{C}	Mentioned	Mentioned	Mentioned	Cary Elwes			
Adam Stanheight	Leigh Whannell	Leigh Whannell^{V}^{S}	Leigh Whannell		Mentioned	Leigh Whannell^{A}	Leigh Whannell^{A}^{V}^{S}			Leigh Whannell^{S}
Zep Hindle	Michael Emerson	Michael Emerson^{V}^{S}	Michael Emerson^{A}^{S}		Mentioned		Michael Emerson^{A}^{S}			Michael Emerson^{S}
David Tapp	Danny Glover		Danny Glover^{A}		Danny Glover^{A}^{P}					
Steven Sing	Ken Leung		Ken Leung^{A}		Ken Leung^{P}					
Allison Kerry	Dina Meyer	Dina Meyer	Dina Meyer	Dina Meyer	Dina Meyer^{P}					
Eric Matthews		Donnie Wahlberg	Donnie Wahlberg	Donnie Wahlberg	Donnie Wahlberg^{A}^{P}					
Daniel Rigg		Lyriq Bent	Lyriq Bent	Lyriq Bent	Lyriq Bent^{A}^{P}					
Daniel Matthews		Erik Knudsen	Erik Knudsen^{A}	Erik Knudsen^{P}	Body double^{C}		Erik Knudsen^{A}			
Obi Tate		Timothy Burd	Timothy Burd^{C}		Timothy Burd^{C}		Timothy Burd^{A}		Timothy Burd^{P}	
Xavier		Franky G	Franky G^{C}		Franky G^{C}		Franky G^{A}			
Addison		Emmanuelle Vaugier	Emmanuelle Vaugier^{A}	Emmanuelle Vaugier^{A}	Emmanuelle Vaugier^{A}				Emmanuelle Vaugier^{P}	
Mark Hoffman			Costas Mandylor	Costas Mandylor	Costas Mandylor	Costas Mandylor	Costas Mandylor			Costas Mandylor^{C}
Jill Tuck			Betsy Russell	Betsy Russell	Betsy Russell	Betsy Russell	Betsy Russell	Mentioned		
Jeff Denlon			Angus Macfadyen	Angus Macfadyen^{C}	Angus Macfadyen^{A}	Angus Macfadyen^{A}	Mentioned			
Lynn Denlon			Bahar Soomekh	Bahar Soomekh^{A}	Bahar Soomekh^{A}	Bahar Soomekh^{A}	Bahar Soomekh^{A}			
Corbett Denlon			Niamh Wilson	Niamh Wilson	Niamh Wilson	Niamh Wilson^{C}				
Peter Strahm				Scott Patterson	Scott Patterson	Scott Patterson^{A}				
Lindsey Perez				Athena Karkanis	Athena Karkanis^{A}	Athena Karkanis				
Dan Erickson					Mark Rolston	Mark Rolston				
Brit					Julie Benz	Mentioned				
Mallick					Greg Bryk	Mentioned	Greg Bryk			
Pamela Jenkins					Samantha Lemole	Samantha Lemole	Mentioned			
William Easton						Peter Outerbridge	Peter Outerbridge^{P}			

== Additional crew and production details ==
Film	Crew/Detail					
Film	Composer	Cinematographer	Editor(s)	Production company	Distributing company	Running time
Saw	Charlie Clouser	David A. Armstrong	Kevin Greutert	Twisted Pictures	Lionsgate Films	103 min
Saw II	Charlie Clouser	David A. Armstrong	Kevin Greutert	Twisted Pictures	Lionsgate Films	93 min
Saw III	Charlie Clouser	David A. Armstrong	Kevin Greutert	Twisted Pictures	Lionsgate Films	108 min
Saw IV	Charlie Clouser	David A. Armstrong	Brett Sullivan; Kevin Greutert	Twisted Pictures	Lionsgate Films	92 min
Saw V	Charlie Clouser	David A. Armstrong	Kevin Greutert	Twisted Pictures	Lionsgate Films	92 min
Saw VI	Charlie Clouser	David A. Armstrong	Andrew Coutts	Twisted Pictures; A Bigger Boat	Lionsgate Films	90 min
Saw 3D	Charlie Clouser	Brian Gedge	Andrew Coutts	Twisted Pictures; A Bigger Boat; Serendipity Productions	Lionsgate Films	90 min
Jigsaw	Charlie Clouser	Ben Nott	Kevin Greutert	Twisted Pictures; Serendipity Productions; A Bigger Boat	Lionsgate Films	92 min
Spiral	Charlie Clouser	Jordan Oram	Dev Singh	Twisted Pictures; Serendipity Productions; Dahlstar LLC	Lionsgate Films	93 min
Saw X	Charlie Clouser	Nick Matthews	Kevin Greutert	Twisted Pictures; Galaxy 8 Entertainment; Serendipity Productions	Lionsgate Films	118 min

== Series overview ==
=== Story ===
Saw story chronology (Note: According to Entertainment Weekly, Jigsaw is first in the timeline because it takes place both before and after the events of Saw. Though released later, it serves as both a prequel and sequel, making it the starting point of the story.)
- Saw (2004)
- Saw X (2023)
- Saw II (2005)
- Saw III (2006)
- Saw IV (2007)
- Saw V (2008)
- Saw VI (2009)
- Saw 3D (2010)
- Jigsaw (2017)
- Spiral (2021)

The series takes place primarily in an unnamed city in the United States. Flashbacks from Saw IV reveal the roots of the series, presenting John Kramer as a successful civil engineer and devoted husband to his wife Jill Tuck, who opened a rehab clinic for drug addicts. Jill loses her unborn son due to the unwitting actions of a drug addict named Cecil, who flees the scene. Saw VI later showed that another drug addict, Amanda Young, had been with Cecil on the night that he unwittingly caused the miscarriage, unbeknownst to John or Jill. Grieving the loss of his child, John distances himself from his friends and wife.

John and Jill eventually drift apart and divorce. John finds himself trapped by his own complacency until he is diagnosed with inoperable cancer. Bitter over his squandered life and the loss of his unborn son, he observes the lives of others and believes they do not value the gift of life. He approaches an insurance executive named William Easton, asking for coverage for an experimental cancer treatment, but is denied. Flashbacks from Saw II show that, after surviving a suicide attempt where he drives his car off a cliff, John is "reborn", and nurtures the idea that the only way for someone to change is for them to change themselves. Then, in Saw IV flashbacks, he designs the first trap and test for Cecil, and decides to use the rest of his existence to design more of these "tests" or "games" as a form of "instant rehabilitation" that would change the world "one person at a time". John is soon given the nickname "The Jigsaw Killer" (or "Jigsaw"), because he removes a puzzle piece-shaped chunk of flesh from those who do not escape his traps. John states that this name was given to him by the media, and that the cut piece of flesh represent that the victims were missing what he called the "survival instinct".

Few of John's victims can survive his brutal mechanical traps, which are often ironically symbolic representations of problems in the victim's life and require them to undergo severe physical and/or psychological torture to escape.

Jigsaw depicts one of John's first games, which never becomes public. The only survivor is Logan Nelson, the man who accidentally mislabeled John's x-rays, causing his cancer to go undiagnosed until it was too late. Believing Logan should not die over an honest mistake, John saves him before he is killed by one of the traps, and recruits him as his first apprentice. Logan helps John build several traps for future games, but for unknown reasons seemed to part ways with John by the events of Saw VI, since he is not mentioned in John's will or seen in any capacity.

In Saw V, police lieutenant Mark Hoffman's ties with John are revealed in a series of flashbacks. During John's first years of activity, Hoffman's sister was murdered by her boyfriend, Seth Baxter. Seth is sentenced to life imprisonment; however, a technicality allows him to go free after only five years. Hoffman then kills him in an inescapable trap designed to resemble a Jigsaw trap; everyone then believes that Jigsaw was behind the killing. John then kidnaps Hoffman and blackmails him into becoming his apprentice in his "rehabilitation" methods. Though initially forced to help, Hoffman later becomes a willing apprentice, and helps set up most of John's tests.

After beating her test, Amanda becomes the first publicly-known survivor of a Jigsaw game. She comes to see John as a hero who changed her life for the better and, on John's request, becomes his protégée and next apprentice. John shows her rehabilitation to Jill, who becomes aware of his traps and somewhat of an accomplice as well.

In Saw, John chains the man who diagnosed his cancer, Dr. Lawrence Gordon, in a dilapidated industrial washroom with Adam Stanheight, a photographer who has been tailing the doctor, believing he is cheating on his wife. Lawrence has instructions to kill Adam by six o'clock or his wife and daughter will be killed. Flashbacks show Detectives David Tapp and Steven Sing, who suspect Lawrence of being Jigsaw, following a trail of clues from other Jigsaw traps. Sing's death from a shotgun trap after saving a victim causes Tapp to obsess over catching Jigsaw. Later, he chases Zep Hindle, who monitors Adam and Lawrence's tests, and is shot in the chest. Eventually, Lawrence saws off his own foot to escape, leaving Adam in the bathroom while Lawrence tries to save his family and get help for Adam. It is later seen in Saw 3D that Lawrence finds a steaming hot pipe and cauterizes his wound, stopping the bleeding and ultimately surviving the trap. John catches up with Lawrence and makes him his next apprentice, a fact he hides from his other accomplices. Flashbacks from Saw III show that Amanda kidnapped Adam and later returned to suffocate him as an act of "mercy killing".

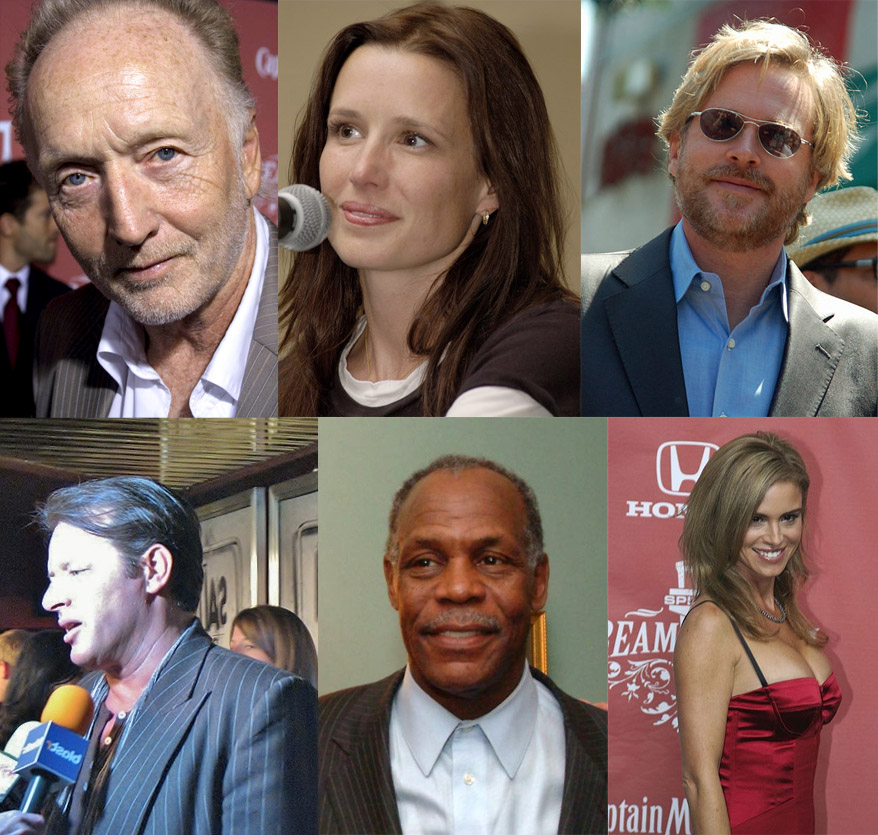
Central actors of the series. From top-left to bottom-right: Tobin Bell, Shawnee Smith, Cary Elwes, Costas Mandylor, Danny Glover, and Betsy Russell

Saw X takes place between the events of Saw and Saw II, and sees John traveling to Mexico in hopes that a Norwegian cancer treatment will cure him. However, when the operation is proven to be a scam, John, with the help of Amanda and Hoffman, kidnaps those responsible and subjects them to his traps, ultimately ending with the death of all but Dr. Cecilia Pederson.

Saw II begins with the police tracking a severely weakened John to his lair. However, another test is in place, as he and Amanda have kidnapped the son of Detective Eric Matthews and trapped him and a group of seven convicts, previously framed by Eric, in a house that is slowly being filled with sarin gas, with Amanda among them. He will trade Daniel Matthews' life for Eric's time, conversing with him until the game is concluded. Eric loses his patience and assaults John, forcing him to take him to the house, only to discover that the video feed from inside the house had been pre-recorded; the events in it actually took place much earlier. Eric's son was locked in a safe in John's warehouse and kept alive with an oxygen tank. Eric is knocked unconscious by a masked figure and wakes up imprisoned in the bathroom from Saw, which is part of the house's foundation. Amanda reveals herself to Eric as John's protégée before leaving him to die. In a flashback from Saw III, Eric manages to escape the bathroom by breaking his foot. He confronts and beats Amanda, demanding to know where his son is. Amanda fights him off and leaves him for dead. A flashback from Saw IV shows Hoffman later dragging Eric to a prison cell, keeping him alive for a future game.

The events of Saw III and Saw IV occur concurrently. Saw III begins with John, weakened and near death, confined to a makeshift hospital bed. Amanda has taken over his work, designing traps of her own; however, these traps are inescapable, as Amanda is convinced that John's traps have no effect and that people do not change. Lynn Denlon, a kidnapped doctor, is forced to keep John alive while another test is performed on Jeff Denlon, a man obsessed with vengeance against the drunk driver who killed his son. John, unwilling to allow a murderer to continue his legacy, designs a test for Amanda as well; she ultimately fails, resulting in the deaths of herself, John, Lynn, and Jeff. Saw IV, meanwhile, revolves around tests meant for Officer Daniel Rigg, which are overseen by Hoffman, who masquerades as a participant in the game. Rigg fails his test, resulting in Eric's death. Rigg is left to bleed to death by Hoffman, who later discovers the bodies of John and Amanda. When an autopsy is performed on John, a cassette tape coated in wax is found in his stomach; the tape informs Hoffman that he is wrong to think that it is all over just because John is dead, and he should not expect to go untested.

The events of Saw V show Hoffman's first solo test: five people connected to a disastrous fire that killed several others are put into four interconnected tests of teamwork, killing off one person in each trap. The two remaining test subjects realize at the final trap that each previous trap was meant to be completed by each of the five people doing a small part, rather than killing one person per trap. With this knowledge, they work together and barely manage to escape. They are found alive by Special Agent Dan Erickson. Meanwhile, Hoffman has set up FBI Agent Peter Strahm to appear to be Jigsaw's accomplice, while Strahm pursues Hoffman and is eventually killed due to his inability to follow Hoffman's rules, leaving Hoffman free to continue Jigsaw's "work".

Saw VI begins with Hoffman setting up a game as per John's instructions left in a box for Jill during Saw V. This game centers on the health insurance executive, William, who oversees a team responsible for rejecting two-thirds of all insurance claims. As William progresses through four tests, he saves as many people as he can and learns the error of his ways, which inherently "kill" the rejected. His last test is a test of forgiveness by the family of Harold Abbott, whom William refused a claim. Harold's son ultimately chooses to kill William with hydrofluoric acid. Meanwhile, Agent Erickson and the previously thought-dead Agent Lindsey Perez search for Agent Strahm with Hoffman's assistance. Finding irregularities in previous murder scenes, Perez and Erickson discover Hoffman's identity, but he kills them before they can go public with it. Hoffman travels back to the site of William's tests, where Jill attacks him to obey John's final request. She leaves him in a new trap John has left behind and does not leave a key for him to free himself. He is able to manipulate the trap and escapes wounded.

Saw 3D picks up with Jill and Hoffman battling for control of John's legacy. As Jill enters protective custody and makes Hoffman's identity public, Hoffman sets up a new game involving skinheads to find a way to Jill. Meanwhile, Bobby Dagen, a fraud who has written a book about escaping a Jigsaw trap he never experienced, is captured and forced to confront people who knew that he lied about being in a trap. Three of Bobby's friends die and his test concludes with him being forced to re-enact the trap he claimed to have escaped. He fails, causing the death of his wife. Meanwhile, Hoffman poses as a corpse and kills several officers to infiltrate the police station. He finds and kills Jill using the reverse bear trap. Hoffman attempts to leave town but is captured by Lawrence and his accomplices, then placed in the bathroom from Saw. Lawrence leaves Hoffman shackled in the bathroom to die.

The present-day portion of Jigsaw takes place roughly ten years after John's death in Saw III. When a new Jigsaw game leaves several people dead, the police come to believe that either John has been resurrected, or a Jigsaw copycat is involved. It is eventually revealed that Logan is the new Jigsaw Killer, and that he recreated the game he was once part of using new victims. Logan abducts corrupt detective Brad Halloran and kills him as revenge for him being indirectly responsible for the death of Logan's wife. Having successfully framed Halloran as the killer, Logan escapes and is free to continue Jigsaw's work.

Spiral takes place an unknown amount of time after John's death, as another Jigsaw copycat creates their own games to punish corrupt police officers and detectives. The case is investigated by Detective Zeke Banks, who eventually discovers that his new partner, Detective William Schenk, is the killer. Schenk kidnaps Zeke's father Marcus, who is largely responsible for the corruption in the police department, and reveals that his own father was killed by a dirty cop and that he hopes to recruit Zeke as a partner in cleansing the department of corruption. Zeke is then forced to choose between killing Schenk or saving his father; he manages to rescue Marcus, but Schenk calls a SWAT team and makes it appear that Marcus is the aggressor and is holding a gun. Schenk then escapes as the SWAT team restrains Zeke and shoots Marcus to death.

=== Recurring elements ===
Billy the Puppet

Billy the Puppet in the 2003 short film

Billy is a puppet resembling a ventriloquist's dummy, sometimes seen riding a tricycle, that has appeared throughout the films and has become a type of mascot for the series. It is used by the Jigsaw Killer to communicate with his victims by delivering televised messages or occasionally in person to describe details of the sadistic traps and the means by which the victims could survive. Viewers have sometimes incorrectly identified the puppet itself as Jigsaw, because of its presence and connection to the killer.

Age and use of the puppet over the course of the films necessitated its reconstruction. According to James Wan, the original puppet's face for Saw involved clay, papier-mâché, and black ping-pong balls with the irises painted in for the eyes, but in later films more sophisticated construction included waterjet-cut foam for the body and remote-controlled animatronics.

The endurance and popularity of the franchise has resulted in the production of Billy merchandise, as well as references in other media and its use in promotions for the films.

The bathroom The bathroom trap, originating in Saw, can be seen throughout the franchise and was repeatedly used as or housed traps. It is seen in the mid-credits of Saw X against one of Cecilia Peterson's partners, Henry Kessler. It appeared in Saw II, Saw III, Saw 3D and Saw X. It became iconic and, with Billy the Puppet, are a symbol of the franchise and has been kept for over 20 years.

"Hello Zepp"

"Hello Zepp" is a piece of instrumental music that was originally composed by Charlie Clouser for the first film in the series. In Saw, the implied villain, Zep Hindle, is revealed to actually be a victim of the Jigsaw Killer. The character's name in the script is spelled "Zep", whereas the music titles are spelled "Zepp" as a reference to the popular '80s band Zapp. As the series continued, the piece was reused in every film as a leitmotif, often being renamed and remixed to accommodate the changing situations and characters. The music was used in every Saw ending, usually during the revealing of plot revelations and twists which Saw films often use and it serves as the main theme tune for the whole series.

Traps
An important component of each film is the variety of (usually mechanical in form) traps Jigsaw and his apprentices use on their captives to communicate his message.

According to David Hackl, all of the traps are real objects, and not CGI. They were designed to look horrific but ultimately be safe for the actors in them. Writer Marcus Dunstan said: "It's built to function there on the day", and added: "It works. So if there's a scalping chair—there really was a chair with working gears to grind and pull your scalp back." The most potentially dangerous item was a "water box" used in Saw V, in which one of the actors (Scott Patterson, as Peter Strahm) had to keep his head submerged as long as possible. Another element of the traps is that Hackl desired a specific look of rust and menace, but he also wanted them to have a type of beauty about them.

== Reception ==
=== Box office performance ===
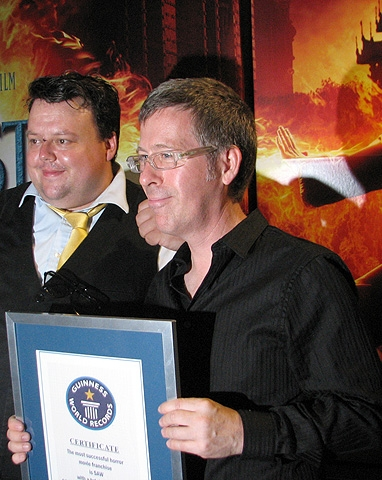
The Saw series was placed in the Guinness World Records as the "Most Successful Horror Franchise". Pictured here is director Kevin Greutert receiving the award at the 2010 Comic-Con.

Saw grossed $18.2 million its opening weekend and had become Lionsgate's second-best opening, after Fahrenheit 9/11's $23.9 million (2004). Saw went on to gross $103 million worldwide, and is the fourth-lowest-grossing film in the series after Jigsaw, Saw VI, and Spiral. At the time, it became the most profitable horror film after Scream (1996). It is the seventh-highest-grossing Halloween opening weekend. Saw II opened at number one with $31.7 million, and set a Lionsgate Halloween opening-weekend record and is also the third-highest-grossing Halloween opener. It became at the time, the widest release in Lionsgate history and one of the best opening weekends for a horror sequel. It is Lionsgate's fourth-highest-grossing film in the United States and Canada. Saw III placed first by grossing $33.6 million its opening weekend, making it the biggest Halloween debut ever and at the time, Lionsgate's highest-opening weekend. It is the highest-grossing film in the series worldwide. It has the highest-grossing weekend in the series and also Lionsgate's fifth-highest-grossing film in the United States and Canada.

Saw IV premiered at number one with $32.1 million making it the second-best Halloween weekend opener. In Saw V's opening weekend it placed second, being beat by High School Musical 3: Senior Year, and made $30.1 million. It is Lionsgate's tenth-highest-grossing film. Saw VI opened in second place behind Paranormal Activity to $14.1 million, which is the lowest of all the Saw films worldwide. It is also the lowest-grossing film in the series. Saw 3D placed first grossing $22.5 million its opening weekend, with 92% of tickets coming from more than 2,100 3D-equipped locations. It had the fifth-best opening weekend in the Saw series. It is the most successful film in the franchise since Saw IV. In the United States and Canada, Jigsaw was released alongside Thank You for Your Service and Suburbicon, and is projected to gross around $20 million from 2,941 theaters in its opening weekend. It made $1.6 million from Thursday night previews at 2,400 theaters, just below the $1.7 million Saw 3D made from midnight screenings seven years prior, and $7.2 million on its first day. It went on to open to $16.64 million, finishing first at the box office but marking the second lowest debut of the franchise. In its second weekend the film dropped 61% to $6.56 million, finishing third behind newcomers Thor: Ragnarok and A Bad Moms Christmas. In its third weekend, the film dropped another 47% and made $3.43 million, finishing fifth.

The Saw series, when compared to the other top-grossing American horror series—A Nightmare on Elm Street, Child's Play, Friday the 13th, Halloween, Scream, and The Texas Chainsaw Massacre—and adjusting for 2023 inflation, is the fifth highest grossing series with $688.3 million. Halloween is the highest-grossing horror series in the United States at approximately $1.09 billion, with Friday the 13th in second at $908.4 million, The Nightmare on Elm Street series is in third with $793.5 million. The Scream film series is in fourth place with $779.5 million. The Texas Chainsaw Massacre series is in sixth with $459.7 million, and the Child's Play film series rounding out the list with $305.2 million.

The box office numbers, unadjusted for inflation are as follows:

Film	Year	Revenue			Budget	References
Film	Year	United States and Canada	Other markets	Worldwide	Budget	References
Saw	2004	$56,000,369	$48,003,849	$104,004,218	$1–1.2 million	
Saw II	2005	$87,039,965	$60,708,540	$147,748,505	$4 million	
Saw III	2006	$80,238,724	$84,635,551	$164,874,275	$10 million	
Saw IV	2007	$63,300,095	$76,052,538	$139,352,633	$10 million	
Saw V	2008	$56,746,769	$57,117,290	$113,864,059	$10.8 million	
Saw VI	2009	$27,693,292	$40,540,337	$68,233,629	$11 million	
Saw 3D	2010	$45,710,178	$90,440,256	$136,150,434	$17 million	
Jigsaw	2017	$38,052,832	$64,900,056	$102,952,888	$10 million	
Spiral	2021	$23,216,862	$17,392,032	$40,608,894	$20 million	
Saw X	2023	$53,607,898	$71,711,816	$125,319,714	$13 million	
Total		$529 million	$583 million	$1.1 billion	$120 million	

=== Critical and public response ===
On IGN's list of the top twenty-five film franchises of all time, the Saw series ranked as 25th. Rotten Tomatoes ranked the series as the 7th-best horror franchise of all time.

Film	Rotten Tomatoes	Metacritic	CinemaScore
Saw	50% (193 reviews)	46 (32 reviews)	C+
Saw II	37% (124 reviews)	40 (28 reviews)	B+
Saw III	29% (95 reviews)	48 (16 reviews)	B
Saw IV	18% (84 reviews)	36 (16 reviews)	B
Saw V	13% (77 reviews)	20 (13 reviews)	C
Saw VI	39% (75 reviews)	30 (12 reviews)	B
Saw 3D	9% (82 reviews)	24 (17 reviews)	B-
Jigsaw	32% (91 reviews)	39 (18 reviews)	B
Spiral	37% (229 reviews)	40 (33 reviews)	B-
Saw X	81% (149 reviews)	60 (24 reviews)	B

== Other media ==
=== Video games ===
In mid-2009, Japanese video game company Konami stated that they wanted to make Saw a series of video games to supplement the films. They also wished to make Saw their next big survival horror franchise next to their other property, Silent Hill. They stated that because Saw focuses on visual intensity and Silent Hill focuses on psychological terror, both could exist in the video game industry without directly competing against each other. The first game in the series, Saw, set between the first and second film in the series, was released on October 6, 2009, with a sequel Saw II: Flesh & Blood, released on October 19, 2010, for the Xbox 360 and PlayStation 3, ten days before the release of the seventh film, Saw 3D. The PC version was in development, but was cancelled. The build of the game for Microsoft Windows was discovered in the leak of 12 terabytes of Steam files in August 2026.

A downloadable Saw chapter for the asymmetrical horror game Dead by Daylight was released on January 23, 2018, featuring David Tapp as a survivor and Amanda Young as a killer alongside Gideon Meat Plant as a map.

On October 1, 2023, the Roblox game Saw X: Survive the Obby was released, developed by Amber Studio.

In October 2021, Twisted Productions co-founders Burg and Koules confirmed a third Saw video game was in development for the PlayStation 5 and Xbox Series X. In January 2026, Lionsgate mentioned the upcoming Saw game during an earnings call. In June of the same year, Lionsgate announced it would be a multiplayer game published by Bloober Team titled Saw: Genesis.

Billy the Puppet has appeared as a playable character in the video games Call of Duty: Warzone, Call of Duty: Modern Warfare, Call of Duty: Mobile, and Fortnite, and in a decal and as a goal explosion in Rocket League. Billy the Puppet was also featured on Delta Force in addition to the franchise-based chainsaw and weapon skins.

=== Comic books ===
Saw: Rebirth, a comic book prequel to the original film released to promote Saw II. Its canonicity was later contradicted by events in Saw IV. It is, however, the first canonical appearance of Jigsaw's wife, Jill, who was later introduced into the film series in Saw III and established still-canonical elements of Jigsaw's backstory (an engineer who is dying from brain cancer).

=== Theme park attractions ===
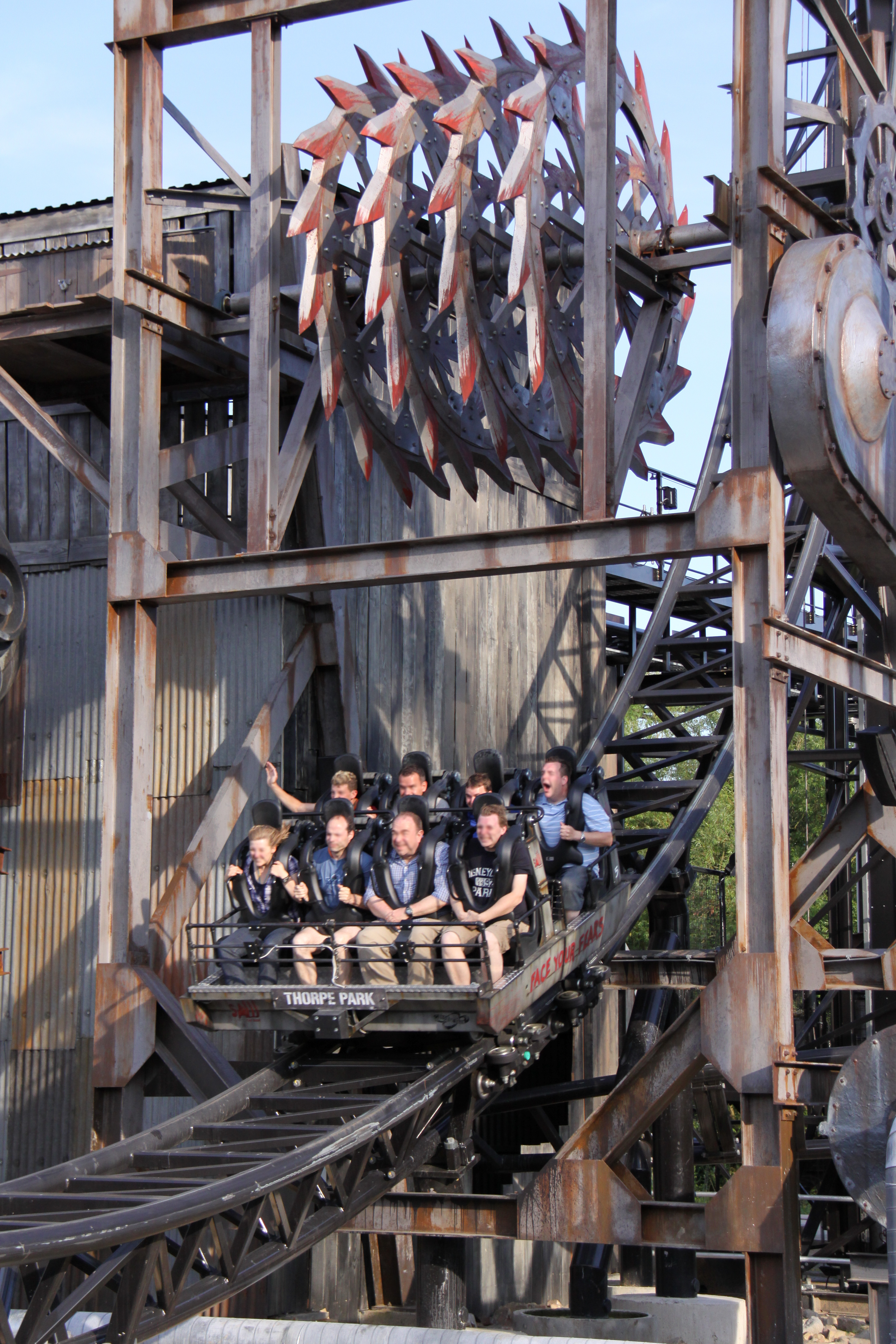
Saw – The Ride at Thorpe Park

- "Saw – The Ride" is a Gerstlauer Euro-Fighter roller coaster themed around the franchise, which opened on March 13, 2009, at Thorpe Park in the United Kingdom. It features an enclosed dark ride section with special effects, before traveling outside and climbing a 100-foot vertical lift hill into a steep 100-degree beyond-vertical drop passing under large rotating saw blades.
- Thorpe Park opened a temporary Saw attraction called "Saw – Movie Bites" for their 2009 Fright Nights event.
- Thorpe Park added a permanent, year-round live action horror maze themed around the Saw movies. Named "Saw: Alive", it opened at the start of the 2010 season, and featured six scenes representing one iconic trap from the first six films. It ceased year-round operations at the start of the 2012 season, instead only operating during Fright Nights (Thorpe Park's annual Halloween event). It closed permanently after the 2018 season.
- "Saw: Game Over" was a 2009 horror maze made by Universal Studios for Halloween Horror Nights, based on characters, traps and scenes from the films. At the Universal Studios Hollywood rendition of Horror Nights it was titled Saw: Game Over, while at the Universal Studios Florida rendition, it was simply titled Saw.
- "Saw", a themed haunted house, operated during the month of October at Fright Dome, Circus Circus Las Vegas. It featured interactive, handcrafted replicas of the "games" set by Jigsaw. It was introduced in 2009 and partnered with Lionsgate and Twisted Pictures.
- In 2018, a themed escape room called "Saw Escape Las Vegas" was made by the creators of Fright Dome. It is officially licensed by LionsGate and is also located in the city of Las Vegas in Nevada, USA as the name suggests.
- In 2010, "Halloween Fright Nights" at Warner Bros. Movie World featured a maze created by Sudden Impact Entertainment, featuring characters, traps and scenes from the films. The maze was simply titled "Saw Maze".
- "Saw Haunted Attraction" was a maze at the Brea Plaza Shopping Center in 2008 created by Sinister Pointe Haunted Attractions.
- "SAWMANIA" was a fan event in New York. Eventgoers were able to meet actors and directors, and view props used in the films.
- "SAW: Legacy of Terror" has been an attraction at various Six Flags Fright Fest locations since 2024.

=== Podcast ===
In 2021, as part of the promotion for Spiral, a 9-episode podcast called Seeing Saw: The Official Spiral Podcast was released. In 2023, as part of the promotion for Saw X, the podcast was continued for three episodes under the title Seeing Saw: The Official Podcast.

=== Merchandising ===
Merchandising includes Billy the Puppet dolls, Jigsaw figurines and costumes, and Pig mask figurines and masks.

== See also ==
- Extreme cinema
