= Catacombs (2007 film) =

American horror film

- Promotional poster
- Directed by: Tomm Coker; David Elliot
- Written by: Tomm Coker; David Elliot; Ciaran Lambe
- Produced by: Gregg Hoffman; Oren Koules; Mark Burg
- Starring: Shannyn Sossamon; Alecia Moore
- Cinematography: Maxime Alexandre
- Edited by: Josh Rifkin
- Music by: Hybrid; Yoshiki
- Production company: Twisted Pictures
- Distributed by: Lionsgate
- Release date: October 1, 2007 (VOD)
- Running time: 90 minutes
- Country: United States
- Language: English

Catacombs is a 2007 American horror film directed by Tomm Coker and David Elliot, starring Shannyn Sossamon and Alecia Moore. The plot follows a young woman attempting to find her way out of the Catacombs of Paris with a killer pursuing her.

It is the first original film from FEARnet, collaborating with Lions Gate Entertainment and was released on October 7, 2007. The film's soundtrack was composed by Yoshiki, including the theme song "Blue Butterfly" written by Yoshiki and performed by Violet UK.

== Plot ==
Victoria, an anxiety-ridden young woman, receives an invitation from her sister Carolyn to visit her in Paris.

When she arrives, Carolyn takes her home and after settling in, the sisters tour Paris and do some shopping. During a break, Carolyn tells Victoria about a secret rave in the Catacombs of Paris taking place that night. They decide to go and despite a long queue are allowed straight in, as Carolyn is friends with the bouncer, Hugo. Victoria is given a flashlight and follows Carolyn to the rave, where they arrive to hear an introduction by host Jean-Michel. Victoria begins to have an anxiety attack and Jean-Michel escorts her to the private VIP area of the party, where they find Carolyn and a group of friends.

Jean-Michel pours Victoria a large glass of absinthe and tells her of a killer living in the catacombs. Raised by a Satanic Cult, the killer, "Antichrist," feeds on people who get lost in the Catacombs. Most of the group dismisses the story as a myth and they decide to go skinny dipping. Victoria declines to join them and becomes lost as she heads back to the rave. She is joined by Carolyn, and as the sisters attempt to find their way back, someone grabs Carolyn and drags her off into the darkness. Victoria finds Carolyn's body and a man in a goat mask begins to chase her. She hides in a storage room, but the man arrives and starts a generator and it seems that the storage room is his home. Victoria escapes and runs back toward the crowd who are still at the rave.

She has scarcely returned when the Prefecture of Police burst in to break up the rave and she is caught up in a mob and knocked unconscious. When she wakes up she is alone in the catacombs again. She encounters a man named Henri who tries to help her, but every exit they come to is blocked. Henri falls through a rotted walkway and injures his leg. Victoria tries to help him, but eventually gives up, taking his map and leaving him in the dark. She gets turned around and ends up back at the spot he fell. only to discover he climbed out and attacks her. She is able to escape after hitting him with her flashlight.

When she finds an exit she is frightened by someone on the other side trying to get in and she flees, fearing it is the Antichrist. After a chase through the tunnels, she hides behind a wall column, armed with a mining pick. When the pursuer approaches, she strikes out blindly with the pick and hits him.

Shortly after, Carolyn and her friends show up and tell Victoria that it was all just a prank. Carolyn thought it would help Vic with her "issues". They wonder why Victoria is crying until they notice Jean-Michel lying dead, felled by the blow of Victoria's pick. Carolyn severely scolds Victoria, telling her she hates her and everything she has ever done has been a failure. Victoria becomes increasingly distressed and responds by brutally killing Carolyn and her remaining friends with the pick.

Escaping at last from the catacombs, Victoria returns to the airport in a taxi and repeats a voice-over line which started the film.

== Cast ==
- Shannyn Sossamon as Victoria
- Alecia Moore as Carolyn
- Emil Hoștină as Henry
- Sandi Drăgoi as Llaves
- Mihai Stănescu as Jean Michel
- Cabral Ibacka as Hugo
- Radu Andrei Micu as Nico
- Cain Manoli as Leon
- Gage Munroe as Friend of Henry
- Joseph Marco as Friend of Henry

== Production ==
Though exterior shots of Paris were shot on location, most of Catacombs was filmed in Bucharest, Romania. Reconstructions of the actual Paris Catacombs were built on a soundstage where the bulk of the film was shot.

== Release ==
Catacombs premiered on FEARnet On Demand on October 1, 2007.

== See also ==
- FEARnet
- Catacombs of Paris
