= Saw III =

2006 film by Darren Lynn Bousman

- Theatrical release poster
- Directed by: Darren Lynn Bousman
- Screenplay by: Leigh Whannell
- Story by: Leigh Whannell; James Wan
- Produced by: Gregg Hoffman (Note: Although Hoffman died in 2005, he received posthumous producer credit for this film.); Oren Koules; Mark Burg
- Starring: Tobin Bell; Shawnee Smith; Angus Macfadyen; Bahar Soomekh; Dina Meyer
- Cinematography: David A. Armstrong
- Edited by: Kevin Greutert
- Music by: Charlie Clouser
- Production company: Twisted Pictures
- Distributed by: Lionsgate Films
- Release date: October 27, 2006
- Running time: 108 minutes
- Country: United States
- Language: English
- Budget: $10 million
- Box office: $164.9 million

Saw III is a 2006 American horror film directed by Darren Lynn Bousman from a screenplay by Leigh Whannell and a story by Whannell and James Wan. A sequel to Saw II (2005) and the third installment in the Saw film series, it stars Tobin Bell, Shawnee Smith, Angus Macfadyen, Bahar Soomekh, and Dina Meyer.

In the film, John Kramer (Bell), who is known as the Jigsaw Killer and forces his victims to participate in deadly games in order to test their will to live, puts a man named Jeff (Macfadyen) through a series of tests of his ability to forgive, after Jeff's son was killed by a drunk driver. Meanwhile, John's apprentice Amanda (Smith) has kidnapped a doctor named Lynn (Soomekh) and tasked her with keeping John, who is bedridden with terminal cancer, alive long enough for Jeff to complete his game.

Much like its predecessor, the film was immediately green-lit after the successful opening weekend of the prior film. Filming took place in Toronto from May to June 2006. Whannell aimed to make the story more emotional than previous installments, particularly with the Amanda and Jigsaw storyline. The film is dedicated to producer Gregg Hoffman, who died on December 4, 2005.

Saw III was released in the United States on October 27, 2006, by Lionsgate Films. It was a financial success, opening to $33.6 million and grossing $80.2 million in the United States and Canada. It is the highest-grossing film of the series in the international market and the highest-grossing film in the series overall. It received negative reviews from critics. Bell was nominated for "Best Villain" at the 2007 MTV Movie Awards and the film received nominations for a Saturn Award as "Best Horror Film". The film was released to DVD and Blu-ray on January 23, 2007, where it topped the charts selling 2.5 million units in its first week. A sequel, Saw IV, was released in 2007.

== Plot ==
After being imprisoned in the bathroom, (Note: As depicted in Saw II) Detective Eric Matthews breaks his foot with a toilet lid to escape. Six months later, the scene of a Jigsaw game is discovered by Officer Daniel Rigg's SWAT team. The victim, Troy, had to rip chains from his body to escape a bomb. Detective Allison Kerry points out that the room's exit was welded shut, breaking Jigsaw's modus operandi of allowing his victims an opportunity to survive. Kerry is abducted and awakens in a harness hooked into her ribs. She retrieves the key from a beaker of acid as instructed, but opening the lock does not keep the trap from killing her.

Dr. Lynn Denlon is abducted from the hospital she works at and brought to the now bedridden John Kramer. His apprentice, Amanda, locks a collar armed with five shotgun shells around Lynn's neck that is connected to John's heart rate monitor and will detonate if she moves out of range or John dies. Lynn is instructed by Amanda to keep him alive until another test subject has completed his game; the victim, Jeff, a grief-stricken father who was consumed with vengeance after the death of his son Dylan in a drunk driving crash years earlier, must undergo a series of tests at an abandoned meatpacking plant to confront those involved in the case.

Jeff's first test leads him into a meat freezer where he finds Danica, the only witness to the crash (who refused to testify in court), completely naked and chained to a metal frame inside the plant's freezer, with nozzles inside the frame spraying her with water to quicken her hypothermia. Jeff retrieves the key after Danica persuades him to help her, but she freezes to death before he can do so. In his next test, Judge Halden, who passed a lenient sentence on the driver who caused Dylan's death, is chained at the neck to the bottom of a vat. Rotting pig carcasses are dropped into a grinder that slowly fill the vat until Jeff saves him by burning Dylan's belongings in an incinerator to retrieve a key. His third test involves Timothy, the driver who killed Dylan, who is strapped to a machine that will slowly twist and snap his limbs and then his neck. The key is tied to the trigger of an enclosed shotgun that goes off after Jeff retrieves it, killing Halden. Jeff cries out twice that he forgives Timothy, but even so, he cannot save him in time; the machine twists and breaks Timothy's neck.

Lynn is forced to perform an improvised surgery to relieve pressure on John's brain. The surgery is successful, and Lynn convinces John to order Amanda to remove the collar. However, Amanda refuses and threatens Lynn's life, having become jealous of her interactions with John. John pleads with Amanda, who admits that she no longer believes in his philosophy and had rigged Troy and Kerry's traps, making them unbeatable. Refusing to listen to John's warnings, Amanda shoots Lynn just as Jeff arrives. Jeff, who is revealed to be Lynn's husband, retaliates by shooting Amanda with a gun provided by John after his tests. As Amanda dies, John reveals that Lynn's test was actually hers: John was aware of her motives and unwilling to allow a murderer to continue his legacy. He then addresses Jeff, offering to call an ambulance for Lynn if he has learned everything from his ordeal, and accept one last test: either killing John or forgiving him. In response, Jeff slashes John's throat with a power saw, activating Lynn's collar as the room is sealed shut. Before dying, John takes out a tape recorder to inform Jeff that his daughter, Corbett, is also captured and no one but him knows where she is being held.

== Cast ==
- Tobin Bell as Jigsaw/John
- Shawnee Smith as Amanda
- Angus Macfadyen as Jeff
- Bahar Soomekh as Lynn
- Donnie Wahlberg as Eric Matthews
- Dina Meyer as Kerry
- Leigh Whannell as Adam
- Mpho Koaho as Tim
- Barry Flatman as Judge Halden
- Lyriq Bent as Rigg
- J. Larose as Troy
- Debra Lynne McCabe as Danica
- Costas Mandylor as Forensic Hoffman
- Betsy Russell as Jill
- Stefan Georgiou as Dylan
- Niamh Wilson as Corbett
- Alan van Sprang as Chris
- Kim Roberts as Deborah

== Production ==
=== Development and writing ===
Darren Lynn Bousman, director and co-writer of Saw II (2005), James Wan, director of Saw (2004), and Leigh Whannell, screenwriter on both, turned down the offer to make a third film in the franchise. Producer Gregg Hoffman died a few weeks after its release. Bousman, Wan, and Whannell got together to have lunch the day they heard of Hoffman's passing and decided to make Saw III in dedication to Hoffman. Whannell aimed to make Saw III more emotional, describing the plot as essentially a father-daughter "love story" between John Kramer / Jigsaw and Amanda Young.

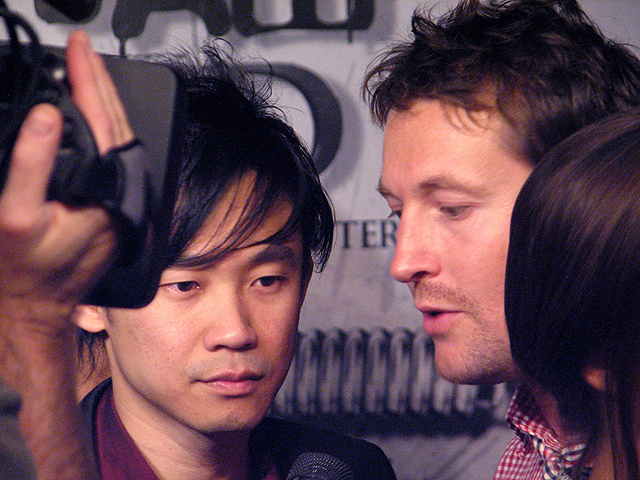
Wan (left) and Whannell (right) returned to write Saw III and also served as executive producers.

Bousman said they did not intend to have a twist ending, as distinctly as the previous films, noting that "I think most people will figure it out in the first 15 minutes of the film". Whannell added, "What Darren and I struck for Saw III was to have an emotionally impactful ending". As with the previous two films, the ending was only given to the actors who appeared in the final scene at the time it was filmed. At one point the script was stolen from Bousman's chair; however, it was returned before it was leaked online.

=== Casting ===
After Bahar Soomekh appeared in Crash (2004), Lionsgate wanted her in the next Saw film. She was cast in Saw III in the role of Dr. Lynn Denlon. Not a fan of horror films nor having seen the first two Saw films, she found the role challenging. "I had nightmares the first month I was on set", she said. She did, however, enjoy not being typecasted as a Middle Eastern like in most of her previous roles. Angus Macfadyen, a fan of certain horror films including Saw, was cast as Jeff after reading and liking the script.

Costas Mandylor was cast as Forensic Hoffman after being introduced to Bousman. Mandylor explained, "At some point I was introduced to the director and he asked if I wanted to come up and have some fun for a week on Saw III. So I thought why not, they're some good guys and all that, so we're gonna have some fun. So being in that movie for a minute or two, I made the most of it and had fun with the guys". J. Larose was cast as Troy, Jigsaw's victim at the beginning of the film. Larose found challenge in playing a role that required making the character's pain look and feel authentic but felt grateful for playing the opening sequence victim of a Saw film, appreciating his opportunity to work with Bousman.

Monica Potter, who played Alison, the wife of Dr. Gordon in the first film, was approached to reprise her role in the film but she declined the offer due to a lack of interest. She felt that she had done "plenty" with the first film. Similarly, Rigg's role in the movie was significantly reduced as Lyriq Bent was unavailable due to his work in Angela's Eyes (2006) at the same time; despite the filmmakers' attempts to make his schedule work, Bent was only able to shoot one day.

=== Filming ===
Saw III was given a larger budget of $10 million, compared to Saw II's $4 million. Principal photography took place for 27 days at Toronto's Cinespace Film Studios from May 8, 2006, to late June. Production borrowed the bathroom set used in Scary Movie 4, which parodied the franchise. Almost all the transitions from one place to another were not made using digital effects; the transitions were shot on the spot. For example, when the camera moves from Troy's crime scene to Kerry being in the bathtub, Meyer had to run, take off all her clothes, and jump into the tub. Visually the film is akin to the previous two with using quick cuts and fast-paced rhythms. Bousman said, "We're using a lot of whip pans and flash frames to create a dynamic feel". Post-production services were provided by Deluxe. The original cut of the film ran for slightly over two hours, and several scenes were cut out. A scene that showed Jigsaw regretting his actions was also cut. Bell said, "I'm glad they cut that scene. This guy knows exactly what he's doing. Does he start off with a model, then refine it? Yeah, he probably does. But there are certain things that are interesting and advance the story, and there are other things that are basically sort of backstory, and you don't really need to know".

=== Trap designs ===
Bousman described the hardest scene to film was the "Pig Scene", explaining that they had to rush and it involved filming "so many moving parts". The pig carcasses were made out of foam, rubber, and latex. The pig props had live, disinfected maggots attached with honey.

For "The Rack Trap", Whannell originally conceived it as a trap that would fold a person into a box, though it eventually morphed into the twisting of body parts. Bousman wanted to have a trap that involved freezing someone to death since the films had already covered burning to death, bleeding to death, and being cut to death. A body cast was made of Debra Lynne McCabe for "The Freezer Room" trap, but due to safety regulations a person cannot be entombed; only a front or back body cast could be on the actress at any given time. For the "Classroom Trap", J. Larose's character was originally going to be hanged from the ceiling by meat hooks, but it was decided against since he would not have been able to rip the chains out himself (as the script called for). It proved to be a challenge since it was done with prosthetics and practical effects.

== Release ==
Saw III was released theatrically in the United States and Canada October 27, 2006. According to executive producer Daniel Heffner, the film was toned down seven times to obtain the "R" rating. According to Bousman, the Motion Picture Association of America (MPAA) ratings board was less concerned with the film's graphic violence than it was with emotional torture, citing television shows like CSI for expanding the scope of what is acceptable. In Japan, Saw III received a R18+ rating while the previous two films received an R15+ rating. At screenings in the United Kingdom, five people were reported to have fainted at separate cinemas with three at one cinema, resulting in ambulances being called. In the United Kingdom it is the first film in the series to be directly distributed by Lionsgate, the previous films were distributed by Entertainment Film Distributors.

=== Marketing ===
The opening scene of Troy's trap was shown at San Diego Comic-Con on July 21, 2006. The same clip was planned to be shown before the opening of Crank in theaters on September 1, 2006. However, the MPAA would not allow it. On October 10, 2006, Bell, Smith and Bousman appeared at Spike TV's Scream Awards to promote the film and the clip of Troy's trap was shown.

Lionsgate's president of theatrical marketing Tim Palen thought of the idea to make 1,000 posters with a small amount of Bell's blood, which was mixed with the printing ink. He said, "I asked if it would be possible to use actual blood. There was silence. He said, 'We could try, but are you serious?' I said I was dead serious." The posters were sold for $20, with the first being auctioned off; all the proceeds from the auctioned poster were donated to the Red Cross. Lionsgate also held the third annual "Give Til It Hurts" blood drive for the Red Cross and collected 23,493 pints of blood.

=== Soundtrack ===
The Saw III soundtrack was released on October 24, 2006. It included 20 songs from heavy metal bands like Slayer, Disturbed, Avenged Sevenfold, Ministry, All That Remains, and Helmet. James Christopher Monger of AllMusic gave the soundtrack three out of five stars. Ed Thompson of IGN Music gave it a 7.2 out of 10.

=== Home media ===
Saw III was released to DVD and Blu-ray through Lionsgate Home Entertainment on January 23, 2007. It topped the home video charts in the United States and Canada with 1.6 million units sold its first day and finished the week with 2.5 million units sold. The "Unrated Edition" was also released that day and features a 113-minute cut of the film that includes more gore. A 120-minute-long director's cut was released on October 23, 2007, to coincide with the theatrical release of Saw IV on October 26. It also included an alternate ending. The film grossed $47.5 million in home sales. The film was released on 4K UHD in an Amazon-exclusive steelbook on October 21, 2025.

== Reception ==
=== Box office ===
Saw III opened at number one on 4,700 screens at 3,167 theaters grossing $33.6 million from its opening weekend, a two percent increase from Saw II's $31.7 million. It held the biggest Halloween weekend debut for five years until it was beaten in 2011 by Puss in Boots ($34 million). It was also Lionsgate's highest-opening weekend. Lionsgate's exit polling indicated that 69 percent of the audience was under 25 years old and 51 percent was male. In its second weekend it placed number four, dropping down 56% to $14.8 million, compared to Saw II's second weekend drop of 47% to $16.9 million. The film was closed out of theaters on December 14, 2006, after 49 days of release.

Saw III opened at number five in the international market with an estimated $6 million. It opened at number one in the United Kingdom to $4.7 million. In Taiwan, it placed third and opened to $320,000. For its second weekend it opened to number two with an estimated $9.7 million. In Spain, it made $3.1 million, an improvement over the previous films. For its third weekend, Saw III grossed $8 million, including Japan's opening on 86 screens with $1.1 million. Australia made $4.3 million, Spain grossed $3.8 million and Brazil made $3.8 million. By its fourth weekend, it placed fourth place with an estimated $5.6 million from 24 territories. Its best market was a second-place start in France.

The film took in $80.2 million in the United States and Canada and $84.6 million in other territories, for a worldwide total of $164.8 million. Saw III has the highest-grossing weekend in the series, highest-grossing in the international market and is the highest-grossing film in the series worldwide.

=== Critical response ===
Saw III was not screened in advance for critics. On the review aggregator website Rotten Tomatoes, 28% of 92 critics' reviews are positive, with an average rating of 4.6/10. The website's consensus reads: "Saw III does little beyond repeating its predecessor's tropes on a gorier level." Metacritic, which uses a weighted average, assigned the film a score of 48 out of 100, based on 16 critics, indicating "mixed or average" reviews. Audiences polled by CinemaScore gave the film an average grade of "B" on an A+ to F scale.

Variety's Robert Koehler gave the film a mixed review. He criticized the use of several flashbacks in the film, saying that it "[...] hinder[ed] the movie, ratcheting down its tension and pace". He explained, "A bigger problem lies with Leigh Whannell's script, which utilizes so many flashbacks and explanatory inserts that the tension, a defining feature of the first Saw, is lost". He did, however praise the acting. Roger Moore of the Orlando Sentinel gave it two out of five stars, criticizing the plot and acting.

The San Francisco Chronicle's Peter Hartlaub gave the film a negative review, criticizing the plot. Michael Ordoña of the Los Angeles Times said that "More gore is really all Saw III has to offer", Owen Gleiberman of Entertainment Weekly gave the film a "C". Empire's Kim Newman gave the film two out of five stars. He said the acting was "surprisingly good" but criticized the script and torture devices.

Saw III was nominated for a Saturn Award for Best Horror Film, but lost to The Descent. It was also nominated as the "Choice Movie: Horror/Thriller" at the Teen Choice Awards, but lost to Disturbia. Bell was nominated for a MTV Movie Award for Best Villain, but lost to Jack Nicholson for his role in The Departed.
