= Gregg Hoffman =

American film producer (1963–2005)

- Born: June 11, 1963; Phoenix, Arizona, U.S.
- Died: December 4, 2005 (aged 42); Los Angeles, California, U.S.
- Resting place: Mount Sinai Memorial Park Cemetery, Los Angeles, California
- Occupations: Producer; music supervisor
- Years active: 1991–2005
- Spouse: Lucienne Hoffman (before 2005)
- Children: 2

Gregg Hoffman (June 11, 1963 – December 4, 2005) was a film producer responsible for developing Saw and Saw II. He studied communications, law and economics at American University in Washington, D.C. Hoffman was working on Saw III and Crawlspace when he died in a hospital in Hollywood, California of natural causes. He was 42 years old at his death. The movie Dead Silence (2007) was dedicated to him. He was also thanked in the film Gross Misconduct, mentioned as dedicatee for Saw III, and posthumously credited with producing the Saw films from 2007 through 2023.

== Filmography ==
Year	Title	Role	Notes
1991	Scorchers	Music supervisor	
1992	Only You	Music supervisor and co-producer	
1993	Gross Misconduct	—N/a	Thanked
2003	George of the Jungle 2	Producer	
2004	Saw	Producer	
2005	Saw II	Producer	
2006	Saw III	Producer	Posthumous release
2007	Dead Silence	Producer	Posthumous release
2007	Catacombs	Producer	Posthumous release
