= Saw (film) =

2004 film by James Wan

- Theatrical release poster
- Directed by: James Wan
- Written by: Leigh Whannell
- Story by: James Wan; Leigh Whannell
- Produced by: Gregg Hoffman; Oren Koules; Mark Burg
- Starring: Cary Elwes; Danny Glover; Monica Potter; Michael Emerson; Ken Leung; Tobin Bell; Leigh Whannell
- Cinematography: David A. Armstrong
- Edited by: Kevin Greutert
- Music by: Charlie Clouser
- Production company: Twisted Pictures
- Distributed by: Lions Gate Films
- Release dates: January 19, 2004 (Sundance); October 29, 2004
- Running time: 103 minutes
- Country: United States
- Language: English
- Budget: $1–1.2 million
- Box office: $104 million

Saw is a 2004 American horror film directed by James Wan in his feature directorial debut, and written by Leigh Whannell, from a story by Wan and Whannell. It stars Whannell alongside Cary Elwes, Danny Glover, Monica Potter, Michael Emerson, and Ken Leung. The film tells a nonlinear narrative revolving around the mystery of the Jigsaw Killer, who tests his victims' will to live by putting them through deadly "games" where they must inflict great physical pain upon themselves to survive. The frame story follows Jigsaw's latest victims (Whannell and Elwes), who awaken in a large, dilapidated bathroom, with one being ordered to kill the other to save his own family.

The film was originally written in 2001, but after failed attempts to get the script produced in Wan and Whannell's home country of Australia, they were urged to travel to Los Angeles. In order to help attract producers, they shot a low-budget short film of the same name from a scene out of the script. This proved successful in 2003 as producers were immediately attached and also formed a horror genre production label, Twisted Pictures. The film was given a small production budget and was shot in 18 days.

Saw was first screened at the 2004 Sundance Film Festival on January 19, 2004. Due to positive audience reception, Lions Gate Films picked up the distribution rights for the film. Originally planned for a straight-to-video release, they decided to instead release the film in theaters in North America on October 29, 2004. The film received mixed reviews from critics. After topping the opening weekend box office, the film would go on to gross $104 million worldwide to become one of the most profitable horror films since Scream (1996). The success of Saw launched a media franchise, including several sequels, video games, theme park rides, and merchandising. The first sequel, titled Saw II, was released the following year in October 2005.

== Plot ==
Adam Stanheight, a photographer, awakens in a dilapidated bathtub with his ankle chained to a pipe. Across the room is oncologist Dr. Lawrence Gordon, and between them is the corpse of a suicide victim holding a revolver and a microcassette recorder. Both men find a tape in their pockets, and Adam retrieves the recorder. Adam's tape urges him to survive, while Lawrence's tape orders him to kill Adam by 6:00, or his wife, Alison, and daughter, Diana, will be murdered. After listening to the tapes, the duo uncovers a clue leading Adam to find a bag containing two hacksaws inside the toilet. Both men try to saw through their chains, but Adam's saw breaks. Lawrence realizes that the saws are intended for their feet, and identifies their captor as the Jigsaw Killer, a serial killer who tests his victims' will to survive through murderous contraptions known as "games"; Lawrence knows about him because he was once a suspect.

Five months prior, Lawrence, after discussing the terminal brain cancer of patient John Kramer with his medical interns, was interrogated by detectives David Tapp and Steven Sing, who found his penlight at the scene of one of Jigsaw's games. Lawrence's alibi cleared him, but he agreed to view the testimony of heroin addict Amanda Young, the only known survivor of one of Jigsaw's traps. Tapp and Sing later found Jigsaw's warehouse using the videotape from Amanda's game. There, they detained Jigsaw and saved a man from a trap, but Jigsaw managed to escape after he critically injured Tapp; Sing was killed by a shotgun trap.

In the present, Alison and Diana are tied up and gagged in their apartment, as their captor watches Adam and Lawrence through a hidden camera. The house is simultaneously watched by Tapp who, after being discharged from the police following Sing's death, has become obsessed with the Jigsaw case, and remains convinced that Lawrence is the killer. Meanwhile, Lawrence finds a box containing two cigarettes, a lighter, and a one-way cellphone. Adam asks Lawrence for the cigarette but Lawrence discourages this. He recounts his abduction in a parking garage by a pig-masked figure. Adam recalls his own abduction when he returned home to find a puppet in his darkroom, where he stored photos of Lawrence.

Held at gunpoint, Alison calls her husband and warns him not to trust Adam, who admits to Lawrence that he was paid by Tapp to spy on him, and reveals his knowledge of Lawrence's affair with one of his medical students whom he had visited on the night of his abduction. Lawrence deduces that the affair is the reason why he is being tested. Adam finds a photo of Alison and Diana's captor, whom Lawrence identifies as Zep Hindle, an orderly at his hospital.

Zep, seeing that Lawrence has still not killed Adam, moves to murder Alison and Diana while Lawrence listens, but Alison frees herself and fights him. The struggle attracts Tapp's attention, and he saves Alison and Diana before chasing Zep to the sewers, where he is shot in the chest after a brief fight. Lawrence, only aware of the gunshots and screaming, is shocked but cannot reach his cell phone. In desperation, he saws off his foot and shoots Adam with the corpse's revolver. Zep enters the bathroom to kill Lawrence, but Adam, having survived the gunshot, bludgeons him to death with the toilet tank lid. Lawrence crawls out of the bathroom to find help while Adam searches Zep's body for a key. He finds another tape, which reveals that Zep was just another victim of Jigsaw, following rules to obtain the antidote for a slow-acting poison in his body.

The "corpse" lying in the room suddenly rises to its feet; it turns out to be John Kramer, who is the real Jigsaw Killer. John tells Adam that the key to his chain was in the bathtub; it went down the drain when Adam had first awoken and drained the water. Adam attempts to shoot John with Zep's gun, but John electrically shocks him through his chain. John exits the bathroom before sealing the door, leaving Adam alone to die.

== Cast ==
- Leigh Whannell as Adam
- Cary Elwes as Dr. Lawrence Gordon
- Danny Glover as Detective David Tapp
- Ken Leung as Detective Steven Sing
- Dina Meyer as Kerry
- Mike Butters as Paul
- Paul Gutrecht as Mark
- Michael Emerson as Zep Hindle
- Benito Martinez as Brett
- Shawnee Smith as Amanda
- Makenzie Vega as Diana Gordon
- Monica Potter as Alison Gordon
- Ned Bellamy as Jeff
- Alexandra Chun as Carla
- Tobin Bell as Jigsaw

== Production ==
=== Development and writing ===
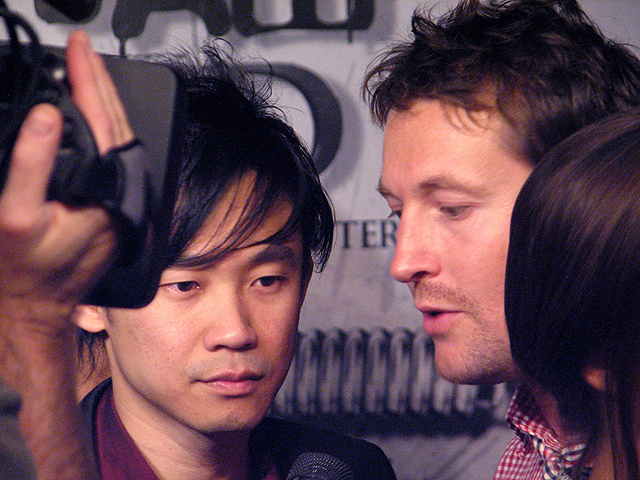
Wan (left) and Whannell (right)

After finishing film school, Australian director James Wan and Australian writer Leigh Whannell wanted to write and fund a film. The inspiration that they needed came after watching the low-budget independent film The Blair Witch Project. Another film that inspired them to finance the film themselves was Darren Aronofsky's Pi. The two thought the cheapest script to shoot would involve two actors in one room. Whannell said, "So I actually think the restrictions we had on our bank accounts at the time, the fact that we wanted to keep the film contained, helped us come up with the ideas in the film." One idea was to have the entire film set with two actors stuck in an elevator and being shot in the point of view of security cameras.

Wan pitched the idea to Whannell of two men chained to opposite sides of a bathroom with a dead body in the middle of the floor and they are trying to figure out why and how they are there. By the end of the film, they realize the person lying on the floor is not dead and he is the reason they are locked in the room. Whannell initially did not give Wan the reaction he was looking for. He said, "I'll never forget that day. I remember hanging up the phone and started just going over it in my head, and without any sort of long period of pondering, I opened my diary that I had at the time and wrote the word 'Saw'." Before writing the word "Saw" in a blood-red, dripping font, the two had not come up with a title. "It was one of those moments that made me aware that some things just really are meant to be. Some things are just waiting there to be discovered", Whannell said.

The character of Jigsaw did not come until months later, when Whannell was working at a job he was unhappy with and began having migraines. Convinced it was a brain tumor, he went to a neurologist to have an MRI; and, while sitting nervously in the waiting room, he thought: What if you were given the news that you had a tumor and you were going to die soon? How would you react to that? He imagined the character Jigsaw having been given one or two years to live and combined that with the idea of Jigsaw putting others in a literal version of the situation but only giving them a few minutes to choose their fate. Wan did not intend to make a "torture porn" film, and the script only had one short segment of torture. He said the film "played out like a mystery thriller". It was not until the sequels that the plot focused more on torture scenes.

=== Funding and short film ===
Whannell and Wan initially had $30,000 to spend on the film, but as the script developed it was clear that more funds would be needed. The script was optioned by a producer in Sydney for a year but the deal eventually fell through. After other failed attempts to get the script produced in Australia from 2001 to 2002, literary agent Ken Greenblatt read the script and suggested they travel to Los Angeles, where their chances of finding an interested studio were greater. Wan and Whannell initially refused due to lack of traveling funds, but the pair's agent, Stacey Testro, convinced them to go. In order to help studios take interest in the script, Whannell provided A$5,000 (US$5,000) to make a short film based on the script's jaw trap scene, which they thought would prove most effective. Whannell played David, the man wearing the reverse bear trap. Working at the Australian Broadcasting Corporation, Whannell and Wan knew cameramen who were willing to provide technical assistance for the short.

I guess the term 'torture-porn' doesn't affect me one way or the other. I don't love the term, nor do I really hate it. For me, it's kind of hard to have any bad feelings about the term, because I guess torture-porn has given me a lot of good things, like being able to work in the film industry and work as a screenwriter. I guess I'm just thankful to be part of a film that made it, and anything after that is just a champagne problem.

— Leigh Whannell (screenwriter) on his feelings of the film being labeled "torture porn".

Wan shot the short with a 16mm camera over two days and transferred the footage to DVDs to ship along with the script. Whannell wanted to play the lead character in the feature film. The short helped show that Wan and Whannell were a "director-actor team" rather than just wanting to sell the script. Wan said, "Leigh and I just loved the project so much and we wanted a career in filmmaking so we stuck to our guns and said, 'Look, guys, if you want this project, we're coming on board—Leigh has to act in it and I have to direct it.'"

In early 2003, while in Los Angeles and before they met with producer Gregg Hoffman, Hoffman's friend pulled him into his office and showed him the short. Hoffman said, "About two or three minutes into it, my jaw hit the floor." He quickly showed the short and script to his partners Mark Burg and Oren Koules of Evolution Entertainment. They later formed Twisted Pictures as a horror genre production label. The producers read the screenplay that night and two days later offered Wan and Whannell creative control and 25% of the net profits. Even though Wan and Whannell received "better offers" from studios like DreamWorks Pictures and Gold Circle Films, they were not willing to chance Wan's directing and Whannell acting in the lead role. In order to finance the film, Hoffman, Burg, and Koules put up a second mortgage on their Highland Avenue headquarters. Saw was given a production budget of between $1 million and $1.2 million. (Note: Sources for the budget figure vary. Some publications put the budget at $1 million, $1.15 million and $1.2 million.)

=== Casting ===
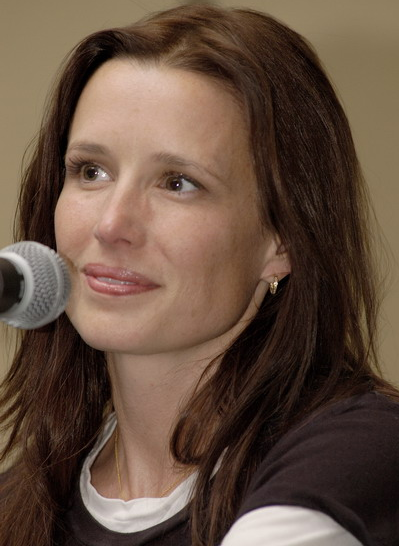
Smith shot her scenes in one day, which Wan described as "physically taxing".

Cary Elwes was sent the short film on DVD and immediately became interested in playing Dr. Lawrence Gordon in the film. He read the script in one sitting and was drawn in by the "uniqueness and originality" of the story. Koules was Elwes' manager at the time. To prepare for his role as an oncologist, he met with a doctor at UCLA's Department of Neurosurgery. In August 2005, Elwes filed a lawsuit against his management firm and producers of Saw, Evolution Entertainment, alleging "breach of contract and unjust enrichment". Elwes said that he was promised that he would receive a minimum of one percent of the producers' net profits from the film and did not. Elwes claims he only received $53,275 and a salary of $2,587.20. The case was later settled out of court and Elwes reprised his role five years later in Saw 3D.

Shawnee Smith, who is not a horror fan, initially refused the role of Amanda Young, describing the script as "horrific". However, after watching the short, she agreed to the role, which was the part that Whannell portrayed in the short. Wan offhandly suggested Smith when his casting director asked who he wanted to play Amanda, as he had had a crush on Smith since his teenage years, and was surprised when his casting director secured her on the role. Danny Glover was cast as Detective David Tapp, who is in pursuit of the Jigsaw Killer. Glover stated in an interview, "Something about that detective character at that particular point attracted me to it". Michael Emerson felt drawn to accept the role of Orderly Zep Hindle due to finding the film's writing "masterful" and its twist ending "jaw-dropping", deeming it the "best ending of a piece of film writing [he] had ever seen".

On taking the role of Jigsaw, Tobin Bell said, "I did Saw because I thought it was a fascinating location for a film to be made. These guys locked in a room, to me, was fresh. I did not anticipate the ending when I read the script, so I was quite caught by surprise and it was clear to me that if the filmmakers shot the scene well, the audience would be caught by surprise as well. The film was worth doing for that moment alone". Bell also stated that he wanted to take the opportunity to work with Glover, with whom he had never previously worked. Wan primarily cast Bell because of his voice. Mike Butters was originally offered the role of Jigsaw, but declined as he felt that that role did not have enough exciting scenes. Butters, a friend of one of the producers whom he used to play hockey with, ended up cast as Paul Leahy, the Jigsaw victim who perishes in a razor wire maze trap.

=== Filming and post-production ===
With a shooting budget of $700,000, Saw began principal photography on September 22, 2003, at Lacy Street Production Facility in Los Angeles for 18 days. The bathroom was the only set that had to be built. There were no chairs on the set. Other sets like the police station were shot in locations where other productions had built similar sets. The bathtub scene was filmed the first day of filming, and it was then that Whannell realized that they didn't have money left in the budget to hire a stuntman to shoot the scene, forcing him to perform the scene himself. It took six days to shoot all the scenes in the bathroom, and these were filmed chronologically to avoid continuity jumps and help the actors stay in character. To film the scenes of the two protagonists, Wan made sure most of Dr. Gordon's shots were very steady and controlled while Adam's shots were shaky and handheld to match the characters' personalities. Instead of using a camera dolly or a tripod, cinematographer David A. Armstrong shot the entire film with the camera over his shoulder.

There was no time for Elwes and Whannell to rehearse their scenes together to not conflict with the schedules of Glover and Emerson, who were only available for a certain number of days. Glover completed his scenes in two days. Emerson found the shoot "punishing", but a "real adventure" he was glad to survive. According to Elwes, his dialogue averaged 12 to 16 pages a day, which he considered a great challenge. Due to the tight shooting schedule, Wan could not afford to shoot more than a couple of takes per actor. "It was a really tough struggle for me. Every day, it was me fighting to get the shots I did not get. I had high aspirations, but there's only so much you can do. I wanted to make it in a very Hitchcockian style of filmmaking, but that style of filmmaking takes time to set up and so on", Wan said about the very short shooting schedule. He said the style instead ended up being "more gritty and rough around the edges due to the lack of time and money that we had to shoot the movie with" and it ultimately became the aesthetic of the film.

$400 were spent on reshoots Wan and Whannell did on their own. For the reshoots, Whannell served as a stand-in to Smith and Ken Leung in the scenes of Amanda searching for her key and of Steven Sing entering into Jigsaw's lair. In post-production, Wan found he did not have enough shots or takes to work with as he was basically shooting rehearsals. Having a lot of missing gaps in the final product, he and editor Kevin Greutert created shots to mend together during editing, such as making a shot look like a surveillance camera feed and using still photographs. "We did a lot of things to fill in gaps throughout the film. Whatever we cut to newspaper clippings and stuff like that, or we cut to surveillance cameras, or we cut to still photography within the film, which now people say, 'Wow, that's such a cool experimental style of filmmaking', we really did that out of necessity to fill in gaps we did not get during the filming", he explained.

== Release ==
Lions Gate picked up Saw's worldwide distribution rights at the 2004 Sundance Film Festival days before the film premiered on January 19, 2004. There it played to a packed theater for three midnight showings to a positive reaction. It was the closing film at the Toronto International Film Festival on September 18, 2004. Lionsgate initially planned to release the film direct-to-video, but due to the positive reaction at Sundance, they chose to release it theatrically by Halloween. It was released on October 1, 2004, in the United Kingdom, October 29, 2004, in the United States and December 2, 2004, in Australia. The film was initially rated NC-17 (No One 17 and Under Admitted) by the Motion Picture Association of America for strong graphic violence, though after being re-edited, it was released with an R rating. Lionsgate held a blood drive for the Red Cross called "Give Til It Hurts" and collected 4,249 pints of blood.

On October 31, 2014, for the film's tenth anniversary, Saw was re-released to select theaters for one week. The release earned $650,051 in its opening weekend, and is the third lowest-grossing wide opening, fourth after the Toy Story re-release in 2020. At the end of its run, the release had grossed $815,324, bringing the film's overall domestic gross to $56,000,369. For its 20th anniversary in 2024, Fathom Events set a theatrical release of the unrated version on October 20 and 23.

=== Soundtrack ===
Saw's soundtrack was mainly composed by Charlie Clouser, and took six weeks to complete. Other songs were performed by Front Line Assembly, Fear Factory, Enemy, Pitbull Daycare and Psychopomps. Megadeth's song "Die Dead Enough" was originally set to be featured in the film but was not used for undisclosed reasons.

The soundtrack was released on October 5, 2004 by Koch Records. Johnny Loftus of AllMusic gave it three out of five stars. He said that Clouser "really nails it with his creaky, clammy score" and that he "understands that Saw's horror only works with a heady amount of camp, and he draws from industrial music in the same way". He particularly liked, "Cigarette"; "Hello, Adam"; and "F**k This S*!t", commenting that they "blend chilling sounds with harsh percussion and deep-wound keyboard stabs".

=== Home media ===
The theatrical version of the film was released on VHS and DVD on February 15, 2005, in the United States and Canada. After its first week, it made $9.4 million in DVD rentals and $1.7 million in VHS rentals, making it the top rental of the week. For the second week it remained as the number one DVD rental with $6.8 million, for a $16.27 million two-week total. It dropped to third place in VHS rentals with $1.09 million, for a $2.83 million two-week total. The film went on to sell more than $70 million worth of video and DVDs. A two-disc "Uncut Edition" was released on October 18, 2005 to tie in with the release of Saw II. The short film, also entitled Saw (and informally referred to as Saw 0.5), was included on the DVD. The film was later released on Blu-ray on June 27, 2006. On May 11, 2021, Saw was released on Ultra HD Blu-ray with a new 2160p transfer and a new 58 minute making-of documentary.

== Reception ==
=== Box office ===
Saw opened at number three on Halloween weekend 2004 in 2,315 theaters and grossed $18.2 million, behind Ray ($20 million) and The Grudge ($21.8 million). According to Lionsgate's exit poll, 60% of the mostly male audience was under 25 years of age. Saw had also become Lionsgate's second best opening, after Fahrenheit 9/11's $23.9 million (2004). On its second weekend, an additional 152 theaters were added, bringing the theater count to 2,467. It dropped to number four, making $11 million, a 39% drop from the opening weekend.

Saw opened in the United Kingdom to $2.2 million in 301 theaters, grossing a $12.3 million total in seven weeks. In Australia, it opened in 161 theaters with $1.2 million and totaled out to $3.1 million in six weeks. In Italy, the film opened on January 14, 2005, in 267 theaters to $1.7 million and grossed $6.4 million in six weeks. Saw opened to $1.5 million from 187 theaters in France on March 16, 2005, and made $3.1 million by the end of its four-week run. Saw came to gross $55.1 million in the United States and Canada and $47.9 million in other markets for a worldwide total of $104 million. At the time, it became the most profitable horror film after Scream (1996).

=== Critical response ===
On the review aggregator website Rotten Tomatoes, 50% of 194 critics' reviews are positive, with an average rating of 5.8/10. The website's consensus reads: "Saw ensnares audiences with a deceptively clever plot and a myriad of memorable, nasty set pieces, but its lofty ambitions are undercut by a nihilistic streak that feels more mean than profound." Metacritic, which uses a weighted average, assigned the film a score of 46 out of 100, based on 32 critics, indicating "mixed or average" reviews. Audiences polled by CinemaScore gave the film an average grade of "C+" on an A+ to F scale.

Dennis Harvey of Variety gave the film a negative review after its Sundance premiere. He called it a "crude concoction sewn together from the severed parts of prior horror/serial killer pics". He called the screenplay "convoluted", criticizing the use of "flashbacks within flashbacks" and red herrings. He described the film as being "too hyperbolic to be genuinely disturbing". Carla Meyer of the San Francisco Chronicle gave the film a positive review, saying the film "combined B-movie acting with a twisted mind-set and visual tricks designed to camouflage cheap effects" and that it was "terrifying at some moments and insinuatingly creepy at many others." She called the killing scenes "amazingly evocative for such a low-budget movie".

Empire's Kim Newman gave the film four out of five stars. He said Saw is styled like early David Fincher films and "boasts an intricate structure—complex flashbacks-within-flashbacks explain how the characters have come to this crisis—and a satisfying mystery to go with its ghastly claustrophobia." He ended his review saying, "As good an all-out, non-camp horror movie as we've had lately." Owen Gleiberman of Entertainment Weekly gave the film a B minus, calling it "derivative and messy and too nonsensical for its own good." He described Jigsaw's intent as "to show you the serial killer lurking inside yourself". Gleiberman criticized Elwes' performance by saying, "[Elwes] ought to be featured in a seminar on the perils of overacting. He compared the plot to Seven saying, "In a blatant imitation of Seven, Saw features a lunatic sadist whose ghoulish crimes are meant, in each case, to mirror the sins of his victims. The twist here is that the psycho doesn't do the killing." Daniel M. Kimmel of the Telegram & Gazette called it "one of the most loathsome films this critic has seen in more than 20 years on the job".

The New York Times's Stephen Holden gave a mixed review, saying the film "does a better-than-average job of conveying the panic and helplessness of men terrorized by a sadist in a degrading environment, but it is still not especially scary. What sets its demon apart from run-of-the-mill movie serial killers is his impulse to humiliate and torture his victims and justify it with some twisted morality." He said the film is "seriously undermined by the half-baked, formulaic detective story in which the horror is framed." Carina Chocano of the Los Angeles Times also gave the film a mixed review, saying, "Saw is so full of twists it ends up getting snarled. For all of his flashy engineering and inventive torture scenarios, the Jigsaw Killer comes across as an amateur. Hannibal Lecter would have him for lunch." She said the film "carelessly underscores its own shaky narrative at every turn with its mid-budget hokiness". She also noted that Elwes and Whannell had trouble keeping an American accent. Another mixed review came from Roger Ebert, who gave the film 2 out of 4 stars and lamented the gimmicks and plot contrivances but nonetheless described Saw as "well made and acted, and does what it does about as well as it could be expected to".

Richard J. Leskosky of Champaign-Urbana's The News-Gazette said, "Saw wants to be taken as another Seven. Though it features perverse gross-out scenes and a villain with a superficially pedantic motive behind his crimes (his victims, if they survive, have learned to appreciate life more), it lacks the finesse and polish of the David Fincher film." When asked if the 1995 thriller film Seven was an inspiration to Saw, Whannell said, "For me as the writer, definitely. I mean, Seven is just a very well constructed film, and if you're writing a thriller, it can't hurt to study it. In terms of the story though, James and I never really felt Seven was that close to our film. I guess if you stand back, you have two detectives chasing a psychopath, who uses vile methods to teach people lessons, and those points echo Seven. What we always liked about Saw, though, was that the story is told from the point of view of two of the psychopath's victims, instead of the police chasing after him, as you so often see."

Bloody Disgusting ranked the film tenth in its list of the Top 20 Horror Films of the decade, with the article calling Saw "perhaps the most influential horror film of the decade". The Daily Telegraph listed the film number 14 on their Top 100 list that defined the 2000s. The film was nominated for best horror film at the 31st Saturn Awards.
