= List of Scream Queens (2008 TV series) episodes =

The following is an episode list for the 2008 reality series Scream Queens. Season one of the series premiered on VH1 on October 20, 2008 in the United States. Season two premiered on August 2, 2010.

== Series overview ==
Season	Episodes	Originally released	
Season	Episodes	First released	Last released
1	8	October 20, 2008	December 8, 2008
2	8	August 2, 2010	September 27, 2010

== Episodes ==
=== Season 1 (2008) ===
No.	Title	Original release date	Prod. code
1	"Episode 1"	October 20, 2008	101
Debut: Ten aspiring actresses are competing to become the next Scream Queen and win a role in Saw VI. In the first competition, they have to beg for their lives in front of a chainsaw wielding maniac. Series judges Shawnee Smith (the Saw franchise), James Gunn (writer/director of Slither and writer of Dawn of the Dead), and John Homa (acting coach to the stars) determine who will stay and who will get "The Axe".
2	"Episode 2"	October 27, 2008	102
Shawnee Smith, along with casting director Kelly Wagner, evaluate the girls on their first impressions and send two of them off for make-overs. The director's challenge is a movie poster photo shoot, where the girls get tested on their ability to sell a film with a single look.
3	"Episode 3"	November 3, 2008	103
In this week's challenge, the eight remaining actresses must leap out of a three story window.
4	"Episode 4"	November 10, 2008	104
The seven remaining actresses are asked to participate in a challenge involving the campy and comedic side of horror. After a "skills test" where the girls play a character with no body, they must compete against one another for roles in a horror movie trailer directed by series judge James Gunn and guest starring his brother, Sean Gunn.
5	"Episode 5"	November 17, 2008	105
In a sequence of challenges, each actress must dive into a pool of simulated blood and gore, get into a body drawer in a morgue, and finally, cover herself with thousands of cockroaches.
6	"Episode 6"	November 24, 2008	106
The five remaining actresses must focus on the "altered states" of horror. The girls must act as though they have been possessed. At the Director's Challenge the girls must act as blood-sucking vampires.
7	"Episode 7"	December 1, 2008	107
The four remaining actresses must act out their final moments during a "Blair Witch" challenge.
8	"Episode 8 (Finale)"	December 8, 2008	108
For the penultimate challenge, the remaining contestants compete in "The Scream Queen gauntlet". The loser of the immediately gets "The Axe" and the remaining two face off in one final Director's Challenge that will determine which one has earned a role in Saw VI.

=== Episode Progress (Season 1) ===
Placing	Queens	1	2	3	4	5	6	7	8	
1	Tanedra	IN	IN	IN	IN	WIN	IN	LOW	IN	WINNER
2	Michelle	HIGH	IN	LOW	WIN	HIGH	WIN	HIGH	IN	AXED
3	Lindsay	IN	WIN	IN	IN	LOW	LOW	WIN	AXED	
4	Angela	IN	IN	IN	LOW	HIGH	HIGH	AXED		
5	Jessica	LOW	IN	MID	IN	MID	AXED			
6	Sarah	WIN	IN	MID	IN	AXED				
7	Lina	IN	MID	WIN	AXED					
8	Marissa	IN	LOW	AXED						
9	Kylah	LOW	AXED							
10	Jo-Anne	AXED								
Challenge Winner:		Tanedra	Jessica	Tanedra	Lindsay	Tanedra	Michelle	Lindsay	-	Tanedra

The contestant won Scream Queens.
The contestant was named that week's Leading Lady.
The contestant was called to the ballroom for very good performance but was not named the Leading Lady.
The contestant was called to the ballroom for both good and bad performance.
The contestant was called to the ballroom for bad performance but was not eliminated.
The contestant was eliminated (axed).

=== Season 2 (2010) ===
On August 12, 2009, VH1 began casting for a second season of Scream Queens. Season 2 began shooting in November 2009 and premiered in August 2010, with the winner gaining a role in Saw 3D also known as Saw VII, the next entry in the Saw franchise. Jaime King replaced Shawnee Smith as mentor and host, while Tim Sullivan replaced James Gunn as the director.

No.	Title	Original release date	Prod. code	Viewers (millions)
1	"Episode 1"	August 2, 2010	201	0.309
In the season premiere of Scream Queens, ten new aspiring actresses begin the journey for the breakout role in Saw 3D. The girls' very first challenge is a living nightmare, as they have to portray fear in an A Nightmare on Elm Street-inspired scene. Gabby is chosen as the best in that scene, giving her immunity from elimination. The following day, the girls meet John for their first acting class, where they learn they must convey pure rage, and "fight back against the killer" via the medium of smashing pumpkins with a baseball bat. Later, the girls meet Jaime who reveals that for their Director's challenge, they will be starring in a fake teaser for a film called Kiss of the Devil, in which they will act out three scenes: a seductive scene, a scene portraying fear and a scene conveying rage. After the challenge, the contestants find out — via "the list" — the girls summoned to the grand ballroom: Jessica, Tai, Gabby, Sierra & Lana. At the ceremony, Jessica and Tai are praised for their performances, with Jessica being chosen as the Leading Lady. Gabby, although safe is scolded for her weak performance in the Director's challenge. Sierra and Lana performed the worst this week, for Sierra's overacting and Lana's not being able to connect emotionally. In the end, Sierra is saved, while Lana gets "The Axe" making her the first casualty of the season.
2	"Episode 2"	August 9, 2010	202	0.345
This week the nine remaining contestants tap into their dark sides as they play the villain, and must portray evil. For their skills test, Jaime informs the girls that they will be portraying witches in addition to choosing their own wardrobe. Most of the girls do well, but Rosanna and Sierra struggle. Jaime announces Christine as the winner, for her modern gothic interpretation, giving her immunity from elimination. Later the girls meet with John for another acting class, where he tells them that real "bad girls" can embody evil just using words. For this exercise, the girls pair up and one of them is the "bad girl." That girl must communicate to the other her intent to kill her. Firstly they can only use the letters of the alphabet, starting from A, then they have to say how they're going to kill them. Most girls succeed with the task while Sierra, Sarah & Rosanna struggle. The next day, the girls meet Tim for their Director's challenge. He reveals that they will be playing a homicidal girlfriend who plans on killing her boyfriend while cooking dinner. The girls have to play innocent at first and slowly reveal the fact that the character is evil. The girls also learn that their co-star for the scene is award-winning actor and model Trevor Wright. Later that night, the contestants find out — via "the list" — the girls summoned to the grand ballroom: Tai, Rosanna, Sarah, Sierra & Gabby. At the elimination ceremony, Gabby and Tai are lauded by the judges for their good performances. Tai is told by the judges that although she is consistent, she needs to wow them now and be great, while Gabby is awarded Leading Lady. The judges tell Sarah that although she has movie star looks, she needs to bring that quality to her acting, and she is safe. Sierra and Rosanna form the bottom two this week, both for their inability to convey evil. In the end, Sierra is again spared, while Rosanna gets "The Axe" for being too sweet and holding back.
3	"Episode 3"	August 16, 2010	203	0.341
This week the eight remaining actresses are asked to convey true "Scream Queen" emotions without using words. For their skills test the girls use motion capture technology to transfer their movements to a digitally animated character, a puppet that magically comes to life and escapes out the window before its owner finds out. The challenge is to convey real emotions with just body language. Most of the girls do well, but Sierra wins the challenge and a guaranteed callback for her real performance. Later the contestants meet with John for their acting class, where they learn that they have to cry on cue without sobbing. All the girls fail to shed a tear at first, until Homa tells them that having a specific thought is needed to cry effectively. All the girls complete the task successfully with the exception of Karlie. That night the girls receive a message from a creepy mime telling them that they will be working with live maggots at their next Director's challenge, much to Tai and Sarah's disdain. The following day, the girls meet with Tim for their third Director's challenge. Sullivan tells the girls that the set being used for this challenge is the house used by Rob Zombie to shoot the 2007 remake of Halloween, and that although this week is void of words, they will be able to utter one word "No", to convey different emotions. For the scene, the girls each return to home to find their house in a mess, where they eventually find the decomposing body of a loved one. While kneeling next to the body they are lightly hit on the top of the head, and when they look up, thousands of maggots come raining down on them from a large cocoon. Most of the girls excel with the exception of Sarah and Karlie who struggle. Later that evening, the contestants find out — via "the list" — the girls summoned to the grand ballroom: Karlie, Sierra, Allison & Sarah. At the elimination ceremony, Sierra and Allison are both called up for outstanding performances this week, Sierra for listening to the judges and greatly improving from past weeks and Allison for her exceptional performance in the Director's challenge. Even though Allison performed well this week, Sierra is awarded Leading Lady for her improvement and great performance in the Director's challenge. Sarah and Karlie make up the bottom 2 as they performed the worst this week. Karlie for being too over-the-top at times in her performances and for being too anxious, and Sarah for not being focused during the Director's challenge and not fighting hard enough. In the end, Sarah is saved while Karlie gets "The Axe".
4	"Episode 4"	August 23, 2010	204	0.314
The competition heats up as the seven remaining actresses take on the sexy side of horror. For their skills test the girls meet up with Jaime at a photo studio, where they are introduced to 90's scream queen Debbie Rochon who is also the producer for Fangoria magazine. For their challenge, each girl will portray an iconic female horror character in a sexy photo shoot. The winner will receive a guaranteed callback and a layout in Fangoria. The girls' characters are assigned as follows: Allison as The Mother of Demon Child; Christine as The Wicked School Girl; Gabby as The Girl in the Shower; Jessica as The Evil Nurse; Sarah as The Serial Killer; Sierra as The Girl Alone on Phone; Tai as The Bride of Frankenstein; Although most of the girls do well except for Sierra and Tai who struggle to bring out their characters, Sarah is chosen as the winner for sexy and dark photograph, and wins a guaranteed callback and the spread in Fangoria. After announcing the winner, Jaime reveals that Sierra and Christine will be getting makeovers much to Christine's chagrin. Christine's hair is made fuller and redder, while Sierra gets a shorter bob. Later the girls meet with John Homa for their acting class, where they learn that they have to make margaritas using as much sexuality as possible. When most of the girls fail the first time, Homa tells them that subtlety is the key to seduction. In the evening, the girls receive the scripts for the Director's challenge from a strange "exotic dancer" where they learn they will be working with a large python for their scene. The following day, the girls meet with Tim on the set of their fourth Director's challenge where he reveals their co-star, a large yellow python named Bruce. Tim tells the girls about their scene which has each girl playing a stripper — who is actually half-snake — sensually performing for a male client (Bru Miller) before she kills him. Most of the girls do okay except for Allison and Gabby. Later that evening, the contestants find out — via "the list" — the girls summoned to the grand ballroom: Jessica, Gabby & Allison. At the elimination ceremony Jessica is called up first and is commended on her maturity and her ability to excel at Tim's re-directions, she is awarded Leading Lady for her exceptional performance and star quality. Allison and Gabby are deemed the worst performers this week and form the bottom 2. Gabby for her horrible Director's challenge and inconsistency and Allison for her strange facial expressions and overacting in the Director's challenge. After saying that it is a tough decision, Jaime announces that Gabby gets a callback this week for her moments of brilliance, while Allison gets "The Axe".
5	"Episode 5"	August 30, 2010	205	0.318
The six remaining actresses realize that playing scary is not always easy, but comedy is even harder as they take on the campy side of horror this week. At their skills test, Jaime tells the girls that from this point on there are no guaranteed callbacks and that no one is safe. The girls will be playing zombies breaking out of their tombs to look for brains. Christine and Sierra tried to deliver serious performances but came off too silly. Jessica played it safe and goes for a conventional zombie, Sarah tried out a "zombie rocker" but failed to impress, Tai portrayed a real brain hungry zombie and Gabby focused too much on hitting her mark. Afterward, Tai is announced as the winner. Later that afternoon, the girls meet with Homa for their acting class where they are introduced to Joe Wengert of the Upright Citizens Brigade sketch comedy group. For the class, the girls will perform various monster-based improvisational scenes in pairs, the basic premise being a world where monsters are regular people. Christine and Tai are up first. For their scene, Tai will play a meter maid giving Frankenstein — Christine — a ticket, then they switch roles, as will all the girls. Christine misses the mark slightly playing Frankenstein. Next are Sierra and Jessica. Sierra plays a mummy getting fitted for a wedding dress by Jessica. Sierra overacts and comes off "cartoonish" as the mummy. Lastly are Sarah and Gabby. Gabby as a werewolf, and Sarah as a worker at a taco stand. Both girls have trouble playing the werewolf character, Gabby kept laughing while Sarah made strange choices for her character. Later that evening, a trail of chattering teeth lead the girls to a "vampire" who delivers their scripts for the Director's challenge. The girls realize that they will be all acting together in the same scene. The next day, the girls meet Tim on a backlot at Universal Studios to film their Director's challenge. Tim reveals that the girls will star in a fake movie trailer about western vampire outlaws, and that they will have their own individual characters. The girls' characters are assigned as follows: Christine as Victoria, a Vampire Outlaw; Gabby as Bethany, the Sexy Vampire; Jessica as Barbara, the Tough Vampire; Sarah as Vivian, a Vampire Outlaw; Sierra as Beatrice, the Nerdy Vampire; Tai as Betty, the Vampire Leader; Christine and Sarah go first, and Christine has trouble playing a tough outlaw. Next is Sierra who also has some trouble bringing menace to her nerdy character. Gabby is next and technical details almost threaten her performance again, but she pulls through on the second take. In the next scene Gabby has to dunk Sarah’s head in a trough of water. Sarah has trouble coping with the cold and the water, and that combined with her anxiety produces a weak performance. Jessica goes next and nails her scene quickly. Last to do her scene is Tai, who also gives a strong performance quickly. Later that evening, the contestants find out — via "the list" — the girls summoned to the grand ballroom: Christine, Sarah, Gabby & Sierra, although this time, the list also reveals that Tai is Leading Lady. At the elimination ceremony, it is revealed that all the girls were summoned for poor performance. Christine is called up first, for playing it safe and becoming mediocre in her performances. Next is Sarah, because the judges feel like she has reached the limits of her range and for not progressing quickly enough. Gabby is chastised only for technical issues and her disastrous skills test performance. Lastly, the judges tell Sierra she needs to add more “depth” to her characters, because they all come across over-the-top and one-note. After critiquing all of them, Jaime reveals that Sarah is getting "The Axe".
6	"Episode 6"	September 13, 2010	206	0.231
This week, the final five girls must learn to act with "nothing". First for their skills test with Jaime, she tells them that they must act in front of a green screen, playing a character who faces a giant, Godzilla-type monster from a high window. Jamie also tells them they need to hit their technical marks to make the scene effective, first looking up to admire the view, then down to observe people on the street, and finally face-to-face with the monster. Christine goes first, and "plays it safe" according to Sierra. Jessica goes next and does a good job. Tai is up next, but she overacts through most of it. After her is Sierra, who doesn't give her best performance. Gabby goes last and nails her scene. Jaime announces Gabby as the winner, but also scolds Tai for her overacting. During the director's challenge, the girls must act as if they're being attacked by a ghost, moving their limbs freely before getting pulled by a cable out of the shot. Jessica goes first, giving another strong performance. After her is Christine, who blows away everyone with her great performance, commended for looking like her limbs were attached to wires, the way she moved. Up next is Gabby, who overall gives a very good performance. Tai follows, and overacts again. Last is Sierra, who makes several terrible choices in her scene, and the girls (and the director) are left laughing. Jessica wins leading lady and she and Gabby are safe and not called to the grand ballroom. Tai, Christine, and Sierra are. The judges tell Christine she would have won leading lady if not for her inconsistency at the beginning of the week, but also say she blew them away and did an amazing job. Sierra and Tai are scolded for their overacting and bad decisions. It is announced that this week is a split decision and that this is the hardest decision the judges have ever had to make, but in the end Sierra gets "The Axe."
7	"Episode 7"	September 20, 2010	207	0.345
This week, the four remaining actresses learn to work in 'altered states.' In the skills test, they must act like they've been possessed by a demon, who, before she died, was known as the town tramp. Gabby goes more traditional, Jessica tries an attempt to be a sex-crazed ghost by pretending to seduce herself. Christine goes for the same thing, but becomes too vulgar with it. Tai however, wins the skills test, commended for staying in-character from beginning to end. During Homa's class, they must act like they're drunk, each having a different scenario. After a couple shots, Christine is commended for her believable performance and sent to sit down. All of them do fairly well except Gabby, who is given a second chance after everyone is done. She does well, but Jessica has a meltdown, complaining that, "...it's not fair that they get to go again!" During the director's challenge, the girls must this time act as a psycho living in the mental hospital, who kills her victims with a thin string because it 'turns her on.' Jessica & Gabby are both commended for their terrifying and realistic performances. Christine & Tai fall flat, Christine making a bad decision but going through with it, and Tai making too many decisions. All four girls are sent to the grand ballroom, where Gabby & Jessica are told they had the best performances, and Gabby wins leading lady. Tai & Christine are both sent up for poor performances, but Tai gets "The Axe."
8	"Episode 8"	September 27, 2010	208	0.336
Gabby West is chosen for the role in Saw 3D.

=== Episode Progress (Season 2) ===
Placing	Queens	1	2	3	4	5	6	7	8	
1	Gabby	LOW	WIN	IN	LOW	LOW	IN	WIN	IN	WINNER
2	Jessica	WIN	IN	IN	WIN	IN	WIN	HIGH	IN	AXED
3	Christine	IN	IN	IN	IN	LOW	HIGH	LOW	AXED	
4	Tai	HIGH	HIGH	IN	IN	WIN	LOW	AXED		
5	Sierra	LOW	LOW	WIN	IN	LOW	AXED			
6	Sarah	IN	MID	LOW	IN	AXED				
7	Allison	IN	IN	HIGH	AXED					
8	Karlie	IN	IN	AXED						
9	Rosanna	IN	AXED							
10	Lana	AXED								
Challenge Winner:		Gabby	Christine	Sierra	Sarah	Tai	Gabby	Tai*	-	Gabby

The contestant won Scream Queens.
The contestant was named that week's Leading Lady.
The contestant was called to the ballroom for very good performance but was not named the Leading Lady.
The contestant was called to the ballroom for both good and bad performance.
The contestant was called to the ballroom for bad performance but was not eliminated.
The contestant was eliminated (axed).

- In episode 7, Tai wasn't immune from the elimination
