= List of Scream Queens episodes =

List of Scream Queens episodes may refer to:

- List of Scream Queens (2008 TV series) episodes, episode list for the 2008 VH1 reality TV series
- List of Scream Queens (2015 TV series) episodes, episode list for the 2015 Fox horror/black comedy series
