= John Kalangis =

Canadian filmmaker, writer, and actor

John Kalangis is a Canadian filmmaker, writer and actor, most noted for his films Jack and Jill and Love Is Work.

Jack and Jill, his directorial debut, premiered in the Perspective Canada program at the 1998 Toronto International Film Festival. Kalangis also had a leading role in the film.

His second film, Love Is Work, was made through a process of improvisation, in which the actors were given broad story outlines but had to improvise their dialogue. It was shot at the Rhino, a restaurant in the Parkdale neighbourhood of Toronto. It was not originally intended as a film, but merely as a workshopping process toward the development of a screenplay; however, after struggling with the process and even undertaking a failed attempt to turn each scene into five separate short films, Kalangis and Roland Schlimme edited the original footage together into a feature film. The film was the winner of the Audience Award at the 2005 Whistler Film Festival.

In 2007, Kalangis released his third feature film, The Mad.
