= Saw VI =

2009 film by Kevin Greutert

- Theatrical release poster
- Directed by: Kevin Greutert
- Screenplay by: Patrick Melton; Marcus Dunstan
- Produced by: Gregg Hoffman (Note: Although Hoffman died in 2005, he had received posthumous producer credit in films produced by Twisted Pictures starting with Saw III (2006).); Oren Koules; Mark Burg
- Starring: Tobin Bell; Costas Mandylor; Betsy Russell; Mark Rolston; Peter Outerbridge; Shawnee Smith
- Cinematography: David A. Armstrong
- Edited by: Andrew Coutts
- Music by: Charlie Clouser
- Production company: Twisted Pictures
- Distributed by: Lionsgate Films
- Release date: October 23, 2009
- Running time: 90 minutes
- Country: United States
- Language: English
- Budget: $11 million
- Box office: $69.8 million

Saw VI is a 2009 American horror film directed by Kevin Greutert (in his directorial debut) and written by Patrick Melton and Marcus Dunstan. A sequel to Saw V (2008) and the sixth installment in the Saw film series, it stars Tobin Bell, Costas Mandylor, Betsy Russell, Mark Rolston, Peter Outerbridge, and Shawnee Smith.

Similar to its predecessor, Saw VI maintains the focus on the posthumous effects of the Jigsaw Killer (Bell) and the progression of his successor, Detective Lieutenant Mark Hoffman (Mandylor). The plot follows insurance executive William Easton (Outerbridge), who must complete a series of deadly "games" set up by Hoffman in order to rescue his employees and family. Meanwhile, the FBI comes to suspect that Agent Peter Strahm, who was framed by Hoffman as being Jigsaw's successor, was not actually Jigsaw's accomplice and re-opens the investigation, drawing Hoffman into motion to protect his secret identity.

Greutert, who had served as editor for the previous Saw films, made his directorial debut with Saw VI. Melton and Dunstan, who wrote the screenplays for Saw IV (2007) and Saw V, returned to write the screenplay, and Charlie Clouser, who composed all previous films, returned to compose the score. Shot on a budget of $11 million, it was filmed in Toronto from March to May 2009.

Saw VI was released on October 23, 2009, and ended up grossing over $69.8 million globally. It was the lowest-grossing film in the Saw franchise at the time, but it was still considered a financial success given its low budget. The film received mixed reviews. A sequel, Saw 3D, was released the following year in 2010.

== Plot ==
Predatory lenders Eddie and Simone are locked in head harnesses with screws aimed at their temples, and have one minute to each cut flesh from their bodies and weigh the scale in their favor to survive. Eddie, who is overweight, slices several chunks of fat from his stomach, but is killed after Simone chops off her arm and tips the scale before the timer expires. The game is observed by Mark Hoffman, who has just escaped from the trap that killed FBI agent Peter Strahm. (Note: As depicted in Saw V) He then uses Strahm's severed hand to plant his fingerprints at the scene. The police and FBI agent Dan Erickson investigate alongside FBI agent Lindsey Perez, whose survival was concealed by Erickson for her protection. During Eddie's autopsy, Dr. Heffner reveals that the blade used to cut the puzzle piece from his remains is the same blade used years earlier on Seth Baxter. Perez and Erickson reopen the investigation, and analyze the videotape found at the scene.

Hoffman arrives at Jill Tuck's clinic and demands five envelopes containing photographs of the following game's test subjects from the box left to her in John Kramer's last request. The game involves health insurance executive William Easton and his associates, whose company's dubious business policy turned down their clients' coverage for medical treatment, one of them being John Kramer. After Hoffman abducts them to an abandoned zoo, William and his janitor, Hank, are suspended in chains with large metal vises that will crush their bodies each time they breathe in their oxygen masks. The vise kills Hank, and William proceeds to his other three tests to unlock the remaining bomb shackles from his limbs. The second test at an aquarium forces William to save his middle-aged secretary Addy over his file clerk Allen, who hangs to death from a barbed-wire noose. At the boiler room, William releases his lawyer Debbie, who attacks him to retrieve a key inside his body and unlock a speargun attached to her harness. He fights her off until the device kills her. William's final test involves his six subordinates chained to a rotating roundabout where he is only able to save two of them from a mounted shotgun. The game is viewed by mother Tara with her teenage son Brent, and news journalist Pamela Jenkins from two opposite animal enclosures below the observation room.

During the game, Hoffman is called away by Erickson to the audio lab after obtaining the videotape. Erickson, now aware of Strahm's demise, confronts Hoffman after discovering the abnormalities found in Strahm's fingerprints at the time of his death. When Hoffman's voice is unscrambled from the tape, he kills Erickson, Perez, and a technician. Hoffman returns to the observation room and finds the letter he wrote to Amanda Young, who indirectly instigated Cecil Adams' robbery at Jill's clinic that resulted in her miscarriage; (Note: As depicted in Saw IV) Hoffman used this knowledge to blackmail Amanda into killing Dr. Lynn Denlon. (Note: As depicted in Saw III) The letter was found by Pamela and given to Jill, who then uses it to ambush Hoffman. Jill, who had the remaining contents from her box including a sixth envelope containing Hoffman's photo, restrains him and locks a modified reverse bear trap to his head, posthumously fulfilling John's will to test Hoffman after his death.

William reaches the end of his path and enters the cages where he reunites with Pamela, who is his sister. He is confronted by Tara and Brent, the widow and son of Harold Abbott, a former client who succumbed to his heart disease after William denied his medical request. John's videotape informs Tara to decide William's fate by using the lever in her cell connecting to tanks of hydrofluoric acid from each cage. As William and Pamela try to persuade the family, an enraged Brent pulls the lever, releasing a platform of needles that kills William by injecting acid into his body. After Jill leaves, Hoffman breaks his wrist to free himself and gets out of the trap just as it activates, ripping open his right cheek in the process.

== Cast ==
- Tobin Bell as Jigsaw / John Kramer
- Costas Mandylor as Hoffman
- Mark Rolston as Erickson
- Betsy Russell as Jill
- Shawnee Smith as Amanda
- Peter Outerbridge as William
- Athena Karkanis as Agent Perez
- Samantha Lemole as Pamela Jenkins
- Tanedra Howard as Simone
- Marty Moreau as Eddie
- Shawn Ahmed as Allen
- Janelle Hutchison as Addy
- Gerry Mendicino as Janitor
- Caroline Cave as Debbie
- George Newbern as Harold
- Shauna MacDonald as Tara
- Devon Bostick as Brent
- Darius McCrary as Dave
- Shawn Mathieson as Josh
- Melanie Scrofano as Gena
- Karen Cliche as Shelby
- James Gilbert as Aaron
- Larissa Gomes as Emily
- Billy Otis as Cecil
- James Van Patten as Dr. Heffner
- François Sagat as Male Addict
- Mpho Koaho as Timothy

== Themes ==
Contemporary reviews of Saw VI cited elements of social commentary in the film, highlighting the topicality of Jigsaw victims Eddie and Simone—two predatory mortgage brokers—in light of the subprime mortgage crisis, which was ongoing at the time of the film's release. Also noted by critics was Jigsaw's testing of William and his associates as a consequence for their unethical behavior as health insurance providers, with The Philadelphia Inquirer's James Franklin writing that, "Saw VI aims to give viewers the vicarious pleasure of seeing the American health insurance industry, personified here as a bunch of back-stabbing jerks, get what's coming to it. Most Americans, however, would probably prefer to pay lower premiums than witness their HMO manager being dissolved from the inside out by hydrofluoric acid."

== Production ==
=== Development and writing ===
In May 2008, it was reported that Kevin Greutert, the editor of the first five films in the Saw franchise, would make his directorial debut with Saw VI. Greutert found the process of transitioning from editor to director easy due to his experiences in developing short films and his knowledge about the discussions between the producers and filmmakers. Newcomer to the series, Andrew Coutts replaced him as editor for the film. Saw VI marked David A. Armstrong's last time to serve as cinematographer of the series. Mark Burg and Oren Koules again served as producers, with James Wan and Leigh Whannell, creators of the series, executive producing. Charlie Clouser was brought back to compose the score. Patrick Melton and Marcus Dunstan, writers of Saw IV and Saw V, returned to write the sixth installment. Melton said that the film had good pacing and a resolution for the series. Greutert commented that Saw VI would have some finality to it, something he always wanted to see in the series. During the early planning stage for the script it was suggested that Costas Mandylor's character, Detective Hoffman, should take on the mafia due to his vigilante modus operandi, but the idea was quickly dismissed as not "feeling Saw enough" and more like "The Punisher". Greutert said in a Demon FM interview that Lionsgate told him a week before filming, that Saw VI would be post-converted into 3D. Greutert was upset by this, since the film he envisioned was a 2D film, aesthetically. The plans were later abandoned due to time restraints.

=== Casting ===
In July 2007, before Saw IV was released, Costas Mandylor signed-on to appear as Mark Hoffman in Saw V and Saw VI. Mandylor commented on his character, "Hoffman is sort of torn of becoming a mad man or becoming a guy that's more composed, coming from a pure place like Jigsaw. That's my character's dilemma; does he go fucking crazy or follow the rules of the boss?". Scott Patterson, who played Special Agent Peter Strahm in Saw IV and Saw V, originally signed on to appear in Saw VI as well, though Patterson noted that signing on the film didn't necessarily meant he would appear on it or that his character couldn't be killed off. A television reality show titled, Scream Queens, aired in 2008 on VH1, in which ten unknown actresses competed for a role in Saw VI. Tanedra Howard won the competition, giving her a role in the film playing Simone; a role she would reprise in the sequel Saw 3D.

Greutert stated that Saw VI would have the most characters of any Saw film to date but reassured the writers would stay true to previous storylines to prevent any "violations of logic and chronology". In March 2009, it was confirmed by news reports that Shawnee Smith would return as Amanda. Newly filmed "flashback" scenes would be created instead of using archive footage from previous entries, as had been done in the films since her character's death in Saw III. On April 19 it was announced that James Van Patten would return as Dr. Adam Heffner, a character featured in the opening scene of the fourth installment performing the autopsy on John Kramer. Peter Outerbridge was cast as a new character, William Easton, and Tobin Bell, Betsy Russell, and Mark Rolston returned as their characters John Kramer, Jill Tuck, and Special Agent Dan Erickson, respectively. Russell commented about her character: "You find out a little more about if Jill is good or evil. Pretty much you'll know." Devon Bostick, who previously appeared as another character in Saw IV, was cast as Brent Abbott, the son of one of William's former clients. Greutert wanted to bring Cary Elwes' Saw character Dr. Lawrence Gordon back but Elwes was unavailable. He was later cast in Saw 3D, though the storyline is different than the one Greutert had planned in Saw VI.

=== Filming and trap designs ===
Concept art of the "carousel room" trap. Since the actors were constantly spinning, they were given anti-nausea medication to prevent motion sickness.

With a budget of $11 million, Saw VI began principal photography on March 30, 2009, and wrapped in May 2009. The film was shot at Toronto's Cinespace Film Studios. Greutert felt that there was some bold visual design stemming from what have been shown in previous Saw films, choosing to reuse past aspects he liked like some of the characters, leading him to search their salient points in the storyline to include them into the plot. In his words, Greutert wanted to bring "a lot of the same insane energy Darren Bousman brought" to the series, but making the film feel not only like a horror film but also a thriller, in addition to create the feeling of the audience being in a "roller coaster, then it needs to make you feel like it's broken down, it's slow and dark and then something jumps out. The floor falls out from under you and you're back on the roller coaster." He said that the victims in traps would be more one-on-one with the trap and would be more personal to them. This was compared to Saw IV and Saw V, which most of the traps were set in big rooms and involved several people at one time. To conceive the traps, once the storyline was assembled without any specific details for the traps, the writers, Greutert, the producer and the production designer brainstormed ideas for traps in the production office, with some improvised there and others coming from the script.

Armstrong told Bloody Disgusting reviewer Mike Pereira that he thinks "visually" Saw VI might be his favorite, saying "We're kind of pulling back a little bit in the color palette. It's going to be more suggestive and not so vibrant, in your face like III and IV. It's more neutral and shows natural flesh tones. On Saw V, I pulled back a little bit and on this one, I pulled back even more." He commented that the "steam room" trap was the "best looking" of them all. He went on to say, "It's big and expensive. It's got furnaces, fires and steam. It's multi-leveled. The most complex Saw. We had techno cranes flying through. It was pretty amazing." Commenting on the "carousel room" trap Armstrong said: "It's very carnival, playground-like. It's just nasty. [There are] spinning red lights in there. It's really overwhelming to walk in and look at because everything is spinning." Greutert said in an issue of the horror magazine Fangoria that the "carousel room" was, to date, the "longest trap scene ever". He admitted that originally they had ten actors riding the carousel, but it was ultimately scaled down to six, to "tie in to the [film's] title". Post-production services were provided by Deluxe.

== Release and censorship ==
Saw VI was released on October 23, 2009. Most of the film's stars attended the Lionsgate annual "red carpet" event for the film at Grauman's Chinese Theatre in Hollywood, California. The Motion Picture Association of America only took issue with the opening scene, in which two characters have 60 seconds to escape a mechanical device on their heads with screws pointing at their temples by cutting off their flesh and tossing it into a scale. The scene was cut down slightly to receive an R rating. In Spain, the film was rated with a Película X rating for extreme violence, and restricted screenings to only eight adult theaters in that region. Buena Vista, the film's foreign distributor, appealed the decision. After producers cut several of the "most violent scenes" to obtain a "not under 18" rating, it was released in Spain on October 8, 2010. Saw VI was banned in Trinidad and Tobago and Thailand.

=== Soundtrack ===
Saw VI: Original Motion Picture Soundtrack includes music by the bands Every Time I Die, Chimaira, Suicide Silence, Nitzer Ebb, Mushroomhead, and Lacuna Coil, among others. The soundtrack includes 18 tracks separated by three parts, each with six songs and includes three bonus tracks. It was released in October 2009, through Trustkill Records.

James Christopher Monger of AllMusic praised the use of hard rock and heavy metal music, something that had been missing since Saw IV. He said in his review that "It's a fitting marriage, as hard rock and heavy metal are the sonic suitors to horror and torture porn films and video games". He particularly liked the songs by Hatebreed ("In Ashes They Shall Reap"), Converge ("Dark Horse"), My My Misfire ("The Sinatra"), and Kittie ("Cut Throat"), calling the songs the "most ferocious moments this time around".

=== Home media ===
The DVD, Blu-ray and digital download were released on January 26, 2010. The DVD and Blu-ray releases include an additional scene after the credits roll, featurettes about Jigsaw, the traps, and the first look at Universal's Halloween Horror Nights "Saw: Game Over" maze. Music videos by Memphis May Fire, Hatebreed, Mushroomhead, and Suicide Silence were included with all editions. During its initial release, all three editions came bundled with the first film.

According to the website, The Numbers, which tracks DVD and Blu-ray sales in the United States and Canada, Saw VI placed number three in its first week on the DVD sales chart, selling 220,107 units ($2.7 million) in the United States. In comparison, Saw V sold 515,095 units ($11.3 million) its first week. The film grossed $13.4 million in home sales.

== Reception ==
=== Box office ===
Saw VI opened in 3,036 theaters on 4,000 screens and earned $6.9 million on its opening day, in second place behind Paranormal Activity which grossed $7.5 million that day during its second weekend of wide release. It grossed $14.1 million its opening weekend, which is the lowest of all the Saw films. It remained at number two behind Paranormal Activity which was playing on only 64% as many screens as Saw VI, but made 67% more money.

On Halloween weekend, it moved down to number six and made $5.2 million, a 63% decrease in ticket sales from the previous weekend. By its third weekend it declined in sales by 61% and was removed from 945 theaters. It fell into 11th place with $2 million. By its fourth weekend, ticket sales declined by 78% and the film was pulled from 1,314 theaters; it made $449,512. On its fifth and final weekend it made $91,875, an 80% decrease, and it was pulled from an additional 599 theaters. It was being shown in 178 theaters by the end of its run. The film closed out of theaters on November 24, 2009, after 35 days.

Saw VI began its international run in tenth place with $4.7 million on 946 screens in 11 markets. It opened in the United Kingdom in second place behind Up, grossing $2.6 million on 375 screens. In Australia, it opened at fourth place with earnings of $846,000 on 164 screens. In its second week it came in eighth place with $4.4 million on 1,229 screens in 20 markets for a total of $11.8 million. The film opened in third place in Russia with $1.1 million on 273 screens while it fell to fourth place in the United Kingdom with $1.5 million on 381 screens over the weekend for a total of $6.1 million. Saw VI was released in Spain on October 8, 2010, and grossed $1.2 million on its opening weekend in 211 theaters. Saw VI came to gross $27.6 million in the United States and Canada, and $40.5 million in other markets, for a worldwide total of $68.2 million; making it the second lowest-grossing film of the series.

=== Critical response ===
Saw VI was not screened in advance for critics. On the review aggregator website Rotten Tomatoes, 39% of 74 critics' reviews are positive, with an average rating of 4.6/10. The website's consensus reads: "It won't earn the franchise many new fans, but Saw VI is a surprising step up for what has become an intricately grisly annual tradition." Metacritic, which uses a weighted average, assigned the film a score of 30 out of 100, based on 12 critics, indicating "generally unfavorable" reviews. Audiences polled by CinemaScore reported that the average grade moviegoers gave the film was a "B" on an A+ to F scale.

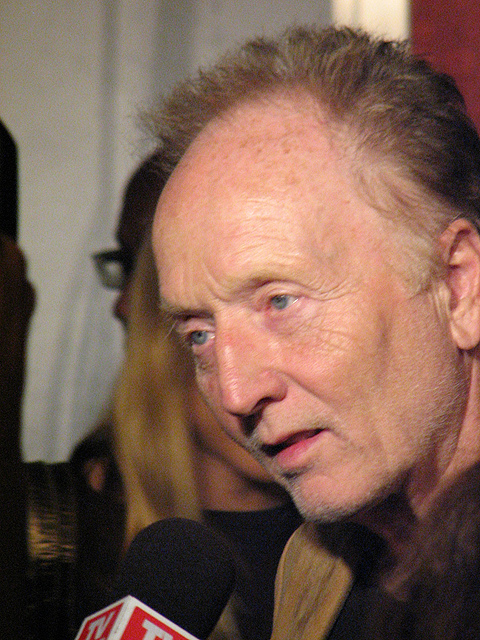
Although Tobin Bell's character was killed in Saw III, his Jigsaw persona sustains a crucial part in every sequel.

Owen Gleiberman, writing for Entertainment Weekly, said that "Saw VI is the thinnest, draggiest, and most tediously preachy of the Saw films. It's the first one that's more or less consumed by backstory—which is to say, it's one of those hollow franchise placeholders in which far too many fragments from the previous sequels keep popping up in flashbacks." He said, "If your goal is to do a quick study for a round of Saw Trivial Pursuit, then this may be the movie for you. If you're looking to be jolted into fear or queasy laughter, skip this sequel and hope that the producers get their sick act together next time." Rob Nelson of Variety wrote, "Squeezing another pint of blood from its torture porn corpus, Lionsgate slays again with Saw VI, a film so frighteningly familiar it could well be called 'Saw It Already'. At least the requisite moralism is more playful than pious in this edition", but added, "Presumably owing to director Kevin Greutert's work as editor of all five previous Saw pics, the film's juggling of chronology is the franchise's best...." IGN's Christopher Monfette rated Saw VI three out of five and wrote, "while Saw VI certainly offers a redemption for the series and the promise of a coming power struggle for Jigsaw's legacy, Saw VII will no doubt mark the time to either shake things up or watch this franchise get the ax".

Frank Scheck of The Hollywood Reporter' said, "If this is torture porn, it's as if it was designed to be enjoyed by Michael Moore." He closed his review saying, "As usual, what gives the film whatever interest it has -- beyond satisfying the rapacious appetites of gore aficionados -- is the moral element attached to the various Rube Goldberg-style set pieces. Here, it's exemplified by a well-staged sequence in which a man must choose who lives or dies during a particularly lethal variation of musical chairs." Roger Moore writing for Orlando Sentinel gave the film two out of five stars. He said the script "has a more lyrical bent, and a more satiric bite, than any of the other Saw sequels" and called the acting "perfunctory on most fronts". The Los Angeles Times's Robert Abele gave the film a negative review, writing "But, really, do reformers and victims of callous health insurers really want a guy with a penchant for elaborately constructed death panels of his own to be their advocate? Elsewhere, the usual critiques apply: terrible acting, zero suspense, laughable logic and the promise of another one next year. How can we get this policy canceled?" Chris Hewitt of the St. Paul Pioneer Press gave the film a negative review. He was displeased that the film offered nothing new saying, "The first three Saw movies had some intriguing ideas and an unusual way of presenting them, but the three most recent films have barely bothered to come up with anything fresh." Kim Newman of Empire gave the film three out of five, stating "Saw VI gets back to Saw basics in gripping, gruesome manner."

Wesley Morris of The Boston Globe gave the film a two and half out of four stars saying, "Who knew that the franchise's creators would eventually find a plot twist that made sense? Who knew they'd realize that Tobin Bell's righteous killer had current-events value? Given our cable-news climate, it's not beyond imagining that John Kramer could have his own populist TV show: 'Jigsaw's Death Panel'?". Brad Miska of Bloody Disgusting gave the film seven out of ten and wrote "Saw VI is faithful to the franchise and the twist/finale are 100% satisfying. Saw fans will walk out of the theater with their fists in the air with the feeling that they've reclaimed their beloved franchise." Marc Savlov of The Austin Chronicle gave the film one and half out of five stars, saying "Enshrouding the whole gooey mess in the already blood-spattered surgical garb of the ongoing health care debate is a crafty move on the screenwriters' part, but once you get past that pseudo-ironic touch, this Saw is no more or less disturbing than any other in the series".
