= The Mad =

- Directed by: John Kalangis
- Written by: Kevin Hennelly; John Kalangis; Christopher Warre Smets
- Produced by: Harvey Glazer
- Starring: Billy Zane; Maggie Castle
- Cinematography: Brendan Steacy
- Edited by: Alex Shuper
- Music by: Brendan Bane
- Production companies: 235 Films; Peace Arch Entertainment Group
- Release date: 22 May 2007
- Running time: 83 minutes
- Country: Canada
- Language: English

The Mad is a 2007 comedy/horror film, starring Billy Zane and Maggie Castle, and directed and written by John Kalangis.

== Plot ==
A doctor and his teenage daughter are terrorized by flesh-eating zombies at a truck stop.

== Cast ==
- Billy Zane
- James Binkley
- Maggie Castle
- Matthew Deslippe
- Evan Charles Flock
- Jordan Madley
- Rothaford Gray
- Christopher Gross
- Shauna MacDonald
