= Gabby West =

American actress (born 1985)

- Born: Gabrielle D. West; Los Angeles, California, U.S.
- Occupation: Actress
- Years active: 2006-present

Gabrielle D. "Gabby" West is an American actress. She won a role in Saw 3D in a competition on the reality show Scream Queens.

== Life and career ==
West was born in Los Angeles, California; she graduated from Century High School in Bismarck, North Dakota in 2003. She attended one semester at North Dakota State University, majoring in English Literature, and a year at a university in Bozeman, Montana. In 2005 she was a production assistant on the TV mini-series Into The West. In 2006, she played Suzy in the short film New Beginnings. In 2007, she moved to Los Angeles, California to pursue an acting career. That same year she also appeared in the short film Linda, as in Beautiful and was a production assistant for the film 3:10 to Yuma.

In 2008, she guest starred on Tim and Eric Nite Live while being a production assistant for both the TV mini-series Comanche Moon and the film Appaloosa. In 2009, she appeared in Brüno as a German and then was cast out of 36,000 applicants on VH1's reality series Scream Queens and later won a role in the 2010 horror film Saw 3D. West was originally cast in the 2011 remake of Fright Night but she dropped the role, telling DreadCentral, "I was cast in Fright Night (the remake), but unfortunately the role changed, and what they wanted me to do, I wasn't willing to do". West was cast in the Tim Sullivan segment of I was a Teenage Werebear, part of the anthology series Chillerama scheduled to be released 2011. She plays Peggy Lou a "60′s era, Sandra Dee character who goes crazy".

== Filmography ==
=== Film ===
Year	Title	Role	Notes
2006	New Beginnings	Suzy	Short film
2007	Linda, as in Beautiful	Friend in Store	Short film
2009	Brüno	German	Uncredited
2010	Saw 3D	Kara	
2011	Chillerama	Peggy Lou	Segment: "I Was A Teenage Werebear"
2012	The Last Ghost Dancer	Maya	Short film
2014	Last Night	Kristin	Short film
2016	Friends Forever	Nora	Short film

=== Television ===
Year	Title	Role	Notes
2008	Tim and Eric Nite Live	Blonde	Episode: #1.9
2010	The Odds	Tanesha	Unaired television pilot
2010	Scream Queens	Herself	Contestant (Winner)
2018	Order Fire Pick Up	Eden	Episode: "Girl Cook"
2018	Superstore	Cheyenne’s Friend	Episode: "Back to School"; uncredited
2023	Platonic	Neighbor Mom	Episode: "When Will Met Sylvia"
