= Date Night =

2010 film by Shawn Levy

- Theatrical release poster
- Directed by: Shawn Levy
- Written by: Josh Klausner
- Produced by: Shawn Levy
- Starring: Steve Carell; Tina Fey; Taraji P. Henson; Common; Mark Wahlberg
- Cinematography: Dean Semler
- Edited by: Dean Zimmerman
- Music by: Christophe Beck
- Production companies: 20th Century Fox; 21 Laps Entertainment; Dune Entertainment
- Distributed by: 20th Century Fox
- Release dates: April 6, 2010 (New York City); April 9, 2010 (United States)
- Running time: 88 minutes
- Country: United States
- Language: English
- Budget: $55 million
- Box office: $152.3 million

Date Night is a 2010 American romantic action comedy film directed by Shawn Levy and written by Josh Klausner. The film stars Steve Carell and Tina Fey, alongside Taraji P. Henson, Common, and Mark Wahlberg in supporting roles. The plot involves a comedy of mistaken identity in New York City, where a bored married couple's attempt to rekindle their romance on a glamorous night out spirals into an unexpected, dangerous adventure.

Date Night premiered in New York City on April 6, 2010, and was released theatrically on April 9, 2010, by 20th Century Fox. The film received mixed-to-positive reviews from critics, with praise for the chemistry and performances of Carell and Fey, but some criticism for its plot. It performed well at the box-office, grossing $152.3 million worldwide against a production budget of $55 million.

== Plot ==
Phil and Claire Foster are a married couple from New Jersey with two children. Over time, their domestic life has become predictable and routine, leaving their relationship feeling stagnant. Phil, a tax lawyer, and Claire, a realtor, lead busy lives, and even their weekly date nights have become monotonous. The couple is spurred to reignite their romance after discovering that their close friends, Brad and Haley, are divorcing to escape the monotony of married life in search of more excitement.

In an effort to break from their routine, Phil suggests taking Claire to a trendy Manhattan restaurant. However, when they arrive, they are unable to get a reservation. Impulsively, Phil takes a reservation under the name of a no-show couple, the "Tripplehorns", despite Claire's reservations. Their night takes a sudden turn when they are approached by two men, Collins and Armstrong, who mistake them for the real Tripplehorns and demand a flash drive that they believe the Fosters have stolen from mob boss Joe Miletto. Phil and Claire try to explain the misunderstanding, but the men, armed and threatening, don’t believe them. Under pressure, Phil falsely claims the flash drive is hidden in a boathouse in Central Park.

At the boathouse, Claire distracts Collins and Armstrong while Phil strikes them with a paddle, and the couple escapes by boat. Desperate for help, they go to a police station, but they soon discover that Collins and Armstrong are corrupt NYPD detectives on Miletto’s payroll. Realizing they can't trust the police, Phil and Claire resolve to find the real Tripplehorns themselves. They return to the restaurant and find the phone number of the actual Tripplehorns.

Claire remembers a former client, Holbrooke Grant, a high-tech security expert and action hero. At his apartment, Grant traces the Tripplehorns' phone to an apartment owned by a man named Thomas Felton. Collins and Armstrong arrive, but Phil and Claire escape in Grant’s Audi R8.

They locate Felton, who goes by "Taste," along with his wife, "Whippit". The couple confesses they are "The Tripplehorns," having selected that name from Taste's admiration of actress, Jeanne Tripplehorn, and had abandoned their restaurant reservation after spotting Collins and Armstrong . Felton hands over the flash drive, which contains provocative photos of District Attorney Frank Crenshaw with prostitutes, meant to blackmail him. With the flash drive in hand, Phil and Claire are pursued by Collins and Armstrong, leading to a wild car chase involving a Ford Crown Victoria taxicab attached to their Audi at the bumpers. After several close calls, they crash into a river, escaping with their lives but losing the flash drive.

On the subway, Phil deduces that Felton was using the flash drive to blackmail Crenshaw. They return to Grant's apartment, and though initially hesitant, Grant agrees to help them. Phil and Claire head to an illegal strip club that Crenshaw frequents. Claire poses as a new dancer while Phil pretends to be her pimp. After a tense encounter with Crenshaw, they confront him about the flash drive.

Just as Collins, Armstrong, and Miletto arrive, a confrontation ensues. Phil cleverly manipulates the situation by mentioning the compromising photos, creating a mexican standoff between Crenshaw and Miletto. As tensions rise, Claire begins counting to three, a technique she uses to calm their children. At "three," a helicopter arrives, and Detective Arroyo, along with a SWAT team, swoops in to arrest Miletto, Crenshaw, Collins, and Armstrong. Arroyo reveals that Grant had tipped her off and that Phil had been wearing a wire.

The Fosters are hailed as heroes. They share a quiet breakfast at a diner, where Phil expresses his love for Claire, stating that if he had the chance, he would marry her and have their children all over again. The film ends with the couple rekindling their passion, kissing in their front yard, and lying down to watch the sky together.

== Cast ==
- Steve Carell as Phil Foster
- Tina Fey as Claire Foster
- Taraji P. Henson as Detective Arroyo
- Mark Wahlberg as Holbrooke Grant
- Ray Liotta as Joe Miletto (uncredited)
- William Fichtner as District Attorney Frank Crenshaw
- Jimmi Simpson as Detective Armstrong
- Common as Detective Collins
- Leighton Meester as Katy
- Jonathan Morgan Heit as Oliver Foster
- Savannah Paige Rae as Charlotte Foster
- Kristen Wiig as Haley Sullivan
- Mark Ruffalo as Brad Sullivan
- James Franco as Tom "Taste" Felton/Tripplehorn
- Mila Kunis as "Whippit" Felton/Tripplehorn
- Bill Burr as Detective Walsh
- Olivia Munn as Claw hostess
- Gal Gadot as Netanya
- J. B. Smoove as Cabbie
- Nick Kroll as Claw maître d'
- Jon Bernthal and Ari Graynor as young couple
- Michelle Galdenzi as Claw hottie
- will.i.am as himself

== Production ==
Filming began in mid-April 2009. Director Shawn Levy said the film was developed through close collaboration with screenwriter Josh Klausner, in conjunction with Steve Carell and Tina Fey. Although the film was designed to feel spontaneous, Levy estimated that only fifteen to twenty per cent was actually improvised.

== Soundtrack ==
Confirmed songs for the soundtrack are listed below:

- "Blitzkrieg Bop" by The Ramones
- "Burn It to the Ground" by Nickelback
- "Love Gun" by Cee-Lo Green featuring Lauren Bennett
- "Heartbreak Warfare" by John Mayer
- "Cobrastyle" by Teddybears featuring Mad Cobra
- "Why Me" by Margie Balter
- "Date Night Blues" by The Rave-Ups
- "French Connection" by Solar Budd
- "I'll Never Dream" by Kaskade
- "Moving On" by Morgan Page
- "Fresh Groove" by Muddy Funksters
- "I Want'a Do Something Freaky to You" by Leon Haywood
- "Sex Slave Ship" by Flying Lotus
- "God Created Woman" by A. B. O'Neill
- "Elephant" by Spiral System
- "Production" by Lemonworks
- "Something Bigger, Something Better" by Amanda Blank
- "Stone" by Terry Lynn
- "(Your Love Keeps Lifting Me) Higher and Higher" by Jackie Wilson

== Reception ==
=== Box office ===
Date Night opened to a strong debut, grossing $27.1 million in its opening weekend according to 20th Century Fox, narrowly surpassing Warner Bros.' Clash of the Titans by $200,000. However, after a recount, Clash of the Titans retained the top spot with $26.6 million, while Date Night debuted at number two with $25.2 million, nearly $2 million less than initially reported. The film went on to gross $98.7 million in the United States and Canada, and $53.6 million in other countries, for a worldwide total of $152.3 million.

=== Critical response ===
On the review aggregator Rotten Tomatoes, Date Night holds an approval rating of 67% based on 232 reviews, with an average rating of 6.10/10. The site's critical consensus reads: "An uneasy blend of action and comedy, Date Night doesn't quite live up to the talents of its two leads, but Steve Carell and Tina Fey still manage to shine through most of the movie's flaws". On Metacritic, the film has a score of 56 out of 100, based on 37 critics, indicating "mixed or average reviews". Audiences polled by CinemaScore gave the film an average grade of "B" on an A+ to F scale.

Roger Ebert awarded the film three and a half stars, praising its leads: "If you don't start out liking the Fosters and hoping they have a really nice date night, not much else is going to work". Jim Vejvoda from IGN rated the film 3 out of 5 stars, commenting that while Date Night "suggests a lot of comedic possibilities," it falls short in fully capitalizing on them. Nevertheless, Vejvoda noted the film "still manages to be a lot of fun".

=== Awards and nominations ===
Date Night won the Teen Choice Award for Movie Comedy, while Fey took home the Teen Choice Award for Movie Actress: Comedy for her performance.

=== Home media ===
Date Night was released on DVD and Blu-ray on August 10, 2010. The DVD offers both the theatrical version (88 minutes) and the extended version (101 minutes) of the film, along with alternate scenes, two featurettes, public service announcements, and a gag reel.

== See also ==
- 2010 in film
- Cinema of the United States
- List of American films of 2010
