= Saw 3D =

2010 film by Kevin Greutert

- Theatrical release poster
- Directed by: Kevin Greutert
- Written by: Patrick Melton; Marcus Dunstan
- Produced by: Gregg Hoffman (Note: Although Hoffman died in 2005, he had received posthumous producer credit in films produced by Twisted Pictures starting with Saw III (2006).); Oren Koules; Mark Burg
- Starring: Tobin Bell; Costas Mandylor; Betsy Russell; Sean Patrick Flanery; Cary Elwes
- Cinematography: Brian Gedge
- Edited by: Andrew Coutts
- Music by: Charlie Clouser
- Production company: Twisted Pictures
- Distributed by: Lionsgate Films
- Release date: October 29, 2010
- Running time: 90 minutes
- Country: United States
- Language: English
- Budget: $17 million
- Box office: $136.2 million

Saw 3D (also released as Saw: The Final Chapter) is a 2010 American 3D horror film directed by Kevin Greutert and written by Patrick Melton and Marcus Dunstan. A sequel to Saw VI (2009) and the seventh installment in the Saw film series, it stars Tobin Bell, Costas Mandylor, Betsy Russell, Sean Patrick Flanery, and Cary Elwes.

The plot follows author Bobby Dagen (Flanery), who, after falsely claiming to be a survivor of one of the games perpetrated by the Jigsaw Killer (Bell) in order to become a local celebrity, finds himself part of a real game where he must save his wife. Meanwhile, John Kramer's ex-wife Jill Tuck (Russell) informs internal affairs that rogue detective Mark Hoffman (Mandylor) is the man responsible for the recent Jigsaw games.

Two sequels to Saw VI were originally planned, but due to the decline in box office success for the film, Saw 3D was instead made as the final installment in the series. The plot for the originally planned Saw VIII was instead included in Saw 3D. David Hackl, director of Saw V (2008), was originally set to direct Saw 3D, but two weeks before filming, Greutert, who previously directed Saw VI, took over. The film was shot in Toronto, Ontario, from February to April 2010 and was filmed in RealD 3D.

The film opened on October 29, 2010, in the United States and Canada. It received largely negative reviews, but was a box office success, grossing $136.2 million worldwide. It was followed by an eighth film, Jigsaw, in 2017.

== Plot ==
Dr. Lawrence Gordon is revealed to have survived the bathroom trap years earlier, (Note: As depicted in Saw) using a steam pipe to cauterize his ankle nub after escaping. Some time later, another game takes place in a home improvement storefront at a shopping center. Brad and Ryan are chained to opposite sides of a worktable secured to a sliding carriage with power saws while their mutual lover Dina is suspended above a third saw. The men have 60 seconds to shove the saws into their opponent to save Dina, who had manipulated both of them into fulfilling her needs by committing crimes. Realizing her betrayal, Ryan and Brad reach a truce and allow Dina to be bisected. Meanwhile, Jill Tuck witnesses Mark Hoffman's escape from his trap (Note: As depicted in Saw VI) and seeks help from internal affairs detective Matt Gibson; she offers to incriminate Hoffman in exchange for protection and immunity.

Meanwhile, Hoffman abducts a gang of white supremacists and places them in a trap at an abandoned junkyard that kills all of them. He also abducts Bobby Dagen, a self-help guru who achieved fame and fortune by fabricating a story of his own survival of a Jigsaw trap. Bobby awakens in an abandoned psychiatric hospital and is informed that he has one hour to save his wife, Joyce, who is chained to a steel platform that gradually pulls her down as she watches Bobby's progress. After escaping from a cage hanging over a floor of spikes, Bobby navigates his way through the asylum, attempting to complete his other tests and to rescue Nina, his publicist; Suzanne, his lawyer; and Cale, his best friend, all of whom knew about Bobby's lies and aided him in fabricating his story. Despite his efforts, all of them are killed in their respective traps. Bobby reunites with Joyce after pulling out two of his own teeth to obtain the combination for the lock on the door to her room. Gibson discovers the location of Bobby's game and sends a SWAT team, who are sealed in another room and killed by toxic gas.

Finding Hoffman's command center, Gibson realizes that he gained access to the police station during the games, having been brought into the morgue in a body bag with the intention of finding Jill. Before Gibson can warn the station, he and the officers accompanying him are killed by an automatic turret gun. Hoffman infiltrates the police station, killing everyone in his path.

For his final test, Bobby must re-enact the test he claimed to have survived, by driving two hooks through his pectoral muscles and hoisting himself above the ceiling to deactivate Joyce's trap, but the hooks tear through his flesh and he falls to the floor. The timer then goes off, causing a capsule resembling a brazen bull to close around Joyce and incinerate her.

After reaching Jill and executing her with the original reverse bear trap, Hoffman destroys his workshop and begins to leave town but is subdued by three pig-masked figures. The leader reveals himself to be Dr. Gordon, who became Jigsaw's apprentice after surviving his test. Fulfilling a request from John to take immediate action if Jill were to be harmed, Gordon shackles Hoffman in the same bathroom where he was tested before throwing away the hacksaw he had used to escape and sealing the door.

== Cast ==
- Tobin Bell as Jigsaw / John Kramer
- Costas Mandylor as Hoffman
- Betsy Russell as Jill
- Cary Elwes as Dr. Gordon
- Sean Patrick Flanery as Bobby
- Chad Donella as Gibson
- Gina Holden as Joyce
- Laurence Anthony as Rogers
- Dean Armstrong as Cale
- Naomi Snieckus as Nina
- Rebecca Marshall as Suzanne
- James Van Patten as Dr. Heffner
- Sebastian Pigott as Brad
- Jon Cor as Ryan
- Anne Greene as Dina
- Chester Bennington as Evan
- Dru Viergever as Dan
- Gabby West as Kara
- Benjamin Clost as Jake
- Kevin McGarry as Charlie
- Kim Schraner as Palmer
- Oluniké Adeliyi as Sidney
- Ish Morris as Alex
- Carlos Díaz as Coroner Worker
- Elizabeth Rowin as Sara
- Christine Simpson as Donna Evans
- Rachel Wilson as Mother
- Tanedra Howard as Simone
- Shauna MacDonald as Tara
- Joanna Douglas as Joan
- Janelle Hutchison as Addy
- Greg Bryk as Mallick
- Larissa Gomes as Emily
- Kevin Rushton as Trevor

== Production ==
=== Development ===
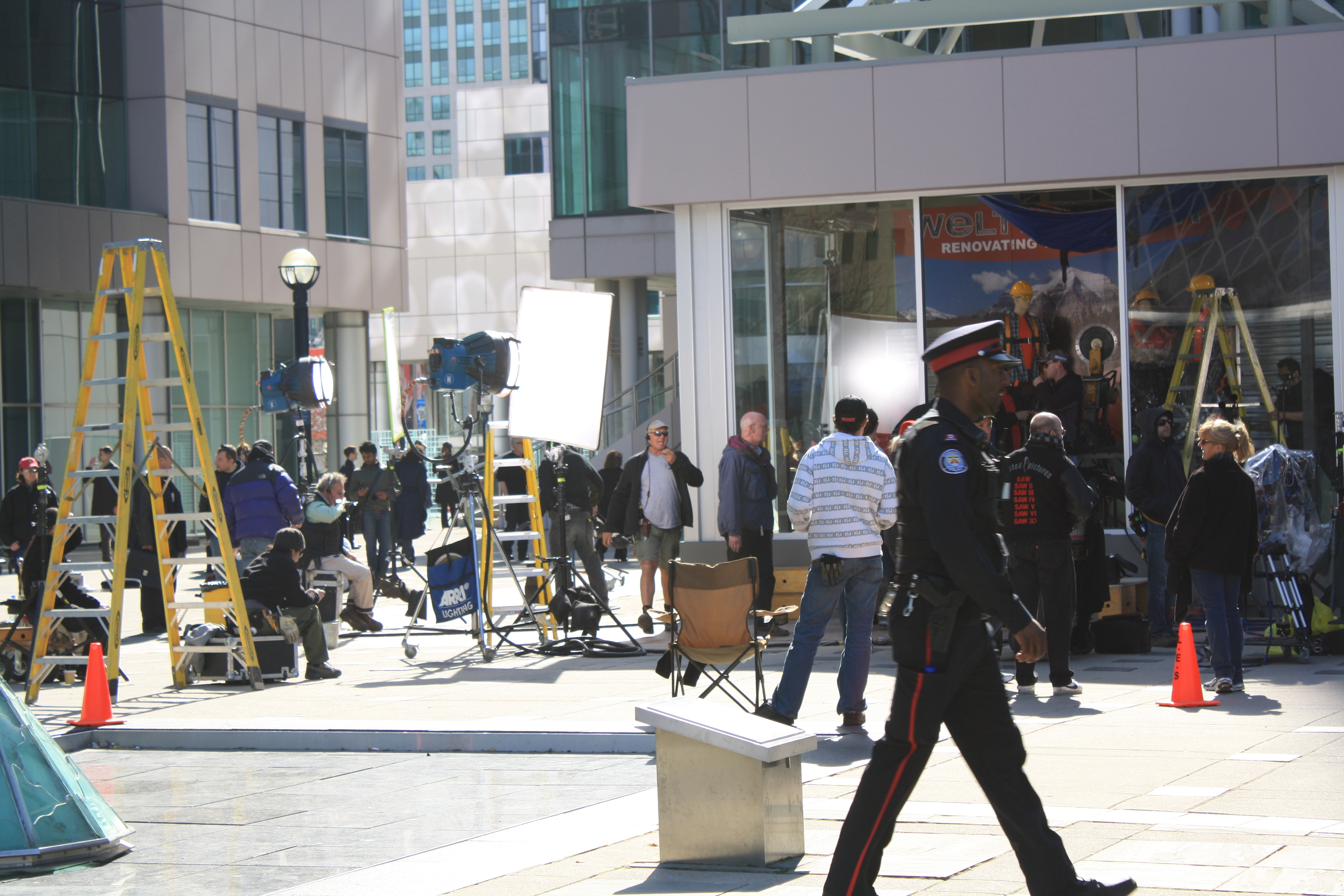
The film’s opening trap scene being constructed at the Metro Hall of Toronto in April 2010

Variety reported in July 2009 that Lionsgate greenlit Saw VII and announced David Hackl would return to direct, his last film being Saw V. Producers Mark Burg and Oren Koules, and writers Patrick Melton and Marcus Dunstan also returned. Brian Gedge replaced series' cinematographer David A. Armstrong. Pre-production began on September 14, 2009. According to Melton, there were plans to title the film Saw: Endgame. Originally two sequels were planned after the sixth, but in December 2009, Melton stated in a podcast interview with the UK radio station Demon FM that Saw VII was the final installment and would address unanswered questions from previous Saw films, such as the fate of the first film's protagonist Dr. Lawrence Gordon and other John Kramer / Jigsaw survivors from previous films, while bringing a final resolution to the series. The storyline for a Saw VIII was combined into Saw VII; this decision was primarily due to Saw VI's below average box office performance. On July 22, 2010, in an interview with USA Today the producers confirmed that Saw VII would officially end the film series. Burg told Reuters that, "In every Saw movie, we left questions open and in Saw VII we answer every question the audience has ever had". He added that, "even new viewers will be able to follow and get caught up to speed". Saw 3D was originally intended to be two separate films. According to Melton and Dunstan, "It was our original intention to make the final Saw in two parts, but when [Saw] VI didn't do so well, the studio got nervous and we were only allowed to make one more".

In January 2010, Kevin Greutert, who made his directorial debut with the sixth film, was about to begin work on Paramount's Paranormal Activity 2 when Twisted Pictures suddenly dismissed Hackl and forced Greutert on the project by exercising a "contractual clause" in his contract, much to Greutert's dismay. When Greutert arrived on set two weeks before filming began, he performed a "compressive re-write" of the script. Melton explained that, "He has a lot of ideas, but it's a bit hard and extreme to implement all of these ideas because sets have been built, people have been cast, props have been bought or created, and with the Saw films they are so specific in set design because of the traps. It becomes very problematic and difficult to change things a whole bunch right in the middle of it".

=== Casting ===
"I really have to thank the fans out there. Thank you for campaigning for me to return! They wanted to know what happened to Dr Gordon and so they wrote in a lot. Thank you for all your letters. And they blogged a lot. Thank you for your blogs. And so we thought that this being the last in the series, it was appropriate to bookend the series with answers for some of the questions about what happened to Dr Gordon.

— Cary Elwes on the reason for returning to the series.

Casting began in mid-December 2009. Cary Elwes reprised of the role of Dr. Lawrence Gordon, last seen in the first film. The filmmakers wanted to bring Elwes back earlier, but Elwes wanted to wait until the last film. His character was planned to return by Greutert in Saw VI, but Elwes was unavailable. Elwes described his character as having Stockholm syndrome. Tobin Bell returned once more to reprise his role as John Kramer / Jigsaw, even though he had originally signed on to appear in five Saw sequels as he previously stated prior to the release of Saw III. Chad Donella appeared in the film as Internal Affairs detective Gibson, who was also Detective Hoffman's former partner.

Gabby West was cast as Kara after winning the second season of Scream Queens. Tanedra Howard, the previous winner of Scream Queens, who appeared as Simone in Saw VI, reprised her role in the film. Chester Bennington, the lead vocalist of the rock band Linkin Park, has a role in the film playing Evan, a white power skinhead. Bennington met with an acting coach to prepare for his role. He said, "It was actually a little more difficult than I expected because it took a lot for me to figure out how to portray this guy and what exactly his motives were going to be throughout. I thought maybe I was overthinking it, and I met with this really great acting coach who helped me walk through and make sense of the, 'Motivation'". Devon Bostick was offered to reprise his role as Brent Abbott from Saw VI, but turned the offer down due to scheduling conflicts with Diary of a Wimpy Kid.

=== Filming in 3D ===
Saw 3D was shot entirely in RealD 3D, using the SI-3D digital camera system, rather than filming on set traditionally and later transferring the footage to 3D. Before choosing 3D, Burg and others viewed a minute of the original Saw film rendered in 3D and were pleased, which led to them choosing 3D for the seventh film. The sets and traps were designed to take advantage of 3D. To continue the fast pace of the previous films, the SI-3D cameras' light weight allowed three-quarters of film to be shot handheld. Saw 3D was Greutert's first time directing a 3D film. He said in an interview with Popular Mechanics that composing a shot in 3D was tricky compared to 2D; he explained, "If you've got both cameras looking at a subject and there's a very bright sheen on the side of the person's arm that only one camera can see, there's a good chance that when you look at a composite of the two images that sheen will not register in 3D space. It looks like a mistake. These things aren't an issue at all in 2D but in 3D are obsessively problematic". Given the cost of filming in 3D, Greutert said the budget was $17 million, the most expensive of the series up to that point. Principal photography began on February 8, 2010, in Toronto, Ontario, and wrapped on April 12, 2010. Filming took place mostly at Toronto's Cinespace Film Studios.

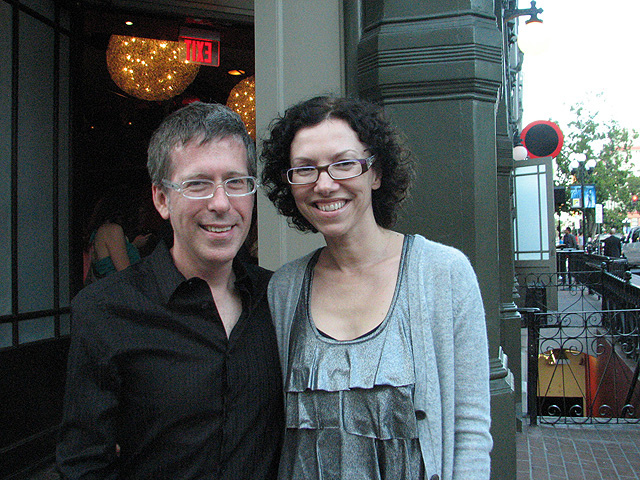
Saw 3D director Kevin Greutert and his wife, actress Elizabeth Rowin, at San Diego Comic-Con. Rowin had a small role in the film.

When determining the style of 3D shooting they wanted to use, Burg felt that the audience would want several moments where objects move into the audience, comparing this to My Bloody Valentine 3D. He acknowledged that this method would be used, but expressed an interest in shooting from the victim's perspective, similar to that of first-person shooter video games being rendered in 3D. Dunstan added that "It adds a whole new layer of discipline and criteria to creating these moments. We've had a very flat surface to try to get a reaction out of you. Now, we get to push out a bit and envelop the viewer, still maintaining the patterns that have worked and been successful, but also to raise it up a notch." Commenting on the change to filming in 3D, Bell stated it would not affect his performance or methods of acting, noting that it would be an "interesting experience". Mandylor called the 3D shoot "more tedious and longer". Flannery described (inaccurately, as the final production includes many to-viewer shock shots) the 3D aspect as being "[not] shot in 3D so that you can, per se, see blood coming directly at you. It's in 3D for the texture and the depth, for the architecture, to get a sense that you're in the scene but there's no 'we want to see blood coming at the lens' it's nothing like that. But I think we made a good movie." Post-production services were provided by Deluxe Media.

=== Traps design ===
Filming of the trap scenes, which was done last, began in March. The film's opening trap scene was filmed at Metro Hall in Toronto, Ontario, just outside Roy Thomson Hall, and included 400 extras. In the trap, the circular saw blades were actually real and functional, but safety precautions were taken for the actors. Jon Cor, one of the actors who was in the trap, told Demon FM that he had scars on his hands from the shackles, and said the other actors, Sebastian Pigott chipped his tooth and Anne Lee Greene lost the feeling in her feet and had to receive medical attention.

Producer Oren Koules told horror news website ShockTilYouDrop.com that there are eleven traps in the film, the most ever in the franchise at that point. There is one "trap" scene in the film that producers would not allow in previous Saw films that they described as "too violent", "too disgusting", and "just wrong". Melton later confirmed that was the "Garage Trap", which involved a car and sets off a "chain reaction" with other characters. Gabby West was part of the trap. She told VH1, "They molded my entire face, and basically my entire upper body after my belly button. They put layers and layers of different materials on you and you have two straws in your nose so you can breathe. It was so scary! They put so much of it on, you can't see and they put it in your ears so you can barely hear anything. That was part of the prep for the film, which was really cool, to have a dummy made of yourself. But scary." Over 25 gallons of fake blood was used in the film, which was two and half times more than Saw II.

== Release ==
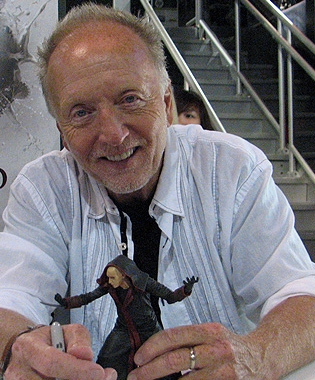
Tobin Bell promoting the film at the 2010 San Diego Comic-Con

Originally scheduled to be released on October 22, 2010, Saw 3D was pushed back a week to October 29 to prevent competition with Paramount's Paranormal Activity 2 opening. The film was distributed theatrically by Lionsgate Films in the United States and through Maple Pictures in Canada.

Saw 3D was initially rated NC-17 (No One 17 and Under Admitted) by the Motion Picture Association of America (MPAA) and had to be edited and re-submitted six times to secure an R rating. In Germany, its showing as a whole was banned from April 2012 until January 2013 because the Tiergarten District Court of Berlin noted that several scenes in the film violate the violence act §131 StGB. Private copies were still legal to own and personal use was not punishable; however any public screening was a highly prohibited and punishable act. In January 2013, the Berlin appeal court revoked the original court order after StudioCanal, who owns the distribution rights for Germany, had appealed against it.

In Massachusetts, a branch of Showcase Cinemas showed Saw 3D instead of the animated film Megamind, which was being watched by a seven-year-old celebrating a birthday. It took several minutes before the cinema employees fixed the mistake.

=== Marketing ===
On July 8, 2010, in some press materials for San Diego Comic-Con, the film was referred to as Saw 3D: The Traps Come Alive, which led to the media assuming it was the final name. The following day, Burg and Koules said that "The Traps Come Alive" was simply a tagline that had been misinterpreted as part of the title. Koules said that if they included the seventh Roman numeral followed by "3D" (Saw VII 3D), it would have been "cumbersome" and not made the impact they wanted. He explained, "It was such a process in 3D, so much hard work was put in. Saw VII 3D is too much. This is like a new movie. [...]" In the same interview, the producers addressed Saw's presence at the 2010 San Diego Comic-Con. The producers said that the footage that was going to be used for the convention could not get approved for the audience; Koules explained, "It's going to be different than what we've done before, we're going to be at Comic-Con but we're not in Comic-Con."

In the United Kingdom, a trailer shown during a broadcast of The Gadget Show led a 10-year-old viewer to register a complaint, saying it was "distressing" and "inappropriately scheduled". Clearcast had approved the trailer to be shown after 19:30 GMT, but did not actually air until 20:29. In one scene of the trailer, people in a cinema become trapped to the seats by metal restraints with a hand coming through the screen pulling a person in. The Advertising Standards Authority ruled it was "likely to cause distress to young children", and banned subsequent broadcasts from occurring before 21:00.

=== Soundtrack ===
The film's score was composed by Charlie Clouser and released on iTunes through Evolution Music Partners on November 2, 2010. The Saw 3D soundtrack is "inspired by the film" and features music from rock bands including Dir En Grey, Boom Boom Satellites, Saliva, Krokus, Hinder, Karnivool, My Darkest Days, and Chester Bennington's Dead by Sunrise. It was released through SonyMusic Independent Network (SIN) and Artists' Addiction Records on October 26, 2010. The song "Life Won't Wait" by Ozzy Osbourne is played during the film's end credits.

=== Home media ===
Lionsgate Home Entertainment released the film to home media, under the title Saw: The Final Chapter, on January 25, 2011, in three versions. The first is a standard DVD release consisting of the theatrical version of the film, a selection of bonus features and a second disc with a digital copy; a second edition is a 2D combo pack that includes an unrated Blu-ray, DVD and digital copy of the film. The last edition of the release is a 3D combo pack consisting of an unrated Blu-ray 3D, Blu-ray, DVD, and digital copy version of the film. According to the Nielsen VideoScan chart, the DVD and Blu-ray formats placed number three in its first week. The film grossed $15.1 million in home sales. An Ultra HD Blu-ray remaster, retitled Saw VII, is announced to be released on November 10, 2026 alongside Saw V (2008) and VI (2009).

== Reception ==
=== Box office ===
Saw 3D had advance screenings on October 28, 2010, in 2,000 locations and grossed $1.7 million. It opened in wide release the following day in 2,808 locations playing on 3,500 screens, the second smallest release behind the first Saw. The film earned $8.9 million on its opening day, taking the number one spot from Paranormal Activity 2. It grossed $22.5 million its opening Halloween weekend, with 92% of tickets coming from more than 2,100 3D-equipped locations and 57% of the audience being under the age of 25. It had the fifth best opening weekend in the Saw series. After only four days of wide release, Saw 3D had out-grossed Saw VI's $27.7 million final domestic gross. On its second weekend, the film dropped 66% in ticket sales and made $7.7 million, moving to the number five spot with Megamind taking its number one spot. Saw 3D closed on December 2, 2010, after 35 days of release in the United States and Canada.

Saw 3D opened in 25 territories with $14.4 million (including preview screenings) placing first place in the United Kingdom with $5.8 million, beating Saw III's $4.7 million UK opening. It opened in second place in Russia with $2.2 million; Australia and Japan grossed $909,000 and $864,800, respectively. Saw 3D grossed $12.8 million in the United Kingdom, Ireland, and Malta; $10.9 million in Germany; $7 million in Italy; $5.3 million in Russia; and $2.4 million in Australia. The film has grossed $45.7 million in the United States and Canada, with $90.4 million in other markets, for a worldwide total of $136.1 million.

=== Critical response ===
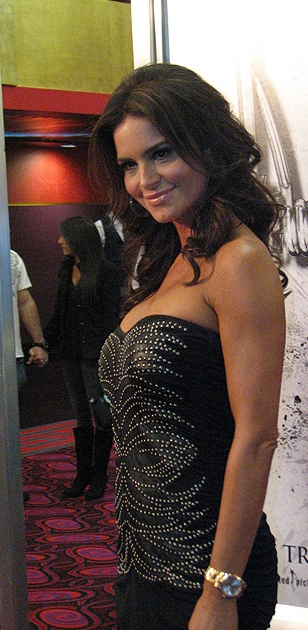
Betsy Russell attending the Saw 3D premiere at the Grauman's Chinese Theatre on October 27, 2010

On the review aggregator website Rotten Tomatoes, 9% of 80 critics' reviews are positive, with an average rating of 3.5/10. The website's consensus reads: "Sloppily filmed, poorly acted, and illogically plotted, Saw 3D leaves viewers trapped in the most lackluster installment of the series." Metacritic, which uses a weighted average, assigned the film a score of 24 out of 100, based on 17 critics, indicating "generally unfavorable" reviews. Audiences polled by CinemaScore gave the film an average grade of "B−" on an A+ to F scale.

Luke Thompson of E! Online gave the film a "B". He called the film's gore "over-the-top" and "in your face" while admitting the film had an "unusual amount of self-parody". He said the central storyline of the films was beginning to feel "played out". Rob Nelson of Variety gave the film a negative review. He called the film "relentlessly repugnant" that would please fans, but offer no surprise. He went on to say, "Apart from these limb-pulling setpieces, tech credits appear fairly shoddy, as do any 3D effects that don't include flying viscera. The editing relies on lazy flashbacks, while the dialogue remains as horrific as the killings." Kim Newman of Empire gave the film two out of five stars, calling it "a step down from last year's much more pointed Saw VI". He criticized the repetition of the plot but thought bringing back Jigsaw survivors was a "nice idea". He closed his review with, "There are a scattering of infallibly cringe-making horrors, but on the whole Saw 3D could do with more depth".

Eric Goldman of IGN gave the film two out of five stars. He was unhappy with the little screen time Bell and Elwes had been given, saying that the time the film did spend with them did not have much impact. He said the traps were a step down from Saw VI, but did point out his favorite and highlight of the film as the "garage trap". About the film's 3D effects, Goldman said "The 3D is used as you might expect it to be – which is to say, this is no James Cameron immersive experience. Instead, blades jut out of the screen, and there is some fun had with blood and guts literally shooting forward at several points". Frank Scheck of The Hollywood Reporter gave the film a mixed review. He said Saw 3D is "consistent both stylistically and thematically with previous editions", but said most of the film's traps lack the "Rube Goldberg-style cleverness that marked the series". Scheck went on to say that it was "unfortunate" the creators killed Bell's character so early in the series and called Mandylor's character (Hoffman) an "exceedingly bland stand-in". He called the visual impact of the 3D "negligible".

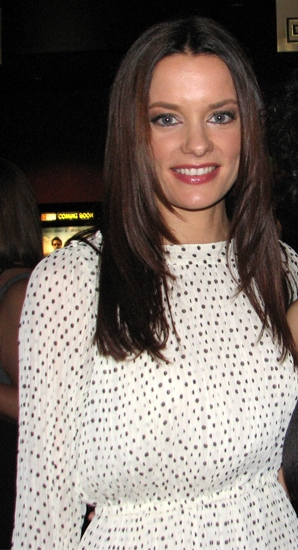
Gina Holden (Joyce) at the film's premiere

Roger Moore of the Orlando Sentinel gave the film one out of five stars saying, "It's all bunk and has been for years. These are all no-win scenarios. Whatever moral lessons were presented in the earliest Saw films seem to have been dispensed with as the movies grow more and more gruesome, with filmmakers caught up in 'What would it look like if somebody's jaw was ripped out, or their skin was glued to a car seat?' Pandering to the 'Cool, let's see that again' crowd has made Lionsgate rich but done nothing for this unendurable endurance contest of this long-enduring film franchise". Mike Hale of The New York Times called the film the most "straightforward" of the series and the "most consistently (though not inventively) violent". He ended his review saying, "If you see the film in a theater equipped with RealD 3D and Dolby sound, you'll come away with a pretty good idea of what it would feel like to have flying body parts hit you in the face".

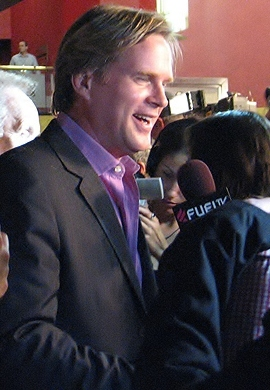
Cary Elwes reprises his role as Dr. Lawrence Gordon, last seen in the first film of the series, in newly filmed scenes as opposed to flashbacks or archive footage.

Elizabeth Weitzman of the New York Daily News gave the film one out of five stars. She criticized the lack of Bell's screentime saying, "What the filmmakers of the last four Saw movies have somehow overlooked is that Tobin Bell's Jigsaw is the linchpin of these films. It's right there in the title, so you'd think they'd realize what they lost when they killed him off in Saw III. But it's been downhill ever since, and we hit bottom today". She admitted that the performances have become "painfully stilted" and called the script "a jumble of nothing punctuated by barely-trying death traps". She went on to say, "It's also disappointing to watch a once-original franchise morph into a generic slasher series, in which random people are killed in banal ways just to up the body count" and closed her review with, "No matter how much money The Final Chapter makes over Halloween weekend, it's time to acknowledge that this game is over".

Wesley Morris of The Boston Globe called the film the "most gruesome and least coherent of the seven movies". He felt that some of the film's "games" were just randomly forced into the film, saying that kind of "episodic approach" and 3D works for a "far more innovative series like Jackass 3D". Morris closed his review by saying "This alleged final edition trashes the perverse morality of [Jigsaw's] legacy to make him the Jerry Springer of gore". Jason Anderson of the Toronto Star gave the film two out of four stars. He praised Saw 3D's plot for not being as confusing as previous films, for which he described as having to "generally require an encyclopedic knowledge of the series' many plot strands" in order to understand them. He thought Greutert gave the film a "pulpy energy" and described the film's traps and gore as having an "unpretentious sensibility" to films by Herschell Gordon Lewis.

Alan Jones of the Radio Times gave the film four out of five stars saying, "though the film initially borders on parody, once the ever-ingenious trapping begins – using fishhooks, superglue, ovens and dental equipment – the chills run on turbo drive right through to the greatest hits flashback finale". He implied that the "shock scenarios" were borrowed from sources such as, A Man Called Horse and the work of Lucio Fulci. Jones said the 3D did not add to the experience saying "the CGI blood splatter something of a distraction to the almost Shakespearean crescendo of anguish and carnage". The film was nominated for a Golden Raspberry Award for "Worst Eye-Gouging Misuse of 3D", but it lost to The Last Airbender.

== Sequel ==
While Saw 3D was intended to be the final film of the film series, in August 2012, it was reported that Lionsgate was considering rebooting the film series. By November 2013, an eighth Saw film was in active development. By February 2016, Josh Stolberg and Pete Goldfinger were hired to pen the script. Directed by The Spierig Brothers, Jigsaw was released on October 27, 2017, with Bell being the only returning cast member.

== See also ==
- List of 3D films
