= Tru Love (film) =

2013 film by Shauna MacDonald

- Film poster
- Directed by: Kate Johnston; Shauna MacDonald
- Written by: Kate Johnston; Shauna MacDonald
- Produced by: Kate Johnston; Shauna MacDonald
- Starring: Shauna MacDonald; Kate Trotter; Christine Horne; Anna Cyzon; Peter MacNeill
- Cinematography: Maya Bankovic
- Edited by: Tiffany Beaudin
- Music by: Patric Caird
- Distributed by: IndieCan Entertainment; Wolfe Releasing
- Release date: 4 October 2013 (Raindance)
- Running time: 94 minutes
- Country: Canada
- Language: English

Tru Love is a 2013 Canadian drama film written, directed, and produced by Kate Johnston and Shauna MacDonald. The film revolves around the relationships between a lesbian with commitment issues, a widowed mother and her workaholic daughter.

== Plot ==
A 37-year-old lady named Tru Richmond (Shauna MacDonald) is well known for her propensity to change beds frequently and her difficulty settling down in one place for an extended period of time. Tru seems to have a fleeting life, lacking stability and a feeling of foundation, restless, and bearing emotional scars from her past. She relies on her wit, attractiveness, and charm to get by in life. But as she gets closer to her late thirties, her way of life starts to lose its appeal, leaving her feeling weary.

Tru meets Alice Beacon (Kate Trotter), a 60-year-old widow visiting the town to see her daughter Suzanne, a 25-year-old corporate lawyer who is also a mutual acquaintance of Tru's. Unexpectedly, Tru and Alice develop a special friendship that leads to a connection. While this is happening, Suzanne, who has a troubled relationship with her mother and a complicated history with Tru, worries more and more about the growing bond between Tru and Alice.

Suzanne tries to sabotage the developing romance because she feels threatened and jealous, but her strategy backfires, leading to unintended consequences.

== Cast ==
- Shauna MacDonald as Tru Richmond
- Kate Trotter as Alice Beacon
- Christine Horne as Suzanne
- Peter MacNeill as Richard
- Tony Nappo as Taxi Driver
- Alexander Chapman as Gray
- Rachael Ancheril as Claire
- Anna Cyzon as Jaimie
- Tattiawna Jones as Angie
- Duff MacDonald as Scott
- Azra Valani as Resturent Guest
- Jerritt Boyce as James
- Sean Kaufmann as Guy at bar

== Release and reception ==
Wolfe Releasing handled global distribution for Tru Love, while IndieCan Entertainment handled it in Canada. On October 7, 2014, it was made available on VOD, and on November 4, 2014, Wolfe Video published it on DVD.

The movie received the audience award at the 2014 Inside Out Film and Video Festival, and MacDonald and Johnston shared the Emerging Artist Award. Patric Caird and Sonya Côté were nominated for Best Original Song at the 3rd Canadian Screen Awards in 2015 for "Danse Elegant."

== See also ==
- List of LGBT films directed by women
- Bound
- Daddy Issues
- Married in Canada
