= Whistler Film Festival Audience Award =

The Audience Award is an annual award given by the Whistler Film Festival to the most popular film voted by festival audiences.

== Winners ==
Year	Film	Director(s)	Ref
2002	Flower & Garnet	Keith Behrman	
2003	In the Shadow of the Chief	Ivan Hughes	
2004	Crazy Canucks	Randy Bradshaw	
2005	Love Is Work	John Kalangis	
2006	Mystic Ball	Greg Hamilton	
2007	Amal	Richie Mehta	
2008	RiP!: A Remix Manifesto	Brett Gaylor	
2009	Suck	Rob Stefaniuk	
2010	The Whistleblower	Larysa Kondracki	
2011	Monsieur Lazhar	Philippe Falardeau	
2012	My Awkward Sexual Adventure	Sean Garrity	
2013	Cas & Dylan	Jason Priestley	
2014	A Most Violent Year	J. C. Chandor	
2015	Carol	Todd Haynes	
2016	La La Land	Damien Chazelle	
2017	Darkest Hour	Joe Wright	
2018	On the Basis of Sex	Mimi Leder	
2019	A Call to Spy	Lydia Dean Pilcher	
2020	The Paper Man (Lafortune en papier)	Tanya Lapointe	
2021	Drinkwater	Stephen Campanelli	
2022	Gringa	E.J. Foerster, Marny Eng	
2023	500 Days in the Wild	Dianne Whelan	
2024	Blue Rodeo: Lost Together	Dale Heslip	
2025	Our Kind of Chaos	Ryan Stutt, Clayton Larsen	
