= In the Shadow of the Chief =

2003 Canadian documentary film

- Directed by: Ivan Hughes
- Written by: Ivan Hughes
- Produced by: Angela Heck
- Cinematography: Daniel C. Mannix
- Edited by: Ivan Hughes
- Music by: Xavier Rudd
- Production company: Fringe Filmworks
- Release date: December 5, 2003 (Whistler)
- Running time: 50 minutes
- Country: Canada
- Language: English

In the Shadow of the Chief is a Canadian documentary film, directed by Ivan Hughes and released in 2003. The film profiles the 1961 attempt of Ed Cooper and Jim Baldwin to climb the Stawamus Chief mountain near Squamish, British Columbia.

The film premiered at the 2003 Whistler Film Festival, where it was the winner of the Audience Award.
