= Luc Montpellier =

Canadian cinematographer

Luc Montpellier is a Canadian cinematographer. He is most noted for his work on the 2013 film It Was You Charlie, for which he was a Canadian Screen Award nominee for Best Cinematography at the 3rd Canadian Screen Awards in 2014.

He has also been a Canadian Society of Cinematographers award winner for Best Cinematography in a Dramatic Short in 2000 for the short film Soul Cages, and a Gemini Award winner for Best Photography in a Dramatic Program or Series at the 18th Gemini Awards in 2003 for the television film Hemingway vs. Callaghan.

He is a native of the Chelmsford neighbourhood in Sudbury, Ontario, and an alumnus of the film school at Ryerson University.

== Filmography ==
=== Film ===
- 1994 - 1994
- 1996 - Le Vidangeur
- 1998 - Jack and Jill
- 1999 - Dizzy
- 2000 - Prelude
- 2000 - Soul Cages
- 2001 - Khaled
- 2001 - I Shout Love
- 2002 - Sweetener
- 2003 - Regarding
- 2003 - Luck
- 2003 - The Saddest Music in the World
- 2004 - Aadan
- 2005 - Sabah
- 2005 - Elephant Shoes
- 2005 - Sshtoorrty
- 2005 - Love Is Work
- 2006 - Away from Her
- 2007 - Poor Boy's Game
- 2007 - Song of Slomon
- 2007 - Emotional Arithmetic
- 2008 - Night Vision
- 2008 - Norm
- 2009 - The Cry of the Owl
- 2009 - Cairo Time
- 2009 - Bouma
- 2010 - Hot Water
- 2011 - Cell 213
- 2011 - Take This Waltz
- 2011 - Happy Slapping
- 2012 - Inescapable
- 2013 - Cottage Country
- 2013 - The Right Kind of Wrong
- 2013 - It Was You Charlie
- 2014 - Happy 1 Year
- 2018 - Splinters
- 2019 - Juanita
- 2020 - Percy
- 2022 - The Last Mark
- 2022 - Women Talking
- 2024 - On Swift Horses

=== Television ===
- 2000 - Our Hero
- 2000 - Foreign Objects
- 2002 - An American in Canada
- 2003 - Hemingway vs. Callaghan
- 2003 - My Life as a Movie
- 2004 - The Shields Stories
- 2004 - Zeyda and the Hitman
- 2004 - Dark Oracle
- 2005 - Confessions of a Sociopathic Social Climber
- 2005 - Cool Money
- 2006 - At the Hotel
- 2006 - Northern Town
- 2008 - Flashpoint
- 2009 - Retail
- 2009 - Being Erica
- 2009 - Cra$h & Burn
- 2010 - Tangled
- 2011 - King
- 2013 - This Is Scarlett and Isaiah
- 2013 - Lucky 7
- 2015 - Battle Creek
- 2016 - Damien
- 2016 - The Rocky Horror Picture Show: Let's Do the Time Warp Again
- 2017 - Incorporated
- 2018 - Counterpart
- 2019 - Escaping the Madhouse: The Nellie Bly Story
- 2020 - Tales from the Loop
- 2020 - Tiny Pretty Things
- 2022 - Tell Me Lies
- 2025 - The Copenhagen Test
