= Jack and Jill (1998 film) =

- Directed by: John Kalangis
- Written by: John Kalangis
- Produced by: Simone Urdl
- Starring: John Kalangis; Shauna MacDonald; Kathryn Zenna
- Cinematography: Luc Montpellier
- Edited by: Paul Winestock
- Music by: Steve Himel
- Production companies: Jack & Jill Productions
- Release date: September 16, 1998 (TIFF)
- Running time: 84 minutes
- Country: Canada
- Language: English
- Budget: C$300,000

Jack and Jill is a 1998 Canadian anti-romantic comedy film, directed by John Kalangis. The film stars Kalangis and Shauna MacDonald as Jack and Jill, a couple in Toronto who decide to remain together in an open relationship after Jack calls off their engagement, and Kathryn Zenna as Veronica, the waitress at their local coffee shop who ends up as a sounding board for both Jack and Jill's feelings about their relationship.

The film premiered at the 1998 Toronto International Film Festival, before going into general commercial release in 1999.

Zenna received a Genie Award nomination for Best Supporting Actress at the 20th Genie Awards.
