= Mystic Ball =

2006 Canadian documentary film

- Directed by: Greg Hamilton
- Produced by: Greg Hamilton; Matthew London
- Narrated by: Greg Hamilton
- Cinematography: Jeremy Pollard; Alex Morrison; Matthew London; Aung Ko Latt; Wolfgang Held; Dyanna Taylor; Emiko Omori; John Marsonet
- Edited by: Mary Manhardt
- Music by: Ismet Ruchimat
- Production company: Black Rice Productions
- Release date: May 1, 2006 (Hot Docs)
- Running time: 83 minutes
- Country: Canada
- Languages: English; Burmese

Mystic Ball is a Canadian documentary film, directed by Greg Hamilton and released in 2006. The film profiles the Burmese sport of chinlone.

The film premiered on May 1, 2006, at the Hot Docs Canadian International Documentary Festival, where it received a Special Jury Prize from the Best Canadian Feature Documentary jury. It was later screened at the 2006 Vancouver International Film Festival, where it won the award for Most Popular Canadian Film, and at the 2006 Whistler Film Festival, where it won the Audience Award.
