= It Was You Charlie =

- Film poster
- Directed by: Emmanuel Shirinian
- Written by: Emmanuel Shirinian
- Produced by: David Miller; Darren Portelli
- Starring: Michael D. Cohen; Emma Fleury; Aaron Abrams
- Cinematography: Luc Montpellier
- Edited by: Aren Hansen
- Music by: Ryan Latham
- Production companies: Alone Together Productions; Spiral Entertainment; A71 Productions
- Distributed by: 108 Media; A71 Entertainment
- Release date: 6 October 2013 (BIFF)
- Running time: 77 minutes
- Country: Canada
- Language: English

It Was You Charlie is a 2013 Canadian comedy-drama film. It is the first feature film of director Emmanuel Shirinian who wrote its screenplay. The movie tells the story of a lonely graveyard shift doorman named Abner, a once-accomplished sculptor and former college art teacher, but now sadly, a mere shadow of his former self. He is heartbroken because of an unresolved conflict with his brother over a woman he once loved, and is at the same time consumed with guilt and suicidal thoughts as he remains profoundly haunted a year after a terrible car accident that took the life of the young woman in the other vehicle.

== Plot ==
It Was You Charlie (the title refers to On the Waterfront) explores the lonely life of Abner (Michael D. Cohen) a short, schluby, suicidally-depressed former teacher-artist turned graveyard shift doorman and the fierce sibling rivalry he endures (if not imagines) with Tom (Aaron Abrams), his tall, handsome, lady-killing brother. Abner also harbours a tragic secret that has debilitated his professional and personal life while Tom not only seems to have everything going for him, but also scores with'Madeleine (Anna Hopkins), the babe our haplessly loveable schlemiel has long held a torch for. Zoe, a mysterious young blonde cab driver in a bright yellow beret, appears in Abner's life, but for reasons he cannot understand. Nor does he understand the repeated appearance of strange men in trench coats who seem to follow him wherever he goes. There is also something about a painting in his local diner that mesmerizes him. Estranged from his family and even further estranged from a normal life, Abner must make sense of the things around him and come to terms with what has haunted him these years. After meeting Zoe, something magical happens to Abner as he begins a quest to seek redemption, and reconcile his conflicted past.

== Cast ==
- Michael D. Cohen as Abner
- Emma Fleury as Zoe
- Aaron Abrams as Tom
- Anna Hopkins as Madeleine
- Alon Nashman as Travis
- Phyllis Ellis as Ethel
- Mike Wilmot as Detective Powell
- Theresa Tova as Sandra
- Tony Rosato as Gus
- Henry Allesandroni as Manager
- Gillian Bennett as Make Out Woman
- Russell Bennett as Make Out Man
- Curtis Hibbert as Cop #1
- Alain Chanoine as Cop #2
- Wayne Carnew as Mystery Man
- Krysta Lee as Waitress
- Aaron Hale as Young Kid
- Jimi Shlag as Evening Doorman

== Release ==
It Was You Charlie was filmed in Toronto and premiered at the Busan International Film Festival on 6 October 2013.

The order is followed by Release date

- South Korea, Busan International Film Festival on 6 October 2013
- Canada, Victoria Independent Film and Video Festival on 8 February 2014
- USA, Cinequest Film Festival on 7 March 2014
- China, Shanghai International Film Festival on 14 June 2014
- Canada, Toronto on 15 August 2014
- USA, New York City, New York on 26 September 2014

== Reception ==
The film's negative reviews were critical of how it mixed the humorous and serious content. The Toronto Star noted its "uneven blend of drama and comedy" while The Globe and Mail noted the "shifts between dark and comic never quite jive" while Now deemed the film a "mopey, sluggish study" of its protagonist. It received a neutral rating from Victoria's Times Colonist. one reviewer From Rotten Tomatoes says the movie overly eccentric and underdeveloped Another review from Way Too Inside noted the film that knows what it wants to do but struggles to pull it off, "Throughout It Was You Charlie there is a sense that Shirinian has a firm grasp of the complete film in his head, but he struggles to make a clear presentation of it on-screen. Most of the humorous moments try too hard to be funny and only manage to feel forced and fall flat."The New York Times noted the writer and director Emmanuel Shirinian’s has "taste for quirky detail" and the movie starts as an exercise in bleak absurdism and ends as a Frank Capra Christmas special, with little originality in between. The Arts Guild has positive review about this film, it noted the film has"The balanced cinematography, well-selected music, and simple direction allow us to dig into the film, truly experience every moment."The Village Voice noted that director Shirinian has made a swift, moody film, with impeccable art design. Abner is a miserable creature and yet, under Shirinian’s sure hand, we end up caring very deeply about his strange, surreal plight and want nothing more than to see him climb out of his self-made quagmire.Toronto Metro Entertainment

== Awards ==
- ACTRA Toronto Awards Nominee for Outstanding Performance by a Male Actor - Michael D. Cohen
- Canadian Screen Awards Nominee for Achievement in Cinematography - Luc Montpellier
