= Kathryn Zenna =

- Born: February 25, 1971 (age 54); Montreal, Quebec, Canada
- Occupation(s): film and television actress
- Known for: Jack and Jill, Train 48

Kathryn Zenna (born February 25, 1971, in Montreal, Quebec), sometimes credited as Kate Zenna, is a Canadian film and television actress. She is best known for her roles as Veronica in the film Jack and Jill, for which she garnered a Genie Award nomination for Best Supporting Actress at the 20th Genie Awards, and as Mel in Train 48.

== Career ==
Zenna appeared in the films Love Is Work and Ramona and Beezus, and as a guest actor in the television series Earth: Final Conflict, Twice in a Lifetime, Nikita, A Nero Wolfe Mystery, Puppets Who Kill, The Eleventh Hour, Queer as Folk, Show Me Yours, G-Spot, Psych, Brothers and Sisters and The Fosters.

== Filmography ==
=== Film ===
Year	Title	Role	Notes
1998	Jack and Jill	Veronica	
2001	Getting In	Mistress in motel	
2002	Chicago	Woman Shooter	
2003	Soldier's Girl	Female Guard	
2005	Love Is Work	Samantha	
2010	Ramona and Beezus	Mrs. Kushner	
2018	Untogether	Dr. Cassie	
TBA	BitterSweet	Chrystal	

=== Television ===
Year	Title	Role	Notes
1999	Sealed with a Kiss	Deanna	Television film
1999, 2000	Twice in a Lifetime	Kirsten / Annie	2 episodes
2000	Earth: Final Conflict	Erica Pierce	Episode: "Through Your Eyes"
2001	Tracker	Trainer #1	Episode: "The Beast"
2001–2002	Nero Wolfe	Various roles	6 episodes
2002	Master Spy	Elizabeth	Television film
2002–2003	Street Time	Pia	9 episodes
2003	Ice Bound	Annie	Television film
2003–2004	Train 48	Mel	16 episodes
2004	Wild Card	Lindsay Goldberg	Episode: "Block Parties"
2004	Puppets Who Kill	Yvonne	Episode: "Prostitutes for Jesus"
2004	The Eleventh Hour	Dr. Kathleen Bromley	Episode: "Nadir"
2004	Show Me Yours	Martha	Episode: "If You Can't Take the Heat"
2005	G-Spot	Stripper Teacher	Episode: "J Hook Up"
2005	Queer as Folk	Corrine	3 episodes
2007	Psych	Attractive Woman	Episode: "He Loves Me, He Loves Me Not, He Loves Me, Oops He's Dead"
2007	Brothers & Sisters	Cousin Catherine	Episode: "Matriarchy"
2008	Sex and Lies in Sin City	Brenda Rupp	Television film
2009	Eleventh Hour	Jennifer Hammer	Episode: "Pinocchio"
2010	I'm in the Band	Devon	2 episodes
2013	Port Hope	Amanda Clarke	Television film
2014	Extant	Female Board Member	2 episodes
2015	The Fosters	Robin	3 episodes
2020	Hollywood	Bennie O'Halloran	Episode: "A Hollywood Ending"
