= Scream Queens (2008 TV series) =

American television series

- Genre: Reality competition
- Created by: Jim Ackerman
- Presented by: Shawnee Smith (2008); Jaime King (2010)
- Judges: James Gunn (2008); John Homa; Tim Sullivan (2010)
- Country of origin: United States
- Original language: English
- No. of seasons: 2
- No. of episodes: 16 (list of episodes)

Production
- Executive producers: Joke Fincioen; Biagio Messina; Dave Hamilton; Jim Ackerman; Jeff Olde
- Producer: Peter Spoerri
- Cinematography: Adam Sampson
- Running time: 44 minutes (with commercials)
- Production companies: Lionsgate Television; Joke Productions

Original release
- Network: VH1
- Release: October 20, 2008 – September 27, 2010

Scream Queens is an American reality series on VH1 produced by Joke Productions and Lionsgate Television that premiered in October 2008. The show chronicles a group of unknown actresses competing for a role in the Saw film series. Tanedra Howard won the first season and gained a role in Saw VI. The second season began airing on August 2, 2010, and the winner, Gabby West, won a role in Saw 3D.

== Season 1 ==
The show was announced in June 2008 and debuted on October 20, 2008. In the first season James Gunn directed contestants during acting challenges, Shawnee Smith acted as a mentor, while John Homa provided instruction — and all three also acted as judges. Season 1 ended on December 8, 2008, and Tanedra Howard was crowned Scream Queen and won the "breakout role" in Saw VI.

=== Contestants ===
Name	Eliminated	Hometown
Tanedra Howard	Winner (Week 8 Final)	Inglewood, California
Michelle Galdenzi	Second Place (Week 8 Final)	Spring, Texas
Lindsay Felton	Third Place (Week 8 Final)	Seattle, Washington
Angela Anderson	Eliminated (Week 7 Semi-Final)	San Diego, California
Jessica Palette	Eliminated (Week 6)	Bolton, Massachusetts
Sarah Agor	Eliminated (Week 5)	Marlboro, New Jersey
Lina So	Eliminated (Week 4)	Las Vegas, Nevada
Marissa Skell	Eliminated (Week 3)	Islip, New York
Kylah Kim	Eliminated (Week 2)	Dallas, Texas
Jo-Anne Krupa	Eliminated (Week 1)	Hertfordshire, England

=== Contestant Progress ===
Contestant	Episode							
Contestant	1	2	3	4	5	6	7	8
Tanedra Howard	WIN	SAFE	WIN	SAFE	WIN	SAFE	BTM	WINNER
Michelle Galdenzi	HIGH	SAFE	BTM	WIN	HIGH	WIN	HIGH	RUNNER-UP
Lindsay Felton	SAFE	WIN	SAFE	WIN	BTM	BTM	WIN	ELIM
Angela Anderson	SAFE	SAFE	SAFE	BTM	SAFE	HIGH	ELIM	
Jessica Palette	SAFE	WIN	SAFE	SAFE	SAFE	ELIM		
Sarah Agor	WIN	SAFE	SAFE	SAFE	ELIM			
Lina So	SAFE	HIGH	WIN	ELIM				
Marissa Skell	SAFE	BTM	ELIM					
Kylah Kim	BTM	ELIM						
Jo-Anne Krupa	ELIM							

==== Legend ====
Winner of the season
Runner-up of the season
Contestant won the Acting Challenge, however did not receive immunity, and also won the Directors Challenge
Contestant won the Directors Challenge
Contestant won the Acting Challenge and received immunity that week
Contestant received positive critiques for the Directors Challenge but did not win
Contestant received critiques but was safe
Contestant was safe and not critiqued
Contestant landed in the bottom 2 but was ultimately saved
Contestant landed in the bottom 2 and was eliminated

=== Episodes ===
Episode 1

Acting Challenge- The girls arrive at the house, and immediately upon arrival and meeting the judges, are tasked with an acting challenge- they must each convince a homicidal maniac not to kill them in any way they choose. Tanedra is granted a callback, meaning she will not be eligible for elimination this week.

Acting Class- The ladies must each eat a piece of fruit seductively, and acting coach John Homa states that none of them are currently ready for the breakout role they're competing for.

Director's Challenge- The ladies strip down and shoot an homage scene to director James Gunn's first film, Slither. Sarah is crowned the week's Leading Lady, while Jo-Anne is given the axe.

Episode 2

Acting Challenge- The girls must introduce themselves to casting director Kelly Wagner and make a good first impression in both their appearance and their interactions. Jessica wins the callback, praised for dressing in her own personal style and not being afraid to show her true self. The bottom two, Lindsay and Marissa, are taken to a salon for makeovers to boost their edge.

Acting Class- The girls are tasked with giving snap-second reactions to prompts from coach John Homa, then viewing and critiquing the images taken of their reactions on a screen. Lindsay's new makeover boosts her confidence, allowing her to get her snap reaction in one take, while Kylah struggles to show any emotion.

Director's Challenge- Each girl is given her own fake movie title to sell a promotional modeling shot for.

Scream Queen	Movie title
Sarah	Blood Skate
Lina	Tie Die
Tanedra	Prom Scream
Marissa	Mummy Maker
Kylah	Thin Skin
Michelle	Don't Go In The Water
Lindsay	Blinded By The Fright
Jessica	The Butcher's Girl
Angela	Monster Wedding

Lindsay's promotional shot outshines the rest, and she is crowned the week's Leading Lady. The judges worry that Kylah has no personality, and she is given the axe.

Episode 3

Acting Challenge- The girls are brought to a sound stage and are taught how to do their own stunt jumps. They then are challenged to shoot a scene where a killer has backed them into a window, and they must jump out to save themselves. Tanedra wins the week's callback both for her outstanding acting and her creative fall, while Jessica is unable to get over her fear of heights and make the jump.

Acting Class- The ladies are paired up to practice their stage combat skills in a choreographed fight scene between a stabber and a victim, showcasing both their acting and their ability to fight. Jessica is criticized for her ability to play the homicidal killer, but not the heroine, and Sarah and Michelle are both called out for letting the emotion get the best of them and overacting. Lina goes so far as to actually hit Tanedra, unable to hide her dislike for the other scream queen.

Director's Challenge- The scream queens film the exact scene they practiced in acting class, but instead of each other, they film with an actor playing their masked assailant. Marissa is noted for not connecting with the camera, and Michelle is told she is too "frantic". Jessica is lauded for connecting with the more "psycho" nature of the scene. Sarah breaks into tears after her scene, stating that she knows she didn't do her best. In the end, Lina's solid, sexy-yet-scared performance is deemed worthy of Leading Lady status, while Marissa is given the axe.

Episode 4

Acting Challenge- Shawnee shows the girls a scene from a black and white horror film and challenges them to act out the same scene- but the role they're playing is just a floating head. The ladies struggle to strike a balance between comedy and horror in their scenes, especially cast opposite male leads that cannot act. Michelle takes the campy comedy too far, and Lina tries her hand at musical acting. Jessica's accent choice confuses many of the girls. Lindsay's believable choices and experience at making cheesy lines believable (in her Nickelodeon TV show past) wins her the week's callback.

Acting Class- The girls practice their scream technique in front of scream coach Melissa Cross, who created the DVD The Zen of Screaming. Jessica confronts her discomfort/unease with coach John Homa.

Director's Challenge- Director James Gunn's actor brother Sean is brought in to star alongside the girls in a faux trailer. The ladies must audition for their roles and then play up the camp as much as possible. Michelle is praised for her role as the prostitute, and is crowned Leading Lady. Lina's role requires her to make out with Angela, and while she is given a chance during auditions to speak up about her discomfort with any of the roles, she stays quiet until the actual shoot, and her behavior sends her home.

Episode 5

Acting Challenge- Shawnee has each girl confront their "worst enemy" in a pool of blood and gore. Tanedra's outstanding realness does not win her a guaranteed callback, but instead a chance to pick her partner for the director's challenge. The pairs are as follows:

Partner 1	Partner 2
Tanedra	Angela
Jessica	Sarah
Michelle	Lindsay

Acting Class- Homa brings the girls to an abandoned morgue, and has each of them spend 2 minutes in a body drawer confronting death. When they exit, they must recite a nursery rhyme while convincing everyone that they have seen death. Everyone succeeds except for Sarah, whose acting is corny and clear to all of the girls.

Director's Challenge- The girls break into their decided pairs and film a scene with hundreds of thousands of cockroaches. Jessica is praised for her ability to work with the bugs, but she and Sarah are critiqued for appearing over-rehearsed. In the end, Tanedra's consistent strong performances land her the Leading Lady title, while Sarah is given the axe.

Episode 6

Acting Challenge- The girls are challenged to act as though they've been possessed by the Devil. Jessica's unconventional approach confuses the girls yet again, and Michelle wins the challenge for having the best emotional connection, believability, and variety. She wins first choice of wardrobe in the upcoming Director's Challenge.

Acting Class- Homa asks the girls to turn into something evil- each other in their most evil forms, in pairs- and act it out the best they can. The assignment takes a turn for the worse when Tanedra and Michelle end up hurling insults at one another in their interpretations.

Director's Challenge- Actor Michael Rooker shows up to star opposite the girls in a vampiric scene. Angela's choice to include a Transylvanian accent is applauded, but she does not win leading lady, which absolutely infuriates her. Lindsay and Jessica are the bottom two, but Jessica's lack of ability to really connect gets her the axe. Michelle, who was not summoned to the ballroom, is delivered the news that she won the week's Leading Lady.

Episode 7

Acting Challenge- Each girl is given a handheld camera and asked to act out her final moments alone, as in The Blair Witch Project. Lindsay and Tanedra are both lauded for their tapes, and Lindsay wins the challenge.

Acting Class- Each girl must confront a ventriloquy doll who has supposedly kidnapped her family, and she will get cut off by Homa the minute she is not believable.

Director's Challenge- The girls are tasked with playing both themselves and their evil alter egos, and both shoots will be combined into one composite scene as if the alter ego is looking back from a mirror. Lindsay's advantage from the challenge is that she gets to choose whether she goes first or last, and she decides to go last. In panel, Lindsay's excellence throughout the week lands her Leading Lady. Angela is criticized heavily for throwing a tantrum about not getting last week's Leading Lady, and in addition, her inability to fully throw herself into a scene gets her the axe.

Episode 8

Acting Challenge- The three finalists face the "Scream Queen Gauntlet", where they must use everything they have learned during the competition to show the judges that they belong in the final two. The girls must go from victim to fighter in an elaborate single-take scene, and the loser will be eliminated immediately. At the end, Lindsay overthinks the technicalities of the scene and loses the emotion, and is given the axe.

Acting Class- Instead of traditional acting class, the girls are whisked off to Lionsgate, and view a tape for them from Jigsaw. They're informed that they will be reenacting the scene from Saw 3 between Lynn Denlon and John Kramer, where Lynn begs for her freedom. Upon return to the house, each girl gets the chance to engage in a private coaching session with Homa.

Director's Challenge- The girls film their scenes, but instead of confronting a person, Jigsaw's voice is heard through a speaker, so as to not distract from each scream queen. At final judging, Tanedra is crowned the winning Scream Queen, and is given a role in Saw VI.

== Season 2 ==
On August 12, 2009, VH1 began casting for a second season of Scream Queens. In her first interview, the season 2 winner said that over 36,000 applicants tried out; filming took place in November and December 2009. Season 2 premiered on August 2, 2010, with the winner gaining a role in Saw 3D, the 2010 entry in the Saw franchise. The winner will star alongside Tanedra Howard, the season one winner who is reprising her role as Simone from Saw VI. John Homa is the only cast member who returned from season one. Jaime King replaced Shawnee Smith as mentor, and Tim Sullivan replaced James Gunn as the director. On July 8, 2010, VH1 released an official iPhone app for the show.

=== Contestants ===
Name	Eliminated	Hometown
Gabby West	Winner (Week 8 Final)	Santa Fe, New Mexico
Jessica Ortiz	Second Place (Week 8 Final)	Bronx, New York
Christine Haeberman	Third Place (Week 8 Final)	Porterville, California
Tai Davis	Eliminated (Week 7 Semi-Final)	Chicago, Illinois
Sierra Holmes	Eliminated (Week 6)	Suffern, New York
Sarah Alami	Eliminated (Week 5)	Chicago, Illinois
Allison Kyler	Eliminated (Week 4)	Hickory, North Carolina
Karlie Lewis	Eliminated (Week 3)	New York City, New York
Rosanna Pansino	Eliminated (Week 2)	Seattle, Washington
Lana Underwood	Eliminated (Week 1)	Santa Monica, California

== Featured music ==
=== Season 1 ===
In Season, the music in each episode are performed by artists signed to Wind-Up Records.

- Episode 1: "Angels on the Moon" by Thriving Ivory
- Episode 2: "Gasoline" by Seether
- Episode 3: "We Still Dance" by Tickle Me Pink
- Episode 4: "Mayday (M'aidez)" by People In Planes
- Episode 5: "Paralyzer" by Finger Eleven
- Episode 6: "Vampire" by People In Planes
- Episode 7: "Human" by Civil Twilight
- Episode 8: "Angels On The Moon" by Thriving Ivory

=== Season 2 ===
In Season 2, Roadrunner Records replaced Wind-Up Records to feature music in each episode performed by artists signed to their label.

- Episode 1: "These Are the Days" by Madam Adam
- Episode 2: "You" by Black Stone Cherry
- Episode 3: "By The Way" by Theory of a Deadman
- Episode 4: "Never Enough" by Taking Dawn
- Episode 5: "Wait For Me" by Theory of a Deadman
- Episode 8: "These Are the Days" by Madam Adam
