= Love Is Work =

2005 Canadian film

- Directed by: John Kalangis
- Written by: John Kalangis
- Produced by: Christopher Binney
- Starring: Fabrizio Filippo; Shauna MacDonald; Kathryn Zenna; Scott McCord
- Cinematography: James Griffith; Luc Montpellier
- Edited by: Roland Schlimme
- Music by: John Mark Sherlock; Richard Underhill
- Production company: 48 FPS Productions
- Distributed by: Sullivan Entertainment
- Release date: December 2005 (Whistler)
- Running time: 75 minutes
- Country: Canada
- Language: English

Love Is Work is a Canadian drama film, directed by John Kalangis and released in 2005. The film centres on five different couples with different issues in their relationships.

Victor (Fabrizio Filippo) and Celia (Shauna MacDonald) are young professionals who are still at an early stage in their relationship, but are reaching the point where it's time to decide whether they want to commit. Harley (Kyree Vibrant) and Shaun (Scott McCord) are partners in both life and music, whose relationship is tested by Harley's suspicion that Shaun is faking a neck injury to avoid an opportunity that could take their career to the next level. Terry (Kalangis) and Sarah (Joa Gamelin) are an older couple challenged by the recent death of Terry's brother, which has resulted in their nephew Josh coming to live with them. Zoe (Natalie Radford) and Kathy (Meredith Vuchnich) are friends getting together to plan Zoe's baby shower, but who have never fully processed their feelings for each other after having briefly been lovers before Zoe married a man. Charlie (Ryan McVittie) and Samantha (Kathryn Zenna) are a couple who have reached the breaking point due to Charlie's jealous belief that Samantha is having an affair.

== Production ==
The film was made through a process of improvisation, in which the actors were given broad story outlines but had to improvise their dialogue. It was shot at the Rhino, a restaurant in the Parkdale neighbourhood of Toronto. It was not originally intended as a film, but merely as a workshopping process toward the development of a screenplay; however, after struggling with the process and even undertaking a failed attempt to turn each scene into five separate short films, Kalangis and Roland Schlimme edited the original footage together into a feature film.

== Release ==
The film premiered in the Borsos Competition program at the 2005 Whistler Film Festival, where it was named the winner of the Whistler Film Festival Audience Award. At the 2006 Canadian Film Festival, the cast won the award for Best Ensemble Performance.

The film received limited commercial release in 2007.
