= Shauna MacDonald (Canadian actress) =

Canadian actress

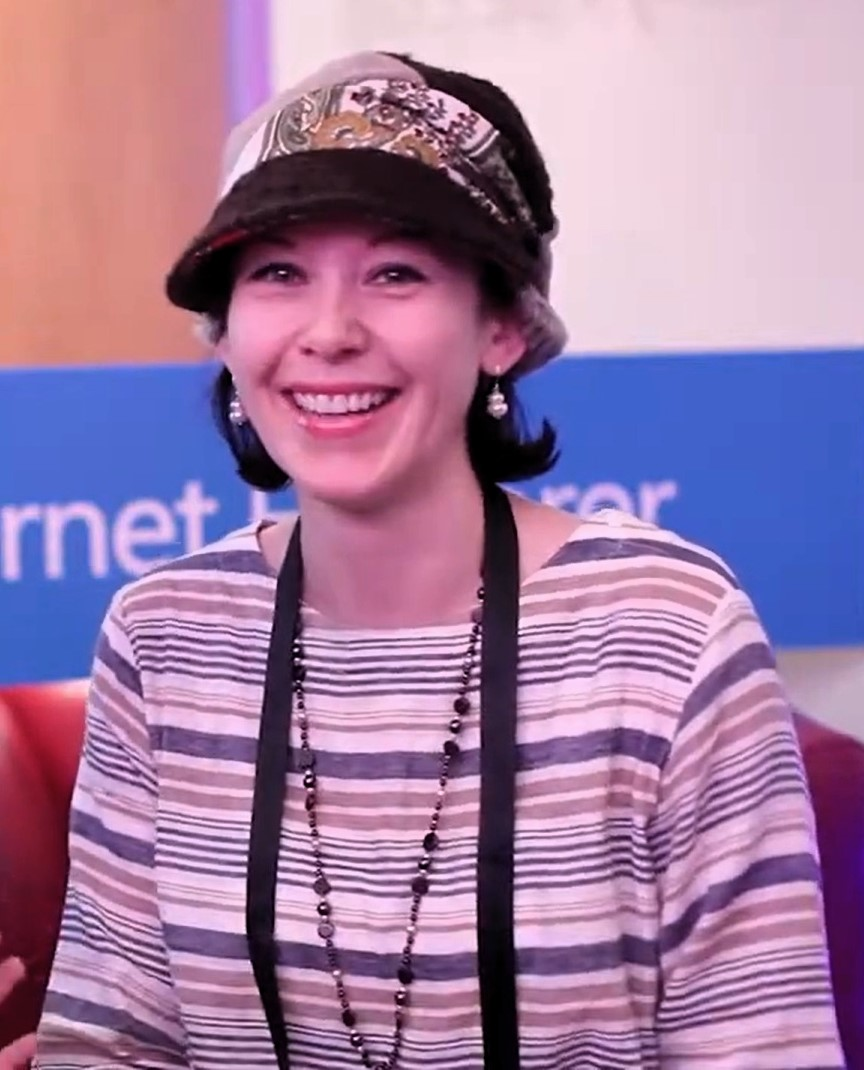
- MacDonald in 2014
- Born: Antigonish, Nova Scotia, Canada
- Occupations: Actress, director, producer, writer, voice actor, radio announcer
- Years active: 1997–present
- Notable work: Tru Love

Shauna MacDonald is a Canadian television and film actress, director, producer, writer, voice actor, and radio announcer. She became known for her role as the national continuity announcer for CBC Radio One.

== Life and career ==
MacDonald was born in Antigonish, Nova Scotia. She graduated from Dr. John Hugh Gillis Regional High School in Antigonish and later attended Montreal's McGill University, earning a degree in Russian and Slavic Studies.

She became known as the national continuity announcer for CBC Radio One, a role she held from the start of Radio One's 2004 summer season. With MacDonald's identity kept secret, the voice was quickly dubbed Promo Girl. MacDonald's identity was exposed by The Globe and Mail in 2005. The promo spots were taken over in May 2007 by Jeremy Harris.

In the summer of 2005, Radio One ran a series of weekly "comedy-mysteries" starring MacDonald, along with other Radio One personalities, titled Promo Girl in The Mystery of.... Short segments designed to highlight various CBC Radio programmes and the upcoming fall season were repeated a number of times each day, with prizes going to listeners who correctly solved the various clues or mysteries. The series was not completed due to a lockout of CBC employees that began in the late summer.

MacDonald has appeared in various Canadian series, including Trailer Park Boys (as Officer Erica Miller), These Arms of Mine (as Claire Monroe), and This Hour Has 22 Minutes (as a substitute newsreader), among other roles. In 2003 she starred in the two-part miniseries Shattered City: The Halifax Explosion. She has also appeared in an episode of Reign. MacDonald also played Tara in Saw VI, and reprised the role in Saw 3D.

She received a 2009 ACTRA Award nomination for Outstanding Performance – Female for her role as Lily in the short film Loving Loretta (2008).

In 2013, MacDonald and Kate Johnston co-wrote and co-directed the film Tru Love, in which MacDonald also starred. The film won the Best Feature Film Audience Award at the Toronto Inside / Out Film Festival in 2014.

== Filmography ==
=== Film ===
Year	Title	Role	Notes
1997	Someone to Love	Ex Girlfriend	Short film
1998	Jack and Jill	Jill	
1998	Apocalypse: Caught in the Eye of the Storm	Kerry	Video
2002	Time of the Wolf	Anna MacKenzie	
2002	Undercover Brother	Wendy Marshall	
2003	Spinning Boris	Lisa	
2004	Saint Ralph	Emma Walker	
2004	The Porcelain Pussy	Velma	Short film
2005	Love Is Work	Celia	
2007	The Mad	Monica Tepper	
2007	Breakfast with Scot	Joan	
2008	Production Office	Jane	
2008	Loving Loretta	Lily	Short film
2008	Toronto Stories	Lowry	
2009	At Home by Myself...With You	Erin	
2009	Saw VI	Tara Abbott	
2009	Doppelganger	Lenny 'The Weasel'	Short film
2010	Ninety-One	Simone	Short film
2010	Love Letter from an Open Grave	Mona	Short film
2010	Saw 3D	Tara Abbott	
2012	Seven Years	Sandra	Short film
2012	Moving Day	Brenda	
2012	Attachments	Davina	Short film
2013	Tru Love	Tru	Producer, co-director (with Kate Johnston), screenwriter
2013	Stormcloud		Short film; producer
2014	Siren	Impatient Woman	Short film
2017	Unplugged	Mom	Short film
2018	Backstabbing for Beginners	Reporter	
2019	Polaroid	Bird’s Mother	
2019	Ring Ring	Carol	Short film
2019	Business Ethics	Fräulein Stumpf	
2026	The Betrayers	Nina Semonovna	

=== Television ===
Year	Title	Role	Notes
1997	Diabolik	Naomi (voice)	Episode: "Panther Uncaged"
1998	Earth: Final Conflict	Katya Petrenko	Episode: "If You Could Read My Mind"
1999	Mythic Warriors	Lachesis (voice)	Episode: "Damon and Pythias"
1999	Tales from the Cryptkeeper	Mom (voice)	Episode: "Monsters Ate My Homework"
1999–2001	These Arms of Mine	Claire Monroe	Recurring role: 12 episodes
2003	Shattered City: The Halifax Explosion	Dr. Barbara Paxton	TV film
2003–2004	Trailer Park Boys	Officer Erica Miller	Episodes: "Where in the Fuck Is Randy's Barbeque?", "The Delusions of Officer Jim Lahey", "A Shit Leopard Can't Change Its Spots", "A Man's Gotta Eat"
2003–2005	The Blobheads	Kiki Barnes	Main. 24 episodes.
2004	The Newsroom	Yvonne	"One of Us"
2004	While I Was Gone	Detective Geary	TV film
2004	Kevin Hill	Dana Goyer	Episode: "Snack Daddy"
2005	This Is Wonderland	Jen Brooks	Episode: "208"
2005	Riding the Bus with My Sister	Nona	TV film
2006	ReGenesis	Heather Michelle	Episode: "Dim & Dimmer"
2006	Puppets Who Kill	Ophelia McCoy	Episode: "A Few Feuds"
2006	Angela's Eyes	Erika Bell	Episode: "Eyes for Windows"
2006	Sons of Butcher	Tammi (voice)	Episode: "Handlin' the Bike"
2006–2007	Jeff Ltd.	Dorota	Episodes: "Body by Jeff", "Some of My Best Friends Are Queer", "To Kill a Mocking Man", "The Auto-Fish 9000"
2007	Friends and Heroes	Jezebel / Lydia / Naomi (voice)	6 episodes
2007	The Best Years	Mary Hawke	Episode: "Mommie Dearest"
2008	Life with Derek	Olga	Episode: "Driving Lessons"
2008	Flashpoint	Ruth Skellar	Episode: "Who's George?"
2008	Paradise Falls	Grace Coleman	Episodes: "Revelations", "Crash!"
2008	Less Than Kind	Cougar	Episode: "Fight and Flight – Part 2"
2008	Testees	Amy	Episodes: "Gas Pills", "Uber-Glued", "Project X"
2009	The Listener	Margaret	Episode: "Lisa Says"
2009	Aaron Stone	Amanda Landers	Recurring role: 12 episodes
2009–2010	Being Erica	Marjorie	Episodes: "Papa Can You Hear Me?", "Physician, Heal Thyself"
2009–2011	Majority Rules!	Alana Richards	Recurring role: 11 episodes
2010	Republic of Doyle	Charlotte	Episode: "The Return of the Grievous Angel"
2010	Turn the Beat Around	Cynthia	TV film
2010	Harriet the Spy: Blog Wars	Violetta	TV film
2010	Warehouse 13	Sutton Harris	Episode: "Age Before Beauty"
2010	Lost Girl	Dean Peretti	Episode: "Oh Kappa, My Kappa"
2010	The Dating Guy	Nautica 5000 (voice)	Episode: "20,000 VJ's Under the Sea"
2011	The Kennedys	Janet Auchincloss	Episode: "The First Campaign"
2011	Salem Falls	Carol	TV film
2011	Covert Affairs	Emma	Episode: "What's the Frequency, Kenneth?"
2012	Murdoch Mysteries	Mrs. Billings	Episode: "Murdoch of the Klondike"
2012–2014	Degrassi: The Next Generation	Mrs. Novak	Episodes: "Got Your Money: Part 1", "Got Your Money: Part 2", "My Hero"
2013	Cracked	Dr. Vanessa Currie	Episodes: "What We Can't See", "The Light in Black"
2013	Waterloo Road	Yvonne Hegarty	Episode: "Love Hurts"
2013	Hard Rock Medical	Pippa	Episode: "Love, Labour, Loss"
2013	Saving Hope	Sheila Burke	Episode: "Defense"
2013	Rookie Blue	Audrey Harding	Episode: "Friday the 13th"
2013	Twelve Trees of Christmas	Better Greven	TV film
2013	Kid's Town	Sue Redshaw	Episodes: "Your File", "Reason to Stay"
2014	Remedy	Detective Parker	Episode: "Bad Blood"
2014	Reign	Hortenza de' Medici	Episode: "Higher Ground"
2014	Hemlock Grove	Dr. Galina Zhelezhnova-Burdukovskaya	Recurring role: 9 episodes
2014	The Divide	Karen Woods	Episode: "I Can't Go Back"
2014	Midnight Masquerade	Helen	TV film
2015	Bitten	Lily Bevelaqua	Episode: "Bad Dreams"
2015	The Plateaus	Young Nun #1	Episode: "1.10"
2015	Lead With Your Heart	Catherine	TV film
2016	11.22.63	Jeanne de Mohrenschildt	Episodes: "The Rabbit Hole"; "Other Voices, Other Rooms"; "Happy Birthday, Lee Harvey Oswald"
2016	Rogue	AUSA Samantha Polley	Episodes: "New Shooter", "Hardboiled", "Baggage"
2016	Group Home	Nancy	TV film
2016	A Nutcracker Christmas	Sharon	TV film
2014	Ransom	Alexis Duspleis	Episode: "Regeneration"
2017	The Girlfriend Experience	Olivia	Episode: "The List"
2018–2019	Little Dog	Tammy Mackey	Recurring role: 11 episodes
2019	Carter	Lorraine	Episode: "Harley Insisted On Wearing Pants"
2022	Workin' Moms	Tina	3 episodes

=== Video game ===
Year	Title	Role	Notes
2016	World of Warcraft: Legion		Voice

== See also ==
- List of female film and television directors
- List of LGBT-related films directed by women
