= Tanedra Howard =

American actress (born 1980)

- Born: August 15, 1980 (age 45); Inglewood, California, USA
- Education: El Camino College
- Occupation: Actress
- Years active: 2006–present

Tanedra Howard (born August 15, 1980) is an American actress. She is best known for winning the reality show Scream Queens and playing Simone Bethson in Saw VI and Saw 3D.

== Life and career ==
Howard was born and raised in Inglewood, California. She attended Santa Monica College, where she was a member of the cheer squad, as well as El Camino College. She used to work as an attractions hostess at the Disneyland Resort in Anaheim, California.

In 2006, Howard was one out of 500 actors chosen to try out for the ABC reality show I Wanna Be a Soap Star 3, but did not make it on the show. In 2008, Howard's roommate showed her an ad on Craigslist where Lionsgate was holding auditions for the VH1 acting competition reality TV show Scream Queens. She had no acting experience but auditioned and was cast. Howard spent five and half weeks competing in weekly challenges with nine other actors and won the competition, earning a role in Saw VI. In the film she played Simone, a scheming money lender. She reprises her role in Saw 3D, released on October 29, 2010.

== Filmography ==
List of films and roles
Year	Title	Role	Notes
2006	Grand Night	Graduate	Uncredited
2009	Saw VI	Simone	Role earned by winning Scream Queens TV series Nominated–Scream Awards for Most Memorable Mutilation
2010	Saw 3D	Simone	
2011	Love... Another Four Letter Word	Vanessa	
2012	Anita Ho	Tanya	
2015	Reggie Gaskins' Urban Love Story	Maryanne	
2017	Oscar	Michelle Grant	

List of television appearances and roles
Year	Title	Role	Notes
2008	Scream Queens	Herself	Winner
2010	Shane Dawson TV	Gang Customer	Episode: "Santa's Dead: A Love Story"
2013	Dairy of a Champion	Track runner #7; Howard	Episode: "Prey or Predator"; Episode: "Level Playing Field"
2013	Laugh Central	Kenya	Episode: "Basketball Wives Allstars"
2014– 2015	Black Boots	Tammy	12 episodes
2017	Off the Track	Jasmine Hyde	Episode: "Lifeless Eyes"
2019	Station 19	Date 2	Episode: "When it Rains, It Pours!"
2020	Stuck with You	Asia	Episode: "It Was All A Dream"
2022	Good Luck!	Roxy Carmichael	Television film
