= Michelle Galdenzi =

American actress

- Born: January 2, 1987 (age 39)
- Occupation: Actress/Model
- Years active: 2008–present

Michelle Galdenzi (born January 2, 1987) is an American model and reality television actress.

== Early life ==
Galdenzi is from Spring, Texas and graduated from Klein High School in 2005. While in high school, she was also involved in various theater productions including Beauty and the Beast, Noises Off, and The Musical Comedy Murders of 1940.

Galdenzi attended St. Edward's University in Austin, Texas for two years prior to attending a two-year conservatory for dramatic arts (SFT) in New York City. She was crowned the winner of Miss Junior Teen Texas (South) in 2001.

== Career ==
Galdenzi was one of ten actresses on the VH1 series Scream Queens where she was Runner-Up in the competition. The first episode aired on Monday, October 20, 2008.

Galdenzi appears in an advertisement in the magazine MAQ: Men's Athletic Quarterly in May 2008. She modeled for Dana-Maxx Pomerantz Spring/Summer line 2009. Galdenzi was in the Summer 2010 campaign for Koral Swimwear. She has modeled for Roar Clothing in 2009 and was featured in billboards in Las Vegas and Los Angeles. Galdenzi has modeled in Aruba for Wema Home and Hardware and was in an ad for Underground Clothing in the Winter 2010 edition of Island Temptations. She was also the featured cover story in Rush Magazine volume 14.

She was featured as a Young Democrat in TruthThroughAction.org's debut political short film, "Blue Balled," released June 2008. She has also appeared as an extra in Entourage and a small role in the movie Date Night, she is set to appear in the upcoming movie Thorns from a Rose as Sam.
