= Demon FM =

- England
- Broadcast area: Leicester, England

Programming
- Format: Student radio

Ownership
- Owner: De Montfort University Students' Union

History
- First air date: 29 September 1995 (Restricted Services Licence (RSL)); 4 May 2009 (Community Radio Licence); 4 May 2019 (online-only)
- Former frequencies: 106.4 FM (29 September 1995 - 26 October 1995); 106.2 FM (22 April 1996 – 19 May 1996); 107.5 FM (4 May 2009 - 4 May 2019)

Links
- Website: www.demonfm.co.uk

Demon FM is a student radio station based at De Montfort University in Leicester, England. The station broadcasts online during term time. It was established in 1995 by the Communications Officer of the time, Rob Martin. The first licensed broadcast was on 106.4 FM from 29 September 1995 to 26 October 1995 and the second broadcast was on 106.2 FM from 22 April 1996 to 19 May 1996. Demon FM continued to broadcast on restricted service licences until 2008 with the last of the RSL broadcasts taking place on 97.5FM. Demon FM finished their 26th and final RSL on 30 November 2008.

Demon FM held a community radio licence, which was awarded in June 2008 between May 2009 and 2019 with 24-hour broadcasts every day. It broadcast on 107.5FM with coverage over the Greater Leicester Area (with approximately five miles coverage from the university campus). The station had its community radio licence renewed for a further five years in 2014.

In 2018 the management board of the station chose not to apply for a second extension of its community radio licence, with its last broadcast on FM taking place on Friday 3 May 2019

Demon FM currently broadcasts during term time, solely as an internet radio station.

The station is part of De Montfort Students' Union's Demon Media Group which also comprises The Demon magazine and Demon TV.

== Community radio licence ==
Demon FM operated on short-term restricted service licences twice a year from inception in 1995 until 2008.

Following an announcement by Ofcom of a plan to issue community radio licences in the Leicester area, over the course of 2007 and 2008 the station and student union leadership, in partnership with the university, who saw an opportunity to give real broadcast experience to students of their media and radio production courses, sought and successfully applied for a community radio licence.

In 2009, with a 24/7 licence, the station started broadcasting on 107.5FM, moving from a single room studio in the Students' Union to a suite of recently completed radio studios in the university campus' Queen's Building. To comply with the terms of their licence the station was, for the first time in their history, required to allow non-student members of the local community to present shows and involve themselves in day-to-day running of the station.

In 2018, after nearly a decade of holding a community radio licence, and with the renewal of their broadcast licence due, the management team of the station chose not to extend their licence, opting instead to run an online-only service targeted at, produced by, and solely run by, De Montfort University students – privately citing the cost and administration burden of running a regulated radio station, and an unwillingness to service non-student broadcasters as the reason for their desire not to renew their community radio licence.

Another local community radio station, Leicester Community Radio, had indicated a desire to take over the licence, but De Montfort University Students' Union elected to instead hand back the license to Ofcom, to allow for a fair bidding and award procedure.

Ofcom subsequently announced they have no immediate plans for to advertise any further FM community radio licences in Leicester, leaving the station's former frequency vacant for the foreseeable future.

== Station facilities ==
Producer console in the old Campus Centre studio

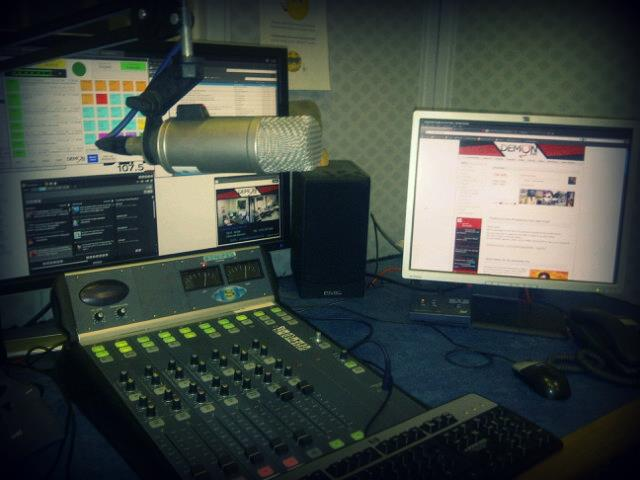
Producer Console in Queens Building Studio 1 (One of the smaller studios)

Demon FM broadcasts from the Creative Technology Studios within De Montfort University's 'Queens Building'. It previously broadcast from various locations, including the Students' Union's 'Campus Centre' building.

In addition to studio facilities, equipment is available for hire, and pre-production facilities are available to students involved in Demon FM so they can prepare material for their shows.

The station typically runs several outside broadcasts per year including coverage of Varsity sports matches between De Montfort University and the University of Leicester.

The current studio is the fourth building that Demon FM has occupied. The original studio was a portable building behind the original Students' Union building, with fairly basic equipment.

In around the year 2000 the station moved into a small brick building which had previously been a campus branch of NatWest bank.

Upon the construction of De Montfort University's new Campus Centre building at the Eastern end of Mill Lane in 2003, with the first floor dedicated to students' union facilities, and the incorporation of De Montfort Students' Union, the station obtained space for a dedicated studio which included a purpose-built floating room to house the station's main studio. The station moved into the newly built facilities and began broadcasting from them that year.

Following the award of the station's community radio licence, the majority of programming moved to being broadcast from the Creative Technology Studios in DMU's Queen's Building. The station's Campus Centre studio was eventually decommissioned in around 2012.

In 2016 De Montfort University funded renovation of the radio control room from which Demon FM broadcasts. The current setup includes bespoke radio furniture for both talk-based programming and DJ-led shows.

== Station management ==
The day-to-day running of the station is performed by a student committee, elected and appointed annually by members of Demon Media. This committee is overseen by a board consisting of senior officials from the university, students' union, members of industry, and several students.

== Awards ==
Demon FM won national recognition at the annual Student Radio Awards in 2001 winning the Best Student Station award, following it up in 2007 by taking home the bronze award.

A number of Demon FM nominees and winners have also gone on to notable careers in the radio and audio industries. In 2010 Talksport presenter Will Gavin was nominated for Best Male Presenter, while a year later in 2011 Formula E, Talksport and former Virgin Radio UK presenter Jon Jackson received the Bronze Award.

In April 2020, the station was nominated for 30 Student Radio Amplify Awards.

== Student Radio Association ==
Demon FM is a member of the Student Radio Association, the national organisation set up to support student radio stations in the UK. Many of the station's members have actively supported the association through voluntary committee positions, taking on tasks such as organisation of the annual Student Radio Awards.
