= Irving Resnick =

American mob figure, boxing manager and promoter, and professional basketball player

Irving "Ash" Resnick (March 6, 1916 – January 18, 1989) was an American mob figure, gambler, boxing promoter and manager. Resnick was also a former college and professional basketball player. He played for the New York University's basketball team from 1936 to 1939, and then, for five seasons during the period between 1939 and 1948, for teams in Washington, D.C., Baltimore, Trenton, and Paterson of the American Basketball League (a United States professional basketball league that ran from 1925 to 1955). He was also an Army veteran, serving there between 1942 and 1945.

== Early life ==
Irving Resnick was born and raised in Brooklyn, New York.

== Basketball career ==
In 1936, at the age of 20, Resnick joined the N.Y.U. N.C.A.A. basketball team. There are no records as far as Resnick's NCAA stats, but he was good enough to be signed by the Washington team of the ABL. In his first year there, Resnick played in eight games, scoring 15 points, for an average of 1.9 points per game.

For the ABL's 1940–41 season, Resnick played for the Baltimore team, where he saw action in two games, scoring three points, for an average of 1.5 points per game. After that, and between 1941 and 1942, Resnick played for West Haven, the New York Celtics, Troy and New London, all teams of minor or independent basketball leagues.

=== Military service ===
Resnick then served, from 1942 to 1945 during World War II, in the United States Army.

=== Rest of professional basketball career ===
Resnick, after World War II and his service in the Army were over, signed with the ABL's Trenton franchise for the 1945-46 season. Resnick's stats had a marked improvement for that season, as he played in thirty one games and scored 337 points, for an average of 10.8 points scored per game. After that ABL season was over, he returned to the Independent league's Celtics (not to be confused with the N.B.A. team, the Boston Celtics) a team which had now moved to Troy. Then, Resnick got traded from the Celtics to the Indianapolis Kautskys, another independent league franchise.

Before the ABL's 1946–47 season began, the Troy team had joined the Trenton ABL team and thus the franchise became known as Trenton-Troy. Resnick essentially rejoined the teams at Troy and Trenton when the 1946–47 Trenton-Troy season began, and he surprised fans and experts alike by leading the league in scoring that year, scoring 563 points in thirty five games played, for an average of 16.1 points per game. The 1946–47 season would be Resnick's best as a professional basketball player.

For the 1947–48 season, Resnick played for the team in Paterson. Injuries, however, limited him to only six games played. He scored 36 points, for a scoring average of 6.0 points per game. "Ash" Resnick then decided to retire from professional basketball. In 82 ABL games played, Resnick scored a total of 854 points, for an average of 10.41 points scored per game.

== Criminal career ==
Resnick became involved with gambling operations during the 1940s. He later admitted that he had a gambling conviction during that decade, the conviction taking place before he moved to Las Vegas, Nevada, in 1949.

Resnick has been credited with helping to organize gambling in Las Vegas. He was a central figure at many of the city's hotels' operations, most notably at the Dunes hotel, where he started the city's first game of baccarat. Resnick was also involved with the Caesars Palace hotel for some time, befriending, among others, legendary boxer Joe Louis and bringing legendary basketball player Wilt Chamberlain there. Resnick also worked at the Tropicana, El Rancho, Thunderbird and Maxim hotels.

A 1968 report from the F.B.I.'s Philadelphia office reported suspicions that Resnick was also friends with legendary mob figures such as Meyer Lansky and Vincent Alo.

In 1974, Resnick was convicted for tax evasion, in connection with an alleged skimming of $300,000 which the U.S. government said Resnick took from the Caesars Palace hotel's casino without paying taxes. The conviction was later overturned. That same year (1974), Resnick survived an attempt on his life, when eight sticks of dynamite were found under his car. In 1976, he survived a second attack on his life, when he was shot while leaving the Caesars Palace.

Resnick was also suspected of being an associate of the Patriarca crime family of New England.

=== Sonny Liston ===
Notable professional boxer Sonny Liston was the former heavyweight boxing champion of the world, when Liston went to Las Vegas to train for his rematch with Muhammad Ali. In Las Vegas, Liston met Resnick and his friend, the fellow former world heavyweight boxing champion, Joe Louis, who, according to F.B.I. files, was by now working for Resnick as an enforcer during Resnick's money-collecting visits to gamblers who had gambling debts to pay for.

Resnick and Liston became close; Resnick would hang out with the boxer and buy him clothes and other items. According to an unidentified F.B.I. source, however, before Liston's first fight with Ali, Resnick called him (the F.B.I. source) and told him to bet on Liston and that Liston would win that fight by a second-round knockout. When Ali beat Liston in the seventh-round, Resnick lost a lot of money. However, a Houston, Texas, gambler named Barnett Magids has been reported as telling the F.B.I. during an interview, that Resnick advised him not to place any bets on the fight, and to just watch it on television and see how it (the first Ali-Liston match) unfolded. According to the Magids interview, Resnick knew Liston would lose the bout.

Resnick became Liston's manager, a position he shared with a man named Jack Nilon. Nilon later declared that, for Ali-Liston II, as the former champion Liston trained in Miami Beach, Florida, Resnick, who had accompanied Liston to training camp, bet a lot of money on Liston for Liston to defeat Ali at some Florida casinos. Ali won that fight by a first-round knockout.

Liston was found dead by his wife, Geraldine Liston, at their Las Vegas home on January 5, 1971. Liston's death was ruled as happening from a heroin overdose by investigators, but there have been several conspiracy theories over the years about it. Resnick has been tied to a number of them, including one told by a former Las Vegas policeman named Larry Gandy during 2014 to American book writer Shaun Assael for Assael's book The Murder of Sonny Liston. Gandy told Assael that drug dealer Earl Cage had Liston murdered, but in 1982, a police informant named Irwin Peters had said that it was Gandy who murdered Liston and that Resnick had hired him (Gandy) to kill the boxer, by way of a lethal heroin injection, over a monetary debt Liston had with Resnick. None of the conspiracy theories or declarations have been found to be true, and Liston's death remains, officially, as caused by an accidental heroin overdose. Informant Peters also died in mysterious circumstances: in 1987, he was found dead inside his car; the police blamed his death on a faulty car exhaust; Peters' family, however, believes that foul play was involved in Peters' death.

== Personal life ==
Resnick married part time singer and nightclub owner Marilyn Johnson, who was 20 years younger than him, in 1958. Johnson was a beauty pageant winner who had been crowned "Miss Hollywood" and participated in the Miss California contest, where she won the right to participate at a Las Vegas hotel opening. In Las Vegas, Resnick and Johnson met in 1957. The couple had two daughters: Dana, who was born in 1959, and Lara.

Also, Resnick may have had a son from an alleged extramarital relationship he had with a woman named Judy during the early 1980s. The alleged son, named David Jones, is an entertainer who has met with Dana and Lara on several occasions.

== Death ==
Resnick was diagnosed, later in life, with cancer. He died on Wednesday, January 18, 1989, of heart failure. He is interred at Palm Memorial Park (also known as "Palm Eastern Cemetery") in Las Vegas, Nevada.
