= Marek Posival =

Czech-born Canadian screenwriter, producer, actor and film director

Marek Posival (born April 1, 1963, in Prague) is a Czech-born Canadian screenwriter, producer, actor and film director.

== Biography ==
Posival was born in Prague in what was then communist Czechoslovakia. He escaped the totalitarian regime in 1983 and lived for a year in a refugee camp in West Germany. He then emigrated to Toronto. He attended York University, earning a Honours BFA in Film Production.

=== Film career ===
He is best known as a producer of feature films, primarily of the thriller, horror or drama genre. He has produced a large number of Christmas movies as well.

Posival wrote and directed a highly regarded short film called Hold-Up and worked with Deepa Mehta as Associate Producer on the feature film Water, which was among the five nominees for Best Foreign Language Film at the 2006 Academy Awards.

In 2007, he produced a feature film Phantom Punch, a period drama about the life of the controversial heavyweight boxing champion Sonny Liston, which he produced together with Hassain Zaidi and Ving Rhames.

A script penned by Posival, The Tortured, which was directed by Robert Lieberman, was released in 2010. Posival also worked on the project as one of the film's producers, together with Mark Burg and Oren Koules of Twisted Pictures.

In 2018, he co-produced Stockholm, a feature film about the bank heist that gave origin to the term Stockholm syndrome, starring Ethan Hawke, Noomi Rapace and Mark Strong.

Between 2010 and 2021, he has served as producer or executive producer on over thirty Christmas-themed films for television.

He is married to the talent agent Karen Williams-Posival of The Characters Talent Agency. They have a production company MP Productions where they develop feature film properties.

Posival's trademark plot-line tends to involve brutal violence interrupting the banal lives of people inclined to "go with the flow".

He has also directed numerous commercials and was a regular on the TV series The Best Years.
