= Lynn Colliar =

Canadian television anchor

- Born: Lynn Colliar; 22 November 1967 (age 57); St Andrews, Scotland

Lynn Colliar (born 22 November 1967) is a Canadian television anchor.

== Biography ==
Colliar was born in Scotland and grew up in Port Coquitlam, British Columbia. She is a graduate of Port Coquitlam Senior Secondary and went on to SFU where she graduated with a degree in biology. Colliar worked at veterinary clinics as an assistant for seven years. She then enrolled in the two-year Broadcast Journalism program at the British Columbia Institute of Technology.

=== Television career ===
In 1991, Colliar went to work at Global BC, where she began as a newswriter before moving to a full-time reporting position. Her production, "A Shred of Evidence", a half-hour special, was awarded the Excellence in News Reporting Award by the British Columbia Association of Broadcasters. The production dealt with how intricate scientific details pieced together as evidence led to convictions in major B.C. homicides.

In 2005 Colliar was inducted into the Terry Fox Wall of Fame. From 1998 to 2001, she was the channel's sole morning news anchor. 10 September 2010 marked Colliar's last day as a co-anchor with Steve Darling on the Global BC's Morning News. On 27 September 2010, she began her new role as Senior Investigative Reporter for the News Hour. She is now back on the anchor desk anchoring the Saturday and Sunday Morning News.

On 15 November 2018, Colliar decided to step away from Global BC & journalism to focus on her career as a mom.

=== Acting career ===
Colliar had a minor role in Watchmen as an anchor and in the horror thriller film The Tortured. She has been an anchor or reporter on several local productions, including last season's "The Killing".
