= Phantom Punch (film) =

2008 film by Robert Townsend

- Directed by: Robert Townsend
- Written by: Ryan Combs
- Produced by: Hassain Zaidi; Marek Posival; Ving Rhames; Byron A. Martin
- Starring: Ving Rhames; Stacey Dash; Nicholas Turturro; Alan van Sprang; David Proval; Bridgette Wilson
- Cinematography: John Dyer
- Edited by: Michael Doherty
- Music by: Stephen James Taylor
- Production company: Access Motion Pictures
- Distributed by: Screen Media Films
- Release date: September 2008
- Running time: 104 minutes
- Country: United States
- Language: English

Phantom Punch is a 2008 film directed by Robert Townsend. The film is a biopic of Sonny Liston, with Ving Rhames in the lead role. The film also stars Stacey Dash, Nicholas Turturro, Alan van Sprang, David Proval, and Bridgette Wilson.

== Plot ==
In 1950, Liston was serving a prison sentence in Missouri State Penitentiary. After knocking out the prison boxing champ Big Lester in a brawl over cigarettes, the prison athletic director Father Alois coached him to hone his boxing skills. In the ring, he knocked out Big Lester again, followed by several other contenders. Having shown improvement, he was released after serving just two years of a five-year sentence.

Upon his release in 1952, he joined a boxing gym in St. Louis, Missouri, run by Caesar Novak at the recommendation of Father Alois. His fellow inmate, Catfish, later arrives to act as his cut man. During this time, Liston takes part in several matches and meets his future wife, Geraldine. He visits Father Alois, now working in a church, to thank him and tell him about Geraldine. Sitting in a parked car with Geraldine at night, he is told by a policeman to move his car along, which escalates into a fistfight and another prison sentence for Liston. Geraldine greets him at his release in 1957 and invites him to live with her at a house being rented to her by her cousin after getting married at a justice of the peace on the way. Liston experiences nightmares remembering abuse suffered at the hands of his father.

Caesar Novak takes Liston back to his gym as a fighter and asks him to stay out of prison. One night, the policemen from the previous altercation stop by Liston's house and threaten him, telling him that he must throw any future fight against Floyd Patterson. In 1962, Novak attacks Bobby Zazo in a club in a dispute over Farah, a girl Novak stole from him, and arranges through mutual organized crime connections to pay Zazo $10,000 in retribution. Mob connections pressure Novak to tell Liston to dive into the upcoming match against Patterson so that they can win on a bet, but Novak asks Liston to win instead. Liston wins the match by knockout, but no press arrives to interview the new champion. When approached by his organized crime connections, Novak explains that he bet their money on Liston and made them $1.2 million.

Liston is approached by the police and teased about his inability to write a message with his signature because of his lack of education. They attempt to pin a drunk driving charge on him, even though he is walking, and another fistfight ensues. That night in jail, he is seriously beaten by the correction officers and told to get out of town, or he will be killed. Novak takes him to Las Vegas, where Sonny and Geraldine buy a new house in December 1962, as the relationship between Caesar and Farah is falling apart.

In July 1963, Patterson and Liston fought a rematch, which Liston won easily. Farah pretends that Caesar has called for Sonny, but when Sonny arrives, Farrah merely requests sex, and the two cheat on their respective partner. Novak waits outside Zazo's hotel room to threaten him to stop spreading rumors that Liston's fights are fixed and discovers him leaving the room with Farah. Farah and Sonny continue to meet for sex but find no romance in their relationship.

Liston is surprised by Cassius Clay's unusual style in their boxing match and asks Catfish to spread an irritating substance on his gloves to bother Clay's eyes. The irritant works, but Liston nevertheless gives up the fight. Geraldine surprises Sonny and Farah with a gun at their next rendezvous and tells Farah to leave, then tells Sonny that she hopes Cassius Clay beats him again. Already upset, Liston flies into a rage when provoked by the press with questions about the murder of Bobby Zazo and his connection to Caesar Novak. Liston asks Father Alois why others fail to give him the love they give to other fighters, and the priest tells him that he cannot rely on the validation of others to determine his worth and that he has always been able to accomplish things through his inner strengths.

Liston loses the rematch against Cassius Clay, now known as Muhammad Ali, after falling for 20 seconds following the famous phantom punch. Many cannot see the punch, and the press once again attacks Liston, accusing him of taking a dive. Caesar's mob connections are likewise suspicious, but after speaking with Sonny, he convinces them that Sonny was not throwing the fight. Liston works his way back up in the rankings with a record of 14–1 in fights around the world between 1966 and 1969. The mob tells Caesar to tell Sonny to start taking dives and also inform him of the meetings between Sonny and Farah. Caesar confronts Farah and physically attacks her in jealous anger, then throws her out. Out of spite, he lies to the mob that Sonny refuses to dive, hoping that Sonny will end up getting hurt because of this. In 1971, Geraldine returns home from a trip to find Sonny dead. The police officially declare it a heroin overdose, though doubts about this explanation persist.

== Cast ==
- Ving Rhames as Sonny Liston
- Nicholas Turturro as Caesar Novak
- Stacey Dash as Geraldine Liston
- Alan van Sprang as Nico Orso
- David Proval as Savino
- Bridgette Wilson as Farah
- Rick Roberts as Father Alios
- Joseph Motiki as Announcer Trent Mays

== See also ==
- List of boxing films
