= Sonny Liston =

American boxer (c. 1930–1970)

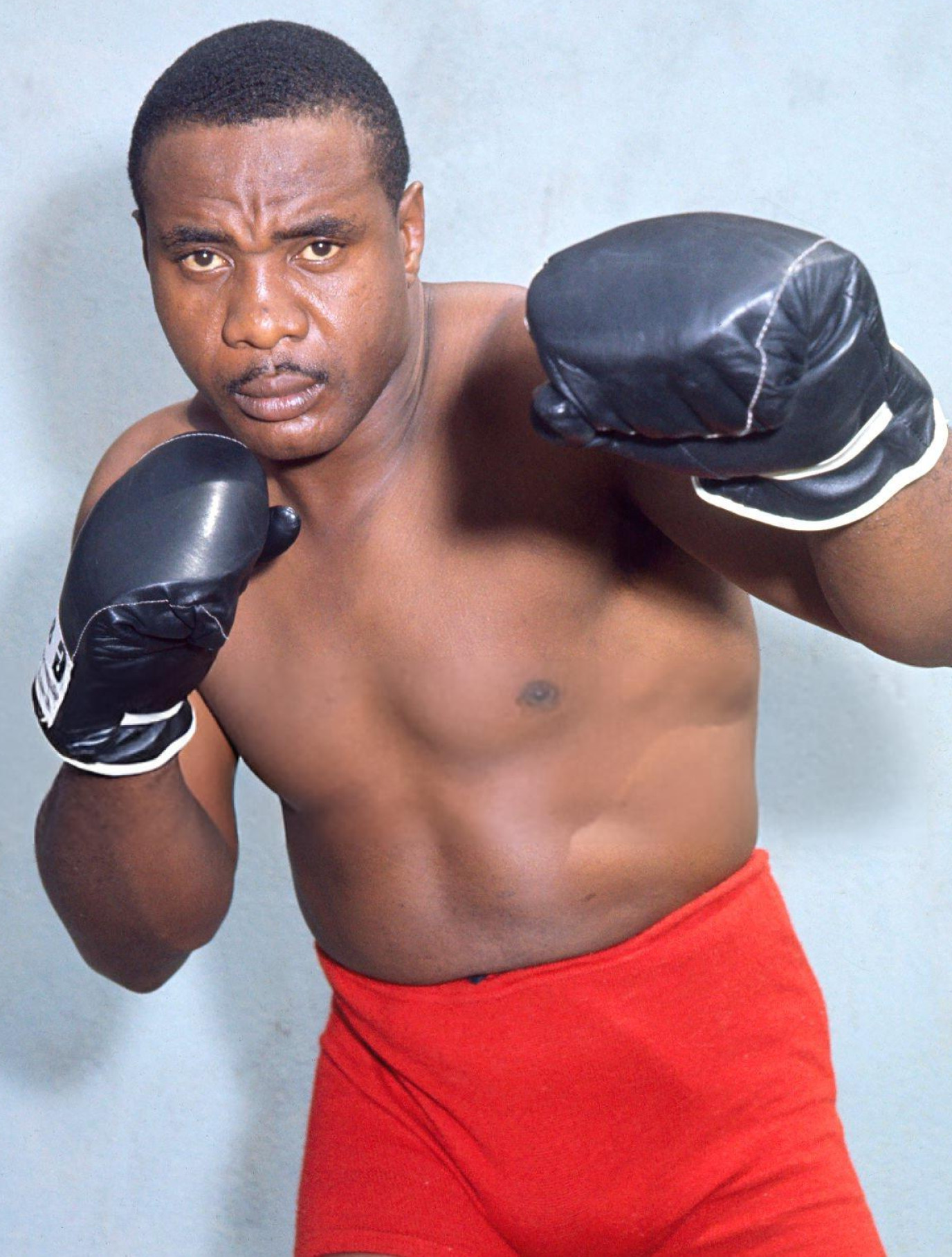
- Liston in 1962

Personal information
- Nickname: The Big Bear
- Born: Charles L. Liston c. 1930 Sand Slough, Arkansas, U.S.
- Died: December 30, 1970 (aged c. 40) Las Vegas, Nevada, U.S.
- Height: 6 ft 1 in (185 cm)
- Weight: Heavyweight

Boxing career
- Reach: 84 in (213 cm) (Note: Sources vary on his reach, with some listing it as 80½ in)
- Stance: Orthodox

Boxing record
- Total fights: 54
- Wins: 50
- Win by KO: 39
- Losses: 4
Medal record
Men's amateur boxing
Chicago Golden Gloves
| Gold medal – first place | Chicago 1953 | Heavyweight |
Intercity Golden Gloves
| Gold medal – first place | Chicago 1953 | Light-heavyweight |

Charles L. "Sonny" Liston (c. 1930 – December 30, 1970), nicknamed "the Big Bear", was an American professional boxer who competed from 1953 until his death in 1970. A dominant contender of his era, he became the undisputed world heavyweight champion in 1962 after knocking out Floyd Patterson in the first round, repeating the knockout the following year in defense of the title; in the latter fight he also became the inaugural WBC heavyweight champion. Often regarded as one of the greatest boxers of all time, Liston is known for his immense strength, formidable jab, long reach, toughness, and is widely regarded as one of the most intimidating men in boxing history.

Although Liston was widely regarded as unbeatable, he lost the title in 1964 to Muhammad Ali (then known as Cassius Clay), who entered as an 8:1 underdog. Liston retired in his corner due to an inflamed shoulder. Controversy followed with claims that Liston had been drinking heavily the night before the fight and had entered the bout with a lame shoulder. In his 1965 rematch with Ali, Liston suffered an unexpected first-round knockout that led to unresolved suspicions of a fix. He was still a world-ranked boxer when he died under mysterious circumstances in 1970.

The Ring magazine ranks Liston as the tenth greatest heavyweight of all time, while boxing writer Herb Goldman ranked him second and Richard O'Brien, Senior Editor of Sports Illustrated, placed him third. Alfie Potts Harmer in The Sportster also ranked him the third greatest heavyweight and the sixth greatest boxer at any weight. Liston was inducted to the International Boxing Hall of Fame in 1991.

== Early life ==
=== Family ===
Charles "Sonny" Liston was born circa 1930 into a sharecropping family that farmed the poor land of Morledge Plantation near Johnson Township, St. Francis County, Arkansas. His father, Tobe Liston, was in his mid-40s when he and his wife, Helen Baskin, who was almost 30 years younger than Tobe, moved to Arkansas from Mississippi in 1916. Helen had one child before she married Tobe, and Tobe had 13 children with his first wife. Tobe and Helen had 12 children together; Sonny was the second-youngest child.

=== Date of birth ===
There is no official record of Liston's birth as his family's home state of Arkansas did not make birth certificates mandatory until 1965. His family, but not Charles (or Sonny) Liston, can be found in the 1930 census, and in the 1940 census he was listed as 10 years old. It has been suggested Liston himself may not have known what year he was born, as he was not precise on the matter. Liston believed his date of birth to be May 8, 1932, and used this for official purposes but by the time he won the world title an aged appearance added credence to rumors that he was actually several years older. One writer concluded that Liston's most plausible date of birth was July 22, 1930, citing census records and statements from his mother during her lifetime.

=== Youth ===
Tobe Liston inflicted whippings so severe on Sonny that the scars were still visible decades later. "The only thing my old man ever gave me was a beating," Liston said. In 1946, Helen Baskin, along with some of her children, moved to St. Louis to seek factory work. Liston—aged around 13, according to his later reckonings—remained in Arkansas with his father. The following year, Sonny—determined to reunite with his mother and siblings—thrashed the pecans from his brother-in-law's tree and sold them in Forrest City, Arkansas. With the proceeds, he traveled to St. Louis to live with his mother. Liston tried going to school but quickly left after jeers about his illiteracy; the only employment he could obtain was sporadic and exploitative.

Liston turned to crime and led a gang of thugs who committed muggings and armed robberies. Because of the shirt he wore during robberies, the St. Louis police called Liston the "Yellow Shirt Bandit." When caught in January 1950, Liston gave his age as 20, while the St. Louis Globe-Democrat reported that he was 22. Convicted and sentenced to five years in the Missouri State Penitentiary, Liston started his prison time on June 1, 1950.

Liston never complained about prison, saying he was guaranteed three meals every day. The athletic director at Missouri State Penitentiary, Rev. Alois Stevens, suggested to Liston that he try boxing, and his obvious aptitude, along with an endorsement from Stevens, who was also a priest, aided Liston in getting an early parole. Stevens organized a sparring session with a professional heavyweight named Thurman Wilson to showcase Liston's potential. After two rounds, Wilson had taken enough. "Better get me out of this ring," exclaimed Wilson, "he is going to kill me!" Stevens stated about Liston that "He was the most perfect specimen of manhood I had ever seen" noting that Liston had "Powerful arms, big shoulders. Pretty soon he was knocking out everybody in the gym. His hands were so large! I couldn't believe it".

== Amateur career ==
After Liston was released from prison on October 31, 1952, he had a brief amateur career that spanned less than a year. Liston captured the Chicago Golden Gloves Tournament of Champions on March 6, 1953, with a victory over 1952 Olympic Heavyweight Champion Ed Sanders. He then outpointed Julius Griffin, winner of the New York Golden Gloves Tournament of Champions, to capture the Intercity Golden Gloves Championship on March 26 (representing Chicago). Liston was knocked down in the first round, but came back to control the next two rounds and had Griffin hanging on at the end.

Liston competed in the 1953 United States National Championships at Boston Garden and passed the preliminaries, stopping Lou Graff in the second round on April 13, but lost in the quarterfinals to 17-year-old Jimmy McCarter on April 15. He would later employ McCarter as a sparring partner.

On June 23, 1953, a team consisting of ten recent St. Louis Golden Gloves champions of all weight classes, with Liston on top as the heavyweight, was gathered to represent the United States in an International Golden Gloves (USA vs. West Europe) competition at Kiel Auditorium in St. Louis. Liston knocked out Hermann Schreibauer of West Germany at 2:16 of the first round. The previous month, Schreibauer had won a bronze medal in the European Championships. At this time, the head coach of the St. Louis Golden Gloves team, Tony Anderson, stated that Liston was the strongest fighter he had seen.

== Professional career ==
=== Early fights ===
Liston signed a contract in September 1953, proclaiming: "Whatever you tell me to do, I'll do." The only backers willing to put up the necessary money for him to turn professional were close to underworld figures, and Liston supplemented his income by working for racketeers as an intimidator-enforcer. The connections to organized crime were an advantage early in his career but were later used against him.

Liston made his professional debut on September 2, 1953, knocking out Don Smith in the first round in St. Louis, where he fought his first five bouts. He was 6 ft 1 in (1.85 m), and had an exceptionally powerful physique, with a disproportionately long reach at 84 inches (2.13 m). His fists measured 15 inches (38 cm) around, the largest of any heavyweight champion. Sports Illustrated writer Mort Sharnik said his hands "looked like cannonballs when he made them into fists." Liston's noticeably more muscular left arm, crushing left jab and powerful left hook lent credence to the widely held belief that he was left-handed, although he fought in an orthodox stance.

Early in his career, Liston faced capable opponents. In his sixth bout, he faced ranked heavyweight Johnny Summerlin (18–1–2) on national television and won in an eight-round decision. In his next fight, he had a rematch with Summerlin and again won an eight-round decision. Both fights were in Summerlin's hometown of Detroit.

On September 7, 1954, Liston suffered defeat for the first time in his eighth professional fight, losing to Marty Marshall, a journeyman with an awkward style. In the third round, Marshall nailed Liston—reportedly while he was laughing—and broke his jaw. A stoic Liston finished the fight, but lost in an eight-round split decision. On April 21, 1955, he defeated Marshall in a rematch, dropping him four times en route to a sixth-round knockout. They fought for a third time on March 6, 1956, which Liston won by a ten-round unanimous decision.

Liston's criminal record, compounded by a personal association with a notorious labor racketeer, led to the police stopping him on sight, and he began to avoid main streets. On May 5, 1956, a policeman confronted Liston and a friend about a cab parked near Liston's home. Liston assaulted the officer, breaking his knee and gashing his face. He also took his gun. He claimed the officer used racial slurs. A widely publicized account of Liston resisting arrest—even after nightsticks were allegedly broken over his skull—added to the public perception of him as a nightmarish "monster" impervious to physical punishment. He was paroled after serving six months of a nine-month sentence, and was not prohibited from boxing during 1957. Liston later had another altercation with an officer, leaving him headfirst inside of a trash can. After repeated overnight detention by the St. Louis police and a thinly veiled threat to his life, Liston left for Philadelphia.

=== March to the title ===
In 1958, Liston returned to boxing. He won eight fights that year, six by knockout. Liston was training in the stable of Eddie Yawitz, who along with Bernie Glickman, managed welterweight champion Virgil Akins. Yawitz and Glickman would be subpoenaed to testify in the grand jury trial of mafia soldier Frankie Carbo. The same year, he was shifted to a new manager, Joseph "Pep" Barone, who was a front man for Frankie Carbo and Frank "Blinky" Palermo. The year 1959 was a banner one for Liston: after knocking out contender Mike DeJohn in six rounds he faced Cleveland Williams, a fast-handed fighter who was billed as the hardest-hitting heavyweight in the world against whom he showed durability, power and skill, nullifying Williams' best work before stopping him in the third round. This victory is regarded by some as Liston's most impressive performance. He rounded out the year by stopping Nino Valdez and Willi Besmanoff.

In 1960, Liston won five more fights, including a rematch with Williams, who lasted only two rounds. Roy Harris, who had gone 13 rounds with Floyd Patterson in a title match, was crushed in one round by Liston. Top contender Zora Folley was stopped in three rounds. After demolishing these top-ranked fighters in the heavyweight division, Liston was regarded as the top-contender champion-in-waiting.

Liston's streak of nine straight knockout victories ended when he won a unanimous twelve-round decision against Eddie Machen on September 7, 1960. Machen's mobility enabled him to go the distance but he was clearly outpointed despite Liston being penalised for a low blow in the 11th round. Machen's taunting and his spoiling tactics of dodging and grappling—at one point almost heaving Liston over the ropes—so alienated the audience that Liston received unaccustomed support from the crowd.

=== Title challenge delay ===
Liston became the No. 1 contender in 1960, but the handlers of world heavyweight champion Floyd Patterson refused to give him a shot at the title citing Liston's links to organized crime. While Liston began working into shape with hopes for a heavyweight title shot, he also continued his criminal behavior. Two more arrests—for disorderly conduct and resisting arrest and another for impersonating a cop—led to Liston being suspended by the Pennsylvania Athletic Commission on July 14, 1961. The suspension was honored in all states. Ironically, Patterson's manager, Cus D'Amato, associated with racketeers and had his manager's license revoked by the New York State Athletic Commission for alleged misconduct in connection with the Floyd Patterson vs. Ingemar Johansson title fight in June 1959.

Civic leaders were also reluctant, worrying that Liston's unsavory character would set a bad example for youth. The NAACP had urged Patterson not to fight Liston, fearing that a Liston victory would hurt the civil rights movement. Many African-Americans disdained Liston. Asked by a young white reporter why he was not fighting for freedom in the South, Liston deadpanned, "I ain't got no dog-proof ass.", referring to the use of police dogs against protesters. However, in 1963 in the aftermath of the 16th Street Baptist Church bombing, Liston broke off a European boxing exhibition tour to return home and was quoted as saying he was "ashamed to be in America."

U.S. President John F. Kennedy also did not want Patterson to fight Liston. When Patterson met with the president in January 1962, Kennedy suggested that Patterson avoid Liston, citing Justice Department concerns over Liston's ties to organized crime.

Jack Dempsey spoke for many when he was quoted as saying that Sonny Liston should not be allowed to fight for the title. Liston angrily responded by questioning whether Dempsey's failure to serve in World War I qualified him to moralize. Frustrated, Liston changed his management in 1961 and applied pressure through the media by remarking that Patterson, who had faced mostly white challengers since becoming champion, was drawing the color line against his own race. Patterson maintained, however, that he desperately wanted to fight Liston all the while, but was blocked by aforementioned trainer Cus D'Amato, subsequently contributing to his firing.

=== Patterson vs. Liston ===
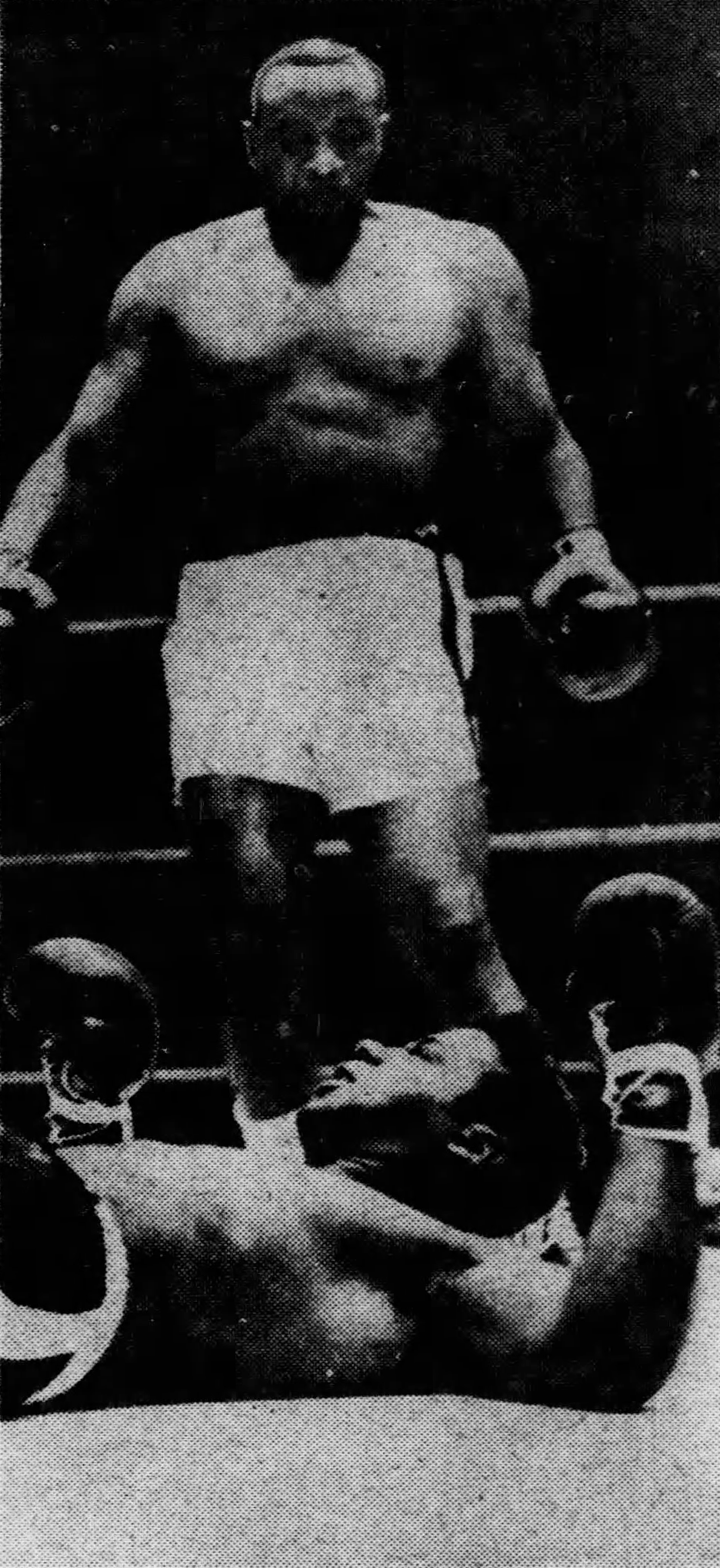
Liston standing over Patterson in the ring

Patterson finally signed to meet Liston for the world title on September 25, 1962, in Comiskey Park in Chicago. Leading up to the fight, Liston was an 8:5 betting favorite, although many picked Patterson to win. In an Associated Press poll, 64 of 102 reporters picked Patterson. Sports Illustrated predicted a Patterson victory in 15 rounds, stating: "Sonny has neither Floyd's speed nor the versatility of his attack. He is a relatively elementary, one-track fighter." Former champions James J. Braddock, Jersey Joe Walcott, Ezzard Charles, Rocky Marciano and Ingemar Johansson all picked Patterson to win. Muhammad Ali (at the time a rising contender named Cassius Clay), however, predicted a knockout by Liston in the first five rounds.

The fight turned out to be a mismatch. Liston, with a 25-pound weight advantage, 214 lb (97 kg) to 189 lb (86 kg), knocked out Patterson at 2:06 of the first round, putting him down for the count with a powerful left hook to the jaw. Sports Illustrated writer Gilbert Rogin wrote that "that final left hook crashed into Patterson's cheek like a diesel rig going downhill, no brakes." It was the third-fastest knockout in a world heavyweight title fight, and the first time the defending champion had been knocked out in round one.

Rogin wrote that Patterson backers expected him to "go inside on Liston, fire away and then run like a thief in the night. He would not close in until the accumulated inside damage and Liston's own frustration had sapped the challenger's strength and will." Patterson's fatal mistake was that he "did not punch enough and frequently tried to clinch with Liston. ... In these feckless clinches he only managed to tie up one of Liston's arms. A grateful Liston found there was no need to give chase. The victim sought out the executioner." Rogin discounted speculation that Patterson had thrown the fight, writing: "The genesis of all this wide-eyed theorizing and downright baloney was the fact that many spectators failed to see the knockout blows."

=== World heavyweight champion ===
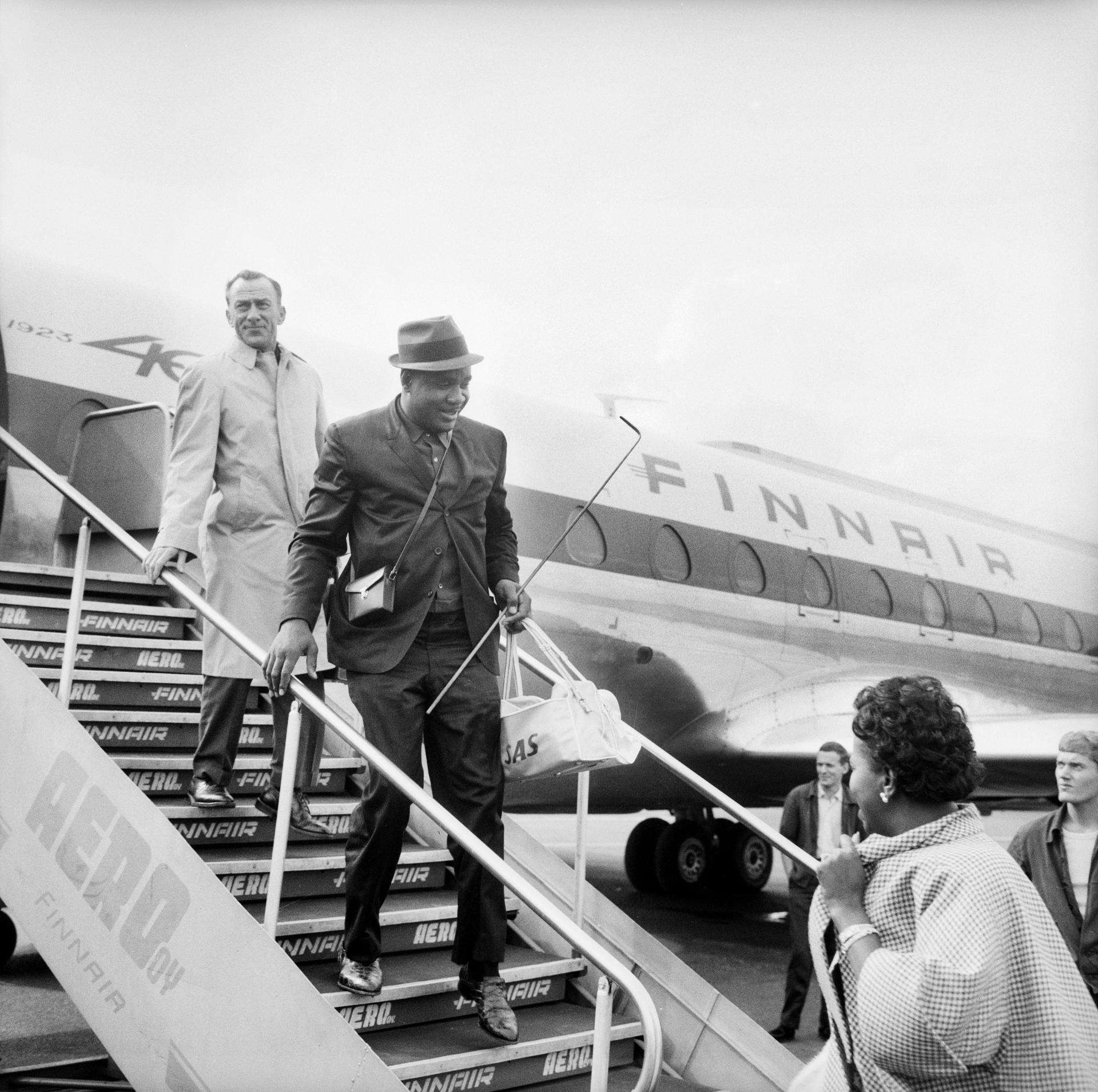
Liston during a visit to Finland in 1963

Upon winning the world heavyweight title, Liston had a speech prepared for the crowd that friends had assured him would meet him at the Philadelphia airport. But upon arrival, Liston was met by only a handful of reporters and public-relations staff. Writer Jack McKinney said, "I watched Sonny. His eyes swept the whole scene. ... You could feel the deflation, see the look of hurt in his eyes. ... He had been deliberately snubbed. Philadelphia wanted nothing to do with him." People describe Sonny's disappointment further, recalling his shoulders slumping and all joy being removed from his demeanor. This point, the absence of a crowd or parade upon his arrival, is marked by many as Sonny's abandonment of any hope of being accepted as a champion. From this point forward, he would play into the stereotypes that reporters bestowed on him, departing from any efforts to appear amiable and affectionate to the public.

During an era when white journalists still described black athletes in stereotypes, Liston had long been a target of racially charged slurs; he was called a "gorilla" and "a jungle beast" in print. Larry Merchant, then a writer with the Philadelphia Daily News, wrote: "A celebration for Philadelphia's first heavyweight champ is now in order. ... Emily Post would probably recommend a ticker-tape parade. For confetti we can use torn-up arrest warrants." He also wrote that Liston's win over Patterson proved that "in a fair fight between good and evil, evil must win." Some writers thought Liston brought bad press on himself by a surly and hostile attitude toward journalists. He also had a reputation for bullying people such as porters and waitresses.

Liston's run-ins with the police had continued in Philadelphia. He particularly resented a 1961 arrest by a black patrolman for loitering, claiming to have merely been signing autographs and chatting with fans outside a drugstore. A month later, Liston was accused of impersonating a police officer by using a flashlight to wave down a female motorist in Fairmount Park, although all charges were later dropped. Subsequently, Liston spent some months in Denver where a Catholic priest who acted as his spiritual adviser attempted to help bring his drinking under control. After he won the title, Liston relocated to Denver permanently, saying, "I'd rather be a lamppost in Denver than the mayor of Philadelphia."

==== Liston vs. Patterson II ====
Patterson and Liston had a rematch clause in their contract. Patterson wanted a chance to redeem himself, so they met again on July 22, 1963, in Las Vegas. It was the first million-dollar purse with both fighters receiving $1,434,000 each. Patterson, a 4:1 betting underdog, was knocked down three times and counted out at 2:10 of the first round. The fight lasted four seconds longer than the first one. Liston's victory was loudly booed. "The public is not with me. I know it", Liston said afterward. "But they'll have to swing along until somebody comes to beat me."

=== Liston vs. Clay ===
Liston made his second title defense on February 25, 1964, in Miami Beach, Florida against Cassius Clay (Muhammad Ali). Liston was a heavy favorite. In a pre-fight poll, 43 of 46 sportswriters picked Liston to win by knockout. Odds makers gave Liston 8:1 to win. Clay countered in verse, "If you want to lose your money, then bet on Sonny!" Liston was supremely confident of easily beating Clay, trained minimally for the fight and went ahead with it despite an injury to his left shoulder.

From the opening bell Liston attempted to close with Clay, looking to land a hard punch to the head to end the fight quickly and decisively. Although Clay often carried his gloves down at his waist, seemingly open to attack, he proved very difficult to hit. With Clay quickly ducking his head left, right or away, Liston's leading left jabs largely failed to land. As Liston pursued his target Clay retreated, using his foot speed to slip away into open space in the ring, largely circling to the left and away from the threat of a Liston left hook. Although the opening round saw Clay largely on the defensive, it was soon established that Clay could reverse roles quickly and take to the offensive with a remarkably fast series of combinations delivered to Liston's head. A sudden violent combination delivered with 30 seconds left in the round electrified the crowd. The opening round was fought an extra eight seconds, since both fighters and referee Barney Felix apparently did not hear the bell.

The second round saw Liston continue to pursue Clay. At one point, Liston had Clay against the ropes and landed a hard left hook. Clay confessed later he had been hurt by the punch, but Liston was unable to press his advantage home. Two of the three official scorers, or judges, awarded the round to Liston, and the other scored the round even.

In the third round, Clay began to take control of the fight. At about 30 seconds into the round he hit Liston with several combinations, causing a bruise under Liston's right eye and a cut under his left, which eventually required eight stitches to close. It was the first time in his career that Liston had been cut. At one point in this attack, Liston was rocked as he was driven to the ropes. A clearly angered Liston rallied at the end of the round when Clay seemed tired, delivering punishing body shots. It was probably Liston's best moment in the entire fight. Sitting on his stool between rounds, however, Liston was breathing heavily as his cornermen worked on his cut.

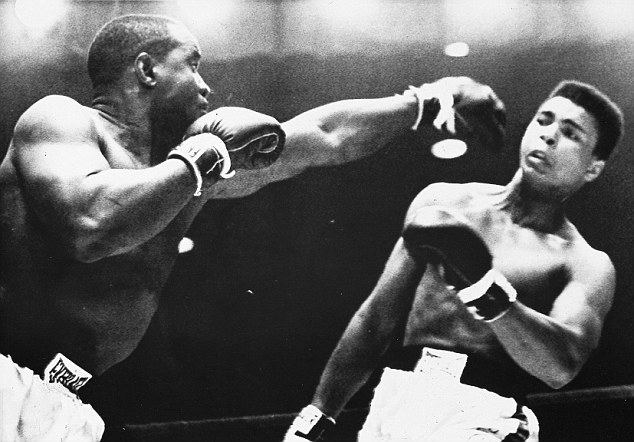
Ali dodging a punch from Liston

During the fourth round Liston appeared dominant as Clay coasted, keeping his distance. Joe Louis commenting on TV at ringside said "It's looking good for Sonny Liston". However, when Clay returned to his corner, he started complaining that there was something burning in his eyes and he could not see. "I didn't know what the heck was going on", Angelo Dundee, Clay's trainer, recalled on an NBC special 25 years later. "He said, 'Cut the gloves off. I want to prove to the world there's dirty work afoot.' And I said, 'Whoa, whoa, back up, baby. C'mon now, this is for the title, this is the big apple. What are you doing? Sit down!' So I get him down, I get the sponge and I pour the water into his eyes trying to cleanse whatever's there, but before I did that I put my pinkie in his eye and I put it into my eye. It burned like hell. There was something caustic in both eyes." Biographer Wilfrid Sheed wrote in his book, Muhammad Ali: A Portrait in Words and Photographs, that Clay's protests were heard by ringside members of the Nation of Islam who initially suspected Dundee had blinded his fighter, and that the trainer deliberately wiped his own eyes with the corner sponge to demonstrate to Clay's approaching bodyguards that he had not intentionally blinded him.

The commotion was not lost on referee Barney Felix, who was walking toward Clay's corner. Felix later said Clay was seconds from being disqualified. The challenger, his arms held high in surrender, was demanding that the fight be stopped and Dundee, fearing the fight might indeed be halted, gave his charge a one-word order: "Run!"

It was later theorized that a substance used on Liston's cuts by Joe Pollino, his cut man, may have caused the irritation.

Clay later said that in round five he could only see a faint shadow of Liston during most of the round, but by circling and moving frantically he managed to avoid Liston and somehow survive. At one point, Clay was wiping his eyes with his right hand while extending his left arm—"like a drunk leaning on a lamppost" Bert Sugar wrote—to keep Liston at bay. But by the sixth round his sight had cleared, and a clearly enraged Clay fought a blisteringly aggressive round landing numerous combination punches.

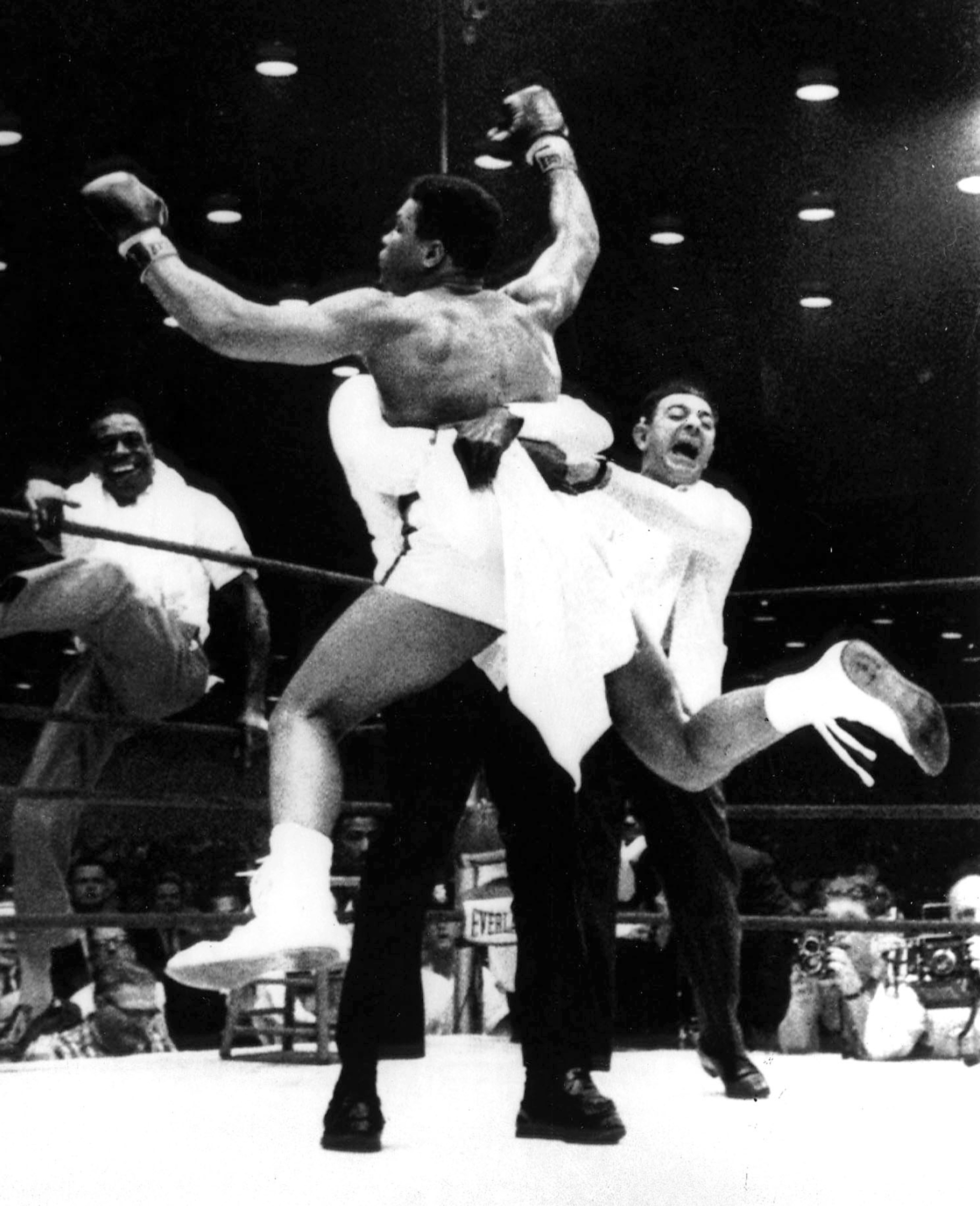
Ali lifted up by his team after being declared the victor

Liston failed to answer the bell for the seventh round, and Clay was declared the winner by technical knockout. At that point, the fight was scored as even on the official scorecards. It was the first time since 1919—when Jack Dempsey defeated Jess Willard—that a world heavyweight champion had quit on his stool. Liston said he quit because of a shoulder injury. Dr. Alexander Robbins, chief physician for the Miami Beach Boxing Commission, diagnosed Liston with a torn tendon in his left shoulder. However, David Remnick, for his book King of the World: Muhammad Ali and the Rise of an American Hero, interviewed one of Liston's cornermen, who told him that Liston could have continued: "[The shoulder] was all BS. We had a return bout clause with Clay, but if you say your guy just quit, who is gonna get a return bout? We cooked up that shoulder thing on the spot." Hall of Fame matchmaker Teddy Brenner also disputed the shoulder injury, claiming he saw Liston use the same arm to throw a chair in his dressing room after the match.

There is ample evidence that Liston did carry an injury to his left shoulder into the fight. Sports Illustrated writer Tex Maule wrote that Liston's shoulder injury was legitimate. He cited Liston's inability to lift his arm: "There is no doubt that Liston's arm was damaged. In the sixth round, he carried it at belt level so that it was of no help in warding off the right crosses with which Clay probed at the cut under his left eye." He also cited medical evidence: "A team of eight doctors inspected Liston's arm at St. Francis Hospital in Miami Beach and agreed that it was too badly damaged for Liston to continue fighting. The torn tendon had bled down into the mass of the biceps, swelling and numbing the arm." Those findings were confirmed in a formal investigation immediately after the fight by Florida State Attorney Richard Gerstein, who also noted that there was little doubt that Liston went into the fight with a sore or lame shoulder. Despite Liston carrying an injury and being undertrained, Ali stated in 1975 that the first fight with Liston was the toughest of his career.

=== Ali vs. Liston II ===
Liston trained hard for the rematch, which was scheduled to take place November 13, 1964, in Boston. Time magazine said Liston had worked himself into the best shape of his career. However, there were again rumors of alcohol abuse in training. The extent to which Liston's heavy drinking and possible drug use may have contributed to his surprisingly poor performances against Ali is not known.

Three days before the fight, Ali needed emergency surgery for a strangulated hernia. The bout would need to be delayed by six months. The new date was set for May 25, 1965. But as it approached, there were fears that the promoters were tied to organized crime and Massachusetts officials, most notably Suffolk County District Attorney Garrett H. Byrne, began to have second thoughts. Byrne sought an injunction blocking the fight in Boston because Inter-Continental Promotions was promoting the fight without a Massachusetts license. Inter-Continental said local veteran Sam Silverman was the promoter. On May 7, backers of the rematch ended the court battle by pulling the fight out of Boston. The promoters needed a new location quickly, whatever the size, to rescue their closed-circuit television commitment around the country. Governor John H. Reed of Maine stepped forward, and within a few hours the promoters had a new site: Lewiston, Maine, a mill town with a population of about 41,000 located 140 miles (230 km) north of Boston.

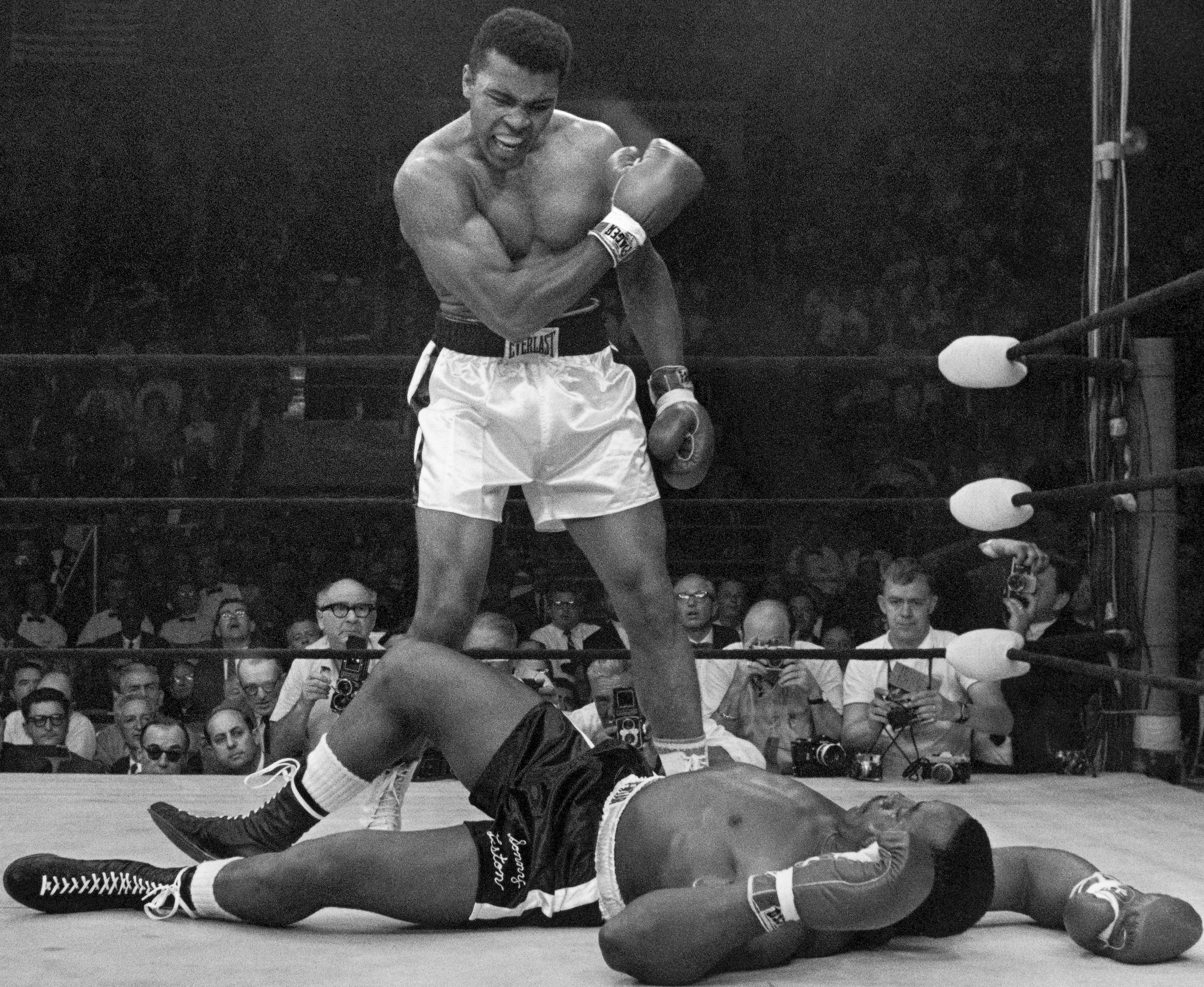
Muhammad Ali standing over Sonny Liston

The ending of the fight remains one of the most controversial in boxing history. Midway through the first round, Liston threw a left jab and Ali went over it with a fast right, knocking the former champion down. Liston went down on his back. He rolled over, got to his right knee and then fell on his back again. Many in attendance did not see Ali deliver the punch. The fight quickly descended into chaos. Referee Jersey Joe Walcott, a former world heavyweight champion, had a hard time getting Ali to go to a neutral corner. Ali initially stood over his fallen opponent, gesturing and yelling at him, "Get up and fight, sucker!" and "Nobody will believe this!"

When Walcott got back to Liston and looked at the knockdown timekeeper, Francis McDonough, to pick up the count, Liston had fallen back on the canvas. Walcott never did pick up the count. He said he could not hear McDonough, who did not have a microphone. Also, McDonough did not bang on the canvas or motion a number count with his fingers. McDonough, however, claimed Walcott was looking at the crowd and never at him. After Liston arose, Walcott wiped off his gloves. He then left the fighters to go over to McDonough. "The timekeeper was waving both hands and saying, 'I counted him out—the fight is over,'" Walcott said after the fight. "Nat Fleischer [editor of The Ring] was sitting beside McDonough and he was waving his hands, too, saying it was over." Walcott then rushed back to the fighters, who had resumed boxing, and stopped the fight—awarding Ali a first-round knockout victory. Strict interpretation of the knockdown/count rule states it is the referee's count and not the timekeeper's that is the official count. Furthermore, that count cannot be started until the fighter scoring the knockdown goes to and remains in a neutral corner. Ali did neither. Walcott never began a count in the ring because of Ali's non-compliance and his physical struggle with getting Ali to go to that neutral corner. The interference of ringside reporters regarding interpretation of the rules, the fight stoppage and the controversy after the fight had not been seen since The Long Count Fight between champion Gene Tunney and challenger Jack Dempsey in 1927.

The fight ranks as one of the shortest heavyweight title bouts in history. Many in the small crowd had not even settled in their seats when the fight was stopped. The official time of the stoppage was announced as 1:00 into the first round, which was wrong. Liston went down at 1:44, got up at 1:56, and Walcott stopped the fight at 2:12.

Numerous fans booed and started yelling, "Fix!" Many did not see the punch land, and some who did questioned that it was powerful enough to knock Liston out. Skeptics called the knockout blow "the phantom punch." Ali called it "the anchor punch." He said it was taught to him by comedian and film actor Stepin Fetchit, who learned it from Jack Johnson.

There were some, however, who believed the fight was legitimate. World light-heavyweight champion José Torres said, "It was a perfect punch." Jim Murray of the Los Angeles Times wrote that it was "no phantom punch." And Tex Maule of Sports Illustrated wrote, "The blow had so much force it lifted Liston's left foot, upon which most of his weight was resting, well off the canvas."

Still, some found it hard to believe that the punch could have floored a man like Liston. Hall of Fame announcer Don Dunphy said, "Here was a guy who was in prison and the guards used to beat him over the head with clubs and couldn't knock him down." But others contend he just was not the same Liston. Dave Anderson of The New York Times said Liston "looked awful" in his last workout before the fight. Arthur Daley of The New York Times wrote that Liston's handlers knew he "didn't have it anymore," and allegedly they had secretly paid sparring partner Amos Lincoln an extra $100 to take it easy on him – the same man, incidentally, that Liston dismissed in less than two rounds a full three years later.

Contender George Chuvalo declared that he considered the fight to be a fake. Some felt the knockdown was real but the knockout was fake. Ali biographer Wilfrid Sheed wrote, in his Muhammad Ali: A Portrait in Words and Photographs, that Liston planned to throw the fight for reasons unknown and used the legitimate first-round knockdown for that end. Sheed says that the punch and the knockdown "may have been genuine, but when referee Joe Walcott blew the count and gave him all evening to get up, Liston's rendition of a coma wouldn't have fooled a possum."

Ali clearly did not think he knocked Liston out. In his own words in Thomas Hauser's 1991 biography: "The punch jarred him. It was a good punch, but I didn't think I hit him so hard that he couldn't have gotten up. Once he went down, I got excited. I forgot about the rules." In that same book Liston was quoted two years after the fight: "Ali knocked me down with a sharp punch. I was down but not hurt, but I looked up and saw Ali standing over me. … Ali is waiting to hit me, the ref can't control him."

While Liston publicly denied taking a dive, Sports Illustrated writer Mark Kram said that years later Liston told him, "That guy [Ali] was crazy. I didn't want anything to do with him. And the Muslims were coming up. Who needed that? So I went down. I wasn't hit." The fact that Liston did not complain about the clear breach of boxing rules (being declared knocked out without a count) and Ali's obvious state of bewilderment, shouting at Liston "Nobody will believe this" and asking his handlers "Did I hit him?", confirmed most people's belief that Liston had taken a dive. There have been a number of unproven theories as to the background to the purported dive including that Liston was threatened by associates of Ali, or agreed to lose in return for a share in the more marketable Ali's future purses. Credence to the latter theory is provided by the fact that Liston, immediately after his fight with Chuck Wepner, seemed more concerned about supporting the proposed Ali-Frazier bout and Ali's claims to be champion than promoting his own career.

=== Subsequent fights ===
"I was an 'intimidator' until I fought Sonny Liston. Sonny Liston, I think was possibly the greatest intimidator of all time."

— Chuck Wepner on Liston's intimidating appearance

After the second loss to Ali, Liston stayed out of the ring for more than a year. He returned with four consecutive knockout victories in Sweden between July 1966 and April 1967, all four co-promoted by former world heavyweight champion Ingemar Johansson. One of the victories was over Amos Johnson, Liston's former sparring partner, who had recently defeated British champion Henry Cooper. He was denied entry to the 1967 WBA tournament to find a successor to Ali who had been stripped of his title following his refusal to be drafted into the US military during the Vietnam war.

Liston returned to the United States and won seven fights, all by knockout, in 1968, increasing his string to eleven. America's first look at Liston since the Ali rematch was when he fought fifth–ranked Henry Clark in a nationally broadcast bout in July 1968. He won by a seventh-round technical knockout, and seemed on the verge of making a comeback to the big time. He talked of a fight with Joe Frazier, claiming, "It'd be like shooting fish in a barrel." Liston won 14 consecutive bouts, 13 by knockout, before fighting third-ranked Leotis Martin, previously beaten by Clark, in December 1969. Liston decked Martin with a left hook in the fourth round and dominated most of the fight, but Martin came back and knocked Liston out cold in the ninth round. Unfortunately for Martin, however, his career ended after that fight due to a detached retina he suffered during the bout.

Liston won his final fight, a tough but one-sided match against future world title challenger Chuck Wepner in June 1970. The bout was stopped after the ninth round due to cuts over both of Wepner's eyes. Wepner needed 72 stitches and suffered a broken cheekbone and nose. Wepner, who also fought George Foreman and Muhammad Ali, said after his career was over that Liston was the hardest puncher he faced.

== Boxing style ==
Writer Gilbert Rogin assessed Liston's style and physique after his win over Zora Folley. He said that Liston was not quick with his hand or footwork, that he relied too much on his ability to take a punch, and that he could be vulnerable to an opponent with more hand speed. "But can he hit!" Rogin wrote. "There is power in both his left and his right, even though the fists move with the languor of motoring royalty or as if passing through a gaseous envelope more dense than air." Rogin called Liston's physique "awesome—arms like fence posts, thighs like silos." His defense was described as "the gate-crossing of arms à la Archie Moore."

Future world heavyweight champion George Foreman, who sparred with Liston after Foreman's amateur career, assessed Liston's jab as the most formidable he faced and Liston as the strongest man he encountered in the ring, describing Liston as having the most natural talent and skill. Foreman stated: "There wasn't anything missing from Sonny Liston. He had the whole package." While much has been written about the effectiveness of his left jab, others have commented favorably on Liston's wide range of boxing skills. These include Muhammad Ali, who stated in a 1975 interview that he was a great admirer of Liston's talents: "Liston had a tremendous jab, could punch with either hand, was smart in the ring and as strong as any heavyweight I've ever seen." Ali also stated in his autobiography that in his prime the only two heavyweights who would have caused him serious trouble were "Ezzard Charles and a young Sonny Liston". Boxing trainer and manager Johnny Tocco, who worked with George Foreman and Mike Tyson as well as Liston, stated that "Sonny hit harder than anyone I ever saw. Yes, harder than Tyson, (Earnie) Shavers . . . anyone. When Sonny got you, you were outta there."

Liston is ranked second in the ESPN.com list of "The Hardest Hitters in Heavyweight History.". Herb Goldman stated that Liston, when in his prime between 1958 and 1963, was the most feared fighter in boxing history.

== Personal life ==
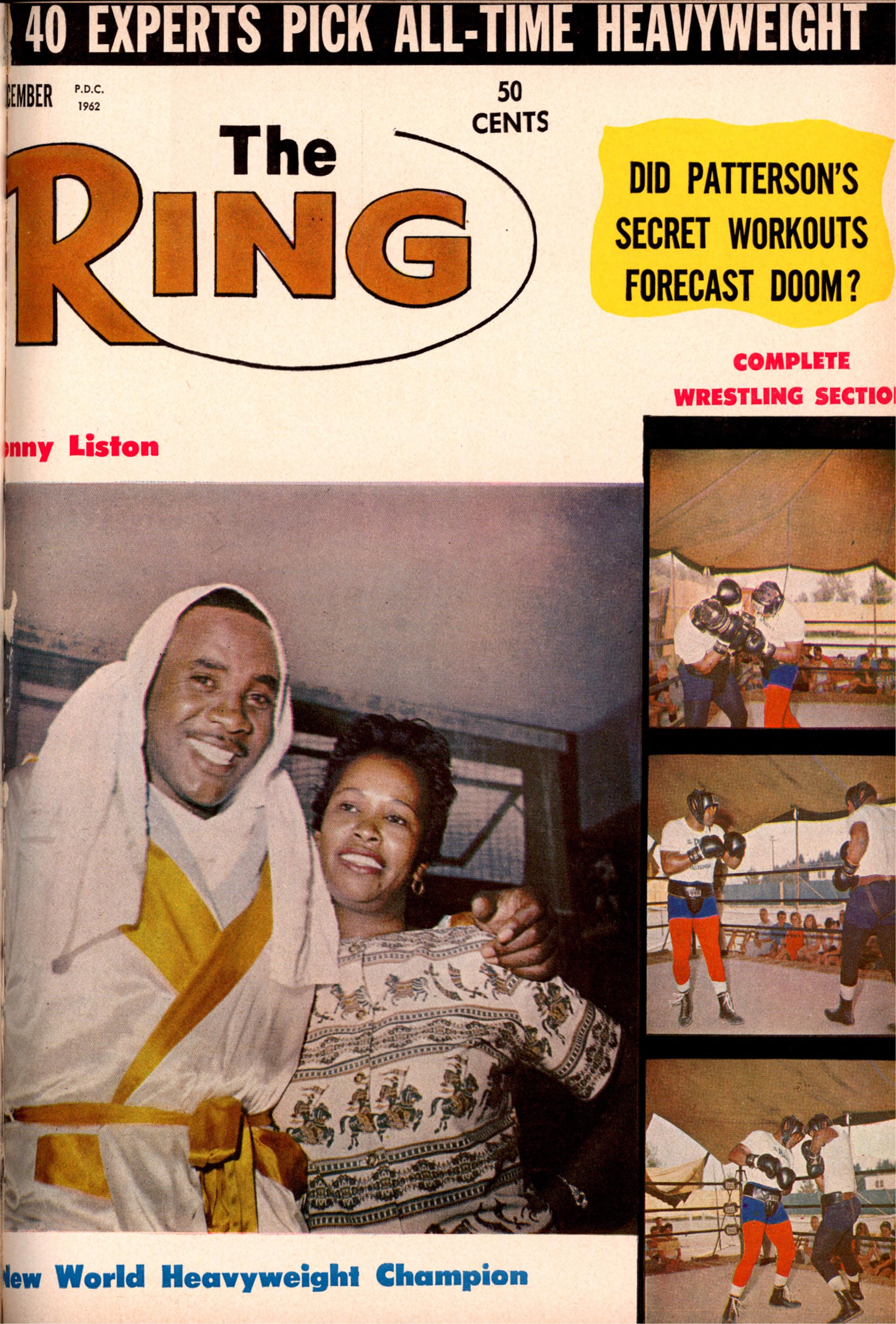
Liston and his wife Geraldine on the cover of the December 1962 issue of The Ring

Liston married Geraldine Chambers in St. Louis, Missouri, on September 3, 1957. Geraldine had a daughter from a previous marriage, and the Listons subsequently adopted a boy from Sweden. Geraldine remembered her husband as "Great with me, great with the kids. He was a gentle man." Although largely illiterate through lack of schooling, though not innumerate, Liston was a more complex and interesting individual than has often been acknowledged. Former light-heavyweight champion José Torres said, "I have never met an athlete in baseball, basketball or football who is smarter, more intelligent than Sonny Liston".

== Death ==
Liston was found dead by his wife, Geraldine, in their Las Vegas home on January 5, 1971. On returning home from a two-week trip Geraldine smelled a foul odor emanating from the main bedroom. Upon entering the room, she saw him slumped up against the bed, with a broken foot bench on the floor.

Following an investigation, Las Vegas police concluded there were no signs of foul play and declared Liston's death a heroin overdose. "It was common knowledge that Sonny was a heroin addict," said Sgt. Caputo, one of the investigating police officers, "The whole department knew about it." The date of death listed on his death certificate is December 30, 1970, which police estimated by judging the number of milk bottles and newspapers around the front door of the property. Coroner Mark Herman said traces of heroin byproducts were found in Liston's system, but not in amounts large enough to have caused his death. Also, scar tissue, possibly from needle marks, was found in the bend of Liston's left elbow. The toxicology report said his body was too decomposed for the tests to be conclusive. Officially, Liston died of lung congestion and heart failure. He had been suffering from hardening of the heart muscle and lung disease before his death. Liston had been hospitalized in early December, complaining of chest pains.

Liston was buried at Paradise Memorial Gardens in Las Vegas, Nevada. The grave's marker-plate bears the dedication: "A Man."

=== Theories regarding death circumstances ===
Sgt. Dennis Caputo of the Clark County Sheriff's Department was one of the first officers on the scene. He found a quarter-ounce of heroin in a balloon in the kitchen, and a half-ounce of marijuana in Liston's pants pocket, but no syringes or needles. Some found it suspicious that authorities could not locate any drug paraphernalia that Liston presumably would have needed to inject the fatal dose, such as a spoon to cook the heroin or a tourniquet to wrap around his arm. However, according to former Las Vegas police Sergeant Gary Beckwith, "It wasn't uncommon for family members in these cases to go through and tidy up ... to save family embarrassment."

Many people who knew Liston insisted he was afraid of needles and never would have used heroin. "He had a deadly fear of needles," said Davey Pearl, a boxing referee and friend of Liston's. "There was nothing Sonny feared more than a needle. I know!" said Liston's Philadelphia dentist, Dr. Nick Ragni. "He was afraid of needles," echoed Father Edward Murphy. "He would do everything to avoid taking shots." According to Liston's trainer, Willie Reddish, Liston cancelled a planned tour to Africa in 1963 because he refused to get the required inoculations. Liston's wife also recalled that her husband would refuse basic medical care for common colds because of his dislike of needles.

"The month before he died, some guy ran into Sonny while he was making a left turn. He had a whiplash, so they took him to the hospital," said boxing trainer Johnny Tocco. "He said: 'Look what they did!' and he was pointing at some little bandage over the needle mark in his arm. He was more angry about that shot than he was about the car wreck. A couple weeks later, he was still complainin' about that needle mark. To this day, I'm convinced that's what the coroner saw in his exam—that hospital needle mark."

However, some individuals have claimed that Liston was murdered. There are several theories as to why. Publicist Harold Conrad and others believed that Liston had been deeply involved as a bill collector for a loansharking ring in Las Vegas. When he allegedly tried to claim a bigger share, Conrad theorizes that his employers got him very drunk, took him home and injected him with an overdose. Professional gambler Lem Banker insists that Liston was murdered by drug dealers with whom he had become involved. Banker said he was told by police that Liston had been seen at a house that would be the target of a drug raid. Banker stated that "Sheriff [Ralph] Lamb told me, 'Tell your pal Sonny to stay away from the West Side because we're going to bust the drug dealers.'" Banker later learned that the police told Liston the same thing to his face. Liston was allegedly present at dealer Earl Cage's residence during a raid by narcotics detectives. Because of that, Cage may have thought Sonny was an informant and injected him with a "hot dose" as retribution. Another theory is that the mob promised Liston some money to throw the second Ali fight, but they never paid him. As the years passed and Liston's financial situation worsened, he got angry and told the mob he would go public with the story unless they gave him the money, leading to his murder. Yet another version is that Liston was supposed to take a dive when he fought Chuck Wepner six months earlier, and killing him was payback for his failure to do so.

On January 1, Liston's wife, Geraldine, called Johnny Tocco and said she had not heard from her husband in three days and was worried. A few years before Tocco died, he allegedly told one of his good friends, Tony Davi, that he went to Liston's house and found the door locked and his car in the driveway. Tocco called the police, and they broke into the house. Tocco said that the living room furniture was in disarray, but the house did not yet smell of death. He said they found Liston lying on his bed with a needle sticking out of his arm. Tocco left the house before the police did. "Johnny wasn't a braggart," Davi told Liston biographer Paul Gallender. "He told me in the strictest confidence, but it was like he wanted to get it off his chest." Gallender claimed, "A lot of officers knew Sonny was dead before Geraldine returned home on January 5, but they chose to let him rot."

== Tributes ==
Although Liston received little support from the boxing establishment and press during his lifetime, his reputation as a boxer has grown considerably in the decades following his death. A bronze copy of a marble statue of Liston sculpted by Alfred Hrdlicka in 1964 was erected in 2008 between Old Castle and Karlsplatz in Stuttgart, Germany. A successful racehorse which won the Irish St Leger classic race in 2021 was named Sonnyboyliston. Another unconnected and unrelated horse named Sonny Liston finished 2nd in the Royal Hunt Cup at Royal Ascot in 2023 and 2024.

== Life outside boxing ==
=== Acting ===
Liston played a fist fighter in the 1965 film Harlow, made a cameo appearance in the 1968 film Head, which starred The Monkees, and played the part of The Farmer in the 1970 film Moonfire, which starred Richard Egan and Charles Napier. Also in 1970, Liston appeared on an episode of the TV series Love, American Style and in a television commercial for Braniff Airlines with Andy Warhol.

=== Portrayal in film ===
In The Greatest, the 1977 film about the life of boxer Muhammad Ali in which Ali played himself, Liston was portrayed by Roger E. Mosley.

Liston was the subject of a 1995 HBO documentary titled Sonny Liston: The Mysterious Life and Death of a Champion.

In the 2001 film Ali, Liston was portrayed by former WBO Heavyweight Champion Michael Bentt.

Liston was the subject of a 2008 feature film based upon his life titled Phantom Punch. The film starred Ving Rhames as Liston and was produced by Rhames, Hassain Zaidi and Marek Posival.

In the 2015 British crime film Legend, Liston is played by Mark Theodore in a scene where gangster Reggie Kray poses for a picture with the boxer.

In the 2020 film One Night in Miami..., Liston is played by Aaron D. Alexander.

Liston served as the archetype for the character of Clubber Lang in the film Rocky III, written and directed by Sylvester Stallone.

In the 2026 sports television series The Greatest about the life of Muhammad Ali, Liston was played by Amin Joseph.

=== Portrayal in fiction ===
Liston appears as a character in James Ellroy's novel The Cold Six Thousand. In the novel, Liston not only drinks but also pops pills and works as a sometime enforcer for a heroin ring in Las Vegas. Liston also appears in the sequel, Blood's a Rover.

Thom Jones titled his 2000 collection of short stories Sonny Liston Was a Friend of Mine.

Sonny Liston was featured in a novel "Girl Fighter" with a brief reference to his early life, his rise to WBC heavyweight champion and his eventual losses to Clay/Ali.

=== Music ===
Liston has been referenced in many songs by artists such as Curtis Eller, Sun Kil Moon, the Animals, Tom Petty, Mark Knopfler, Phil Ochs, Morrissey, Freddy Blohm, Chuck E. Weiss, This Bike is a Pipe Bomb, the Roots, Wu-Tang Clan, Gone Jackals, Billy Joel, the Mountain Goats, Lil Wayne, Nick Cave and the Bad Seeds, and the Killers. Mark Knopfler's tribute to Liston, "Song for Sonny Liston", appeared on his 2004 album Shangri-La.

A wax model of Liston appears in the front row of the iconic sleeve cover of the Beatles' Sgt. Pepper's Lonely Hearts Club Band. He is seen in the far left part of the row, wearing a white and gold robe, standing beside the original-look Beatle wax figures.

Singer/songwriter Rod Picott wrote and recorded a song titled "Sonny Liston" for his 2022 album "Paper Hearts and Broken Arrows."

=== Print ===
Liston appeared on the December 1963 cover of Esquire magazine (cover photograph by Carl Fischer) "the last man on earth America wanted to see coming down its chimney".

Elizabeth Bear wrote the short story "Sonny Liston Takes the Fall", published in The Del Rey Book of Science Fiction and Fantasy in 2008. The story speculates that Liston threw the Ali match for the good of society.

Shaun Assael wrote "The Murder of Sonny Liston: Las Vegas, Heroin, and Heavyweights", published in 2016. The book suggests that Sonny Liston may have been murdered and a possibility that the crime was never investigated. In The Devil and Sonny Liston by Nick Tosches, published in 2000, when many of Liston's former acquaintances were still alive, Tosches posits that Liston's idol Joe Louis introduced him to heroin, and that he ultimately overdosed.

=== Activism ===
On July 28, 1963, Liston joined a group of 500 African Americans in Denver who marched to a post office to mail letters urging the Colorado congressional delegation to pass the Kennedy administration's civil rights package.

== Professional boxing record ==
| 54 fights | 50 wins | 4 losses |
|---|---|---|
| By knockout | 39 | 3 |
| By decision | 11 | 1 |

| No. | Result | Record | Opponent | Type | Round, time | Date | Location | Notes |
|---|---|---|---|---|---|---|---|---|
| 54 | Win | 50–4 | Chuck Wepner | TKO | 9 (10), 3:00 | Jun 29, 1970 | National Guard Armory, Jersey City, New Jersey, U.S. | |
| 53 | Loss | 49–4 | Leotis Martin | KO | 9 (12), 1:08 | Dec 6, 1969 | Las Vegas Hilton, Winchester, Nevada, U.S. | For vacant NABF heavyweight title |
| 52 | Win | 49–3 | Sonny Moore | KO | 3 (10) | Sep 23, 1969 | Coliseum, Houston, Texas, U.S. | |
| 51 | Win | 48–3 | George Johnson | TKO | 7 (10), 2:55 | May 19, 1969 | Convention Center, Winchester, Nevada, U.S. | |
| 50 | Win | 47–3 | Billy Joiner | UD | 10 | Mar 28, 1969 | Kiel Auditorium, St. Louis, Missouri, U.S. | |
| 49 | Win | 46–3 | Amos Lincoln | KO | 2 (10), 2:46 | Dec 10, 1968 | Civic Center, Baltimore, Maryland, U.S. | |
| 48 | Win | 45–3 | Roger Rischer | KO | 3 (10), 2:23 | Nov 12, 1968 | Civic Arena, Pittsburgh, Pennsylvania, U.S. | |
| 47 | Win | 44–3 | Willis Earls | KO | 2 (10), 1:52 | Nov 3, 1968 | Plaza de Toros, Ciudad Juárez, Mexico | |
| 46 | Win | 43–3 | Sonny Moore | TKO | 3 (10) | Oct 14, 1968 | Veterans Memorial Coliseum, Phoenix, Arizona, U.S. | |
| 45 | Win | 42–3 | Henry Clark | TKO | 7 (10), 2:47 | Jul 6, 1968 | Cow Palace, Daly City, California, U.S. | |
| 44 | Win | 41–3 | Billy Joiner | RTD | 7 (10), 3:00 | May 23, 1968 | Grand Olympic Auditorium, Los Angeles, California, U.S. | |
| 43 | Win | 40–3 | Bill McMurray | TKO | 4 (10), 0:47 | Mar 16, 1968 | Centennial Coliseum, Reno, Nevada, U.S. | |
| 42 | Win | 39–3 | Elmer Rush | TKO | 6 (10) | Apr 28, 1967 | Stockholm, Sweden | |
| 41 | Win | 38–3 | Dave Bailey | KO | 1 (10), 2:22 | Mar 30, 1967 | Mässhallen, Gothenburg, Sweden | |
| 40 | Win | 37–3 | Amos Johnson | KO | 3 (10), 1:48 | Aug 19, 1966 | Nya Ullevi, Gothenburg, Sweden | |
| 39 | Win | 36–3 | Gerhard Zech | KO | 7 (10), 1:11 | Jul 1, 1966 | Stockholm, Sweden | |
| 38 | Loss | 35–3 | Muhammad Ali | KO | 1 (15), 2:12 | May 25, 1965 | St. Dominic's Hall, Lewiston, Maine, U.S. | For WBC, NYSAC, and The Ring heavyweight titles |
| 37 | Loss | 35–2 | Cassius Clay | RTD | 6 (15), 3:00 | Feb 25, 1964 | Convention Center, Miami Beach, Florida, U.S. | Lost WBA, WBC, NYSAC, and The Ring heavyweight titles |
| 36 | Win | 35–1 | Floyd Patterson | KO | 1 (15), 2:10 | July 22, 1963 | Las Vegas Convention Center, Winchester, Nevada, U.S. | Retained WBA, NYSAC, and The Ring heavyweight titles; Won inaugural WBC heavyweight title |
| 35 | Win | 34–1 | Floyd Patterson | KO | 1 (15), 2:06 | Sep 25, 1962 | Comiskey Park, Chicago, Illinois, U.S. | Won WBA, NYSAC, and The Ring heavyweight titles |
| 34 | Win | 33–1 | Albert Westphal | KO | 1 (10), 1:58 | Dec 4, 1961 | Convention Hall, Philadelphia, Pennsylvania, U.S. | |
| 33 | Win | 32–1 | Howard King | TKO | 3 (10), 0:53 | Mar 8, 1961 | Municipal Auditorium, Miami Beach, Florida, U.S. | |
| 32 | Win | 31–1 | Eddie Machen | UD | 12 | Sep 7, 1960 | Sick's Stadium, Seattle, Washington, U.S. | |
| 31 | Win | 30–1 | Zora Folley | KO | 3 (12), 0:28 | Jul 18, 1960 | Coliseum, Denver, Colorado, U.S. | |
| 30 | Win | 29–1 | Roy Harris | TKO | 1 (10), 2:35 | Apr 25, 1960 | Coliseum, Houston, Texas, U.S. | |
| 29 | Win | 28–1 | Cleveland Williams | TKO | 2 (10), 2:13 | Mar 21, 1960 | Coliseum, Houston, Texas, U.S. | |
| 28 | Win | 27–1 | Howard King | RTD | 7 (10), 3:00 | Feb 23, 1960 | Municipal Auditorium, Miami Beach, Florida, U.S. | |
| 27 | Win | 26–1 | Willi Besmanoff | RTD | 6 (10), 3:00 | Dec 9, 1959 | Cleveland Arena, Cleveland, Ohio, U.S. | |
| 26 | Win | 25–1 | Niño Valdés | KO | 3 (10), 0:47 | Aug 5, 1959 | Chicago Stadium, Chicago, Illinois, U.S. | |
| 25 | Win | 24–1 | Cleveland Williams | TKO | 3 (10), 2:13 | Apr 15, 1959 | Municipal Auditorium, Miami Beach, Florida, U.S. | |
| 24 | Win | 23–1 | Mike DeJohn | TKO | 6 (10), 2:43 | Feb 18, 1959 | Exhibition Hall, Miami Beach, Florida, U.S. | |
| 23 | Win | 22–1 | Ernie Cab | RTD | 7 (10), 3:00 | Nov 18, 1958 | Municipal Auditorium, Miami Beach, Florida, U.S. | |
| 22 | Win | 21–1 | Bert Whitehurst | UD | 10 | Oct 24, 1958 | St. Louis Arena, St. Louis, Missouri, U.S. | |
| 21 | Win | 20–1 | Frankie Daniels | KO | 1 (10), 2:22 | Oct 7, 1958 | Municipal Auditorium, Miami Beach, Florida, U.S. | |
| 20 | Win | 19–1 | Wayne Bethea | TKO | 1 (10), 1:09 | Aug 6, 1958 | Chicago Stadium, Chicago, Illinois, U.S. | |
| 19 | Win | 18–1 | Julio Mederos | RTD | 2 (10) | May 14, 1958 | Chicago Stadium, Chicago, Illinois, U.S. | |
| 18 | Win | 17–1 | Bert Whitehurst | PTS | 10 | Apr 3, 1958 | Kiel Auditorium, St. Louis, Missouri, U.S. | |
| 17 | Win | 16–1 | Ben Wise | TKO | 4 (8) | Mar 11, 1958 | Midwest Gymnasium, Chicago, Illinois, U.S. | |
| 16 | Win | 15–1 | Billy Hunter | TKO | 2 (6) | Jan 29, 1958 | Chicago Stadium, Chicago, Illinois, U.S. | |
| 15 | Win | 14–1 | Marty Marshall | UD | 10 | Mar 6, 1956 | Pittsburgh Gardens, Pittsburgh, Pennsylvania, U.S. | |
| 14 | Win | 13–1 | Larry Watson | TKO | 4 (10) | Dec 13, 1955 | Alnad Shriner Temple, East St. Louis, Illinois, U.S. | |
| 13 | Win | 12–1 | Johnny Gray | TKO | 6 (10) | Sep 13, 1955 | Victory Field, Indianapolis, Indiana, U.S. | |
| 12 | Win | 11–1 | Calvin Butler | TKO | 2 (8), 2:18 | May 25, 1955 | St. Louis Arena, St. Louis, Missouri, U.S. | |
| 11 | Win | 10–1 | Emil Brtko | TKO | 5 (10), 2:55 | May 5, 1955 | Duquesne Gardens, Pittsburgh, Pennsylvania, U.S. | |
| 10 | Win | 9–1 | Marty Marshall | TKO | 6 (8) | Apr 21, 1955 | Kiel Auditorium, St. Louis, Missouri, U.S. | |
| 9 | Win | 8–1 | Neal Welch | PTS | 8 | Mar 1, 1955 | New Masonic Temple, St. Louis, Missouri, U.S. | |
| 8 | Loss | 7–1 | Marty Marshall | SD | 8 | Sep 7, 1954 | Motor City Arena, Detroit, Michigan, U.S. | |
| 7 | Win | 7–0 | Johnny Summerlin | SD | 8 | Aug 10, 1954 | Motor City Arena, Detroit, Michigan, U.S. | |
| 6 | Win | 6–0 | Johnny Summerlin | UD | 8 | Jun 29, 1954 | Motor City Arena, Detroit, Michigan, U.S. | |
| 5 | Win | 5–0 | Stanley Howlett | PTS | 6 | Mar 31, 1954 | St. Louis Arena, St. Louis, Missouri, U.S. | |
| 4 | Win | 4–0 | Martin Lee | TKO | 6 (6) | Jan 25, 1954 | New Masonic Temple, St. Louis, Missouri, U.S. | |
| 3 | Win | 3–0 | Bennie Thomas | SD | 6 | Nov 21, 1953 | Kiel Auditorium, St. Louis, Missouri, U.S. | |
| 2 | Win | 2–0 | Ponce de Leon | PTS | 4 | Sep 17, 1953 | Kiel Auditorium, St. Louis, Missouri, U.S. | |
| 1 | Win | 1–0 | Don Smith | TKO | 1 (4), 0:33 | Sep 2, 1953 | St. Louis Arena, St. Louis, Missouri, U.S. | |

== Titles in boxing ==
=== Major world titles ===
- NYSAC heavyweight champion (200+ lbs)
- WBA heavyweight champion (200+ lbs)
- WBC heavyweight champion (Note: Awarded inaugural title on July 22, 1963.) (200+ lbs)

=== The Ring magazine titles ===
- The Ring heavyweight champion (200+ lbs)

=== Undisputed titles ===
- Undisputed heavyweight champion

== See also ==
- List of heavyweight boxing champions
- List of undisputed boxing champions
- List of WBA world champions
- List of WBC world champions
- List of The Ring world champions
- Irving Resnick – Liston's manager

== Notes ==
Sporting positions
Amateur boxing titles
| Previous: Ed Sanders | U.S. Golden Gloves heavyweight champion 1953 | Next: Garvin Sawyer |
World boxing titles
| Preceded by Floyd Patterson | NYSAC heavyweight champion September 25, 1962 – February 25, 1964 | Succeeded by Cassius Clay (renamed Muhammad Ali a few days later) |
| Preceded by Floyd Patterson | WBA heavyweight champion September 25, 1962 – February 25, 1964 | Succeeded by Cassius Clay (renamed Muhammad Ali a few days later) |
| Preceded by Floyd Patterson | The Ring heavyweight champion September 25, 1962 – February 25, 1964 | Succeeded by Cassius Clay (renamed Muhammad Ali a few days later) |
| Preceded by Floyd Patterson | Undisputed heavyweight champion September 25, 1962 – February 25, 1964 | Succeeded by Cassius Clay (renamed Muhammad Ali a few days later) |
| Inaugural champion | WBC heavyweight champion July 22, 1963 – February 25, 1964 | Succeeded by Cassius Clay (renamed Muhammad Ali a few days later) |
