= Alan van Sprang =

Canadian actor

- Born: June 19, 1971 (age 55); Calgary, Alberta, Canada
- Occupation: Actor
- Years active: 1994–present

Alan van Sprang (born June 19, 1971) is a Canadian actor best known for playing Sir Francis Bryan in the series The Tudors, appearing in the Living Dead films of George A. Romero and for playing King Henry on The CW's original series Reign. He also portrayed Valentine Morgenstern on Freeform's hit show, Shadowhunters.

== Personal life ==
Van Sprang is the son of musician Van Louis, a former member of rock band The Stampeders. Van Sprang has a son named Logan.

== Filmography ==
=== Film ===
Year	Title	Role	Notes
1995	Dangerous Intentions	Marshall Cameron	
1995	Black Fox: Good Men and Bad	Longbaugh, Dunn Gang	TV movie
1996	Closer and Closer	Interviewer #2	TV movie
1996	Conundrum	Ted Baum	TV movie
1996	Carpool	Kirk, Bauer & Cole Salesman	
1997	Masterminds	Happy Boy #7	
2000	Steal This Movie	David Glenn	
2000	Best Actress	Billy Walsh	TV movie
2000	The Uncles	Alan Rossi	
2001	Stolen Miracle	Daryl Courmier	TV movie
2001	Earth Angels	Lucas	TV movie
2002	Narc	Michael Calvess	
2003	Do or Die	Tink	TV movie
2003	The Visual Bible: The Gospel of John	Judas Iscariot	
2003	Rush of Fear	John 'J.J.' Gillis	TV movie
2003	In the Dark	Lawrence Taylor	TV movie
2004	Evel Knievel	John Derek	TV movie
2004	Anonymous Rex	Raal	TV movie
2005	Confessions of an American Bride	Mitchell Stone (as Allan Van Sprang)	TV movie
2005	Land of the Dead	Brubaker	
2005	Devil's Perch	Jake	TV movie
2006	Saw III	Chris	
2007	Shutter	Lukas	Short
2007	Diary of the Dead	Sergeant 'Nicotine' Crockett	
2008	Phantom Punch	Nico Orso	
2009	Survival of the Dead	Sergeant 'Nicotine' Crockett	
2010	Pay In Full	Sergei	
2011	Immortals	Dareios	
2015	Pirate's Passage	Immigration Officer #1	Voice
2017	How to Fall	—N/a	Short; executive producer
2018	The Lie	Greg	
2020	Tainted	Lance	
2021	The Boathouse	Dominic Szabo	

=== Television ===
Year	Title	Role	Notes
1994	Robin's Hoods	Carl Rossi	Episode: "Bad Girl"
1997	Viper	Karl Warrick	Episode: "Triple Cross"
1998	Made in Canada	Jeremy Black	Episodes: "Second in Command", "The Mill Show"
1998	Highlander: The Raven	William Kenworthy	Episode: "Bloodlines"
1999	The City	N/A	Episode: "Where the Bodies are Buried"
1999	Power Play	Hamilton	Episode: "Family Values"
1999	La Femme Nikita	Carl Peruze	Episode: "Under the Influence"
1999	PSI Factor: Chronicles of the Paranormal	Griffin	Episode: "Temple of Light"
2000	Traders	N/A	Episode: "Scents and Sensibilities"
2000	D.C.	Dr. Ben	Episodes: "Trust", "Guns and Roses"
2000	Code Name: Eternity	Brady	Episode: "Thief"
2001	Drop the Beat	Cary	Episodes: "Doing Good with Evil", "Trippin"
2001–2002	Soul Food	Dr. Caldwell	3 episodes
2001–2002	Earth: Final Conflict	Howlyn	Main role (season 5); 22 episodes
2002	Mentors	Harry Houdini	Episode: "A Matter of Time: Part 2"
2002	Monk	Leonard Stokes	Episode: "Mr. Monk Goes to the Carnival"
2002	Adventure Inc.	Paul Ziglen	Episode: "Fatal Error"
2003	Veritas: The Quest	Javier	Episode: "Sangraal"
2003	Bliss	Mr. Leonides	Episode: "The Piano Tuner"
2003	Mutant X	Rae Larkin	Episode: "Inferno"
2003	Starhunter	Jimmi Zavras	Episode: "Rebirth"
2003, 2007	A Taste of Shakespeare	Macduff / Cassio	Episodes: "Macbeth", "Othello"
2004	Puppets Who Kill	Ted's Partner	Episode: "Dead Ted"
2004	The Newsroom	George's Replacement	Episode: "The British Accent"
2004	Metropia	Detective Dunlap	
2004	Paradise Falls	Johnny Brice	Recurring role (season 2); 16 episodes
2005	G-Spot	Alan	Episode: "Bronzed Vagina"
2005	Wild Card	Stevie	Episode: "See Ya Later, Investigator!"
2005	1-800-Missing	Will Sheperd	Episode: "Unnatural Disaster"
2005	Degrassi: The Next Generation	Leo Davies	Episode: "Together Forever"
2006	11 Cameras	Bruce	Main role
2006, 2008	ReGenesis	Jack Bowden	Episodes: "Escape Mutant", "The Cocktail", "The Sounds of Science"
2007	The Best Years	Lee Campbell	Recurring role; 11 episodes
2008	Would Be Kings	Gary Coyle	TV miniseries
2009	The Tudors	Francis Bryan	8 episodes (season 3)
2009	Guns	John Willison	TV miniseries
2009	Flashpoint	Donald Mitchell	Episode: "Custody"
2009–2010	Cra$h & Burn	Father Benedito	Recurring role; 7 episodes
2009–2010	Being Erica	Jody	3 episodes
2011	Rookie Blue	Patrick Murphy	Episode: "Might Have Been"
2011–2012	King	Derek Spears	21 episodes
2012	The L.A. Complex	Eric	Episodes: "Rules of Thirds", "Half Way", "Stay"
2013	CollegeHumor Originals	N/A	Episode: "Cat vs. Dog Fighting Game"
2013	The Listener	Shane Dent	Episode: "Caged In"
2013	Saving Hope	Thomas Ford	Episode: "Defriender"
2013–2015	Reign	Henry II of France	21 episodes (Season 1–2); 18 episodes in season 1 (recurring role); 3 episodes in season 2 (guest role)
2015	Beauty & the Beast	Bob Hall	2 episodes (season 3)
2016–2018	Shadowhunters	Valentine Morgenstern	Recurring role (seasons 1–2), 24 episodes Guest role (season 3), 1 episode
2019	Star Trek: Discovery	Captain Leland	8 episodes (season 2)
2023	Titans	Sheriff Dave Carter	2 episodes
2024	Doomlands	Nyman the Necromancer (voice)	Episode: "Please, My Jo-Jo"
2025	Law & Order Toronto: Criminal Intent	Superintendent Charles Bishop	Episode: "Hoggs Hollow"
2026	Doc	Xander Voit	Episode: "Good Hands"
2026	Hudson & Rex	Bob Ladron	2 episodes
