= The Tortured =

2010 Canadian film by Robert Lieberman

- Teaser poster
- Directed by: Robert Lieberman
- Written by: Marek Posival
- Produced by: Mark Burg; Oren Koules; Carl Mazzocone; Marek Posival
- Starring: Erika Christensen; Jesse Metcalfe; Fulvio Cecere; Bill Moseley
- Cinematography: Peter F. Woeste
- Edited by: Jim Page
- Music by: Jeff Rona
- Production companies: Twisted Pictures; LightTower Entertainment
- Distributed by: IFC Films
- Release dates: 28 August 2010 (Film4 FrightFest); 11 May 2012
- Running time: 79 minutes
- Countries: Canada; United States
- Language: English

The Tortured is a 2010 horror thriller film directed by Robert Lieberman, written by Marek Posival, and starring Erika Christensen, Jesse Metcalfe, Fulvio Cecere, and Bill Moseley.

== Plot ==
The film tells the story of a couple, Elise Landry (Erika Christensen) and her husband, Craig Landry (Jesse Metcalfe), whose lives are shattered when a serial killer named John Kozlowski (Bill Moseley), kidnaps, tortures, and kills their only son, Benjamin.

Craig feels immense guilt, as he saw Benjamin being kidnapped, but could not catch up to the fleeing vehicle. Elise blames Craig for not watching the child more closely. During the trial, Kozlowski makes a plea bargain, and in exchange for providing details on other murders, is sentenced to only 25 years to life. Elise and Craig are livid with the court's verdict. Elise asks Craig to get her a gun so that she can kill Kozlowski, but Craig refuses. Elise moves out of the house and Craig, left alone, contemplates suicide. Later, he meets Elise to say that just killing Kozlowski will not be enough, and the two formulate a plan to kidnap the killer.

Craig steals medical supplies and drugs from the hospital where he works. They follow Kozlowski when he is being transferred to prison via police van. The officers soon stop to get some coffee. Craig distracts them, while Elise spikes their drinks. After some time, the police van pulls over, and Craig is successful in hijacking the van with the prisoner inside. In the confusion and panic of the escape, Craig crashes the van and it rolls over a bridge. Elise, following behind in her car, is relieved to see Craig is all right, and the prisoner, though thrown from the van and severely injured, is also still alive. Elise soon receives a call from the case detective (Fulvio Cecere) informing her that Kozlowski had taken the police van and escaped. She is able to sound normal to avoid arousing any suspicion.

They take their captive to the basement of an abandoned cabin and chain him up, just as he did to their son. They gag him, stating that nothing he could say will make them change their minds. They berate him as less than human for his abominable actions. They begin to torture him in various painful ways. During one session, Craig hangs the key to the chains above the captive, taunting him. As the torture progresses over several days, both Elise and Craig are haunted by their deeds, but carry on, remembering the horrific loss of their son.

Meanwhile, the police manhunt for the escaped Kozlowski begins narrowing down to the area near the cabin.

Back in the basement, Craig removes the gag in an attempt to suffocate the captive, who begs for a chance to talk. He explains he has no recollection of anything before the van accident. He claims he does not think he could be a vicious killer. The Landrys are taken aback, and retreat upstairs to discuss. Craig feels the torture is unnecessary on someone who cannot even remember his crimes. Elise is certain he is merely lying to avoid any more suffering. They return to the basement and begin crushing his foot in a vice until he tells the truth. Elise demands that he speak their child's name. Under duress, he eventually says 'Benjamin', which convinces Craig that they can continue with their plan. They leave him alone for the evening, promising that the next day's torture will be the worst yet. Through extreme agony, he manages to reach the key and free himself. He makes his way upstairs and there is a struggle. Craig is knocked down the stairs and the captive escapes out the back door. The police finally track down and apprehend the captive in the woods nearby.

Flashbacks show that unknown to the Landrys, the prison van was actually carrying two convicts; Kozlowski, and another man, Patrick Galligan, serving time for tax evasion. Following the crash, Craig mistook the bloodied man thrown from the vehicle as Kozlowski and took him as a hostage to torture instead. The real Kozlowski later emerged from the van relatively unhurt and went on the run. Coming by the cabin, Kozlowski witnessed Elise's and Craig's torture of the amnesiac Galligan.

At the cabin, Elise and Craig enter the barn, finding Galligan (who they believe is Kozlowski) just as he hangs himself in the barn, with a note in hand. Based on what the couple did to him, having amnesia, he believes he must be a monster, and that he deserved everything they had done and would continue to do to him. In the letter, he apologizes and begs forgiveness, stating his cowardice and being unable to stand any more torture as his reasoning for hanging himself.

Satisfied, the Landrys get in their car and leave, unknowingly passing the police - who are returning Kozlowski to prison. The film ends before the Landrys discover the man they tortured was not Kozlowski.

== Cast ==
- Erika Christensen as Elise Landry
- Jesse Metcalfe as Craig Landry
- Bill Lippincott as Patrick Galligan
- Bill Moseley as John Kozlowski
- Fulvio Cecere as Detective Berger
- Chelah Horsdal as D.A. Liane Strader
- Aaron Pearl as Father
- Viv Leacock as Officer Patterson
- Yee Jee Tsoa as Dr. Scanlan
- Darryl Scheelar as Officer Alvarez
- Thomas Greenwood as Benjamin Landry
- Peter Abrams as Judge Stanley
- Stephen Millera as Dr. Locke
- Donita Dyer as Mrs. Holden

== Production ==
The Twisted Pictures film features Erika Christensen, Bill Moseley, and Jesse Metcalfe in the lead roles. It is based on the screenplay, "Act of Redress" by Czech screenwriter, Marek Posival, and was directed by Rob Lieberman.

The scenes involving the fictional "Paz Fuels" truck stop were shot in Langley, British Columbia, while the others scenes were filmed in Vancouver, British Columbia. Mark Burg, Oren Koules, Carl Mazzocone and Marek Posival produced the film for Twisted Light Productions. Minor roles are played by Zak Santiago, Lynn Colliar, Chelah Horsdal, and Fulvio Cecere. The role of Kozlowski was to originally be played by Charlie Sheen, but Sheen left the project on 30 June 2008.

== Soundtrack ==
The multi-instrumentalist Jeff Rona composed the score.

== Release ==
Eclectic Film Sales released the film on 8 November 2009 over the American Film Market. It had its premiere as part of the 2010 FrightFest. The film was released on DVD and Blu-ray in the UK on 18 October 2010. In 2012, it was released limitedly in theaters and on VOD in the US.

=== Critical reception ===
The Tortured received negative reviews. On Rotten Tomatoes, the film has a 6% approval rating, based on 18 reviews. On Metacritic, the film also has a score of 9 out of 100, based on 8 reviews. Rex Reed of The New York Observer wrote that the film is "unconvincingly written" and "awkwardly directed". Elizabeth Weitzman of the New York Daily News wrote, "There’s really nothing here to recommend, other than bravely stalwart performances from the leads. It is bluntly written, poorly shot and edited, and cruel without being clever."
