= Insidious: Chapter 3 (soundtrack) =

Insidious: Chapter 3 (Original Motion Picture Score)

Film score by Joseph Bishara
- Released: June 5, 2015
- Genre: Film score
- Length: 41:58
- Label: Void Recordings
- Producer: Joseph Bishara

Joseph Bishara chronology
Gorgeous Vortex (2014)	Insidious: Chapter 3 (2015)	The Vatican Tapes (2015)

Insidious: Chapter 3 (Original Motion Picture Score) is the film score to the 2015 supernatural horror film Insidious: Chapter 3 directed by Leigh Whannell, which is the prequel to Insidious (2010) and the third instalment in the Insidious franchise. The film score is composed by recurring franchise composer Joseph Bishara, whose soundtrack was released through Void Recordings in digital and CDs on June 5, 2015 and in vinyl LPs on July 7.

== Background ==
Recurring franchise composer Joseph Bishara returned to score music for Chapter 3. Bishara said that "Leigh did an excellent job with it and brings a bit of a different flavor". Former Slayer percussionist Dave Lombardo collaborated with Bishara on the score playing percussions and drums. Bishara conducted a mini string quartet with Lombardo handling the drums, along with two cellists, violist and violinist.

== Release ==
The film score was released through Bishara's Void Recordings in digital platforms and through CDs on June 5, 2015. A vinyl edition of the album was unveiled on July 7.

== Track listing ==
No.	Title	Length
1.	"The Insidious Flare"	1:37
2.	"Psychic Visit"	0:57
3.	"Tell of Presence"	1:40
4.	"Upside Down"	1:08
5.	"Back from Accident"	1:08
6.	"Standing Right Next to You"	1:35
7.	"Wheeled Away"	2:52
8.	"Questions Left Behind"	2:34
9.	"She Was Waiting"	1:06
10.	"Those Were Helped"	2:07
11.	"Follow the Leading"	2:17
12.	"Possessed Attacker"	2:25
13.	"Entity In the Dark"	2:00
14.	"Further Kept Pet"	2:04
15.	"Stronger, Alive"	1:03
16.	"Friendly Face"	1:48
17.	"Facing Breathing"	3:10
18.	"Visit from Light"	2:51
19.	"She Was There"	1:57
20.	"Kind Visitor"	0:35
21.	"Insidious Chapter 3"	2:31
22.	"Void Figure7 Ch3"	2:33
Total length:		41:58

== Reception ==
Movie Music Mania wrote "it's difficult to determine how much to fault the composer for this, as his scores remain effective in context. Unfortunately, that's the sacrifice he makes in taking this approach." Justin Lowe of The Hollywood Reporter wrote "composer Joseph Bishara assiduously attend to the critical musical details of this well-polished feature, contributing to the impression that the Insidious franchise may continue to benefit by branching out from its original premise, rather than recycling or returning to it". Kalyn Corrigan of Bloody Disgusting wrote "Composer Joseph Bishara’s impact on these films cannot be understated". David Crow of Den of Geek wrote "composer Joseph Bishara’s piano-smashing melodies" accompanied the film very well. Michael Gingold of Fangoria wrote "returning composer Joseph Bishara largely packs up the screechy strings of the first two pictures and finds other ways to sonically raise the hackles."

== Personnel ==
Credits adapted from liner notes:

- Music composer and producer – Joseph Bishara
- Recording – Chris Spilfogel, Fernando Morales Franchini
- Mixing – Chris Spilfogel
- Mastering – Dave Collins
- Musical Assistance – Alisa Burket, Lauren Aghajanian
- Graphic design – Unnaturally Geisha Studios, Inc.
- Drums – Dave Lombardo
- Piano – Saar Hendelman
