= Annabelle Comes Home (soundtrack) =

Annabelle Comes Home (Original Motion Picture Soundtrack)

Soundtrack album by Joseph Bishara
- Released: June 21, 2019
- Recorded: 2018–2019
- Studios: Eastwood Scoring Stage, Warner Bros. Studios, Burbank; Capitol Studios, Hollywood
- Genre: Film score
- Length: 53:25
- Label: WaterTower Music
- Producer: Joseph Bishara

Joseph Bishara chronology
The Curse of La Llorona (2019)	Annabelle Comes Home (2019)	Body Cam (2020)

Annabelle Comes Home (Original Motion Picture Soundtrack) is the film score to the 2019 film Annabelle Comes Home directed by Gary Dauberman, a sequel to Annabelle: Creation (2017) and as the sixth installment in The Conjuring shared universe. The film score is composed by Joseph Bishara and released through WaterTower Music on June 21, 2019.

== Development ==
Franchise veteran Joseph Bishara returned to compose for Annabelle Comes Home during early 2019. It was recorded at the Eastwood Scoring Stage in Warner Bros. Studios Burbank and Capitol Studios in Hollywood, Los Angeles, performed by the Hollywood Studio Symphony orchestra. The album was released through WaterTower Music on June 21, 2019, five days prior to the film's release.

== Reception ==
Jonathan Barkan of Dread Central noted it as "yet another stellar Joseph Bishara score amplify every scene." Justin Lowe of The Hollywood Reporter and Tim Grierson of Screen International described it as a "shiveringly shrill" and "slithering" score. Ben of Soundtrack Universe summarized "Annabelle Comes Home is simply another effort in a line of scores that have become nearly interchangeable with one another in tone and style. If one enjoyed Bishara's prior work for the franchise, then Annabelle 3 should satisfy." Owen Gleiberman of Variety described it as a "spine-chilling" score.

== Track listing ==
No.	Title	Length
1.	"Doll Opening"	0:48
2.	"Cemetery Pulls"	1:15
3.	"It's The Doll"	2:23
4.	"Doll Container"	2:52
5.	"Annabelle Comes Home"	0:43
6.	"Cross Keepsake"	0:56
7.	"Priest Follows"	0:53
8.	"No Secrets"	1:12
9.	"Locked Away"	0:53
10.	"Artifact Room"	2:13
11.	"Doll Drops"	0:31
12.	"Lost Somebody"	0:40
13.	"Life Somehow"	1:25
14.	"Led To Doll"	0:54
15.	"Miss Me"	1:06
16.	"Sometimes See Things"	2:08
17.	"Feely Meely"	2:01
18.	"Gone Missing"	1:12
19.	"Bedtime Tale"	0:40
20.	"Artifact Leading"	2:12
21.	"You Did This"	0:24
22.	"Doll Slumber"	1:22
23.	"Cathode Force"	2:55
24.	"Drawn By Voices"	1:37
25.	"Coins Roll"	1:28
26.	"The Ferryman"	0:44
27.	"Color Wheel"	1:38
28.	"Wants A Soul"	3:59
29.	"Red Eyed Hunt"	1:17
30.	"Armor Tells"	1:30
31.	"Hauntings Compel"	1:39
32.	"Locked Behind Glass"	0:52
33.	"Talk Somewhere Else"	0:44
34.	"Birthday Made"	2:08
35.	"Good Out There"	2:30
36.	"Wheel Traces Doll"	0:34
Total length:		52:18

== Personnel ==
Credits adapted from WaterTower Music:

- Music written, composed, produced and conducted by – Joseph Bishara
- Performer – Hollywood Studio Symphony
- Orchestration – Dana Niu
- Contractor – Peter Rotter
- Concertmaster – Daphne Chen
- Recording – Chris Spilfogel, Fernando Morales Franchini
- Mixing – Chris Spilfogel
- Mastering – Dave Collins
- Score editor – Julie Pearce
- Pro-tools operator – Tom Hardisty
- Soundtrack coordinator – Jen O'Malley
- Copyist – Eric Stonerook
- Art direction – Sandeep Sriram
- Cello – Richard Dodd (principal), Alisha Bauer, Vanessa Freebairn-Smith
- Contrabass – Stephen Dress (principal), Ian Walker, Michael Valerio, Stephanie Payne, Thomas Harte
- Harp – Alison Bjorkedal (principal), Lara Somogyi
- Keyboards – Vicki Ray (principal), Robert Thies
- Percussion – Cory Hills (principal), Matthew Cook, Nicholas Terry
- Trombone – Alexander Iles (principal), William Reichenbach
- Tuba – Doug Tornquist (principal), Gary Hickman
- Viola – Leah Katz (principal), Aaron Oltman, Alma Fernandez, Andrew Duckles, Carolyn Riley, Zach Dellinger, Lauren Baba
- Violin – Eric Gorfain (principal 2nd), Ana Landauer, Benjamin Powell, Benjamin Jacobson, Charlie Bisharat, Eliza Chorley, Helen Nightengale, Irina Voloshina, Katie Sloan, Lorenz Gamma, Luanne Homzy, Lucia Micarelli, Marisa Kuney, Maya Magub, Minyoung Chang, Natalie Leggett, Phillip Levy, Tamara Hatwan
