= Insidious: Out of the Further =

2026 film by Jacob Chase

- Theatrical release poster
- Directed by: Jacob Chase
- Screenplay by: Jacob Chase
- Story by: David Leslie Johnson-McGoldrick; Jacob Chase
- Based on: Characters by Leigh Whannell
- Produced by: Jason Blum; Oren Peli; James Wan; Leigh Whannell
- Starring: Amelia Eve; Brandon Perea; Maisie Richardson-Sellers; Lin Shaye
- Cinematography: Dave Garbett
- Edited by: Gregory Plotkin; Anna Rottke
- Music by: Joseph Bishara
- Production companies: Screen Gems; Stage 6 Films; Blumhouse Atomic Monster
- Distributed by: Sony Pictures Releasing
- Release dates: August 18, 2026 (Los Angeles); August 21, 2026 (United States)
- Running time: 106 minutes
- Country: United States
- Language: English
- Budget: $18 million
- Box office: $171.7 million

Insidious: Out of the Further is a 2026 American supernatural horror film written and directed by Jacob Chase from a screen story he wrote with David Leslie Johnson-McGoldrick. It serves as a sequel to Insidious: The Red Door (2023) and is the sixth installment in the Insidious franchise. In the film, a young woman who can interact with and bring spirits to the mortal world is soon haunted by malevolent forces. It stars Amelia Eve, Brandon Perea, and Maisie Richardson-Sellers, with Lin Shaye reprising her role from the previous films.

Insidious: Out of the Further premiered at AMC The Grove 14 in Los Angeles, California, on August 18, 2026, and was theatrically released in the United States by Sony Pictures Releasing on August 21, 2026. The film received generally mixed reviews from critics and has grossed $171.6 million worldwide with a budget of $18 million.

== Plot ==
In Pittsburgh, 1999, after her mother, Ingrid, seemingly has a mental breakdown, a young Gemma Hall witnesses her die by suicide in the bathroom before a supernatural force shuts the door.

Two decades later, Gemma, now a single mother and dental hygienist, raises her daughter Maya in her childhood home and is dating Nick, a police officer. While walking Maya home from school, Gemma sees three elderly people walking down the sidewalk. One night, Gemma astral projects and is haunted by visions of Ingrid's suicide. In another projection, Gemma is hunted by one of the elderly people and discovers that she brought back a brooch from the dream.

The next day, Gemma is scheduled to have a cleaning with Lester, one of the elderly people. Lester bites Gemma's finger, causing her to hit her head on the X-ray machine, which knocks her out and sends her into the Further. Gemma wanders the clinic before a blindfolded man restrains her in a chair. Several spirits surround her, and the man chooses one to approach her. Gemma is saved by Elise Rainier, who hands her a book and tasks Gemma with finding her. Using the address in the book, Gemma goes to Abandon, a tattoo shop run by Clare, another astral projector.

Elise temporarily possesses Clare and explains to Gemma that she is a "courier", an astral projector who can transport objects between the Further and the material world. She tells Clare that the blindfolded man is planning to use Gemma to resurrect spirits, and that the elderly people are his acolytes who use sedatives to force themselves into the Further. Gemma tells Nick her situation, who is in disbelief but offers to stay the night. Later, Gemma again astral projects and is attacked by the blindfolded man. He forces Gemma to hold hands with the spirit from the clinic, and she transports half of his body back to the real world.

Gemma spots the acolytes in her neighbors' home across the street. With Nick's help, she sneaks into the home and finds a television playing a VHS tape. Gemma discovers that the blindfolded man is Cyrus Lam, a cult leader who grew his following in the Further by promising resurrection. Clare goes to Gemma's house and communicates Elise's plan: lure Cyrus into a Red Door in the Further and lock him inside, while Nick awakens the acolytes to stop them from projecting.

Gemma and Elise enter the Further and are attacked by two of the acolytes. Nick breaks into the neighbors' home and discovers the owner's corpses. After searching the house, he discovers two of the acolytes beneath the floorboards and wakes them up. The two find Ingrid within the Further, and Gemma discovers that Ingrid was also a courier and had killed herself to protect her from Cyrus. While rewatching Ingrid's suicide, Gemma slams the door shut on her younger self. Gemma reconciles with Ingrid, and Elise realizes Maya inherited the ability to astral project. While staying at another neighbor's, Maya falls asleep and astral projects, where she is attacked by Lester as Nick is unable to wake him up.

Cyrus uses Maya to bring dozens of his followers to the real world, slowly killing her. Gemma awakes to save Maya, but is overwhelmed by several of Cyrus' followers. Elise possesses the body of Lester and rescues Maya. Due to their failure, Cyrus kills all three acolytes. Gemma is cornered by Cyrus, but she manages to transport the entire house into the Further. The resurrected dead, enraged that Cyrus failed to restore them fully, attack and consume him. Gemma says goodbye to Elise and Ingrid before awakening in the real world and reuniting with Maya, Nick, and Clare.

In a mid-credits scene, Cyrus wakes up in the Further after his attack, where he is restrained in a dental chair and tortured by a ghostly dentist. A key-fingered demon locks them in a cell behind a red door.

== Cast ==
- Amelia Eve as Gemma Hall
  - Charli Penton as young Gemma
- Brandon Perea as Nick Mendoza
- Maisie Richardson-Sellers as Clare
- Lin Shaye as Elise Rainier
- Sam Spruell as Cyrus Lam
- Island Austin as Maya Hall
- Laura Gordon as Ingrid Hall
- Joseph Lopez as Lester
  - Ben Keller as young Lester
- Robina Beard as Edna
  - Emma Campbell as young Edna
- Susan Grey as Patsy
- Zahra Newman as Liz
- Joseph Bishara as Lipstick-Face Demon
- Taylor Bogrand as Doll Girl
- David Kambouris as Bride in Black
- Christopher Stenning as Wheezing Man
- Jasper Cleary as Keyface

== Production ==
In May 2024, Sony Pictures reported that a sixth Insidious film was in development. In September 2025, it was announced that Jacob Chase would direct the film and co-write the script with David Leslie Johnson-McGoldrick; ultimately, Chase solely received screenplay credit, while he and Johnson-McGoldrick received story credit. Lin Shaye, Amelia Eve, Maisie Richardson-Sellers, Sam Spruell, Island Austin, and Laura Gordon joining the cast. Brandon Perea was later cast in a lead role.

Principal photography began on September 29, 2025, in Melbourne, Victoria at the Docklands Studios Melbourne. Other Victorian filming locations include Camberwell, Essendon and Kensington, which served as stand-ins for New England. Filming wrapped on November 13. In December, the title was reported as Insidious: The Bleeding World. In April 2026, the official title was revealed to be Insidious: Out of the Further.

The film's score is composed by Joseph Bishara, who returned to the franchise after composing the first five films in the series.

== Release ==
Insidious: Out of the Further premiered on August 18, 2026 at AMC The Grove 14 in Los Angeles, California, and was theatrically released in the United States on August 21, 2026. It was originally scheduled to be released on August 29, 2025, but was removed from the release schedule in December 2024.

=== Home media ===
Insidious: Out of the Further was released digitally on October 6, 2026.

== Reception ==
=== Box office ===
Insidious: Out of the Further grossed $66.1 million in the United States and Canada, and $105.5 million in other territories, for a worldwide gross of $171.6 million.

=== Critical response ===
On the review aggregator website Rotten Tomatoes, 57% of 136 critics' reviews are positive, with an average rating of 5.6/10. The website's consensus reads: "If Out of the Further's modest efforts to put a fresh spin on Insidious only serve to underline how formulaic this franchise has become, some chilling set pieces distinguish it as one of the most effective entries yet." Metacritic, which uses a weighted average, assigned the film a score of 47 out of 100, based on 26 critics, indicating "mixed or average" reviews. Audiences polled by CinemaScore gave the film an average grade of "C+" on an A+ to F scale, the same as its predecessor.
