= Insidious (film series) =

Horror film franchise

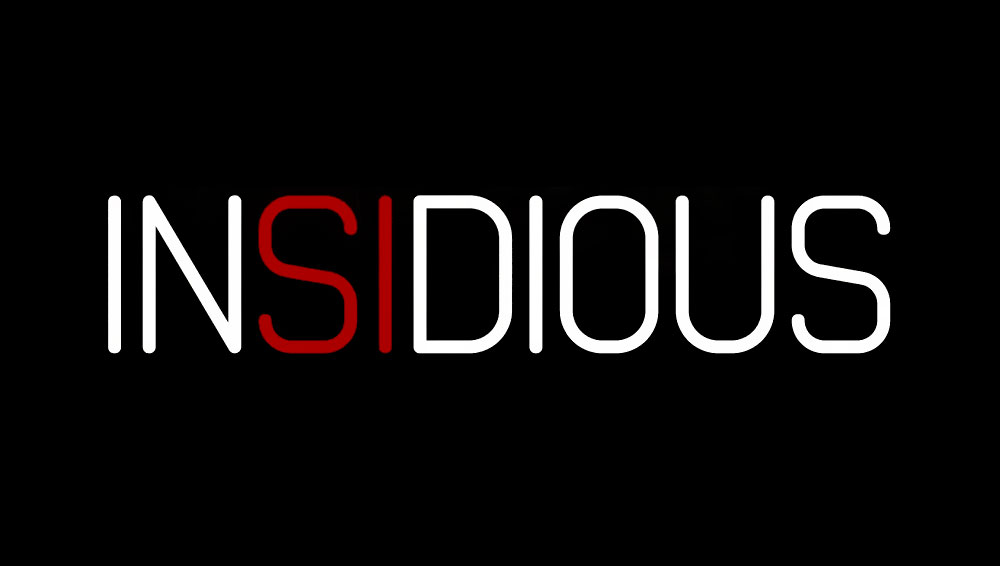
- Official franchise logo
- Directed by: James Wan (1–2); Leigh Whannell (3); Adam Robitel (4); Patrick Wilson (5); Jacob Chase (6); Jeremy Slater (7)
- Written by: Leigh Whannell (1–4); Scott Teems (5); Jacob Chase (6); Jeremy Slater (7)
- Based on: Characters created by Leigh Whannell
- Produced by: Oren Peli (1–6); Jason Blum; James Wan (3–7); Leigh Whannell (4–6); Steven Schneider (1); Michael Clear (7)
- Starring: Patrick Wilson; Rose Byrne; Ty Simpkins; Lin Shaye; Leigh Whannell; Angus Sampson; Various other actors; (See details below)
- Music by: Joseph Bishara
- Production companies: Blumhouse Productions (Note: Credited as Haunted Movies for the first film.); Stage 6 Films (1–6); Alliance Films (1); IM Global (1); Entertainment One (2–3); Screen Gems (5–7); Atomic Monster (6-7)
- Distributed by: FilmDistrict (1–2); Focus Features (3); Universal Pictures (4); Sony Pictures Releasing (5–7)
- Country: United States
- Language: English
- Budget: $60.5 million (6 films)
- Box office: $916 million (6 films)

Insidious is an American supernatural horror franchise created by Leigh Whannell and James Wan that has been produced by Blumhouse Productions in association with Sony's Stage 6 Films since 2010. The films in the franchise include Insidious (2010), Chapter 2 (2013), Chapter 3 (2015), The Last Key (2018), The Red Door (2023), and Out of the Further (2026). The films have grossed over $916 million worldwide on a combined budget of $60.5 million.

The first two films were directed by Wan and the third by Whannell (who also served as the screenwriter for the first four films). Adam Robitel directed the fourth installment, Patrick Wilson directed the fifth installment (the films marked the respective directorial debuts for Whannell and Wilson), and Jacob Chase directed the sixth installment. Jeremy Slater is set to write and direct the first spin-off and seventh installment. FilmDistrict released the first and second films, while Focus Features, Universal Pictures, and Sony Pictures Releasing handled the third, fourth, fifth, and sixth, respectively.

The first two films center on a couple who, after their son mysteriously enters a comatose state and becomes a vessel for ghosts in an astral plane, are continuously haunted by demons from a forbidden realm known as the Further until they take from the family what they want most: life. The couple hire a team of paranormal investigators to help get their son back.

The third film, a prequel, focuses on the same psychic who helped the family; this time she comes to the aid of a young girl who calls out to the dead. The fourth film follows her when her own family becomes haunted. The fifth film follows a grown-up Dalton and his relationship with his father, with the two having to uncover their repressed past. While Josh is haunted by his father's spirit, Dalton gets terrorized by the titular demon of his past. The sixth film, a standalone, follows a young woman named Gemma Hall, who can interact with and bring spirits to the mortal world is soon haunted by malevolent forces.

Lin Shaye is the only actor to have appeared in every installment, while Leigh Whannell and Angus Sampson were in the first five films.

== Films ==
Insidious story chronology
- Insidious: Chapter 3 (2015)
- Insidious: The Last Key (2018)
- Insidious (2011)
- Insidious: Chapter 2 (2013)
- Insidious: The Red Door (2023)
- Insidious: Out of the Further (2026)

Overview of Insidious films
Film	U.S. release date	Directed by	Screenplay by	Story by	Produced by	Status
Insidious	April 1, 2011	James Wan	Leigh Whannell	Leigh Whannell	Oren Peli, Jason Blum & Steven Schneider	Released
Insidious: Chapter 2	September 13, 2013	James Wan	Leigh Whannell	James Wan & Leigh Whannell	Oren Peli & Jason Blum	Released
Insidious: Chapter 3	June 5, 2015	Leigh Whannell	Leigh Whannell	Leigh Whannell	Oren Peli, James Wan & Jason Blum	Released
Insidious: The Last Key	January 5, 2018	Adam Robitel	Leigh Whannell	Leigh Whannell	Oren Peli, James Wan, Jason Blum & Leigh Whannell	Released
Insidious: The Red Door	July 7, 2023	Patrick Wilson	Scott Teems	Leigh Whannell & Scott Teems	Oren Peli, James Wan, Jason Blum & Leigh Whannell	Released
Insidious: Out of the Further	August 21, 2026	Jacob Chase	Jacob Chase	David Leslie Johnson-McGoldrick & Jacob Chase	Oren Peli, James Wan, Jason Blum & Leigh Whannell	Released
Thread: An Insidious Tale	TBA	Jeremy Slater	Jeremy Slater	Jeremy Slater	Jason Blum, James Wan & Michael Clear	In development

=== Insidious (2010) ===
Insidious was directed by James Wan, written by Leigh Whannell, and starred Patrick Wilson, Rose Byrne and Barbara Hershey. The story centers on a couple whose son inexplicably enters a comatose state and becomes a vessel for ghosts in an astral plane. The film had its world premiere on September 14, 2010, at the 2010 Toronto International Film Festival (TIFF) and was released in theaters on April 1, 2011, and is FilmDistrict's first theatrical release. The film's success led to it being used as inspiration for a maze in Universal's Halloween Horror Nights in 2013, 2015 and 2017.

=== Insidious: Chapter 2 (2013) ===
Insidious: Chapter 2 was also directed by Wan and written by Whannell. The film stars Wilson and Byrne reprising their roles as Josh and Renai Lambert, a husband and wife who seek to uncover the secret that has left them dangerously connected to the spirit world. The film was released on September 13, 2013. It was a box-office success, grossing over $161 million worldwide, but received mixed reviews.

=== Insidious: Chapter 3 (2015) ===
Insidious: Chapter 3 is the third film in the series, written and directed by Whannell. The film is a prequel to the haunting of the Lambert family in the first two films, and stars Stefanie Scott, Dermot Mulroney, Lin Shaye, and Whannell. The plot follows a girl—Quinn—who is haunted by a demon after trying to call out to her mother Lillith, who died. It was released on June 5, 2015.

=== Insidious: The Last Key (2018) ===
Insidious: The Last Key is the fourth film in the series while chronologically taking place between the third and first installments. Lin Shaye reprises her role as Elise Rainier alongside Spencer Locke, Caitlin Gerard, Bruce Davison. The plot centers on the Rainier haunting, after a young Elise opened a forbidden red door and unwillingly allowed an extremely dangerous spirit known as the Key Demon to enter the human world. Directed by Adam Robitel and written by Whannell, the film was released on January 5, 2018.

=== Insidious: The Red Door (2023) ===
Insidious: The Red Door is the fifth film in the series and serves as a direct sequel to Insidious: Chapter 2. The film is Patrick Wilson's directorial debut, while Scott Teems serves as screenwriter, based on an original story by Whannell and Teems. The plot centers around a now-grown Dalton Lambert and his relationship with his father, with the two having to uncover their repressed past. Wilson, Ty Simpkins, Andrew Astor, Rose Byrne, Whannell, Angus Sampson, and Lin Shaye all reprise their roles from the first two films with Sinclair Daniel joining the cast. It was released on July 7, 2023.

=== Insidious: Out of the Further (2026) ===
In May 2024, a sixth untitled Insidious film was announced to be in development, from Sony Pictures. The film was originally scheduled to be released on August 29, 2025, but was removed from the release schedule in December 2024. In January 2025, it received the new release date of August 21, 2026.

In September 2025, it was revealed that Jacob Chase would direct the film and co-write the script with David Leslie Johnson-McGoldrick. Lin Shaye and Amelia Eve joined the cast, with principal photography scheduled to begin on September 15, 2025, in Australia.

== Insidious: The Further You Fear ==
Insidious: The Further You Fear was a 2025 canceled live-show which was set to tour in 80 cities based on the franchise.

== Future ==
=== Possible crossover ===
In January 2018, during a press interview for The Last Key, Jason Blum stated that a crossover film between Insidious and Sinister had previously been in development. He also said that he personally believed it had potential for re-entering development in the future, stating that "we're going to cross our worlds at some point... We're going to try".

=== Spin-off ===
In January 2022, a new film in the franchise titled Thread, was revealed to be in development. While the plot was not revealed, Jeremy Slater was hired to serve as writer and director in his directorial debut, with James Wan serving as producer. By May 2023, it was announced that the film would be a spin-off from the mainline series and be titled Thread: An Insidious Tale. Mandy Moore and Kumail Nanjiani will co-star.

== Recurring cast and characters ==
List indicators

This section includes characters who will appear or have appeared in more than two films in the series.

- An empty grey cell indicates the character was not in the film, or that the character's official presence has not yet been confirmed.
- ^{A} indicates an appearance through archival footage or audio.
- ^{C} indicates a cameo role.
- ^{P} indicates an appearance in onscreen photographs.
- ^{V} indicates a voice-only role.
- ^{Y} indicates a younger version of the character.

Character	Films					
Character	Insidious	Insidious: Chapter 2	Insidious: Chapter 3	Insidious: The Last Key	Insidious: The Red Door	Insidious: Out of the Further
Character	2010	2013	2015	2018	2023	2026
Humans
Elise Rainier	Lin Shaye	Lin Shaye Lindsay Seim^{Y}	Lin Shaye	Lin Shaye Hana Hayes^{T} Ava Kolker^{Y}	Lin Shaye	Lin Shaye
Steven "Specs"	Leigh Whannell	Leigh Whannell	Leigh Whannell	Leigh Whannell	Leigh Whannell	Leigh Whannell^{A}
Tucker	Angus Sampson	Angus Sampson	Angus Sampson	Angus Sampson	Angus Sampson	Angus Sampson^{A}
Josh Lambert	Patrick Wilson Josh Feldman^{Y}^{P}	Patrick Wilson Garrett Ryan^{Y}^{P}	Garrett Ryan^{Y}^{P}	Patrick Wilson^{A}	Patrick Wilson Kasjan Wilson^{Y}^{P}	Patrick Wilson^{A}
Renai Lambert	Rose Byrne	Rose Byrne	Mentioned	Rose Byrne^{A}	Rose Byrne	Rose Byrne^{A}
Dalton Lambert	Ty Simpkins	Ty Simpkins	Mentioned	Ty Simpkins^{A}	Ty Simpkins Kasjan Wilson^{Y}^{P}	Ty Simpkins^{A}
Lorraine Lambert	Barbara Hershey	Barbara Hershey Jocelin Donahue^{Y}	Mentioned	Barbara Hershey^{V}	Barbara Hershey^{A}^{P}	
Foster Lambert	Andrew Astor	Andrew Astor	Mentioned		Andrew Astor	
Kali Lambert	Brynn & Madison Bowie	Brynn & Madison Bowie	Mentioned		Juliana Davies	
Carl		Steve Coulter Hank Harris^{Y}	Steve Coulter		Steve Coulter	
Quinn Brenner			Stefanie Scott			
Sean Brenner			Dermot Mulroney			
Alex Brenner			Tate Berney			
Maggie			Hayley Kiyoko			
Lillith "Lily" Brenner			Ele Keats			
Melissa Rainier				Spencer Locke		
Imogen Rainier				Caitlin Gerard		
Christian Rainier				Bruce Davison Thomas Robie^{T} Pierce Pope^{Y}		
Gerald Rainier				Josh Stewart		
Audrey Rainier				Tessa Ferrer		
Ted Garza				Kirk Acevedo		
Chris Winslow					Sinclair Daniel	
Nick the Dick					Peter Dager	
Professor Armagan					Hiam Abbass	
Alec Anderson					Justin Sturgis	
Gemma Hall						Amelia Eve Charli Penton^{Y}
Nick Mendoza						Brandon Perea
Clare						Maisie Richardson-Sellers
Cyrus Lam						Sam Spruell
Maya Hall						Island Austin
Ingrid Hall						Laura Gordon
Liz						Zahra Newman
Lester						Joshua Lopez Ben Keller^{Y}
Edna						Robina Beard Emma Campbell^{Y}
Patsy						Susan Grey
Entities
Parker "Marilyn" Crane The Bride in Black	Philip Friedman	Tom Fitzpatrick Tyler Griffin^{Y}	Tom Fitzpatrick		Tom Fitzpatrick^{A}	David Kambouris
Lipstick-Face Demon	Joseph Bishara		Joseph Bishara	Joseph Bishara	Joseph Bishara	Joseph Bishara
Dancing Boy	Ben Woolf					Max Sheedy
Long Haired Fiend	J. LaRose	J. LaRose				
Doll Girl	Kelly Devoto					Taylor Bogrand
Michelle Crane The Woman in White	Mentioned	Danielle Bisutti				
Wheezing Man The Man Who Can't Breathe			Michael Reid MacKay			Christopher Stenning
Keyface				Javier Botet		Jasper Cleary
Benjamin "Ben" Burton Smash Face					David Call	

== Additional crew and production details ==
Film	Crew/Detail					
Film	Composer	Cinematographer(s)	Editor(s)	Production companies	Distributing company	Running time
Insidious	Joseph Bishara	John R. Leonetti; David M. Brewer	James Wan; Kirk Morri	Stage 6 Films; Alliance Films; IM Global; Haunted Movies	FilmDistrict	102 min
Insidious: Chapter 2	Joseph Bishara	John R. Leonetti	Kirk Morri	Stage 6 Films; Entertainment One; Blumhouse Productions	FilmDistrict	106 min
Insidious: Chapter 3	Joseph Bishara	Brian Pearson	Tim Alverson	Stage 6 Films; Entertainment One; Blumhouse Productions	Focus Features	97 min
Insidious: The Last Key	Joseph Bishara	Toby Oliver	Tim Alverson	Stage 6 Films; Blumhouse Productions	Universal Pictures	103 min
Insidious: The Red Door	Joseph Bishara	Autumn Eakin	Derek Ambrosi; Michel Aller	Screen Gems; Stage 6 Films; Blumhouse Productions	Sony Pictures Releasing	107 min
Insidious: Out of the Further	Joseph Bishara	Dave Garbett	Gregory Plotkin; Anna Rottke	Screen Gems; Stage 6 Films; Blumhouse Atomic Monster	Sony Pictures Releasing	106 min
Thread: An Insidious Tale	TBA	TBA	TBA	Screen Gems; Blumhouse Atomic	Sony Pictures Releasing	TBA

== Reception ==
=== Box office performance ===
Film	Release date	Box office revenue			Budget	Ref.
Film	Release date	North America	Other territories	Worldwide	Budget	Ref.
Insidious	April 1, 2011	$54,009,150	$46,097,304	$100,106,454	$1.5 million	
Insidious: Chapter 2	September 13, 2013	$83,586,447	$78,335,068	$161,921,515	$5 million	
Insidious: Chapter 3	June 5, 2015	$52,218,558	$68,234,597	$120,453,155	$10 million	
Insidious: The Last Key	January 5, 2018	$67,745,330	$105,066,641	$172,811,971	$10 million	
Insidious: The Red Door	July 7, 2023	$82,156,962	$106,933,685	$189,090,647	$16 million	
Insidious: Out of the Further	August 21, 2026	$66,116,208	$105486394	$171,602,602	$18 million	
Total		$405,832,655	$510,153,689	$915,986,344	$60.5 million	

=== Critical and public response ===
Film	Rotten Tomatoes	Metacritic	CinemaScore
Insidious	66% (176 reviews)	52 (30 reviews)	B
Insidious: Chapter 2	38% (132 reviews)	40 (30 reviews)	B+
Insidious: Chapter 3	55% (130 reviews)	52 (26 reviews)	B+
Insidious: The Last Key	34% (111 reviews)	49 (23 reviews)	B-
Insidious: The Red Door	40% (120 reviews)	45 (23 reviews)	C+
Insidious: Out of the Further	57% (136 reviews)	47 (26 reviews)	C+
