= Angus Sampson =

Australian actor

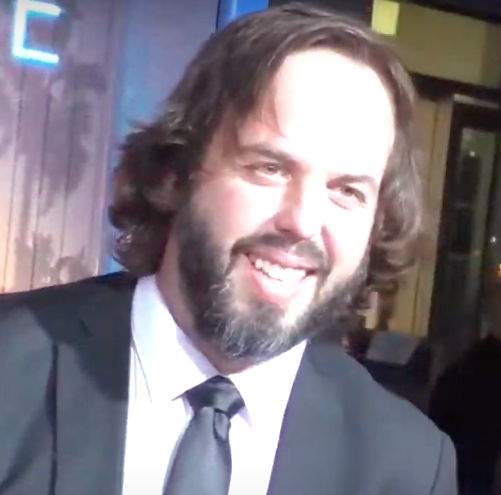
- Sampson in 2016
- Born: Sydney, New South Wales, Australia
- Occupations: Actor; director; producer; writer
- Years active: 1996–present

Angus Sampson (Note: There is conflicting information regarding his birth year. Some sources claim 1979. However, articles from The Age and The Sydney Morning Herald that were published in 1999 have 24 listed as his age, which imply a 1974 or 1975 birth year.) is an Australian actor and filmmaker. He is best known for his performances as Tucker in the Insidious film series, Ray Jenkins in The Mule (2014), the Organic Mechanic in Mad Max: Fury Road (2015) and Furiosa: A Mad Max Saga (2024), Bear Gerhardt in the second season of Fargo, Dom Chalmers in Bump (2021-present) and Cisco in The Lincoln Lawyer (2022-present).

== Early life ==
Sampson was born in Sydney, and was educated at Trinity Grammar School in Summer Hill and at The Armidale School in northern New South Wales. He graduated from the AWARD School in 2002.

== Career ==
=== Acting ===
Sampson's acting career launched in 1996 with the role as Dylan Lewis's sidekick on Recovery, an ABC youth music show. Later television jobs include roles on The Secret Life of Us, The 10:30 Slot, and Greeks on the Roof. and as Ali in an episode of Stingers. He has appeared as a performer on the improvised show Thank God You're Here. In 2007, Sampson portrayed television personality Ugly Dave Gray in the television film The King which examines the life of Australian TV legend Graham Kennedy. In the same year, he also appeared in Wilfred. The following year he played Leonardo da Vinci in the children's television series Time Trackers and Michael Thorneycroft in the three final episodes of Underbelly.

In 2010, Sampson helped his friend and fellow former Recovery presenter Leigh Whannell develop a horror film called Insidious. The film was released in September 2010, with Whannell and Sampson playing "comical low-tech paranormal investigators" Specs and Tucker, roles they have reprised in the film's three follow-ups. Sampson was a special guest juror at the 2006 Melbourne International Film Festival, and host of the 2010 IF Awards, broadcast on SBS TV.

Sampson has since played a diverse array of film roles. In the same year as Insidious, he was the suit actor for the role of Bull in Spike Jonze's Where the Wild Things Are.

In 2015, Sampson starred on the second season of the FX show Fargo, playing the character Bear Gerhardt. He starred as "Ozzy" in The Walking Dead.

Since 2022, Sampson has played the lead role of investigator Dennis "Cisco" Wojciechowski in the Netflix drama series The Lincoln Lawyer, based on the novel of the same name and written by Michael Connelly.

=== Radio ===
Sampson was an occasional co-host of Australian radio show Get This with Tony Martin on Triple M. Sampson was a founding member of The Forbidden Fruit, an experimental troupe whose only performance was a risque interpretation of Mad Max 2 they performed on late night radio, in which Angus played The Lord Humongous, who turned out to be quite proficient with the jazz flute. Sampson has also been a presenter on RRR's Breakfasters program. In addition, Sampson was also the un-credited host of the cult classic late-night radio show The Lonely Hearts Club, a deadpan comedy series which ran on ABC Radio National in early 2011 in which Sampson appeared under the pseudonym Richard Silk.

== Filmography ==
=== Film ===
Year	Title	Role	Notes	Ref.
1998	Dags	Prozac		
1999	Smile & Wave	Ray	Short film	
2003	The Referees	Stevo	Short film	
2003	Darkness Falls	Raymond "Ray" Winchester		
2003	Razor Eaters	Syksey		
2005	You and Your Stupid Mate	Jeffrey		
2006	Kokoda	Dan		
2006	Footy Legends	Lloydy		
2007	Feeling Lonely?	Rob	Short film	
2007	Rats and Cats	Robber		
2009	The Last Supper	Judas	Short film	
2009	The Wake	Jonathan	Short film	
2009	Celestial Avenue	Ah Gong	Short film	
2009	Where the Wild Things Are	The Bull Suit Performer		
2010	I Love You Too	Thug		
2010	Pop	Man	Short film	
2010	Summer Coda	Franky Tanner		
2010	Insidious	Tucker		
2010	Legend of the Guardians: The Owls of Ga'Hoole	Jutt (voice)	Animated feature film	
2011	It's him... Terry Lim!	Director	Short documentary film	
2011	There's a Hippopotamus on Our Roof Eating Cake	Father	Short film	
2011	Post Apocalyptic Man	Barfly	Short film	
2011	Tender	Max	Short film	
2011	Teddy	Jim	Short film	
2011	Attack	Soldier	Short film	
2012	100 Bloody Acres	Lindsay Morgan		
2013	Blinder	Franky		
2013	Insidious: Chapter 2	Tucker		
2014	The Mule	Ray Jenkins	Also co-writer, co-director and producer	
2015	Now Add Honey	Mick Croyston		
2015	Mad Max: Fury Road	Organic Mechanic		
2015	Insidious: Chapter 3	Tucker		
2018	Insidious: The Last Key	Tucker		
2018	Benji	Titus Weld		
2018	Winchester	John Hansen		
2021	Mortal Kombat	Goro (voice)		
2022	Thor: Love and Thunder		Scene deleted	
2023	Insidious: The Red Door	Tucker		
2023	Next Goal Wins	Angus Bendleton		
2024	Furiosa: A Mad Max Saga	Organic Mechanic		
2025	Bump: A Christmas Film	Dom Chalmers		
2026	Deep Water	Dan		
2026	They Will Kill You	The P.I.		

=== Television ===
Year	Title	Role	Notes	Ref.
1996–2000	Recovery	Co-Host	Various episodes	
2001, 2002	Blue Heelers	Glenn Rossiter / Tony Costa	2 episodes	
2002	Short Cuts	DJ	Episode: "What a Feeling"	
2003	Stingers	Ali	Episode: "Cul-De-Sac"	
2003	Greeks on the Roof	Dimi	11 episodes	
2004, 2005	The Secret Life of Us	Video Shop Guy / Tyrone	2 episodes	
2006–2009	Thank God You're Here	Himself	11 episodes	
2007	Wilfred	Cyros	Episode: "Dog Eat Dog"	
2007	The King	Ugly Dave Gray	TV film	
2007	Chandon Pictures	Bevan	2 episodes	
2008	Underbelly	Michael Thorneycroft	3 episodes	
2008	Time Trackers	Leonardo da Vinci	Episode: "Da Vinci"	
2010	The Librarians	Xavier Fisher	4 episodes	
2010–2011	Spirited	Zach Hannigan	15 episodes	
2012	Beaconsfield	Brett 'Cress' Cresswell	TV film	
2012	Howzat! Kerry Packer's War	Allan Johnston	2 episodes	
2012	Beaconsfield	Brett 'Cress' Cresswell	TV film	
2013	Paper Giants: Magazine Wars	Patrick Bowring	TV miniseries, 2 episodes	
2014	Party Tricks	Wayne Duffy	6 episodes	
2015	Fargo	Bear Gerhardt	9 episodes	
2016–2017	Shut Eye	Fonso Marks	20 episodes	
2018	Nightflyers	Rowan	Main role	
2018	Voltron: Legendary Defender	Ranveig (voice)	Episode: "Kral Zera"	
2018	Drunk History	Hughes	Episode: "Death"	
2019	The Walking Dead	Ozzy	2 episodes	
2019	No Activity	Chief	6 episodes	
2021	The Stand	Garvey	Episode: "The House of the Dead"	
2021	Jurassic World Camp Cretaceous	Hap (voice)	3 episodes	
2021–24	Bump	Dom Chalmers	45 episodes	
2022–present	The Lincoln Lawyer	Dennis 'Cisco' Wojciechowski	40 episodes	
2022	Our Flag Means Death	King George	3 episodes	
2022	Reservation Dogs	Chemist	Episode: "This is Where the Plot Thickens"	
2023	Koala Man	General Peckmeister, Wizened Garbage Man and various characters	8 episodes	
2024	Heartbreak High	Timothy Voss	8 episodes	
2026	NCIS: Sydney	Lee Meyers	3 episodes	

== Stage ==
Year	Title	Role	Notes	Ref.
1996	Theatresports – The Best of 1996 Show		The Comedy Store, Petersham	
2003	Mojo		The Store Room, Melbourne	
2004	Happy New		The Store Room, Melbourne	
2005	Playing the Victim		Red Stitch Actors Theatre, Melbourne	

== Accolades ==
Year	Award	Category	Film	Result	Ref.
2014	AACTA Award	Best Supporting Actor	100 Bloody Acres	Nominated	
2014	AFCA Awards	Best Supporting Actor	100 Bloody Acres	Nominated	
2014	AFCA Awards	Best Actor	The Mule	Nominated	
