= The Conjuring 2 (soundtrack) =

The Conjuring 2 (Original Motion Picture Soundtrack)

Film score by Joseph Bishara
- Released: June 3, 2016
- Recorded: 2016
- Studios: Newman Scoring Stage, 20th Century Fox Studios, Los Angeles; Eastwood Scoring Stage, Warner Bros. Studios, Burbank; United Recording Studios, Los Angeles; Abbey Road Studios, London
- Genre: Film score
- Length: 53:25
- Label: WaterTower Music
- Producer: Joseph Bishara

Joseph Bishara chronology
The Other Side of the Door (2016)	The Conjuring 2 (2016)	The Worthy (2016)

The Conjuring 2 (Original Motion Picture Soundtrack) is the film score composed by Joseph Bishara for the 2016 film The Conjuring 2, directed by James Wan; the third installment of The Conjuring Universe and the sequel to The Conjuring (2013). The score was released under the label WaterTower Music on June 3, 2016.

== Background ==
Joseph Bishara, who composed music for the predecessor returned to score The Conjuring 2. It was recorded at the Newman Scoring Stage at 20th Century Fox Studios, Eastwood Scoring Stage at Warner Bros. Studios Burbank, United Recording Studios at Los Angeles and Abbey Road Studios in London. The score featured orchestral portions performed by the Hollywood Studio Symphony under Bishara's conducting and Dana Niu's orchestration and the 31-member choral ensemble from London Voices. The score was released under the WaterTower Music label on June 3, 2016, a week prior to the film's release.

== Reception ==
Sheri Linden of The Hollywood Reporter and Tim Grierson of Screen International noted on Bishara's contribution among other crew members, being "essential to the film's dark power" and "give the proceedings a stately but tense vibe". Katie Tarrant of The Sound Architect wrote "the work [Joseph Bishara] has produced for The Conjuring 2 absolutely supersedes expectations in terms of manipulating emotion, supporting the narrative and adding another dimension to the on-screen tension that really helped to gel the film's events together." Marc Savlov of The Austin Chronicle wrote "Wan regular Joseph Bishara helps the proceedings immensely with a restless and occasionally appropriately jarring score that, on the whole, is more ominous than anything else in the film." Owen Gleiberman of Variety found the music to be "punishingly loud". Chris Alexander of ComingSoon.net wrote "gelling it all together is Joseph Bishara's effective score, one that maintains the movie's aggressive momentum. It's a moody and broody score but it's never overpowering." Shubir Rishi of Rediff.com wrote "the sound design by Joseph Bishara (who also worked on the original and in other minor gems such as Insidious), really does send a shiver up your spine." Mihir Fadnavis of Firstpost called it "spine chilling".

== Track listing ==
No.	Title	Length
1.	"Enfield Opening"	0:45
2.	"As Close to Hell"	3:31
3.	"The Conjuring 2"	0:45
4.	"It Isn't Real"	0:44
5.	"Tented Entity"	2:18
6.	"Asserted Presence"	2:31
7.	"Jarred Awake"	3:20
8.	"House Search"	1:15
9.	"Nun Painting"	2:41
10.	"Old Man Bill"	1:02
11.	"From the Grave"	3:57
12.	"Crooked Moving"	1:28
13.	"Taped Voices"	1:01
14.	"Cross Room"	0:58
15.	"Psychic Sharing"	3:26
16.	"Not a Heaven Man"	3:33
17.	"Ceiling Teleportation"	1:39
18.	"Submerged Entity"	1:45
19.	"Changes Everything"	1:18
20.	"Help It Let Go"	1:49
21.	"Dual Levitation"	0:52
22.	"Souls Cast Out"	2:00
23.	"Trapped Apart"	2:23
24.	"What's Your Name"	1:11
25.	"Book Inscribed"	0:50
26.	"Crooked Face"	0:29
27.	"Demon Called"	2:11
28.	"She's Alive"	0:59
29.	"Crooked Man Rhyme"	0:52
30.	"Soaring Phenomena"	1:52
Total length:		53:25

== Personnel credits ==
Credits adapted from WaterTower Music:

- Music composer and producer – Joseph Bishara
- Recording – Chris Spilfogel, Fernando Morales Franchini
- Mixing – Chris Spilfogel
- Mastering – Dave Collins
- Music editor – Julie Pearce, Lisé Richardson
- Music supervisor – Dana Sano
- Score coordinator – Celeste Chada
- Soundtrack coordinator – Kim Baum
- Copyist – Eric Stonerook
- Music preparation – Jill Streater Music Ltd.
- Art direction – Sandeep Sriram
- Music business affairs executive – Lisa Margolis, Ray Gonzalez
- Executive in charge of music (New Line Cinema) – Erin Scully
- Executive in charge of soundtracks (WaterTower Music) – Jason Linn

Orchestra

- Orchestra – Hollywood Studio Symphony
- Orchestrator – Dana Niu
- Conductor – Joseph Bishara
- Orchestra contractor – Ashley K. Olauson, Peter Rotter
- Concertmaster – Daphne Chen
- Bassoon – Anthony Parnther
- Cello – Alisha Bauer, Armen Ksajikian, Dennis Karmazyn, George Kim Scholes, Jacob Braun, Steve Erdody, Timothy Loo, Xiaodan Zheng, Richard Dodd
- Clarinet – Phil O'Connor, Stuart Clark
- Contrabass – Bart Samolis, David Parmeter, Drew Dembowski, Edward Meares, Michael Valerio, Stephanie N. Payne, Stephen Dress, Nico Carmine Abondolo
- Flute – Sara Andon
- Harp – JoAnn Turovsky
- Horn – Katelyn Faraudo, Laura Brenes, Stephanie Stetson, Steven Becknell, Teag Reaves, Amy Rhine, Mark Adams
- Oboe – Jennifer R. Johnson
- Percussion – Cory Hills, Justin DeHart, Matthew H. Cook, Nicholas J. Terry
- Piano – Vicki Ray
- Trombone – Alan Kaplan, William Reichenbach, Craig Gosnell, Michael M. Hoffman, Phillip Keen, Steven Suminski, Steven Trapani, Steven Holtman, William Booth, lexander Iles
- Trumpet – Christopher Still, James Wilt, Jon Lewis, Thomas Hooten
- Tuba – Philip Blake Cooper, Gary Hickman, Lukas Storm, Doug Tornquist
- Viola – Aaron Oltman, Alma Fernandez, Andrew Duckles, John Zach Dellinger, Luke Maurer, Matthew Funes, Meredith Crawford, Robert A. Brophy, Shawn Mann, Lauren Chipman
- Violin – Alyssa Park, Andrew Bulbrook, Benjamin Jacobson, Charlie Bisharat, Darius Campo, Eliza James Chorley, Eric Gorfain, Erik Arvinder, Helen Nightengale, Irina Voloshina, Jessica Guideri, Josefina Vergara, Katia Popov, Kevin Connolly, Lisa Liu, Lisa Sutton, Maya Magub, Natalie Leggett, Phillip Levy, Rafael Rishik, Sarah Thornblade, Serena McKinney, Songa Lee, Tamara Hatwan, Tereza Stanislav, Bruce Dukov

Choir

- Choir – London Voices, Brompton Oratory Choir
- Choirmaster – Ben Parry, Terry Edwards, Charles Cole
- Choir contractor – Isobel Griffiths
- Assistant choir contractor – Jo Changer
- Vocal contractor – Jasper Randall
- Choir recording – Andrew Dudman
- Tenor vocals – Benedict Hymas
- Soprano vocals – Elyse Willis, Holly Sedillos, Kirsten Ashley Wiest
