= Ty Simpkins =

American actor (born 2001)

- Born: Ty Keegan Simpkins; August 6, 2001 (age 25); New York City, U.S.
- Education: San Diego State University
- Occupation: Actor
- Years active: 2001–present
- Relatives: Ryan Simpkins (sister)

Ty Keegan Simpkins (born August 6, 2001) is an American actor. His notable film credits include Insidious (2010), its sequel Insidious: Chapter 2 (2013), Jurassic World (2015), and Insidious: The Red Door (2023). He is also known for his appearances in the Marvel Cinematic Universe as Harley Keener in Iron Man 3 (2013) and Avengers: Endgame (2019), as well as the independent film The Whale (2022).

== Early life ==
Simpkins was born on August 6, 2001 in New York City, to Monique and Stephen Simpkins. His older sibling is actress Ryan Simpkins.

== Acting career ==
Simpkins first appeared on TV when he was three weeks old. His first role was on One Life to Live where he shared the recurring role as John "Jack" Cramer Manning. Simpkins then had a recurring role as Jude Cooper Bauer on Guiding Light, in which he went on to be "Jude" for about four years. He guest starred in Law & Order: Criminal Intent and a handful of commercials and print ads.

Simpkins made his film debut in Steven Spielberg's War of the Worlds (2005). Next was a featured role in All the King's Men (2006), where he played a young version of Jude Law's character, and he played Aaron in the multiple-award-winning Little Children (2006). Simpkins went on to film Pride and Glory (2008), in which he and his sibling, actor Ryan Simpkins, play the children of Colin Farrell. Simpkins also completed Gardens of the Night (2008) and then Revolutionary Road (2008), in which he again starred alongside his real-life sibling Ryan. Simpkins has guest-starred on CSI, Private Practice and Family of Four. In September 2009, he signed on to play Luke in the 2010 film The Next Three Days. He also played Dalton Lambert in Insidious (2011) and Insidious: Chapter 2 (2013). He reprised the role ten years later for Insidious: The Red Door (2023).

In 2013, Simpkins starred alongside Robert Downey Jr. in the live-action film Iron Man 3, as Tony Stark's sidekick Harley Keener (he also reprises the role in Lego Marvel's Avengers). This was the first time a child character had been featured prominently in the Iron Man films. He appeared in Iron Man 3 director Shane Black's 2016 film, The Nice Guys.

In 2019, he reprised the role of Harley Keener in a cameo during Stark's funeral at the end of the film Avengers: Endgame. Simpkins later revealed that he had to keep Stark's death, and his own cameo, a secret for two years.

Simpkins starred in the 2015 blockbuster Jurassic World, and he appeared as Adam in Meadowland.

Simpkins played a Christian missionary called Thomas in Darren Aronofsky's Oscar-winning The Whale (2022).

== Filmography ==
=== Film ===
Key
†	Denotes works that have not yet been released

Year	Title	Role	Notes
2005	War of the Worlds	3 Year Old Boy	
2006	Little Children	Aaron Adamson	
2008	Gardens of the Night	Dylan Whitehead	
2008	Pride and Glory	Matthew Egan	
2008	Revolutionary Road	Michael Wheeler	
2009	Family of Four	Tommy Baker	
2009	Abracadabra	Tucker	Short film
2010	The Next Three Days	Luke Brennan	
2010	Insidious	Dalton Lambert	
2012	Arcadia	Nat	
2012	Extracted	Young Anthony	
2013	Iron Man 3	Harley Keener	
2013	Insidious: Chapter 2	Dalton Lambert	
2015	Hangman	Max Miller	
2015	Meadowland	Adam	
2015	Jurassic World	Gray Mitchell	
2015	Barbados	Gary	Short film
2016	The Nice Guys	Bobby	
2018	Insidious: The Last Key	Dalton Lambert	Archive footage
2019	Avengers: Endgame	Harley Keener	Cameo appearance
2019	Summer Lightning	Philip Olson	Short film
2021	Where's Rose	Eric Daniels	
2022	The Whale	Thomas	
2023	Insidious: The Red Door	Dalton Lambert	
2023	The Re-Education of Molly Singer	Elliot	
2026	The Isolate Thief †		

=== Television ===
Year	Title	Role	Notes
2001–2002	One Life to Live	Jack Manning	4 episodes
2001–2005	Guiding Light	Jude Cooper Bauer	47 episodes
2005	Law & Order: Criminal Intent	Jake Nikos	Episode: "Ex Stasis"
2008	CSI: Crime Scene Investigation	Tyler Waldrip	Episode: "A Thousand Days on Earth"
2008	Private Practice	Braden Tisch	Episode: "Past Tense"
2016	Family Guy	Little Drummer Boy	Episode: "How the Griffin Stole Christmas"
2019	Chimerica	Young Lee Berger	Episode: "Kodak Ergo Sum"
2021	Doogie Kameāloha, M.D.	Anthony	Episode: "Talk-Story"

=== Video games ===
Year	Title	Role	Notes
2015	Lego Jurassic World	Gray Mitchell	Voice
2015	Lego Dimensions	Gray Mitchell	Voice

=== Theater ===
Year	Title	Role	Notes
2018	Cabaret	Ernst	Debatable Productions
2019	Annie	Rooster	

== Awards and nominations ==
Year	Award	Category	Work	Result
2014	Saturn Award	Best Performance by a Younger Actor	Iron Man 3	Nominated
2016	Saturn Award	Best Performance by a Younger Actor	Jurassic World	Won
2016	Young Artist Awards	Best Performance in a Feature Film – Leading Young Actor (11 – 13)	Jurassic World	Nominated
2016	Young Entertainer Awards	Best Younger Actor	Jurassic World	Nominated
2018	Broadway World Los Angeles Awards	Best Supporting Actor	Cabaret	Nominated
