= American Insurrection =

- Poster
- Directed by: William Sullivan
- Written by: William Sullivan; Jarret Kerr
- Produced by: Jess Weiss; Sarah Wharton; Brandon Roots; William Sullivan; Jarret Kerr
- Starring: Michael Raymond-James; Brandon Perea; Toby Leonard Moore
- Cinematography: Brandon Roots
- Edited by: Casey O’Donnell
- Music by: Nathan Matthew David
- Distributed by: Saban Films
- Release date: October 8, 2021
- Running time: 115 minutes
- Country: United States
- Language: English

American Insurrection is a 2021 American drama film written by William Sullivan and Jarret Kerr, directed by Sullivan and featuring Michael Raymond-James, Brandon Perea, and Toby Leonard Moore.

== Plot ==
Four people, a couple (Sarah & Jarret) & their two friends (David & Zabi - a Muslim woman), are trying to escape the United States after a Right-wing militia group ("the Volunteers") takes over. The Volunteer movement that's in charge of the United States has gradually tattooed the necks of people that are Muslim, LGBTQ+, undocumented immigrants etc. after a national census. The Volunteers are mostly white Christian males that roam the countryside looking for "unwanted" people and man roadblocks where passers by are checked for their papers and/or neck tattoo marks. Sarah has a history of helping unwanted people escape the United States for Canada and is now trying to help her own friends to cross the heavily patrolled international border in a wooded area. The group is staying at a Volunteer's (Gabe - referred to as "the dog") farm, who they keep chained in his own barn, while the group awaits radio contact from Canada. While returning from a run for supplies, Sarah comes upon a Volunteer checkpoint that is assaulting a gay male (Arjay) who's been branded with a neck tattoo. After saving his life, Sarah takes Arjay back to the farm, where he is nursed back to health by David, who is a nurse. After a night of drinking alcohol, Arjay & David kiss while David, who has been living a secret closeted lifestyle, is drunk. Flashbacks reveal how the film's characters have been shaped by the Volunteer takeover, and over time, further dialogue is had and secrets are eventually revealed which will change the dynamic within the group as the Volunteers start to eliminate any unwanted people that they come across while they are hunting for Arjay.

== Cast ==
- Michael Raymond-James as Gabe
- Nadine Malouf as Zabi
- Nick Westrate as David
- Brandon Perea as Arjay
- Sarah Wharton as Sarah
- Jarret Kerr as Jarret
- Toby Leonard Moore as The Founder

== Release ==
The film was released in theaters on October 8, 2021. Then it was released on digital, on demand and on DVD on December 7, 2021.

== Reception ==
On the review aggregator website Rotten Tomatoes, 83% of 12 critics' reviews are positive, with an average rating of 5.6/10.

Joe Leydon of Variety gave the film a positive review and wrote, "the well-cast lead actors infuse their characters with a persuasive and compelling sense of urgency, greatly enhancing the stretches of worst-case scenario suspense."
