= Insidious: The Red Door =

2023 film by Patrick Wilson

- Theatrical release poster
- Directed by: Patrick Wilson
- Screenplay by: Scott Teems
- Story by: Leigh Whannell; Scott Teems
- Based on: Characters by Leigh Whannell
- Produced by: Jason Blum; Oren Peli; James Wan; Leigh Whannell
- Starring: Ty Simpkins; Patrick Wilson; Sinclair Daniel; Hiam Abbass; Rose Byrne
- Cinematography: Autumn Eakin
- Edited by: Derek Ambrosi; Michel Aller
- Music by: Joseph Bishara
- Production companies: Screen Gems; Stage 6 Films; Blumhouse Productions
- Distributed by: Sony Pictures Releasing
- Release dates: June 27, 2023 (New York); July 7, 2023 (United States)
- Running time: 107 minutes
- Country: United States
- Language: English
- Budget: $16 million
- Box office: $189.1 million

Insidious: The Red Door is a 2023 American supernatural horror film directed by Patrick Wilson (in his directorial debut) from a screenplay by Scott Teems based on a story by Leigh Whannell and Teems. Produced by Screen Gems and Blumhouse in association with Stage 6, it is a direct sequel to Insidious: Chapter 2 (2013), and the fifth installment in the Insidious franchise. Original director James Wan serves as a producer, as does Jason Blum through his Blumhouse Productions banner. Wilson, Ty Simpkins, Rose Byrne, Andrew Astor, Steve Coulter, Joseph Bishara, Whannell, Angus Sampson, and Lin Shaye reprise their roles from previous films. Sinclair Daniel and Hiam Abbass join the cast.

After the release of Insidious: The Last Key in 2018, Blumhouse opted for possibilities to produce future films in the series, including a crossover with the Sinister series. In October 2020, the studio announced that Wilson would direct and star in the new film, with Teems writing the script based on a story written with Whannell. With a production budget of $16 million, filming took place in August 2022 at the Morris County and Madison locations around Jersey City.

Insidious: The Red Door premiered in New York on June 27, 2023, and was theatrically released in the United States by Sony Pictures Releasing on July 7, 2023. The film received mixed reviews from critics and grossed over $189 million worldwide, becoming the highest-grossing film of the series. It was nominated for Best Horror Film at the 51st Saturn Awards.

== Plot ==
In 2019, nine years after his possession (Note: As depicted in Insidious: Chapter 2 (2013).), Josh Lambert's memories of his experience in The Further have been repressed. He is divorced from his wife Renai and his mother Lorraine has recently died. His relationship with his son Dalton who is now 19, has become strained and unpleasant, and he attempts to heal things between them while dropping him off at college but ends with them in a conflict.

In his first art class, Dalton ends up drawing a picture of the red door used to enter The Further. Meanwhile, Josh begins being haunted by the spirit of a man, eventually discovering that it is his father Ben Burton who he believed abandoned his family when he was young. Dalton attends a frat party with his roommate Chris, where he sees the ghost of a student who is constantly vomiting. After accidentally going into The Further again, Chris shows Dalton a YouTube video by Specs and Tucker, explaining how astral projection works, which leads to a clip of Elise Rainier talking about The Further.

Dalton attempts to astral project again while Chris watches over his body. Chris is then attacked by an unseen entity and her screams alert Dalton, who rushes back to his body and sees that it is the red-faced demon that tormented him as a child. After being warned by Chris to stop using his abilities, Dalton calls his brother, Foster, who tells about a recurring dream he used to have of Josh trying to kill them. This spurs Dalton's memory and he finishes his painting, which shows a possessed Josh in front of the red door. A distressed Dalton is pulled into The Further, back to when a possessed Josh attacked them in the basement. He tackles Josh as Josh attempts to kill the younger Dalton and ends up transported back to the lair of the red-faced demon.

Josh begins researching his father and discovers that he killed himself while institutionalized in a mental hospital. He talks to Renai, who reveals the truth about what happened to their family a decade ago and that his father also had the ability to astral project but believed the things he saw were a result of mental illness. Foster shows them a photo of Dalton's painting he texted and they realize Dalton is in danger. Renai helps Josh to go back into The Further to rescue their son.

With Dalton trapped in his lair, the demon possesses his body and attempts to kill Chris but is stopped when Josh manages to find and free Dalton. The demon chases them to the red door and Josh stays behind to keep it shut so Dalton will be safe. Dalton returns to his body and paints over his red door painting with black paint, which in turn seals the real door and The Further.

Josh meets his father's spirit, who guides him back to the living world. Once back, Josh agrees to have dinner with Renai and the kids, hinting at a possible reunion. As he leaves, he unknowingly meets Elise's spirit, who tells him that he has a bright future ahead of him. Josh then drives to Dalton's college, where father and son reconcile as Dalton reveals a painting of Josh carrying a young Dalton out of The Further.

In a post-credits scene, the light over the sealed door to The Further flickers back on.

== Cast ==
- Ty Simpkins as Dalton Lambert
- Patrick Wilson as Josh Lambert
- Rose Byrne as Renai Lambert
- Sinclair Daniel as Chris Winslow
- Hiam Abbass as Professor Armagan
- Andrew Astor as Foster Lambert
- Juliana Davies as Kali Lambert
- Steve Coulter as Carl
- Peter Dager as Nick the Dick
- Justin Sturgis as Alec Anderson
- Joseph Bishara as the Lipstick-Face Demon
- David Call as Smash Face / Ben Burton
- Leigh Whannell as Specs
- Angus Sampson as Tucker
- Lin Shaye as Elise Rainier
- Dagmara Domińczyk as Priest Voice

== Production ==
=== Development ===
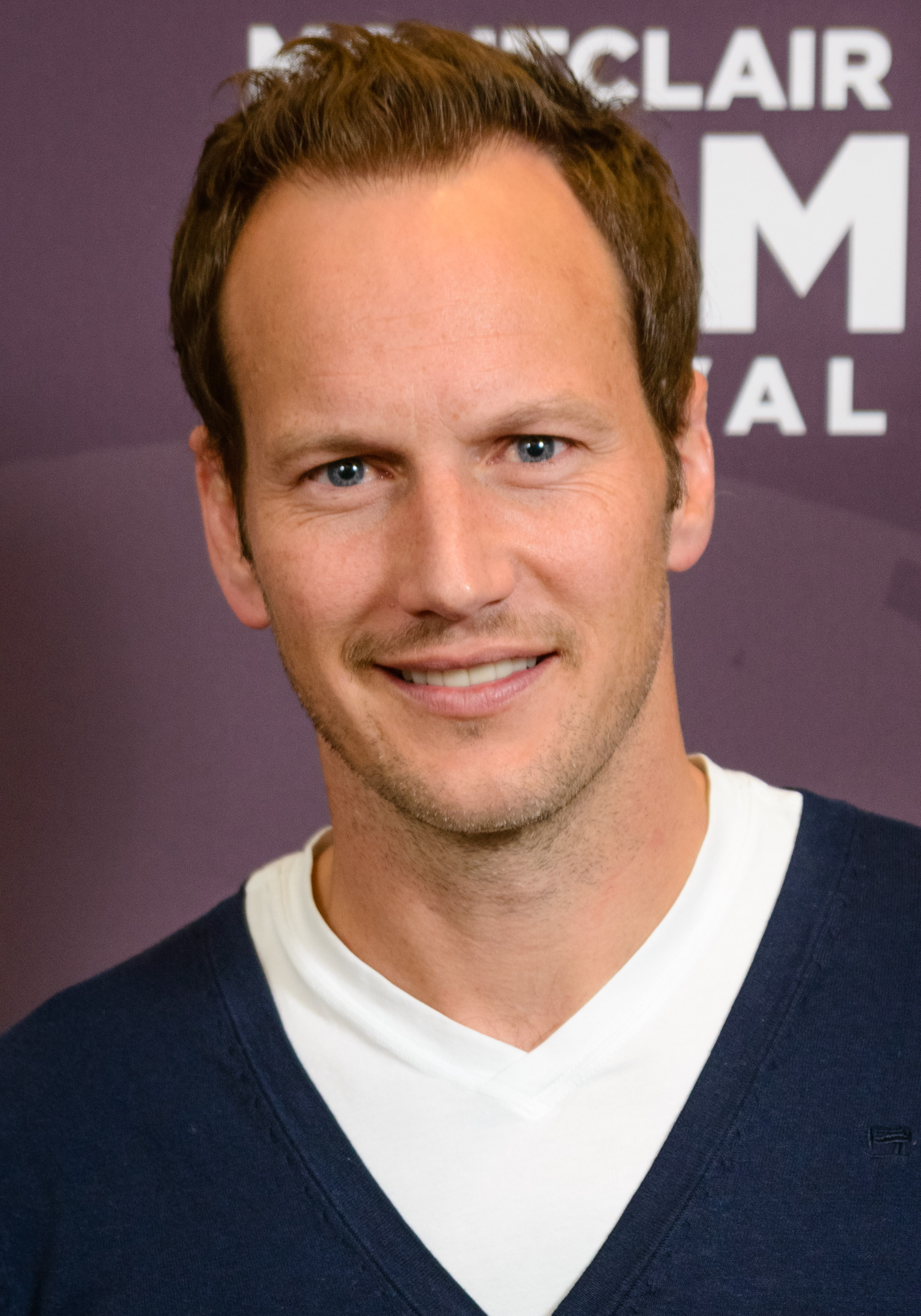
Insidious: The Red Door is the feature directorial debut of Patrick Wilson, who portrays Josh Lambert in the franchise.

Following the release and box office success of Insidious: The Last Key, a sequel entered development. Producer Jason Blum had expressed interest in a crossover film with Sinister. On October 29, 2020, it was announced that a direct sequel to Insidious and Insidious: Chapter 2 was in development with Patrick Wilson serving as director in his directorial debut from a screenplay written by Scott Teems based on a story by Leigh Whannell. Wilson and Ty Simpkins were set to reprise their roles from the first two films.

=== Filming ===
In February 2022, Wilson confirmed that location scouting had begun with filming set to begin in the spring of that year. Principal photography commenced in August 2022, with Peter Dager, Jarquez McClendon, Sinclair Daniel, and Hiam Abbass joining the cast, as well as Rose Byrne confirmed to be returning. In February 2023, Andrew Astor was confirmed to reprise his role as Foster Lambert. In April 2023, Lin Shaye was confirmed to reprise her role as Elise Rainier. Filming took place in Morris County, New Jersey, including in Morristown, Chatham, Florham Park, and at Drew University and other locations in Madison. On August 22, 2022, Wilson revealed that filming had wrapped.

== Music ==
The film's score is composed by Joseph Bishara, who returned to the franchise after composing the first four films in the series. The score soundtrack was being released on July 7, by Madison Gate Records. Ghost contributed a cover of the Shakespears Sister song "Stay." Patrick Wilson's vocals are also on the track. It features during the closing credits.

== Release ==
Insidious: The Red Door premiered on June 27, 2023 at Metrograph in New York, and was theatrically released in the United States on July 7, 2023, by Sony Pictures Releasing.

The film was released on digital platforms on August 1, followed by a Blu-ray and DVD release on September 26.

== Reception ==
=== Box office ===
Insidious: The Red Door grossed $82.2 million in the United States and Canada, and $106.9 million in other territories, for a worldwide gross of $189.1 million. Deadline Hollywood calculated the net profit of the film to be $92 million, when factoring together all expenses and revenues.

In the United States and Canada, Insidious: The Red Door was released alongside Joy Ride, and was initially projected to gross $18–23 million from 3,188 theaters in its opening weekend. After making $15.3 million on its first day (including $5 million from Thursday night previews), estimates were raised to $31 million. It went on to debut to $33 million, topping the box office and marking the second-best opening weekend in the franchise behind Chapter 2 ($41 million in 2013). In its second weekend, the film made $13 million, dropping 61% and finishing third behind newcomer Mission: Impossible – Dead Reckoning Part One and holdover Sound of Freedom. It then made $6.5 million in its third weekend, falling to sixth place.

In the Philippines, a market where the horror genre is widely popular, Insidious: The Red Door broke the records for the highest-grossing opening weekend for a horror film, the highest-grossing opening weekend of 2023, and the highest-grossing horror film of all time (with $6.9 million, surpassing The Nun).

=== Critical response ===
On the review aggregator website Rotten Tomatoes, 39% of 118 critics' reviews are positive, with an average rating of 5/10. The website's consensus reads: "Earlier installments have had their moments, but behind Insidious: The Red Door lies the disappointing denouement of a once-frightening franchise." Metacritic, which uses a weighted average, assigned the film a score of 45 out of 100, based on 23 critics, indicating "mixed or average" reviews. Audiences polled by CinemaScore gave the film an average grade of "C+" on an A+ to F scale, while PostTrak reported 72% of filmgoers gave it a positive score.

Owen Gleiberman from Variety gave the film a negative review saying, "For a first-time director, Patrick Wilson doesn't do a bad job, but he's working with tropes that have already been worked to death. It's time to close this carnival of souls down". Meagan Navarro writing for Bloody Disgusting felt the film gave a satisfying closure to the series. She explained, "Those hoping to learn more about the Lipstick Demon and the darkest corners of the Further may come away disappointed. The Red Door isn’t interested in the mythology but instead in examining how its ghosts fractured the family and whether their enduring love can make them whole again. Wilson reminds audiences why they fell for the Lambert family in the first place with a sentimental sequel that tenderly bids them farewell. While it doesn't give a sense of finality to the Further or its ghostly inhabitants, it does offer poignant closure to the protagonists that started it all".

== Sequel ==
In May 2024, a sixth Insidious film, which was later revealed to be titled Insidious: Out of the Further was announced to be in development, from Sony Pictures. The film was originally scheduled to be released on August 29, 2025, but was removed from the release schedule in December 2024, and rescheduled for August 21, 2026 the following year. On September 12, 2025, Lin Shaye and Amelia Eve were announced to headline the cast while Jacob Chase would direct and co-write the movie with David Leslie Johnson. Filming began three days later in Australia.
