= Insidious: Chapter 2 =

2013 film by James Wan

- Theatrical release poster
- Directed by: James Wan
- Screenplay by: Leigh Whannell
- Story by: James Wan; Leigh Whannell
- Produced by: Jason Blum; Oren Peli
- Starring: Patrick Wilson; Rose Byrne; Lin Shaye; Ty Simpkins; Barbara Hershey
- Cinematography: John R. Leonetti
- Edited by: Kirk Morri
- Music by: Joseph Bishara
- Production companies: FilmDistrict; Stage 6 Films; Entertainment One; Blumhouse Productions; Oren Peli
- Distributed by: FilmDistrict (Note: Distribution of Insidious for all media was split between FilmDistrict and Sony Pictures Releasing. While FilmDistrict handled the United States theatrical distribution rights, Sony Pictures handled some international theatrical, worldwide television and some home video distribution rights to the film.)
- Release date: September 13, 2013
- Running time: 106 minutes
- Country: United States
- Language: English
- Budget: $5 million
- Box office: $161.9 million

Insidious: Chapter 2 is a 2013 American supernatural horror film directed by James Wan. It is the sequel to Insidious (2010), and the second installment in the Insidious franchise, and the fourth in terms of the series' in-story chronology. The film stars Patrick Wilson and Rose Byrne, reprising their roles as Josh and Renai Lambert, a husband and wife who seek to uncover the secret that has left them dangerously connected to the spirit world. The film was released on September 13, 2013.

Two prequels, Chapter 3 and The Last Key were released on June 5, 2015, and January 5, 2018, respectively, with a direct sequel to Chapter 2, The Red Door, released on July 7, 2023.

== Plot ==
In 1986, Lorraine Lambert summons demonologist Elise Rainier to help her son Josh, who is being haunted by the spirit of an old woman in a black bridal gown. While searching for paranormal phenomena in their home, Elise's arm is slashed by an unseen force. She insists that they must suppress Josh's astral projection abilities for his own safety and plant altered memories in his brain.

24 years later, Josh's wife, Renai Lambert, is questioned by a detective about the death of Elise (Note: As depicted in Insidious (2010).). She, Josh, and their children – Dalton, Foster, and Kali – temporarily relocate to Lorraine's house, where the paranormal events continue. Dalton tells his mother that he has been having nightmares about a woman in a white dress and hears Josh talking to an unseen figure. Renai receives a call from the police stating that the forensic evidence does not prove that Josh murdered Elise before being attacked by a ghostly woman in a white dress. Josh hears a voice urging him to kill his family.

Specs and Tucker, Elise's former associates, show Lorraine a videotape of the 1986 investigation; the enhanced footage reveals an adult Josh standing behind his younger self. They contact Elise's former colleague, Carl, who attempts to contact Elise's spirit. They are instructed to find answers at an abandoned hospital, where Lorraine used to work as a physician. Lorraine recounts the story of a patient named Parker Crane who, twenty-four years ago, had assaulted a then-young Josh. She saw Parker out of bed some days later and was informed by a nurse that he had jumped to his death the day before. The group then goes to the Crane family home, where Lorraine is attacked by the spirit of Parker's mother, Michelle, who calls herself "Mother Mortis"; she is the spirit Carl had summoned and mistakenly believed to be Elise. The group finds a secret room containing numerous corpses, a black wedding gown, and newspaper clippings, leading them to discover that Parker had been a serial killer known as "The Bride in Black", who abducted and murdered fifteen women while dressed as a woman himself at the behest of his mother's spirit.

Renai and Lorraine realize Josh is possessed as his body begins to slowly deteriorate. Carl, Specs, and Tucker arrive to drug him, but he incapacitates them after a struggle. Carl awakens in the spirit realm of "The Further", where he meets the spirits of the real Josh and Elise. Time moves non-chronologically in The Further, allowing Josh to communicate with his younger self to locate Parker's house.

Meanwhile, in the physical world, the possessed Josh attacks his family, locking Lorraine in a closet and attempting to kill Renai, Dalton, and Foster, who flee to the basement. Dalton voluntarily enters The Further to help his father. There, Josh and the others find Parker's house, where they witness Michelle abusing him and forcing him to act like a girl. Elise appears to destroy Michelle's spirit, which stops the possessed Josh from murdering his family in the real world. Dalton leads Josh and Carl back to the living world, allowing Josh to finally regain control of his body. After the ordeal, Josh and Dalton once again have their memories suppressed by Carl.

Some time after, Specs and Tucker arrive at the house of a family whose daughter, Allison, is in an inexplicable coma. Elise's spirit, whom only Allison's younger sister can see, passes between them and enters Allison's room. There, Elise encounters an unseen figure behind Allison as a creaking sound is heard. The film ends with Elise gasping and saying, "Oh my god".

== Cast ==
- Rose Byrne as Renai Lambert
- Patrick Wilson as Josh Lambert
  - Garrett Ryan as young Josh
- Ty Simpkins as Dalton Lambert
- Lin Shaye as Elise Rainier
  - Lindsay Seim as young Elise
- Steve Coulter as Carl
  - Hank Harris as young Carl
- Barbara Hershey as Lorraine Lambert
  - Jocelin Donahue as young Lorraine
- Leigh Whannell as Specs
- Angus Sampson as Tucker
- Andrew Astor as Foster Lambert
- Danielle Bisutti as Michelle Crane / Mother Mortis
- Tom Fitzpatrick as Old Parker / Bride in Black
  - Tyler James Griffin as young Parker
- Michael Beach as Detective Sendal
- J. LaRose as Long Haired Fiend
- Edwina Findley as Front Desk Nurse Hillary
- Stephanie Pearson as Dark-haired woman
- Jorge Pallo as Brian
- Priscilla Garita as Natalie
- Jenna Ortega as Annie

== Production ==
=== Development ===
It's a direct continuation from the end of the first film, so it's the same characters, same actors coming back. But where the first movie plays like a classic haunted house film, the second one plays more like a domestic thriller with supernatural elements to it.

— Wan, on the shift in genre

After the financial success of Insidious In April 2011, discussions for a sequel soon followed. With producer Jason Blum insisting on the return of director James Wan and screenwriter Leigh Whannell, a treatment script did not arrive until nearly a year later. "As long as there was a chance that James and Leigh were gonna write the second movie and direct the second movie, I didn't want to do it with someone else," said Blum. "They kept saying they might do it, they might not do it, which was why there's quite a bit of time between the two movies." On February 2, 2012, it was announced that director James Wan and screenwriter Leigh Whannell were in talks to return for the sequel.

While promoting The Conjuring (2013) at New York Comic Con in October 2012, Wan described how he and Whannell were working closely on developing the story and the script for the follow-up to Insidious, explaining to ShockTilYouDrop.com, "I think the sequel to Insidious is kind of my reaction to Saw where for my own reason I wasn't as involved in the sequels, and so I felt with Insidious, think it would be good to shepherd it and keep it more in track to the version I had when I made the first film so that it doesn't detour too far."

The film was titled Insidious: Chapter 2 because it is a direct continuation of the first installment. However, the tone of the film was to be more grounded than in the first film, with Wan citing his work on The Conjuring as an influence to how he and Whannell approached Insidious: Chapter 2. "I pulled things from Insidious that I applied to The Conjuring, and what I learned from The Conjuring I applied to Insidious 2," said Wan. "So for me, I feel like it's a cumulative filmmaking experience that I've gathered over the years."

=== Casting ===
On November 19, 2012, it was officially announced that Patrick Wilson, Rose Byrne, Lin Shaye, and Ty Simpkins would reprise their roles from the first film. The following month, it was announced that Barbara Hershey would also be returning. In February 2013, Jocelin Donahue and Lindsay Seim rounded out the cast as younger versions of Hershey and Shaye's characters, respectively. It was also confirmed that the film's screenwriter Leigh Whannell and actor Angus Sampson would reprise their roles as Specs and Tucker, respectively. When asked about the return of the two characters, Whannell explained, "There was this hatred that spewed out from fans saying 'I hated those guys! They sucked! They ruined the movie!' so there will probably be a lot of people out there who will be disappointed to hear that the Specs and Tucker characters will be coming back."

=== Filming ===
Principal photography for Insidious: Chapter 2 began on January 15, 2013, in Los Angeles. Having a slightly higher production budget than its predecessor, the film was captured over the course of 25 shooting days. A bulk of the film was shot at a house in Highland Park, Los Angeles, which served as the location of Lorraine Lambert's house. Another location used for filming was the former Linda Vista Community Hospital, which was redressed as a hospital setting and used for the construction of interior sets (including recreations of sets from the first film). "I've never shot in Linda Vista," said Wan about the location. "It's kind of funny because Leigh and I have always heard so much about it. For research on the first one [Leigh] came here to do a bit of ghost-hunting. And I think a lot of that inspired us when we needed a hospital set."

=== Music ===
The musical score to Insidious: Chapter 2 is composed by Joseph Bishara, who previously collaborated with director James Wan on the first installment as well as The Conjuring. A soundtrack album for the film was released digitally on September 15 and in physical forms on October 8, 2013, by Void Recordings.

== Distribution ==
=== Marketing ===
In April 2013, the first promotional poster for the film went on display at CinemaCon in Las Vegas. The first theatrical trailer for the film was screened to a live audience on location at the Linda Vista Community Hospital on June 4, 2013, with an online release the following day. On August 10, 2013, it was announced at the convention Scare L.A by producer Jason Blum and Universal's creative director John Murdy, that a maze attraction entitled "Insidious: Into the Further" will be featured at the 2013 Halloween Horror Nights at Universal Studios Hollywood.

=== Theatrical release ===
While originally intended to be released on August 30, 2013, Insidious: Chapter 2 was rescheduled for a September 20 release date. The film's release date was later moved again to September 13, 2013.

On the night prior to its theatrical wide release, the film was shown in select theatres as part of a double feature with the first installment. A red carpet premiere for the film was held in Los Angeles on September 10, 2013.

== Release ==
=== Box office ===
In the United States and Canada, the film was projected to gross $32–35 million in its opening weekend. It earned $1.5 million from its Thursday night showings, and $20 million Friday, making it the biggest opening day in September box office history. It went on to debut number one, taking in $41 million at the box office. The film grossed a worldwide total of $161.9 million against a budget of $5 million.

=== Critical response ===
Review aggregate Rotten Tomatoes reports an approval rating of 38% based on 130 reviews, with an average rating of 4.8/10. The site's critics consensus reads: "Insidious: Chapter 2 is decidedly short on the tension and surprises that made its predecessor so chilling." Metacritic, another review aggregator, assigned the film a weighted average score of 40 out of 100 based on 30 critics, indicating "mixed or average reviews." Audiences polled by CinemaScore gave the film an average grade of "B+" on an A+ to F scale.

Robbie Collin of The Telegraph gave the film a positive review, stating that "the scares are mostly very scary indeed, and that means the film does its job." Scott Foundas of Variety praised the "artfully eerie" cinematography work of John R. Leonetti and the "pervasively unsettling atmosphere" constructed by sound designer and editor Joe Dzuban. Foundas further wrote that "where so many sequels seem like mere remakes of their predecessors, with bigger budgets and less imagination, Insidious: Chapter 2 feels like a genuine continuation of characters we enjoyed getting to know the first time around, and wouldn't at all mind returning to again." Conversely, Robert Abele of the Los Angeles Times commented, "After the pleasurable free fall into old-fashioned nightmare artistry that was last summer's The Conjuring, this busy-yet-dull sequel feels like Wan robotically flexing his manipulation of fright-film signposts, an exercise more silly than sinister." Justin Lowe of The Hollywood Reporter wrote, "Setting aside the movie's tediously lame dialogue, self-conscious performances and frequently predictable scares, the narrative's compulsively shifting chronology intermittently manages to engage, although it does little to obscure the distracting shortcomings of both plot and character development."

=== Home media ===
The film was released on Blu-ray and DVD on December 24, 2013.

== Future films ==
=== Prequels ===
On September 16, 2013, a third film in the series was announced, with Leigh Whannell signed on to return as writer while Jason Blum and Oren Peli were also set to produce. When asked about returning for another sequel, actor Patrick Wilson went on to say that he "[doesn't] know where else it could go," and that "[Josh Lambert has] been through the wringer, and I think the movie sets it up well at the end... And that's great, that's how it should end." On March 11, 2014, it was reported that the third film wouldn't focus on the Lambert family, but would focus on a new family and story, that it would not connect to the last teaser scene in the second film, and that Whannell and Sampson would not return as ghost hunters Specs and Tucker. On May 7, 2014, Wan tweeted that Whannell would be directing the third film, which would mark his directorial debut. Stefanie Scott and Dermot Mulroney starred in the film. Focus Features and Stage 6 Films released Insidious: Chapter 3 on June 5, 2015.

A fourth film, Insidious: The Last Key, was announced in May 2016. Whannell returned to write, with Blum, Peli, and Wan producing, as well as Shaye reprising her role as Elise Rainier and Adam Robitel directing. The film was released on January 5, 2018.

=== Sequel ===
In October 2020, it was announced that a direct sequel to Chapter 2 was in development. Patrick Wilson was announced as director, in addition to reprising his starring role, while Scott Teems serves as screenwriter, based on an original story by Whannell. The premise centers around a now-grown Dalton Lambert as he goes off to college, with Ty Simpkins reprising the role. Blum, Wan, Whannell, and Pelli again serve as producers. Insidious: The Red Door was produced by Blumhouse Productions and distributed by Sony Pictures, and was released on July 7, 2023.

== See also ==
- List of ghost films
