= Insidious (film) =

2010 film by James Wan

- Theatrical release poster
- Directed by: James Wan
- Written by: Leigh Whannell
- Produced by: Jason Blum; Steven Schneider; Oren Peli
- Starring: Patrick Wilson; Rose Byrne; Barbara Hershey
- Cinematography: John R. Leonetti; David M. Brewer
- Edited by: James Wan; Kirk Morri
- Music by: Joseph Bishara
- Production companies: Alliance Films; IM Global; Haunted Movies
- Distributed by: Alliance Films (Canada); FilmDistrict (United States) (Note: The U.S. distribution rights for Insidious were co-owned by FilmDistrict and Sony Pictures Worldwide Acquisitions; the latter released under their Stage 6 Films label. While FilmDistrict handled the theatrical distribution, Sony handled the home video distribution.); Momentum Pictures (United Kingdom)
- Release dates: September 14, 2010 (TIFF); April 1, 2011 (United States)
- Running time: 102 minutes
- Countries: Canada; United States; United Kingdom
- Language: English
- Budget: $1.5 million
- Box office: $100.1 million

Insidious is a 2010 supernatural horror film directed and co-edited by James Wan, written by Leigh Whannell, and starring Patrick Wilson, Rose Byrne, and Barbara Hershey. It is the first installment in the Insidious franchise and the third in terms of the series' in-story chronology. The story centers on a married couple whose young son inexplicably enters a comatose state and becomes a vessel for a variety of demonic entities in an astral plane.

Insidious had its world premiere on September 14, 2010, at the 2010 Toronto International Film Festival (TIFF) and received a wide theatrical release on April 1, 2011, by FilmDistrict. The film is followed by three sequels, Insidious: Chapter 2 (2013), Insidious: The Red Door (2023), Insidious: Out of the Further (2026); and two prequels, Insidious: Chapter 3 (2015) and Insidious: The Last Key (2018).

== Plot ==
Married couple Josh and Renai Lambert have recently moved in to a new home with their sons, Dalton and Foster, and their infant daughter Cali. One evening, Dalton sneaks into the attic, where he encounters a mysterious entity after falling from a rickety ladder and hitting his head. The next day, he inexplicably slips into a coma.

Three months later, with no signs of improvement, Renai and Josh take Dalton back home from the hospital. The family starts to experience frightening paranormal events, including strange noises and their home security alarm going off on its own repeatedly. Foster also claims he has seen the comatose Dalton walking around the house and Renai finds a bloody handprint on Dalton's bed. Later, Renai begins seeing a fiendish, long-haired apparition that tries to attack her. She believes the house is haunted, and the Lamberts decide to move.

However, the supernatural activity continues in their new home when Renai sees the ghost of a young child dressed in period attire. Josh's mother Lorraine arrives and explains she had a nightmare about a demon with a red face in Dalton's bedroom. She later sees the same demon behind Josh, and Dalton's bedroom is ransacked by unseen forces. Lorraine calls psychic Elise Rainier and her paranormal investigators Specs and Tucker. In Dalton's bedroom, Elise sees a vision of the red-faced demon.

Elise explains that Dalton is not in a coma; he was born with the ability to astral project his consciousness and had been unknowingly doing so in his sleep, believing he was simply dreaming. This time he has travelled too far and has been captured in a purgatory realm called "The Further," a place inhabited by the tortured spirits of the deceased. Without his consciousness present, his body is comatose, but spirits desire to use it so they can re-enter the physical world. Josh accuses Elise of being a scam artist and throws her out, but later finds drawings in Dalton's room that seem to confirm Elise's theory.

Josh brings Elise and her team back. After an attempted séance goes horribly wrong, Elise explains that she has known Lorraine for decades, and had previously helped Josh when he was a child. Josh also possesses the ability to astral project, but had suppressed his memory of it years ago with Elise's help, after she helped him beat the parasitic spirit of an evil old woman that wanted to possess him (Note: As depicted in Insidious: Chapter 2 (2013).). The only way to rescue Dalton is for Josh to go into The Further and save him.

Elise puts Josh in a hypnotic trance and he projects himself into The Further. He finds his way to Dalton, encountering multiple perilous and horrifying ghosts along the way. He frees his son, but they are chased and attacked by the red-faced demon while the spirits of The Further invade the real world to terrorize Renai, Elise, and the others. Josh is confronted by the old woman spirit that tormented him as a child. He tries once and for all to overcome his fear, and she appears to retreat from him. Josh and Dalton wake up in the real world and the invading spirits vanish.

The family celebrates their victory, believing that the nightmare is over. Elise senses that something is amiss about Josh. When she snaps a photo of him, Josh goes berserk and strangles her. Renai discovers Elise's corpse and sees the photograph she took. It reveals that Josh is now possessed by the ghost of the old woman from his childhood, who slipped into his body when he confronted her in The Further. Josh appears behind Renai and she lets out a frightened gasp.

== Cast ==
- Patrick Wilson as Josh Lambert
  - Josh Feldman as young Josh
- Rose Byrne as Renai Lambert
- Lin Shaye as Elise Rainier
- Ty Simpkins as Dalton Lambert
- Barbara Hershey as Lorraine Lambert
- Leigh Whannell as Specs
- Angus Sampson as Tucker
- Andrew Astor as Foster Lambert
- Joseph Bishara as Lipstick-Face Demon
- J. LaRose as Long Haired Fiend
- Ben Woolf as Dancing Boy

== Production ==
The film came as a result of the success of Wan's Saw series. Wan directed the first Saw film in 2004, and while he stated in an interview with Entertainment Weekly that he was "very proud" of the film, he also felt that the film, specifically, the violence and gore of it, put some people off and made them hesitant to work with him. Wan thus made Insidious in part to prove that he could make a film without the level of violence found in the Saw series.

=== Filming ===
Principal photography for Insidious was completed over the course of three weeks in 2010, from late April to mid-May at the historic Herald Examiner Building in downtown Los Angeles. In regards to the shorter shooting schedule, actor Patrick Wilson explained, "We had long days and a lot of pages a day, and we didn't get a lot of coverage or rehearsal. But luckily, the benefit of doing a movie that's not on a big budget—and the reason it's usually done like that—is so if the filmmakers feel like, 'OK, we're not going to sacrifice anything on screen,' which I don't think they have, it lets them have complete control. So we were in good hands."

=== Music ===
The musical score to Insidious was composed by Joseph Bishara, who also appears in the film as the demon. Performed with a quartet and a piano, a bulk of the score was improvised and structured in the editing process, although some recording sessions began prior to filming. On describing the approach of the film's soundtrack, director James Wan explained, "We wanted a lot of the scare sequences to play really silent. But, what I like to do with the soundtrack is set you on edge with a really loud, sort of like, atonal scratchy violin score, mixing with some really weird piano bangs and take that away and all of a sudden, you're like, 'What just happened there?'"

== Release ==
=== Theatrical run ===
Insidious had its world premiere in the Midnight Madness program at the Toronto International Film Festival on September 14, 2010. Less than 12 hours after its screening, the U.S distribution rights to the film and the worldwide distribution rights to any sequels were picked up by Sony Pictures Worldwide Acquisitions. On December 29, 2010, it was announced that the film would be released theatrically on April 1, 2011 by the then-relatively new film company FilmDistrict. The film was also screened at South by Southwest in mid-March 2011.

=== Home media ===
Insidious was released on DVD and Blu-ray on July 12, 2011 through Sony Pictures Home Entertainment. The Blu-ray bonus content includes three featurettes: Horror 101: The Exclusive Seminar, On Set With Insidious, and Insidious Entities. On the day prior to the film's home media release, Sony Pictures and Fangoria hosted a free screening of the film at the Silent Movie Theater in Los Angeles followed by an interactive Q&A with director James Wan and screenwriter Leigh Whannell.

== Reception ==
=== Box office ===
The film opened with $13.3 million, making it No. 3 at the US box office behind Hop and Source Code. On a budget of $1.5 million, it has since grossed a total of US$54 million in the US and $46.1 million internationally, for a total of $100.1 million worldwide.

=== Critical response ===
Review aggregate Rotten Tomatoes reports that 66% of critics have given the film a positive review based on 176 reviews; the average score is 6.00/10. The critical consensus is: "Aside from a shaky final act, Insidious is a very scary and very fun haunted house thrill ride." On Metacritic, the film has a weighted average score of 52 out of 100 based on 30 critics, indicating "mixed or average" reviews. Audiences polled by CinemaScore gave the film an average grade of "B" on an A+ to F scale.

Roger Ebert gave the film two-and-a-half stars out of four and wrote, "It depends on characters, atmosphere, sneaky happenings and mounting dread. This one is not terrifically good, but moviegoers will get what they're expecting."

A number of negative reviews reported that the second half of the film did not match the development of the first. Mike Hale of The New York Times wrote that "the strongest analogue for the second half of Insidious is one that the filmmakers probably weren't trying for: it feels like a less poetic version of an M. Night Shyamalan fairy tale." Similarly, James Berardinelli commented, "[i]f there's a complaint to be made about Insidious, it's that the film's second half is unable to live up to the impossibly high standards set by the first half." Ethan Gilsdorf of The Boston Globe wrote that "[t]he film begins with promise" but "[t]he crazy train of Insidious runs fully off the rails when the filmmakers go logical and some of the strange gets explained away as a double shot of demonic possession and astral projection."

Positive reviews have focused on the filmmakers' ability to build suspense. John Anderson of The Wall Street Journal explains "[w]hat makes a movie scary isn't what jumps out of the closet. It's what might jump out of the closet. The blood, the gore and the noise of so many fright films miss the horrifying point: Movie watchers are far more convinced, instinctively, that what we don't know will most assuredly hurt us... Insidious establishes that these folks can make a film that operates on an entirely different level, sans gore, or obvious gimmicks. And make flesh crawl." Michael Phillips of the Chicago Tribune wrote: "director James Wan and screenwriter Leigh Whannell admire all sorts of fright, from the blatant to the insidiously subtle. This one lies at an effective halfway point between those extremes." Peter Travers of Rolling Stone commented: "Here's a better-than-average spook house movie, mostly because Insidious decides it can daunt an audience without spraying it with blood." Christy Lemire of the Associated Press stated: "Insidious is the kind of movie you could watch with your eyes closed and still feel engrossed by it."

== Sequels and prequels ==
=== Sequels ===
A sequel, Insidious: Chapter 2, was released on Friday, September 13, 2013.

The fifth film, Insidious: The Red Door, which serves as a direct sequel to Chapter 2, was released on July 7, 2023.

The sixth film, Insidious: Out of the Further, which serves as a sequel to The Red Door, was released on August 21, 2026.

=== Prequels ===
A third installment, Insidious: Chapter 3, with Leigh Whannell serving as director and writer, was released on June 5, 2015, to a high box office gross and a mixed critical response.

A fourth installment, with Adam Robitel as director and Whannell as writer of the film, Insidious: The Last Key was released on January 5, 2018, and received mixed reviews.

== See also ==
- List of ghost films
