= Joseph Bishara =

American composer (born 1970)

- Bishara in 2026
- Born: July 26, 1970 (age 56)
- Occupations: Composer, music producer, actor

Joseph Bishara (born July 26, 1970) is an American composer, music producer, and actor, best known for his work scoring films such as Insidious, 11-11-11, Dark Skies, and The Conjuring. Although his career began with the 1998 Biblical drama Joseph's Gift, he composes music for mainly horror and thriller films, and has collaborated several times with director James Wan. Projects by directors John Carpenter and Joseph Zito, and musicians Ray Manzarek and Diamanda Galás have incorporated his work. In addition to composing, he frequently appears in films he is involved in, usually made up as a demon or other supernatural creature. He has also been a producer on Repo! The Genetic Opera and other projects.

== Career ==
=== Early endeavors ===
After an early influence of classical music, Bishara began experimenting with electronic and experimental music, becoming interested in Tangerine Dream. He became engrossed in horror film scores after watching the silent film The Cabinet of Dr. Caligari of 1920 and the 1922 horror classic Nosferatu. In the late 1980s he became a member of the industrial band Yesterday's Tear, later known as Drown. By around 1994, he was signed to a record and touring contract with Drown. He also briefly toured with Prong.

=== Film scoring ===
Although Bishara's film score work began with the Biblical drama Joseph's Gift in 1998, most of his subsequent work has comprised horror films starting with Unearthed and The Gravedancers in 2006 and Night of the Demons in 2009. His collaborations with filmmaker James Wan led to his prominence as a film score composer and popularity in the industry.

He began to be the subject of more media attention with the Wan-directed film Insidious in 2011. The New York Times film critic Mike Hale remarked that Bishara's score helped the film recover from some of its negative attributes such as "pedestrian camerawork". Writing for Howlin' Wolf Records, Jason Comerford referred to the film soundtrack as a "dense, bristling effort jam-packed with invention and energy". Journalist Jonathan Barkan of Dread Central and Bloody Disgusting named the musical accompaniment as "one of the great masterpieces of horror music from this century". The score was performed by a string quartet accompanied by Bishara producing sounds on a rusted piano using hammers, files, and other "experimental instruments" of his design. Much of the music was recorded before Wan began shooting the film, the musicians improvising some parts as they went along but following Bishara's broad structure and concept. Bishara began sending completed recordings to Wan as he was editing the film so Wan could work the score into the film according to the structure he desired. Though film composers are typically more involved in music placement, Bishara noted the process used on Insidious felt "free". He also acted in the film, portraying a demon that served as the film's main antagonist.

Bishara went on to score the Darren Lynn Bousman film 11-11-11. In 2013, he worked with Scott Stewart to write the music for the science fiction horror film Dark Skies. Writing for Film Journal International, critic Justin Lowe referred to the score as "unnerving" but suitable within the background of the action. Bishara then reunited with Wan to compose the music for The Conjuring. He also portrays an entity named Bathsheba in the film. Wan's producers gave him wide latitude to decide who he wanted to work with him on the film, so he brought back many of the crew from Insidious, including Bishara. Bishara composed the music for the sequel to Insidious, Insidious: Chapter 2 (2013), but did not return to portray the demon.

In 2014, Bishara scored the John R. Leonetti horror film Annabelle, for which he received an ASCAP Top Box Office Films award. He next composed the music for a segment of the 2014 anthology film V/H/S: Viral, "Gorgeous Vortex", as well as the Wan production Insidious: Chapter 3, and another horror film, The Vatican Tapes, on which he replaced Mike Patton of Faith No More. Bishara scored the music for the 2016 horror thriller The Other Side of the Door and returned to work with Wan, composing for The Conjuring 2 and appearing in the film as an entity named the "Winged Creature" (credited as "Demon"). He also scored the 2018 installment in the Insidious film series, Insidious: The Last Key.

Bishara announced in August 2018 that his label, Void Recordings, would release a 27-track compilation of developmental and unreleased music from the Insidious film series, More Music from the Further. Writing for the horror web site Bloody Disgusting, producer Brad Miska said that the compilation carried an avant-garde style over its entirety. He compared it to works by Tangerine Dream and John Carpenter, and said it also bore elements of classical, early goth, and industrial music.

=== Production and sound design ===
In addition to composing, Bishara has worked in other aspects of film production, providing sound design services for John Carpenter's Ghosts of Mars and acting as music producer for Repo! The Genetic Opera. The Ghosts of Mars project involved programming and remixing music composed by Carpenter and determining how it would be integrated into the film. In 2015, Bishara helped produce the song "Shroud" on rapper Tech N9ne's album Special Effects. He worked with Tech N9ne in 2018 to produce and co-write the song "Brightfall" for the Planet album. The song inspired a series of horror shorts starring Tech N9ne and Bishara.

=== Acting ===
Bishara acts in several of the films he is musically involved in, usually portraying demons or other supernatural entities. Miska refers to him as a "creature performer". His debut performance was as the main antagonist in Insidious, the Lipstick-Face Demon, a role he reprised in Insidious: Chapter 2 and Insidious: The Last Key. He portrayed Bathsheba in The Conjuring, and demonic creatures in The Conjuring 2 and the Annabelle film series.

== Musical style ==
Bishara is known to be fond of horror, and he has said he favors composing for the genre above others: "It is the one that had the most energy for me. There always just seemed to be something a little bit more compelling about being on the edge of everything going away." He is known for his avant-garde style and unique approach to instrumentation and composition that suits horror films particularly well. Music journalists have noted his disregard for horror film score conventions, employing "gut-wrenching string dissonance, haunting electronic sounds and sudden crescendoes" and using strings and percussion to create effects designed to evoke "maximum shock effect" in the listener. Marine Wong Kwok Chuen of Score It Magazine wrote that "Bishara's distinctive sounds of fear have become instant classics in modern horror", citing the distinctive styles of the Insidious and Conjuring films, while journalist Jonathan Barkan wrote "There is no safety in Bishara’s music... nor should there be."

== Filmography ==
=== Film ===
Year	Title	Director	Notes
1998	Joseph's Gift	Philippe Mora	—N/a
2000	The Convent	Mike Mendez	—N/a
2003	Power Play	Joseph Zito	—N/a
2006	The Gravedancers	Mike Mendez	—N/a
2007	Unearthed	Matthew Leutwyler	—N/a
2008	Autopsy	Adam Gierasch	—N/a
2009	Night of the Demons	Adam Gierasch	—N/a
2010	Insidious	James Wan	—N/a
2011	11-11-11	Darren Lynn Bousman	—N/a
2013	Dark Skies	Scott Stewart	—N/a
2013	The Conjuring	James Wan	—N/a
2013	Insidious: Chapter 2	James Wan	—N/a
2014	V/H/S: Viral	Todd Lincoln	Segment: Gorgeous Vortex
2014	Annabelle	John R. Leonetti	—N/a
2014	Grace: The Possession	Jeff Chan	—N/a
2015	Insidious: Chapter 3	Leigh Whannell	—N/a
2015	The Vatican Tapes	Mark Neveldine	—N/a
2015	Tales of Halloween	Adam Gierasch; Mike Mendez	Segments: "Trick" and "Friday the 31st"
2016	The Other Side of the Door	Johannes Roberts	—N/a
2016	The Conjuring 2	James Wan	—N/a
2016	The Worthy	Ali F. Mostafa	—N/a
2017	Dead Night	Brad Baruh	—N/a
2018	Insidious: The Last Key	Adam Robitel	—N/a
2018	Aquaman	James Wan	"Trench Engaged" track, main score composed by Rupert Gregson-Williams
2019	The Prodigy	Nicholas McCarthy	—N/a
2019	Room for Rent	Tommy Stovall	—N/a
2019	The Curse of La Llorona	Michael Chaves	—N/a
2019	Annabelle Comes Home	Gary Dauberman	—N/a
2020	Body Cam	Malik Vitthal	—N/a
2020	Dreamkatcher	Kerry Harris	—N/a
2021	The Unholy	Evan Spiliotopoulos	—N/a
2021	The Conjuring: The Devil Made Me Do It	Michael Chaves	—N/a
2021	Malignant	James Wan	—N/a
2021	The Free Fall	Adam Stilwell	—N/a
2022	Lullaby	John R. Leonetti	—N/a
2023	Trim Season	Ariel Vida	—N/a
2023	Insidious: The Red Door	Patrick Wilson	—N/a
2023	The Cello	Darren Lynn Bousman	—N/a
2024	Tarot	Spenser Cohen; Anna Halberg	—N/a
2025	V/H/S/Halloween	Micheline Pitt-Norman; R.H. Norman	"Song of Samhain" track, Segment: "Home Haunt"
2026	Hokum	Damian McCarthy	—N/a
2026	The Leader	Michael Gallagher	—N/a
2026	Insidious: Out of the Further	Jacob Chase	—N/a
TBA	Casket Girls	Justin G. Dyck	—N/a

Sound producer and designer

- Ghosts of Mars (2001)
- Repo! The Genetic Opera (2008)
- The Devil's Carnival (2012)
- Alleluia! The Devil's Carnival (2016)

=== Television ===
Year	Title	Notes	Ref.
2002	Masters of Horror	Television documentary film	
2018–20	Eli Roth's History of Horror	—N/a	
2022	Pretty Little Liars: Original Sin	—N/a	

=== Actor ===
Year	Title	Role	Director	Notes
2010	Insidious	Lipstick-Face Demon	James Wan	—N/a
2013	The Conjuring	Bathsheba	James Wan	—N/a
2014	Annabelle	Annabelle Demon	John R. Leonetti	Uncredited
2015	Insidious: Chapter 3	Lipstick-Face Demon	Leigh Whannell	—N/a
2016	The Conjuring 2	Valak Demon	James Wan	—N/a
2017	Annabelle: Creation	Annabelle Demon	David F. Sandberg	—N/a
2017	Dead Night	Crone	Brad Baruh	—N/a
2018	Insidious: The Last Key	Lipstick-Face Demon	Adam Robitel	—N/a
2020	Dreamkatcher	Night Hag	Kerry Harris	—N/a
2023	Insidious: The Red Door	Lipstick-Face Demon	Patrick Wilson	—N/a
2026	Insidious: Out of the Further	Lipstick-Face Demon	Jacob Chase	—N/a

== Awards ==
- 2010 – Fangoria Chainsaw Award for Best Score – Insidious
