= Brandon Perea =

American actor (born 1995)

- Born: May 25, 1995 (age 31); Schaumburg, Illinois, U.S.
- Occupation: Actor
- Years active: 2012–present

Brandon Perea (born May 25, 1995) is an American-born Puerto Rican-Filipino actor and professional jamskater, best known for his performance as Alfonso "French" Sosa on The OA and his breakthrough role of Angel Torres in Jordan Peele's 2022 science fiction horror film Nope.

== Early life ==
Perea was born in Schaumburg, Illinois, and raised throughout Chicago. He has an older brother, Mike, and a younger brother, Jordan. He is of Filipino and Puerto Rican descent.

He has been breakdancing since he was a kid, his father being a breakdancer, and would become the youngest-ever pro Jamskater. From the ages of 14 to 16, he traveled the United States performing in roller rinks a mashup of disco-style skating with modern breakdance. He moved out at the age of 16, with permission from his parents, to pursue his dreams in Los Angeles of acting.

In 2012, Perea made an appearance on the Nickelodeon show Figure It Out, performing as a Jamskater, where he won the grand prize of a trip to the Great Wolf Lodge. He would also appear on the tenth season of the reality competition show America's Got Talent with his jam skating crew, Honor Roll. The group made it the Judge Cuts round, however was eliminated before Quarterfinals.

== Career ==
Perea was discovered by a talent manager at a skating convention in Las Vegas, who asked him to audition for a movie. Although he did not get the role, it eventually led to his first gig years later. Perea began his acting career playing Alfonso "French" Sosa on the Netflix mystery drama series The OA. He continued in this role from 2016 to the show's cancellation in 2019. He also had his first minor movie role in the 2016 comedy drama Dance Camp, which was released onto Youtube Red.

In 2020, Perea had a guest star role in DC's Doom Patrol television series as the Terrible Doctor Tyme, a clock-headed villain who uses a time-altering space mineral to throw roller disco parties.

In 2022, he was cast as Romy Faith in the drama The Faith of Long Beach, set to be directed by Eric Amadio. As of 2024, the film is still in pre-production and unclear if it will continue.

Perea got his breakout role in 2022 with Jordan Peele's American western science fiction horror film, Nope. His co-stars included Daniel Kaluuya, Keke Palmer, and Steven Yeun. Peele originally wrote the character of Angel Torres as a "happy-go-lucky" geek-like character until Perea was cast as the character, who wanted to expand upon the character and portray him as more grounded. Peele, who found Perea's audition portrayal more compelling, altered and expanded the script to create a larger character for him. Perea was praised for his performance, being named a "scene stealer" for his comedic relief and depth. Screen Rant's Ben Kendrick called his portrayal of Angel Torres a "stand-out" among the supporting cast. The performance earned him a selection as a Breakthrough Artist at the 2022 BAFTA's.

In 2024, Perea portrayed tornado wrangler Boone in the summer blockbuster Twisters, a stand-alone sequel to the 1996 film. He starred alongside Daisy Edgar-Jones, Glen Powell, and Anthony Ramos. He also had a small role in the 2024 horror suspense film Amp House Massacre, playing Niko.

In 2025, he appeared in Kogonada's romantic fantasy film A Big Bold Beautiful Journey, alongside Margot Robbie and Colin Farrell.

== Personal life ==
Perea's main talents include acting, jamskating, dancing, and BMXing. He is also trained in boxing, Muay Thai, and MMA.

== Filmography ==
Key
†	Denotes productions that have not yet been released

=== Film ===
Year	Title	Role	Notes
2016	Dance Camp	Kenton	
2021	American Insurrection	Arjay	
2022	Nope	Angel Torres	
2024	Twisters	Boone	
2024	Amp House Massacre	Niko	
2025	A Big Bold Beautiful Journey	Mike	
2025	Spilled Milk	Jose	Short film
2026	Insidious: Out of the Further	Nick Mendoza	

=== Television ===
Year	Title	Role	Notes
2012	Figure It Out	Self - Jam Skater	Episode: "Rollerskates & Worm Races"
2015	America's Got Talent	Self - Honor Roll Skate Crew	Episode: "1002," "1010"
2016–2019	The OA	Alfonso "French" Sosa	Main role (12 episodes)
2020	Doom Patrol	Dr. Jonathan Tyme	Episode: "Tyme Patrol"
2024	Laid	Simon	
2025	Poker Face	Felix Domingo	Episode: "Hometown Hero"

=== Music videos ===
Year	Song	Role	Artist(s)
2018	"One Day"	Diego	Logic, Ryan Tedder
2021	"Yours"	Himself	Maye

== Awards and nominations ==
Year	Award	Category	Nominated work	Result	Ref.
2022	British Academy of Film and Television Arts	U.S. Breakthrough	Nope	—N/a	
