= Insidious: Chapter 3 =

2015 film by Leigh Whannell

- Theatrical release poster
- Directed by: Leigh Whannell
- Written by: Leigh Whannell
- Produced by: Jason Blum; Oren Peli; James Wan
- Starring: Dermot Mulroney; Stefanie Scott; Angus Sampson; Leigh Whannell; Lin Shaye
- Cinematography: Brian Pearson
- Edited by: Timothy Alverson
- Music by: Joseph Bishara
- Production companies: Blumhouse Productions; Entertainment One; Stage 6 Films
- Distributed by: Gramercy Pictures (through Focus Features; United States) (Note: Distribution of Insidious: Chapter 3 for all media was split between Focus Features and Sony Pictures Releasing. While Focus handled the United States theatrical distribution rights, Sony Pictures handled international theatrical, worldwide television and some home video distribution rights to the film.); Entertainment One (Canada, United Kingdom and Spain)
- Release date: June 5, 2015
- Running time: 98 minutes
- Countries: United States; Canada; United Kingdom
- Language: English
- Budget: $10–11 million
- Box office: $120.5 million

Insidious: Chapter 3 is a 2015 supernatural horror film written and directed by Leigh Whannell, in his directorial debut. The film is a prequel to Insidious (2011) and the third installment in the Insidious franchise. Focusing on a new family and story, the film stars Dermot Mulroney and Stefanie Scott, with Angus Sampson, Whannell, and Lin Shaye reprising their roles from the previous films.

In September 2013, a third installment in the Insidious series was announced, with Whannell returning as writer and Jason Blum and Oren Peli producing. Filming took place from July to August in Los Angeles.

The film was released on June 5, 2015, received mixed reviews from critics and grossed $120 million against a budget of $10 million. A sequel, Insidious: The Last Key, was released in January 2018.

== Plot ==
In 2007, three years before the Lambert haunting (Note: As depicted in Insidious (2010).), teenager Quinn Brenner meets with retired demonologist Elise Rainier. Elise reluctantly agrees to try to contact the spirit of Quinn's mother, Lily, who died one year prior. However, Elise urges Quinn not to try to contact her mother again after sensing a malevolent force.

Grace, an elderly woman who lives at Quinn's apartment building and has dementia, says several strange and cryptic things to Quinn, seeming to allude to an unseen spirit. Quinn later attends an audition for a performance arts school. After leaving the audition, she sees a mysterious figure waving to her from the distance on the street. Distracted, she is hit by a car, breaking both of her legs.

Now stuck in her home with her father, Sean, and brother, Alex, Quinn begins to experience increasingly disturbing paranormal phenomena, including seeing visions of a dark spirit wearing an oxygen mask known as the Man Who Can't Breathe. Quinn realizes that he is the same figure that caused her accident. Sean runs into Grace's husband, Harry, and learns that Grace has passed away.

Sean meets with Elise, who like him is also grieving after the death of her husband, Jack, and tries to convince her to help his daughter. Elise declines, stating that her previous visits to the dark spiritual world of the Further made her realize that an evil spirit―a Bride in Black―is hunting her. However, she is convinced by her friend and former colleague, Carl, to continue using her spiritual ability after he reminds her about her successful case involving Josh Lambert in 1986 (Note: As depicted in Insidious: Chapter 2 (2013).) and that she is stronger than the spirits, because she is still alive.

Due to Elise's initial refusal, Alex suggests Sean call on alleged demonologists, Specs and Tucker, who have built a following on the internet. During their investigation, Quinn becomes briefly possessed by the Man Who Can't Breathe and attacks Sean, Specs, and Tucker. Sean realizes Specs and Tucker are frauds and prepares to kick the duo out until Elise arrives. Deducing that the dark spirit's goal is to lure potential victims to the Further, so it can eat their life force, Elise decides to enter the spiritual world and enlists Specs and Tucker to help.

Elise enters the Further and has a brief fight with the Bride in Black before she discovers Jack's spirit. Jack begins to encourage Elise to commit suicide, so that they might be reunited. Elise realizes that Jack is actually the Man Who Can't Breathe in disguise and orders it to release Quinn. Quinn appears. Elise and the Man Who Can't Breathe engage in a struggle over Quinn before Elise escapes the Further and realizes that Quinn has to defeat him on her own. Though Quinn is at first at a disadvantage, Elise receives a message from Grace's spirit: Lily had left Quinn a letter to read before she graduated high school, but Quinn never found it. Elise calls out to Lily's spirit to help. Lily suddenly appears in the Further and helps Quinn defeat the Man Who Can't Breathe by inspiring her to stand up for herself and pull off his mask, seemingly suffocating and destroying him. Quinn escapes the Further. Elise gives parting words to the family, including words of encouragement from Lily's spirit. She leaves with Specs and Tucker and the three agree to form a partnership.

Later in her home, Elise's dog barks at an unseen force. Elise cannot see that behind her, a demon with a red face is watching.

== Cast ==
- Lin Shaye as Elise Rainier
- Stefanie Scott as Quinn Brenner
- Dermot Mulroney as Sean Brenner
- Angus Sampson as Tucker
- Leigh Whannell as Specs
- Hayley Kiyoko as Maggie
- Tate Berney as Alex Brenner
- Michael Reid MacKay as "The Man Who Can't Breathe"
- Tom Gallop as Dr. Henderson
- Steve Coulter as Carl
- Phyllis Applegate as Grace
- Ashton Moio as Hector
- Ele Keats as Lillith Brenner
- Tom Fitzpatrick as Bride in Black
- Garrett Ryan as Young Josh Lambert
- Joseph Bishara as Lipstick-Face Demon
- James Wan as Theater Director

== Production ==
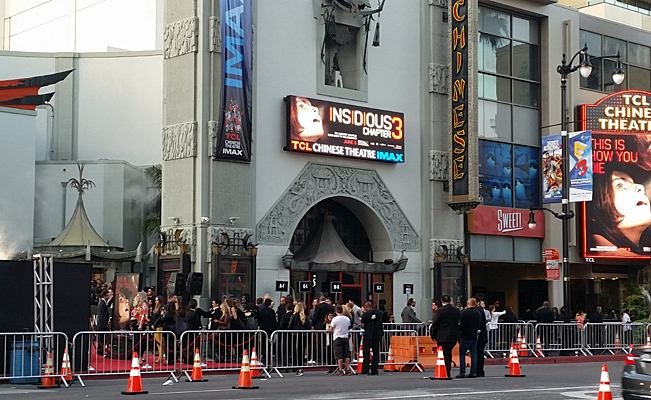
Premiere at the TCL Chinese Theatre in Hollywood (June 4, 2015)

On September 15, 2013, a third installment in the Insidious series was announced, with Leigh Whannell signed on to return as writer, and Jason Blum and Oren Peli set to produce. When asked about returning for another sequel, actor Patrick Wilson went on to say that he "[doesn't] know where else it could go", and that "[Josh Lambert has] been through the wringer, and I think the movie sets it up well at the end [...] And that's great, that's how it should end." On November 13, 2013, it was announced Focus Features and Stage 6 Films would release the film on April 3, 2015. The date was later moved to May 29, 2015.

On March 11, 2014, Screen Rant reported that the third film would not focus on the Lamberts, but on a new family and story, and would not connect to the last scene in the second film. It was also reported that both Whannell and Angus Sampson would return as ghost hunters Specs and Tucker, along with Lin Shaye as Elise. On May 7, 2014, Wan tweeted that Whannell would direct the third film, which marks his directorial debut. In June 2014, Stefanie Scott and Dermot Mulroney were cast in the film. On September 22, 2014, during the Cinema Diverse Film Festival in Palm Springs, actress Ele Keats said she had recently wrapped an undisclosed supporting role in the film.

=== Filming ===
Principal photography began on July 9, 2014, in Los Angeles under the title "Into The Further", on a scheduled 29-day shoot. Several scenes were shot in the San Fernando Valley at the Delfino Studios in Sylmar, where the Brenner apartment's interiors were built.

A first look image was released on July 22, 2014. Filming wrapped on August 18, 2014.

=== Music ===
The musical score for Insidious: Chapter 3 is composed by Joseph Bishara, who composed the music for the previous installments. A soundtrack album for the film was released digitally on June 5, 2015 by Void Recordings.

== Release ==
=== Box office ===
Insidious: Chapter 3 grossed $52.2 million in North America and $68.2 million in other territories, for a worldwide total of $120.5 million, against a budget of $10 million.

In North America, the film made $1.6 million from its early Thursday night showings, from 2,150 theaters, and $10.4 million on its opening day, from 3,003 theaters. It finished at third place in its opening weekend, earning $23 million behind fellow opener Spy and holdover San Andreas.

Outside North America, Insidious: Chapter 3 grossed $14.3 million in its opening weekend, from 42 countries on 2,989 screens, also finishing in third place behind San Andreas and Spy. It had the biggest opening for a horror film in the Philippines ($1.5 million) and in Vietnam ($620,000), the second-biggest in Malaysia ($1.6 million), and had similarly successful openings in Russia and the CIS ($2.7 million). Mexico opened with $1.8 million and India with $620,000.

=== Critical reception ===
The review aggregator website Rotten Tomatoes lists a 56% approval rating based on 126 reviews and a rating average of 5.6/10. The site's critical consensus reads, "Insidious: Chapter 3 isn't as terrifying as the original, although it boasts surprising thematic depth and is enlivened by another fine performance from Lin Shaye." On Metacritic the film has a score of 52 out of 100 based on 26 critics, indicating "mixed or average" reviews. In CinemaScore polls, cinema audiences gave the film an average score of "B+" on an A+ to F scale.

Daniel Krupa of IGN awarded it a score of 7.1 out of 10, saying "Insidious: Chapter 3 is the most focussed, dark, and creepy installment of the series to date." Scott Foundas of Variety gave the film a negative review, saying "Chief among things that go bump in the night in Insidious: Chapter 3 is the movie itself—a thuddingly dull prequel to James Wan's very enjoyable (and highly profitable) demonic-possession horror franchise." Justin Lowe of The Hollywood Reporter gave the film a positive review, saying "Insidious: Chapter 3 offers a relatable young protagonist and several key supporting players from the prior films in a nimble setup to the series." Kyle Anderson of Entertainment Weekly gave the film a C+, saying "Insidious Chapter 3 is the worst kind of sequel: Not terrible, but also cartoonishly unnecessary." Michael Ordoña of the San Francisco Chronicle rated it zero out of four stars, saying "Insidious: Chapter 3 is simply not scary. Not a bit, not a whit. Except that the audience will be terrified of the next stabbing of their eardrums, at generally predictable intervals." Michael O'Sullivan of The Washington Post gave the film one-and-a-half stars out of four, saying "The Insidious franchise, after three attempts to exorcise its real demons, still can't seem to shake what really haunts it: the ghost of B-movies past." Peter Howell of the Toronto Star gave the film two-and-a-half stars out of four, saying "This prequel to the shriek hell, directed and scripted by series writer/actor Leigh Whannell, manages to avoid the Curse of the Triple Cash Grab."

Kerry Lengel of The Arizona Republic gave the film three out of five stars, saying "Insidious: Chapter 3 is almost more a spoof of a classic like The Exorcist than it is an homage. It's not scary horror, it's silly horror, and the audience is in on the joke." Stephen Whitty of the Newark Star-Ledger gave the film two-and-a-half stars, saying "You need more than a few sudden noises and scary shocks to make a good horror movie. But Insidious: Chapter Three is at least an OK horror movie." James Berardinelli of ReelViews gave the film two-and-a-half out of four stars, saying "They say the third time's the charm. Not with the Insidious series, it isn't. Admittedly, installment #3 is an improvement over #2, but it fails to reach the highs of the chilling-but-uneven original." Tim Robey of The Telegraph gave the film four out of five stars, saying "It manages the all-important jump scares with the finesse of a skilled stage illusionist, but it’s the surprisingly sincere emotional core that makes it the pick of the series." Katie Rife of The A.V. Club gave the film a B−, saying "The motif of grief runs throughout Insidious: Chapter 3, which is surprisingly thematically rich for the third installment of a horror franchise. This emotional undercurrent informs the fright scenes, which otherwise lean rather heavily on jump scares." Bilge Ebiri of New York magazine gave the film a negative review, saying "This is so often the problem with this genre—scary setups, followed by dopey resolutions—that you sort of want to give the movie a pass. But given its distinguished forebears, Insidious: Chapter 3 doesn’t quite live up to expectations."

=== Home media ===
Insidious: Chapter 3 was released on DVD and Blu-ray on October 6, 2015.

== Sequel ==
In an interview Leigh Whannell was asked "If there is a fourth Insidious film, would that be a sequel to Chapter 3, another prequel to the original or will it continue in this timeline or go to a whole new timeline?" Whannell stated: "I don't know. I haven't really thought about it yet. But for the purposes of this interview, I'll say that I'd like to explore the time between this film and the first film. That whole area there where Elise has rediscovered her gift, I think you could have a lot of adventures before she arrives. So I think there is a lot of room there. We've kind of established Lin [Shaye] in this particular film as kind of this superhero, so that would be kind of interesting to explore in the other films."

Insidious: The Last Key was announced in May 2016 for a release date of October 20, 2017. Whannell will return to write, Blum, Peli and Wan producing as well as Shaye reprising her role as Elise Rainier and Adam Robitel directing. The film was released on January 5, 2018.

== See also ==
- List of ghost films
