= Amelia Eve =

English actress

- Born: 2 February 1992 (age 34); London, England
- Education: National Youth Theatre of Great Britain
- Occupations: Actress; production manager; voice actress
- Years active: 2011–present
- Known for: The Haunting of Bly Manor

Amelia Eve (born 2 February 1992) is an English actress. On television, she is best known for her role in the Netflix horror series The Haunting of Bly Manor (2020). Her films include Insidious: Out of the Further (2026).

== Early life and career ==
Eve was born and raised in London, England. In 2018, Eve appeared in the BBC comedy series Enterprice. In 2020, Eve had a starring role as Jamie opposite Victoria Pedretti in the Netflix series The Haunting of Bly Manor. In 2026, Eve starred as Gemma Hall in Insidious: Out of the Further, the sixth movie in the Insidious franchise.

== Filmography ==
=== Film ===
| Year | Title | Role | Notes |
|---|---|---|---|
| 2011 | Fifth Time Lucky | Brooke | |
| 2012 | Ill Manors | | |
| 2013 | Feed the Beast | Jug | |
| 2015 | Idéar | Idéar | |
| 2017 | Mens Sana | Joyce | |
| 2020 | Big Boys Don't Cry | Cass | |
| 2022 | Phea | Molly | |
| 2023 | The Blind | Kay Robertson | |
| 2026 | Insidious: Out of the Further | Gemma Hall | |

=== Television ===
| Year | Title | Role | Notes |
|---|---|---|---|
| 2018 | Enterprice | Charlotte | Episode: "Hoops 'n' Dreams" |
| 2020 | The Haunting of Bly Manor | Jamie | Main cast |
| 2022 | Leopard Skin | Maru | |

=== Music videos ===
| Year | Song | Artist |
|---|---|---|
| 2015 | "Powerful" | Major Lazer featuring Ellie Goulding and Tarrus Riley |
| 2015 | "Girl (If you are who you say you are)" | Jesse Sheehan |
| 2016 | "Beg And Crawl" | Max Jury |
| 2020 | "My Little Love, My Funny Valentine (Uk Garage '18)" | Latir |
| 2024 | "I Only Smoke When I Drink" | nimino |
