= Insidious: The Last Key =

2018 film by Adam Robitel

- Theatrical release poster
- Directed by: Adam Robitel
- Written by: Leigh Whannell
- Produced by: Jason Blum; Oren Peli; James Wan; Leigh Whannell
- Starring: Lin Shaye; Angus Sampson; Leigh Whannell; Spencer Locke; Caitlin Gerard; Bruce Davison
- Cinematography: Toby Oliver
- Edited by: Timothy Alverson
- Music by: Joseph Bishara
- Production companies: Blumhouse Productions; Stage 6 Films
- Distributed by: Universal Pictures (Note: Distribution of Insidious: The Last Key for all media was split between Universal Pictures and Sony Pictures Releasing. While Universal handled domestic theatrical distribution rights, Sony Pictures handled international theatrical, worldwide television and home video distribution rights to the film.)
- Release date: January 5, 2018 (United States)
- Running time: 103 minutes
- Country: United States
- Language: English
- Budget: $10 million
- Box office: $172.8 million

Insidious: The Last Key is a 2018 American supernatural horror film directed by Adam Robitel and written by Leigh Whannell. It is produced by Jason Blum, Oren Peli, and James Wan. It is the fourth installment in the Insidious franchise, and the second in the chronology of the story running through the series. Starring Lin Shaye, Angus Sampson, Whannell, Spencer Locke, Caitlin Gerard, and Bruce Davison, the film follows parapsychologist Elise Rainier as she investigates a haunting in her childhood home. The film is the sequel to Insidious: Chapter 3 (2015) and the second prequel to Insidious (2010) and Insidious: Chapter 2 (2013).

Talks for a fourth installment in the franchise began in June 2015, with Whannell saying the next film would take place shortly before the first film. In May 2016, it was announced that Chapter 4 would have an October 2017 release date with Whannell writing, Blum, Peli and Wan producing, Robitel directing, and Shaye returning to reprise her role as Elise Rainier. Principal photography began in August 2016, and ended the following month.

The film was released in the United States on January 5, 2018, by Universal Pictures. It grossed $172 million worldwide and received mixed reviews. Insidious: The Red Door was released on July 7, 2023, continuing the storyline of the first two films.

== Plot ==
In 1953, Elise Rainier lives in Five Keys, New Mexico, with her parents, Audrey and Gerald, and brother, Christian. Elise and Christian are frightened by a spirit in their bedroom, and Christian loses a whistle their mother gave him to call for help. Not believing Elise's story, Gerald beats her and locks her in the basement. Elise finds a mysterious red door. She opens it, inadvertently releasing a demonic spirit known as "Keyface," who kills Audrey.

57 years later, Elise works as a paranormal investigator with her colleagues, Specs and Tucker. Three years after completing the Quinn Brenner case (Note: As depicted in Insidious: Chapter 3 (2015).), a man named Ted Garza calls, saying he has been experiencing paranormal activity at his house. Realizing it's her childhood home, Elise departs to help him. While investigating, she finds Christian's lost whistle, but it disappears again after she encounters a female spirit. Elise tells Specs and Tucker that she had seen the spirit before when she was a teenager. She later ran away to escape Gerald's abuse, abandoning Christian.

The three then meet Melissa and Imogen, Christian's daughters, and learn that he is still furious at Elise for abandoning him. Hoping to repair their relationship, Elise gives Melissa a photo of the whistle to show Christian.

That night, Elise and Tucker discover a hidden room in the basement of the house containing a young woman Ted kidnapped. Ted attacks them, but Specs manages to kill him in self-defense. After police clear the house, Christian and his daughters go inside to find the whistle. Melissa is attacked by Keyface. He sends her into a coma with her consciousness now stuck in the spirit realm of the Further.

Trying to save Melissa, Elise searches the house and discovers hidden suitcases containing belongings of numerous other women who had been held prisoner, including the young woman she had seen as a girl. Elise realizes that like Ted, Gerald had also kidnapped women and held them in the secret room. The woman she saw as a teenager, Anna, was actually alive and trying to escape from her father. Elise is ambushed by Keyface and her spirit taken into the Further.

Specs and Tucker help Imogen, who possesses abilities like Elise's, enter the Further. Imogen is led by Anna's ghost into a prison realm where Keyface is holding all of the souls he has taken, including Melissa and Elise. Elise realizes Keyface had been controlling both Gerald and Ted, and fed on the fear generated by the women they kidnapped. Keyface tries to coerce Elise into hurting her father's spirit as revenge for what he has done. Elise starts beating Gerald, but is stopped by Imogen and refuses to feed Keyface any more hatred. Keyface captures Imogen's soul and then attacks Elise, but Gerald tries to save her before he is stabbed by Keyface, his spirit vanishing.

Keyface stabs Melissa, causing her physical body to convulse, then flatline. He attempts to possess Elise but Elise blows Christian's whistle and Audrey's spirit arrives, vanquishing Keyface. Audrey helps Elise, Melissa and Imogen escape the Further. While searching for the way, they open a door and see a 10-year-old boy, Dalton Lambert, in his attic (Note: As depicted in Insidious (2010).). Realizing they opened the wrong door, they finally managed to escape, inadvertently leaving the door to Dalton open. Melissa's spirit returns to her body in the real world, saving her life. Elise makes amends with her mother's spirit and she and Imogen return to their own bodies. Christian and Elise reconcile.

Later, Elise receives a call from a woman named Lorraine. Elise had helped her son years earlier (Note: As depicted in Insidious: Chapter 2 (2013).), and now she needs Elise's help again for her grandson Dalton.

== Cast ==
- Lin Shaye as Elise Rainier
  - Ava Kolker as young Elise Rainier
  - Hana Hayes as teenage Elise Rainier
- Angus Sampson as Tucker
- Leigh Whannell as Specs
- Spencer Locke as Melissa Rainier
- Caitlin Gerard as Imogen Rainier
- Bruce Davison as Christian Rainier
  - Pierce Pope as young Christian Rainier
  - Thomas Robie as teenage Christian Rainier
- Kirk Acevedo as Ted Garza
- Josh Stewart as Gerald Rainier
- Tessa Ferrer as Audrey Rainier
- Aleque Reid as Anna
- Marcus Henderson as Detective Whitfield
- Amanda Jaros as Mara Jennings
- Javier Botet as Keyface
- Joseph Bishara as Lipstick-Face Demon

== Production ==
=== Development ===
Prior to the release of Insidious: Chapter 3, Leigh Whannell was asked,

"If there is a Insidious: Chapter 4, would that be a sequel to Chapter 3, another prequel to the original or will it continue in this timeline or go to a whole new timeline?"

Whannell replied,

"I don't know. I haven't really thought about it yet. But for the purposes of this interview, I'll say that I'd like to explore the time between this film and the first film. That whole area there where Elise has rediscovered her gift, I think you could have a lot of adventures before she arrives. So I think there is a lot of room there. We've kind of established Lin [Shaye] in this particular film as kind of this superhero, so that would be kind of interesting to explore in the other films."

On May 16, 2016, it was announced that Chapter 4 would have an October 20, 2017, release date with Whannell writing, Jason Blum, Oren Peli and James Wan producing, Adam Robitel directing, and Lin Shaye returning to reprise her role as Elise Rainier.

=== Filming ===
Principal photography began in August 2016, and ended the following month.

== Release ==
Insidious: The Last Key was released on January 5, 2018. The film was then released a week later on January 12, 2018, in the United Kingdom.

=== Marketing ===
On August 29, 2017, it was announced via Universal Studios' Halloween Horror Nights that the film would be titled Insidious: The Last Key. In October 2017, the first poster and two trailer were divulged via Universal and Sony Pictures Entertainment. The variant poster art for social media promotion was designed by American artist Justin Paul.

=== Box office ===
Insidious: The Last Key grossed $67.7 million in the United States and Canada, and $105.1 million in other territories, for a worldwide total of $172.8 million, against a production budget of $10 million. It became the highest-grossing film in the franchise, surpassing the second installment's $161 million, and was the first film of the series to gross $100 million overseas.

In the United States and Canada, Insidious: The Last Key was released alongside the wide expansion of Molly's Game, and was projected to gross $20–22 million from 3,116 theaters in its opening weekend. The film made $1.98 grossed from Thursday night previews, the highest preview total of the franchise. It went on to debut to $29.3 million for the weekend, finishing second at the box office behind holdover Jumanji: Welcome to the Jungle and marking the second-highest opening of the series and grossing, behind Chapter 2.

=== Critical response ===
On review aggregator Rotten Tomatoes, the film holds an approval rating of 34%, based on 110 reviews, with an average rating of 5.1/10. The website's critical consensus reads, "Insidious: The Last Key offers franchise star Lin Shaye another welcome opportunity to take the lead, but her efforts aren't enough to rescue this uninspired sequel." On Metacritic, the film has a weighted average score of 49 out of 100, based on 23 critics, indicating "mixed or average reviews." Audiences polled by CinemaScore gave the film an average grade of "B−" on an A+ to F scale.

Screen Rant's Sandy Schaefer scored the film 3/5 stars, stating "Insidious: The Last Key is a solid finale to the Insidious franchise that gives series lead Lin Shaye the chance to take a graceful final bow." Brent McKnight of the Seattle Times rated the film two stars, saying "Old horror franchises don't die, they unspool tepid, uninspired sequels in perpetuity. And with the fourth chapter, Insidious: The Last Key, this saga is on a familiar path." Emily Yoshida of New York Magazine noted how "the fourth installment of Leigh Whannell's ghost-and-mediums horror series wraps up its own free-association illogic with an impenetrable tangle of woo-woo spirit-world mechanics and lingo," while John DeFore of Hollywood Reporter faulted the film's delivery of "the boos" as remaining "cheap and arbitrary."

=== Home media ===
Insidious: The Last Key was released on Digital HD on March 20, 2018, and was released on DVD and Blu-ray on April 3, 2018, by Sony Pictures Home Entertainment.

== Sequel ==
On October 29, 2020, it was announced that a sequel was in the works with Scott Teems writing the screenplay based on a story by Leigh Whannell and series star Patrick Wilson directing. It focuses on a grown-up Dalton, a role reprised by series star Ty Simpkins, as he heads off to college. It released on July 7, 2023.
