= Leigh Whannell =

Australian filmmaker and actor (born 1977)

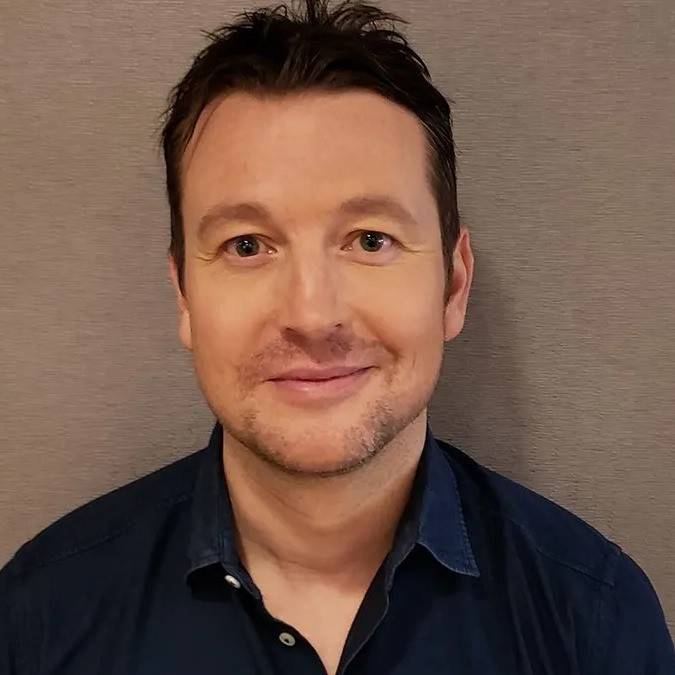
- Whannell in 2018
- Born: 17 January 1977 (age 49); Melbourne, Victoria, Australia
- Occupations: Actor; screenwriter; producer; director
- Years active: 1996–present

Signature
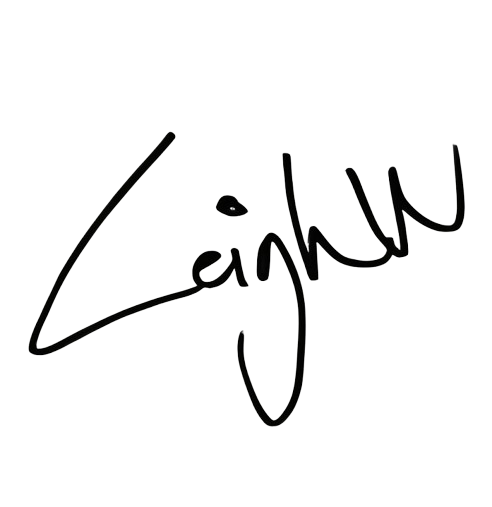

Leigh Whannell (/ˈli wɑːˈnɛl/; born 17 January 1977) is an Australian filmmaker and actor. He has written multiple films that were directed by his friend James Wan, including Saw (2004), Dead Silence (2007), Insidious (2010), and Insidious: Chapter 2 (2013). Whannell made his directorial debut with Insidious: Chapter 3 (2015), and has since directed three more films: Upgrade (2018), The Invisible Man (2020), and Wolf Man (2025).

Whannell and Wan are the creators of the Saw franchise. Whannell wrote the first installment, co-wrote the second and third installments, was producer or executive producer for all the films, and appeared as the Adam Stanheight character in three of the installments. He was also the writer of the Saw video game (2009), and co-writer of the 2014 film Cooties.

== Career ==
=== Television ===
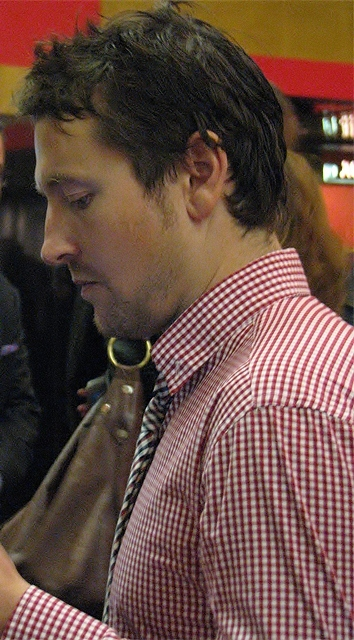
Whannell in 2010

Whannell was born 17 January 1977.

A writer since childhood, Whannell worked as a reporter and film critic for several Australian television shows, including ABC's Recovery, a Saturday morning youth-oriented program that was hosted by Dylan Lewis. Whannell has described the show in a 2011 blog post:

The result was that instead of following the usual MTV ideal of what teenagers want in a TV show—"Hey kids, coming up next we’ve got some seriously WICKED windsurfing moves!!”—Recovery managed to tap into the so-called "alternative" movement that was in full swing at the time by giving teenagers what they actually want: genuine, unpolished anarchy.

Whannell had originally auditioned for the host role, but was later employed as a reporter; Whannell's first interview was with Jackie Chan and he has stated that "Recovery is the best job I've ever had ...".

Whannell appeared in Episode 4, Season 1 of the RMITV production Under Melbourne Tonight presents What's Goin' On There? on 10 June 1998.

=== Film ===
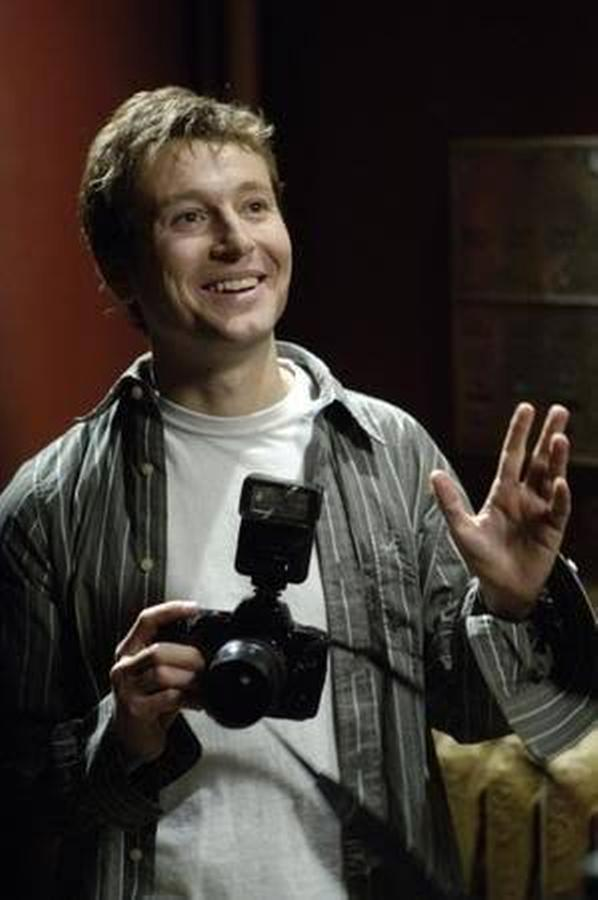
Whannell in an omitted scene from Saw III in 2006

In 2003, Whannell appeared in a minor role in The Matrix Reloaded, as well as in the video game Enter The Matrix as the character "Axel".

While in film school, Whannell met James Wan. Together, the two wrote a script for what would become Saw. After making a short film in 2003 to showcase the intensity of the Saw script, the feature film version, directed by Wan, was made in 2004 and became a low-budget sleeper hit. Whannell played Adam in the film, one of the main characters. The popularity of Saw led to a sequel, Saw II, which was directed and co-written by Darren Lynn Bousman, and on which Whannell co-wrote and revised Bousman's original script, titled The Desperate. Whannell also served as an executive producer.

Around the same time, Whannell returned to collaborate with Wan; they wrote a film called Dead Silence, which Wan directed. It was originally slated for a 2006 release, but small problems with the title pushed the release date back to March 2007. In 2006, the duo composed the story for Saw III; Whannell wrote the screenplay for the third time. It was again directed by Bousman and was released on 27 October 2006. Whannell has a featured cameo, reprising his role as Adam. Saw III grossed $33,610,391 on its opening weekend, making around $129,927,001 worldwide (after 38 days in cinemas) and is currently the most successful Saw film to date.

Whannell's writing partner, Wan, was chosen to direct the film Death Sentence, the first feature film with their participation that they did not write themselves. Whannell has a small role as Spink in Death Sentence.

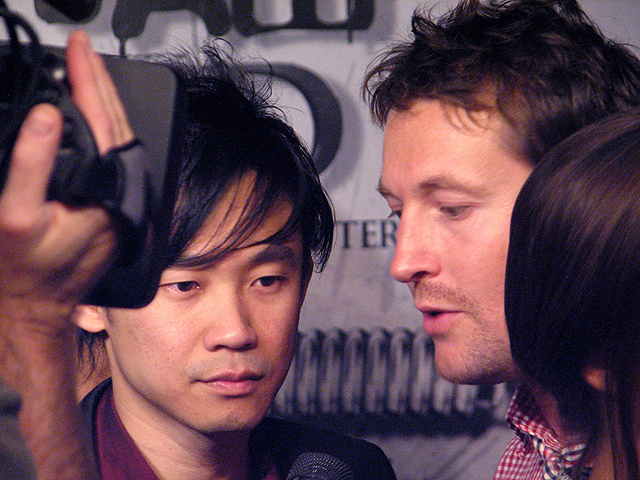
Whannell (right) and James Wan (left) attending the Saw 3D premiere on 27 October 2010.

In 2008, Whannell took off his "writing hat" to perform alongside Nathan Phillips in Dying Breed, a low-budget Australian horror film about a team of zoologists exploring the Tasmanian wilderness to locate a creature thought extinct, the thylacine, or Tasmanian tiger. Instead, they wander into the domain of cannibals who retain their ancestor Alexander Pearce's taste for human flesh, and become prey.

Before and during the production of Saw, Whannell sought medical treatment. "I was going through a bit of a tough time healthwise and suffering anxiety," says Whannell. "The anxiety manifested itself in physical ways. I was suffering headaches everyday for nearly a year. It was serious stuff and really started affecting my life." Spending time in a hospital inspired him to endow the lead antagonist of the Saw series, John Kramer / Jigsaw, with cancer. "It was weird to be 25 and sitting in a neurological ward and I'm surrounded by people who actually had brain tumors. It was very scary and it was my first proper look at mortality. I really wanted to get my health back and it really hammered home how important good health is. If you've got that, you've got everything".

Whannell wrote the script for and acted in the 2010 supernatural horror film, Insidious, which was directed by Wan and produced by Jason Blum and Oren Peli.

In relation to the Saw franchise, Whannell stated, also in 2011:

It's hard to say definitively, because we don't own the copyright for it. The producers could make 10 more if they wanted to. But, if we're to take them at face value, they told us that they were definitely done with it. They're pretty exhausted. They've been making one a year every year for the past seven years, so I think they need some time off.

Media reports were published in mid-2013 in regard to Cooties, a film project that Whannell is an executive producer, actor and screenwriter for. The film's plot concerns an extreme virus that infects an isolated elementary school. Whannell made his directing debut on the sequel Insidious: Chapter 3 (2015), which he also wrote.

In 2014, Whannell expressed possible interest in returning to the Saw franchise; however, in a November 2013 post on his personal blog, Whannell described a new chapter beyond his partnership with Wan, as the director had finally reached his goal of making epic-style blockbuster productions. Whannel explained: "Now, he's off making the films he's always wanted to make – the big ones. I have no doubt that his name will be added to that special club of film directors that he's always admired very soon. I'm so happy for him, like a proud father. And that is why it is the end of an era." Whannell also added that he doesn't rule out collaborating with Wan again, but he felt like he needs to direct a film for the first time.

Whannell was writer-director of the science fiction action film Upgrade, which was released by Blumhouse Tilt and OTL Releasing in 2018 to positive reception. Whannell next wrote, directed, and co-executive produced a retooling of H. G. Wells' book The Invisible Man. The film starred Elisabeth Moss and Oliver Jackson-Cohen, and was released in 2020 to universal critical acclaim; it grossed $145 million on a $7 million budget. In July 2020, it was announced that he is working on a sequel to The Invisible Man. Whannell is currently working on a reboot of Escape from New York. He is also producing and directing a sequel series to Upgrade. In June 2022, he was in talks to direct a reboot film based on the Green Hornet titled The Green Hornet and Kato from Amasia Entertainment and Universal Pictures The success of The Invisible Man led Universal Pictures to team with him again on Wolf Man, which he co-wrote with his wife, Corbett Tuck. The film stars Christopher Abbott and Julia Garner and was released in January 2025.

== Filmography ==
Short film

| Year | Title | Writer | Executive Producer |
|---|---|---|---|
| 2003 | Saw 0.5 | Yes | Yes |
| 2008 | Doggie Heaven | Yes | No |
| 2018 | Home Shopper | Story | Yes |

=== Feature film ===
| Year | Title | Director | Writer | Executive Producer |
|---|---|---|---|---|
| 2004 | Saw | No | Yes | No |
| 2005 | Saw II | No | Yes | Yes |
| 2006 | Saw III | No | Yes | Yes |
| 2007 | Dead Silence | No | Yes | No |
| 2010 | Insidious | No | Yes | No |
| 2013 | Insidious: Chapter 2 | No | Yes | No |
| 2014 | Cooties | No | Yes | Yes |
| 2014 | The Mule | No | Yes | Yes |
| 2015 | Insidious: Chapter 3 | Yes | Yes | No |
| 2018 | Insidious: The Last Key | No | Yes | Producer |
| 2018 | Upgrade | Yes | Yes | Yes |
| 2020 | The Invisible Man | Yes | Yes | Yes |
| 2023 | Insidious: The Red Door | No | Story | Producer |
| 2025 | Wolf Man | Yes | Yes | Yes |
| 2026 | Insidious: Out of the Further | No | No | Producer |

Executive producer only

- Saw IV (2007)
- Saw V (2008)
- Saw VI (2009)
- Saw 3D (2010)
- Jigsaw (2017)
- Spiral (2021)
- Saw X (2023)

=== Acting roles ===
| Year | Title | Roles | Notes |
|---|---|---|---|
| 1996 | Neighbours | Stuart Maughan | 2 episodes |
| 1996–2000 | Recovery | Himself | ABC Music TV series |
| 1999–2000 | Blue Heelers | Jared Ryan | 2 episodes |
| 2003 | Saw | David | Short film |
| 2003 | The Matrix Reloaded | Axel | |
| 2003 | Razor Eaters | Nick D. | |
| 2004 | Saw | Adam Stanheight | |
| 2004 | One Perfect Day | Chris | |
| 2006 | Saw III | Adam Stanheight | |
| 2006 | 30 Even Scarier Movie Moments | Himself | Miniseries |
| 2007 | Death Sentence | Spink | |
| 2008 | Dying Breed | Matt | |
| 2010 | Insidious | Specs | |
| 2010 | Legend of the Guardians: The Owls of Ga'Hoole | Jatt (voice) | |
| 2013 | The Pardon | Clement Moss | |
| 2013 | Crush | David | |
| 2013 | Raze | Elevator Guard | |
| 2013 | Insidious: Chapter 2 | Specs | |
| 2014 | Cooties | Doug | |
| 2014 | The Mule | Gavin | |
| 2015 | Insidious: Chapter 3 | Specs | |
| 2017 | The Bye Bye Man | Larry | |
| 2017 | Keep Watching | Matt Miller | |
| 2018 | Insidious: The Last Key | Specs | |
| 2018 | Aquaman | Cargo Pilot | Cameo |
| 2023 | Insidious: The Red Door | Specs | |
| 2025 | Wolf Man | Dan Kiel (voice) | |

=== Other credits ===
Video games

| Year | Title | Role | Notes |
|---|---|---|---|
| 2003 | Enter the Matrix | Actor | Role: Axel |
| 2009 | Saw | Writer | |

Music video

| Year | Title | Artist | Role |
|---|---|---|---|
| 2021 | "Ceremony" | Deftones | Director |

== Awards and nominations ==
| Year | Award | Category | Nominated work | Result |
|---|---|---|---|---|
| 2005 | Fantasporto Awards | Best Screenplay | Saw | Won |
| 2005 | Teen Choice Awards | Choice Movie Scream | Saw | Nominated |
| 2015 | Rondo Hatton Classic Horror Awards | Best Movie | Insidious: Chapter 3 | Nominated |
| 2018 | Sitges Film Festival Awards | Secció Oficial Fantàstic | Upgrade | Nominated |
| 2018 | South by Southwest Festival Film Awards | Audience Award – Midnighters | Upgrade | Won |
| 2018 | Australian Academy of Cinema and Television Arts Awards | Best Original Screenplay | Upgrade | Nominated |
| 2018 | Hollywood Critics Association Midseason Awards | Best Original Screenplay | Upgrade | Nominated |
| 2019 | Fangoria Chainsaw Awards | Best Wide-Release Film | Upgrade | Nominated |
| 2019 | Australian Film Critics Association Awards | Best Screenplay | Upgrade | Nominated |
| 2020 | Bram Stoker Awards | Best Screenplay | The Invisible Man | Won |
| 2020 | Australian Academy of Cinema and Television Arts Awards | Best Screenplay | The Invisible Man | Nominated |
| 2020 | Australian Academy of Cinema and Television Arts Awards | Best Direction | The Invisible Man | Nominated |
| 2020 | Hollywood Critics Association Midseason Awards | Best Adapted Screenplay | The Invisible Man | Won |
| 2020 | Hollywood Critics Association Midseason Awards | Best Male Director | The Invisible Man | Nominated |
| 2021 | Saturn Awards | Best Director | The Invisible Man | Nominated |
| 2021 | Fangoria Chainsaw Awards | Best Screenplay | The Invisible Man | Won |
| 2021 | Fangoria Chainsaw Awards | Best Director | The Invisible Man | Won |
| 2021 | Austin Film Critics Association Awards | Best Adapted Screenplay | The Invisible Man | Nominated |
