= List of European tornadoes in 2024 =

List of tornadoes in Europe and surrounding regions in 2025

European tornadoes of 2024
- Timespan: 3 January 2024 – 27 December 2024
- Maximum rated tornado: IF3 tornado: Berezino, Russia on 28 September 2024
- Tornadoes: 402
- Fatalities: 1 (19 injuries)

The 2024 European tornado season consisted of tornadoes and tornado outbreaks across Europe and surrounding areas (Note: ESWD data includes Europe, Greenland, the Azores and Canary Islands, countries in the Middle East and North Africa that border the Mediterranean Sea, and Central Asia. For consistency, this list includes all ESWD-confirmed tornadoes.)

IFU	IF0	IF0.5	IF1	IF1.5	IF2	IF2.5	IF3	IF4	IF5	Total
127	19	78	97	57	21	2	1	0	0	402

Many different meteorological organizations across Europe document tornado events, often using different tornado intensity scales, including the TORRO (T) scale, the Fujita (F) scale, the Enhanced Fujita (EF) scale, and the International Fujita (IF) scale. For consistency, this list primarily uses the IF-scale, the preferred scale of the European Severe Storms Laboratory (ESSL) and its database, the European Severe Weather Database (ESWD).

== Season Summary ==
Tornadoes by country
Country (Note: Countries not listed in this table had no reported tornadoes in 2024.)	Total	IFU	IF0	IF0.5	IF1	IF1.5	IF2	IF2.5	IF3	IF4	IF5
Algeria	4	3	0	0	0	1	0	0	0	0	0
Armenia	1	1	0	0	0	0	0	0	0	0	0
Austria	4	0	0	0	2	1	1	0	0	0	0
Belarus	1	0	0	0	1	0	0	0	0	0	0
Belgium	4	0	0	1	1	1	0	1	0	0	0
Bosnia and Herzegovina	1	0	0	0	0	0	1	0	0	0	0
Croatia	3	2	0	0	0	1	0	0	0	0	0
Cyprus	10	2	0	3	2	3	0	0	0	0	0
Czech Republic	2	1	0	1	0	0	0	0	0	0	0
Denmark	12	4	2	3	1	2	0	0	0	0	0
Egypt	1	1	0	0	0	0	0	0	0	0	0
Estonia	3	3	0	0	0	0	0	0	0	0	0
Finland	3	0	0	2	0	1	0	0	0	0	0
France	37	4	2	4	17	7	3	0	0	0	0
Georgia	3	2	0	0	0	0	1	0	0	0	0
Germany	37	5	2	7	12	10	1	0	0	0	0
Greece	12	1	0	2	3	5	1	0	0	0	0
Hungary	2	1	0	0	0	0	1 (Note: This tornado began in Austria but is counted in Hungary's total. In the European total, it is counted under the Austrian entry.)	0	0	0	0
Italy	84	38	6	31	5	3	1	0	0	0	0
Kazakhstan	2	2	0	0	0	0	0	0	0	0	0
Latvia	4	1	0	2	0	1	0	0	0	0	0
Lithuania	3	0	0	0	0	0	3	0	0	0	0
Luxembourg	1	0	0	0	1	0	0	0	0	0	0
Netherlands	4	2	1	1	0	0	0	0	0	0	0
Norway	2	0	0	0	1	1	0	0	0	0	0
Poland	15	6	0	0	5	3	1	0	0	0	0
Portugal	1	1	0	0	0	0	0	0	0	0	0
Romania	1	1	0	0	0	0	0	0	0	0	0
Russia	60	23	3	3	17	5	7	1	1	0	0
Serbia	3	2	0	0	1	0	0	0	0	0	0
Slovakia	1	1	0	0	0	0	0	0	0	0	0
Spain	15	4	0	3	5	2	1	0	0	0	0
Sweden	5	1	0	0	4	0	0	0	0	0	0
Syria	9	2	0	5	2	0	0	0	0	0	0
Tunisia	3	2	0	1	0	0	0	0	0	0	0
Turkey	32	5	3	7	10	7	0	0	0	0	0
Ukraine	9	6	0	1	2	0	0	0	0	0	0
United Kingdom	9	0	0	1	5	3	0	0	0	0	0
Total	402	127	19	78	97	57	21	2	1	0	0

== January ==
IFU	IF0	IF0.5	IF1	IF1.5	IF2	IF2.5	IF3	IF4	IF5	Total
0	0	8	5	5	0	0	0	0	0	18

=== 3 January event ===
List of confirmed tornadoes – Wednesday, 3 January 2024 (Note: All dates are based on the local time zone where the tornado touched down; however, all times are in Coordinated Universal Time for consistency.)
IF#	Location	Region	Country	Start coord.	Time (UTC)	Path length	Max. width
IF1.5	Onze-Lieve-Vrouw-Waver to Putte	Antwerp	Belgium	51.067°N 4.567°E	15:30	8.8 km (5.5 mi)	Unknown
IF1.5	This tornado struck Onze-Lieve-Vrouw-Waver and Putte, damaging about forty to fifty homes, two of which were declared uninhabitable. One person and several horses sustained minor injuries, and a mobile home was overturned.						

=== 6 January event ===
List of confirmed tornadoes – Saturday, 6 January 2024
IF#	Location	Region	Country	Start coord.	Time (UTC)	Path length	Max. width
IF1.5	Pýrgos	Western Greece	Greece	37.668°N 21.452°E	19:30	Unknown	Unknown
IF1.5	Several homes and trees were damaged and a truck was overturned in Pýrgos.						

=== 7 January event ===
List of confirmed tornadoes – Sunday, 7 January 2024
IF#	Location	Region	Country	Start coord.	Time (UTC)	Path length	Max. width
IF1.5	Amórion	Eastern Macedonia and Thrace	Greece	41.300°N 26.433°E	03:15	Unknown	Unknown
IF1.5	A tornado moved through the village, damaging thirteen houses and numerous trees.						
IF1	Sarıcaali	Edirne	Turkey	40.983°N 26.385°E	03:30	Unknown	Unknown
IF1	Damage occurred to structures and cars. Trees were snapped or uprooted.						
IF1.5	Suluca	Edirne	Turkey	40.683°N 26.467°E	04:20	Unknown	Unknown
IF1.5	Cars and roofs were damaged. Trees were snapped or uprooted and large tree branches were downed.						
IF1	SW of Karaburun	İzmir	Turkey	38.560°N 26.391°E	05:05	Unknown	Unknown
IF1	Roofs across Küçükbahçe were damaged, caravans were overturned, and a water tank was thrown by the tornado.						

=== 8 January event ===
List of confirmed tornadoes – Monday, 8 January 2024
IF#	Location	Region	Country	Start coord.	Time (UTC)	Path length	Max. width
IF0.5	SE of Mavikent	Antalya	Turkey	36.281°N 30.356°E	14:15	Unknown	Unknown
IF0.5	Tornado formed over sea and made landfall near Aktaş damaging greenhouses and crops.						

=== 9 January event ===
List of confirmed tornadoes – Tuesday, 9 January 2024
IF#	Location	Region	Country	Start coord.	Time (UTC)	Path length	Max. width
IF0.5	Konaklı	Antalya	Turkey	36.594°N 31.896°E	11:30	Unknown	Unknown
IF0.5	A tornado tracked through Konaklı, damaging crops and greenhouses, uprooting or snapping trees and downing tree branches.						

=== 10 January event ===
List of confirmed tornadoes – Wednesday, 10 January 2024
IF#	Location	Region	Country	Start coord.	Time (UTC)	Path length	Max. width
IF0.5	N of Marina di Ragusa	Sicily	Italy	36.813°N 14.552°E	14:30	Unknown	Unknown
IF0.5	A brief tornado damaged some greenhouses and roofs.						

=== 11 January event ===
List of confirmed tornadoes – Thursday, 11 January 2024
IF#	Location	Region	Country	Start coord.	Time (UTC)	Path length	Max. width
IF0.5	W of Al-Karimah	Tartus	Syria	34.65°N 35.98°E	01:50	Unknown	Unknown
IF0.5	A tornado, which likely originated as a waterspout, damaged a few greenhouses.						

=== 12 January event ===
List of confirmed tornadoes – Friday, 12 January 2024
IF#	Location	Region	Country	Start coord.	Time (UTC)	Path length	Max. width
IF0.5	E of Al-Hamidiyah	Tartus	Syria	34.714°N 35.983°E	07:50	Unknown	Unknown
IF0.5	Greenhouses were damaged.						

=== 17 January event ===
List of confirmed tornadoes – Wednesday, 17 January 2024
IF#	Location	Region	Country	Start coord.	Time (UTC)	Path length	Max. width
IF1	S of Cambados	Galicia	Spain	42.466°N 8.817°W	11:00	12 km (7.5 mi)	Unknown
IF1	A waterspout moved onshore damaging roofs of several buildings and greenhouses. Some trees were snapped and uprooted.						

=== 21 January event ===
List of confirmed tornadoes – Sunday, 21 January 2024
IF#	Location	Region	Country	Start coord.	Time (UTC)	Path length	Max. width
IF0.5	Aşağıkocayatak	Antalya	Turkey	36.911°N 30.959°E	10:45	Unknown	Unknown
IF0.5	Tornado damaging greenhouses.						

=== 22 January event ===
List of confirmed tornadoes – Monday, 22 January 2024
IF#	Location	Region	Country	Start coord.	Time (UTC)	Path length	Max. width
IF0.5	Ayia Napa	Famagusta	Cyprus	34.992°N 34.000°E	19:47	Unknown	Unknown
IF0.5	A waterspout came ashore and caused damage in Ayia Napa, mainly to roofs and trees.						

=== 26 January event ===
List of confirmed tornadoes – Friday, 26 January 2024
IF#	Location	Region	Country	Start coord.	Time (UTC)	Path length	Max. width
IF0.5	W of Al-Karimah	Tartus	Syria	34.650°N 36.000°E	03:15	Unknown	Unknown
IF0.5	Greenhouses were damaged in Banī Na'īm and nearby settlements.						

=== 30 January event ===
List of confirmed tornadoes – Tuesday, 30 January 2024
IF#	Location	Region	Country	Start coord.	Time (UTC)	Path length	Max. width
IF1	Famagusta	Famagusta	Cyprus	35.108°N 33.958°E	07:00	Unknown	Unknown
IF1	This tornado damaged greenhouses, blew a roof off a building and damaged power lines.						
IF1.5	Trikomo	Famagusta	Cyprus	35.247°N 33.902°E	10:45	Unknown	Unknown
IF1.5	Large waterspout moved ashore and caused damage to caravans and roofs.						
IF1	Lapithos	Kyrenia	Cyprus	35.353°N 33.162°E	14:00	Unknown	Unknown
IF1	Waterspout moved ashore and damaged a shipyard.						

== February ==
IFU	IF0	IF0.5	IF1	IF1.5	IF2	IF2.5	IF3	IF4	IF5	Total
2	1	1	2	2	1	0	0	0	0	8

=== 11 February event ===
List of confirmed tornadoes – Sunday, 11 February 2024
IF#	Location	Region	Country	Start coord.	Time (UTC)	Path length	Max. width
IF0	Campora San Giovanni	Calabria	Italy	39.073°N 16.084°E	11:50	Unknown	Unknown
IF0	A bar had its furniture shifted.						

=== 12 February event ===
List of confirmed tornadoes – Monday, 12 February 2024
IF#	Location	Region	Country	Start coord.	Time (UTC)	Path length	Max. width
IF1	Rhodes	South Aegean	Greece	36.435°N 28.239°E	18:20	Unknown	Unknown
IF1	A waterspout damaged ships in a marina before moving onshore.						

=== 14 February event ===
List of confirmed tornadoes – Wednesday, 14 February 2024
IF#	Location	Region	Country	Start coord.	Time (UTC)	Path length	Max. width
IF1.5	Germasogeia	Paniotis	Cyprus	34.718°N 33.080°E	01:00	Unknown	Unknown
IF1.5	A tornado struck Germasogeia, causing major damage across the area. Around two hundred homes and apartments were affected, with five families displaced and temporarily housed in hotels. One person was injured and hospitalized. Numerous trees were uprooted, about twenty-five vehicles were damaged or destroyed, and a crane collapsed. Power outages occurred due to damage to the electrical network, and several roads were temporarily closed because of debris and fallen signs.						

=== 16 February event ===
List of confirmed tornadoes – Friday, 16 February 2024
IF#	Location	Region	Country	Start coord.	Time (UTC)	Path length	Max. width
IFU	N of Khana Sor, IQ	Al-Hasakah	Syria	36.63°N 41.61°E	11:30	Unknown	Unknown
IFU	A tornado was observed.						

=== 19 February event ===
List of confirmed tornadoes – Monday, 19 February 2024
IF#	Location	Region	Country	Start coord.	Time (UTC)	Path length	Max. width
IF1	SE of Harbiye	Hatay	Turkey	36.022°N 36.32°E	06:15	Unknown	Unknown
IF1	This tornado snapped or uprooted approximately forty olive trees in farmlands.						

=== 23 February event ===
List of confirmed tornadoes – Friday, 23 February 2024
IF#	Location	Region	Country	Start coord.	Time (UTC)	Path length	Max. width
IF1.5	SW of Saint-Sernin	Nouvelle-Aquitaine	France	44.700°N 0.233°E	12:30	13 km (8.1 mi)	150 m (160 yd)
IF1.5	This rain-wrapped tornado caused significant localized damage, tearing a part of a roof from a home and partially removing the roof from a barn. Around twenty to thirty trees were uprooted, and a horse was severely injured.						

=== 24 February event ===
List of confirmed tornadoes – Saturday, 24 February 2024
IF#	Location	Region	Country	Start coord.	Time (UTC)	Path length	Max. width
IFU	S of Carpi	Emilia-Romagna	Italy	44.750°N 10.892°E	14:20	Unknown	Unknown
IFU	A funnel cloud was reported which caused no known damage.						

== March ==
IFU	IF0	IF0.5	IF1	IF1.5	IF2	IF2.5	IF3	IF4	IF5	Total
3	0	4	9	3	1	0	0	0	0	20

=== 3 March event ===
List of confirmed tornadoes – Sunday, 3 March 2024
IF#	Location	Region	Country	Start coord.	Time (UTC)	Path length	Max. width
IF0.5	Nice	Provence-Alpes-Côte d'Azur	France	43.700°N 7.250°E	00:30	Unknown	Unknown
IF0.5	Trees were uprooted and snapped along with large branches.						
IFU	Finale Ligure	Liguria	Italy	44.173°N 8.367°E	13:55	Unknown	Unknown
IFU	No known damage was caused by the tornado.						

=== 5 March event ===
List of confirmed tornadoes – Tuesday, 5 March 2024
IF#	Location	Region	Country	Start coord.	Time (UTC)	Path length	Max. width
IF1	Demre	Antalya	Turkey	36.23°N 29.999°E	13:40	Unknown	Unknown
IF1	This was a waterspout which moved ashore, causing damage to greenhouses and utility poles. About 175 decares were damaged.						
IF1	Kumluca	Antalya	Turkey	36.350°N 30.275°E	14:15	12 km (7.5 mi)	80 m (87 yd)
IF1	A tornado struck the town of Kumluca, injuring six people as it moved inland after developing over water. The tornado damaged and partially destroyed numerous greenhouses. A mobile construction container was shifted, and solar panels were lifted and thrown.						
IF1.5	Villeneuve-sur-Lot	Nouvelle-Aquitaine	France	44.400°N 0.717°E	16:10	5.3 km (3.3 mi)	90 m (98 yd)
IF1.5	This very brief tornado caused damage to several houses, industrial buildings, hangars, and sports facilities. Numerous trees were uprooted, and a car was lifted by the winds before the tornado quickly dissipated.						
IF1.5	Fauroux	Occitania	France	44.250°N 1.000°E	16:20	5.6 km (3.5 mi)	200 m (220 yd)
IF1.5	A brief tornado inflicted damage to roofs and trees.						
IF1	Payallar	Antalya	Turkey	36.615°N 31.850°E	17:00	Unknown	Unknown
IF1	This tornado struck Payallar, damaging greenhouses and a construction site. Three people were injured.						
IF1.5	Cahors	Occitania	France	44.449°N 1.437°E	19:00	4.8 km (3.0 mi)	150 m (160 yd)
IF1.5	A brief tornado around caused minor structural and object damage. Road signs were bent, trash cans were lifted, and part of a ceiling collapsed.						

=== 6 March event ===
List of confirmed tornadoes – Wednesday, 6 March 2024
IF#	Location	Region	Country	Start coord.	Time (UTC)	Path length	Max. width
IFU	SE of Tuscania	Lazio	Italy	42.382°N 11.968°E	09:26	Unknown	Unknown
IFU	A tornado likely occurred but no damage was reported.						

=== 10 March event ===
List of confirmed tornadoes – Sunday, 10 March 2024
IF#	Location	Region	Country	Start coord.	Time (UTC)	Path length	Max. width
IF1	Sausset-les-Pins	Provence-Alpes-Côte d'Azur	France	43.333°N 5.117°E	01:00	Unknown	Unknown
IF1	This tornado damaged approximately forty homes, fifteen of them significantly. Cars were damaged, tiles were torn off and trees were snapped or uprooted.						
IF1	E of Marmirolo	Lombardy	Italy	45.212°N 10.797°E	12:40	5.8 km (3.6 mi)	200 m (220 yd)
IF1	A tornado caused damage to several properties, destroying a sheet metal fence and scattering debris between homes. Construction containers were flipped, rooftiles and antennas were blown off, and industrial buildings sustained heavy roof damage. Small trees and poles were downed, while debris and trash containers were tossed around the area.						

=== 11 March event ===
List of confirmed tornadoes – Monday, 11 March 2024
IF#	Location	Region	Country	Start coord.	Time (UTC)	Path length	Max. width
IF0.5	SW of Pontinia	Lazio	Italy	41.381°N 12.991°E	13:00	2.4 km (1.5 mi)	40 m (44 yd)
IF0.5	A greenhouse partially collapsed and other greenhouse covers were ripped off. Some parts of other structures collapsed and were lofted.						

=== 12 March event ===
List of confirmed tornadoes – Tuesday, 12 March 2024
IF#	Location	Region	Country	Start coord.	Time (UTC)	Path length	Max. width
IF0.5	Missolonghi	Western Greece	Greece	38.375°N 21.436°E	02:15	Unknown	Unknown
IF0.5	A tornado occurred in Missolonghi, causing damage to roofs, windows, trees, and a cemetery.						

=== 19 March event ===
List of confirmed tornadoes – Tuesday, 19 March 2024
IF#	Location	Region	Country	Start coord.	Time (UTC)	Path length	Max. width
IF1	SW of Brummanet al-Mashayekh	Tartus	Syria	35.004°N 36.144°E	15:45	Unknown	Unknown
IF1	A tornado downed or snapped trees and power lines.						

=== 21 March event ===
List of confirmed tornadoes – Thursday, 21 March 2024
IF#	Location	Region	Country	Start coord.	Time (UTC)	Path length	Max. width
IF1	Landsberg am Lech	Bavaria	Germany	48.048°N 10.883°E	13:40	5.2 km (3.2 mi)	130 m (140 yd)
IF1	The tornado directly struck the industrial area of Landsberg am Lech, damaging several structures and a nearby forest.						

=== 23 March event ===
List of confirmed tornadoes – Saturday, 23 March 2024
IF#	Location	Region	Country	Start coord.	Time (UTC)	Path length	Max. width
IF1	W of Kefenrod	Hesse	Germany	50.350°N 9.167°E	13:27	1.3 km (0.81 mi)	140 m (150 yd)
IF1	Several buildings in Bindsachsen sustained roof damage and trees were damaged.						
IF0.5	S of Basiliano	Friuli-Venezia Giulia	Italy	45.98°N 13.12°E	17:51	3.7 km (2.3 mi)	40 m (44 yd)
IF0.5	A tornado caused minor damage along its path, ripping off light barn roofing, displacing some roof tiles, and flattening crops. Branches and small trees were downed, but no major structural impacts were reported.						

=== 27 March event ===
List of confirmed tornadoes – Wednesday, 27 March 2024
IF#	Location	Region	Country	Start coord.	Time (UTC)	Path length	Max. width
IFU	Verona	Veneto	Italy	45.448°N 11.020°E	12:54	Unknown	Unknown
IFU	A weak tornado caused no known damage.						
IF1	Challans	Pays de la Loire	France	46.834°N 1.848°W	18:42	2.5 km (1.6 mi)	100 m (110 yd)
IF1	A tornado damaged at least ten houses in Challans.						
IF2	Île d'Yeu	Pays de la Loire	France	46.724°N 2.360°W	19:03	Unknown	Unknown
IF2	This strong tornado caused extensive damage, snapping numerous trees, toppling electric poles, and damaging around sixty building roofs along its path.						

== April ==
IFU	IF0	IF0.5	IF1	IF1.5	IF2	IF2.5	IF3	IF4	IF5	Total
11	1	4	8	6	0	0	0	0	0	30

=== 1 April event ===
List of confirmed tornadoes – Monday, 1 April 2024
IF#	Location	Region	Country	Start coord.	Time (UTC)	Path length	Max. width
IF1	W of Fontaniva	Veneto	Italy	45.637°N 11.723°E	19:00	8.94 km (5.56 mi)	200 m (220 yd)
IF1	This tornado caused roof and crop damage, partially collapsing a few weaker buildings and downing trees and branches. Unusual debris movement was noted, including a carpenter’s saw hanging from a tree, a plastic playhouse deposited on a roof, and large water tanks carried several hundred meters.						

=== 4 April event ===
List of confirmed tornadoes – Thursday, 4 April 2024
IF#	Location	Region	Country	Start coord.	Time (UTC)	Path length	Max. width
IF1.5	Korschenbroich	North Rhine-Westphalia	Germany	51.191°N 6.514°E	14:10	5.6 km (3.5 mi)	120 m (130 yd)
IF1.5	A brief tornado tracked through Korschenbroich, damaging many roofs and trees. One roof was heavily damaged.						
IF1	SW of Vitrimont	Grand Est	France	48.594°N 6.422°E	14:30	2.5 km (1.6 mi)	150 m (160 yd)
IF1	This tornado did damage to a forest, snapping or uprooting several trees.						
IF1	Schirmitz	Bavaria	Germany	49.650°N 12.167°E	16:30	1.35 km (0.84 mi)	Unknown
IF1	A tornado damaged approximately twenty roofs. Cars were damaged and a few trees were snapped or uprooted.						
IF1.5	E of Berching	Bavaria	Germany	49.117°N 11.500°E	16:45	4.1 km (2.5 mi)	150 m (160 yd)
IF1.5	A tornado caused considerable damage to trees and buildings in Wackersberg, Holnstein and Staufersbuch.						

=== 5 April event ===
List of confirmed tornadoes – Friday, 5 April 2024
IF#	Location	Region	Country	Start coord.	Time (UTC)	Path length	Max. width
IF1	Waren	Mecklenburg-Vorpommern	Germany	53.481°N 12.712°E	17:17	4.2 km (2.6 mi)	150 m (160 yd)
IF1	This tornado snapped or uprooted tens of trees and downed large branches in a forest.						

=== 8 April event ===
List of confirmed tornadoes – Monday, 8 April 2024
IF#	Location	Region	Country	Start coord.	Time (UTC)	Path length	Max. width
IFU	NE of Brummanet al-Mashayekh	Hama	Syria	35.033°N 36.204°E	09:00	Unknown	Unknown
IFU	A tornado was observed.						
IFU	Hamitköy	Nicosia	Cyprus	35.240°N 33.392°E	10:50	Unknown	Unknown
IFU	A landspout was photographed.						
IF1	Lestrem	Hauts-de-France	France	50.617°N 2.683°E	19:00	6.1 km (3.8 mi)	100 m (110 yd)
IF1	This tornado inflicted heavy damage in Lestrem and surrounding areas. Roofs were torn, walls of buildings were collapsed, trailers were overturned, trees were snapped or uprooted and branches were broken.						

=== 15 April event ===
List of confirmed tornadoes – Monday, 15 April 2024
IF#	Location	Region	Country	Start coord.	Time (UTC)	Path length	Max. width
IF1.5	Knutton	Staffordshire	United Kingdom	53.018°N 2.244°W	05:33	Unknown	Unknown
IF1.5	A brief tornado occurred overturned a caravan.						
IF1	West Bridgford	Nottinghamshire	United Kingdom	52.919°N 1.131°W	06:34	Unknown	Unknown
IF1	Numerous roof sheathings and chimneys were damaged.						
IF1	NW of Wassenberg	North Rhine-Westphalia	Germany	51.131°N 6.101°E	14:05	5.6 km (3.5 mi)	360 m (390 yd)
IF1	Roofs and trees sustained damage.						

=== 16 April event ===
List of confirmed tornadoes – Tuesday, 16 April 2024
IF#	Location	Region	Country	Start coord.	Time (UTC)	Path length	Max. width
IFU	SSW of Kozelets	Chernihiv	Ukraine	50.866°N 31.071°E	15:20	Unknown	Unknown
IFU	This tornado was observed near Yerkiv.						

=== 17 April event ===
List of confirmed tornadoes – Wednesday, 17 April 2024
IF#	Location	Region	Country	Start coord.	Time (UTC)	Path length	Max. width
IF0.5	Slagharen	Overijssel	Netherlands	52.629°N 6.556°E	13:25	2.4 km (1.5 mi)	Unknown
IF0.5	This landspout slightly damaged roofs.						
IF0.5	SW of Musile di Piave	Veneto	Italy	45.598°N 12.553°E	14:45	0.15 km (0.093 mi)	20 m (22 yd)

=== 20 April event ===
List of confirmed tornadoes – Saturday, 20 April 2024
IF#	Location	Region	Country	Start coord.	Time (UTC)	Path length	Max. width
IF1.5	E of Marmaris	Muğla	Turkey	36.854°N 28.289°E	06:00	2 km (1.2 mi)	Unknown
IF1.5	Roofs of buildings were destroyed or damaged.						
IF0	Kumluca	Antalya	Turkey	36.332°N 30.269°E	06:00	Unknown	Unknown
IF0	Some damage was inflicted to greenhouses and crops.						
IFU	S of Monastier di Treviso	Veneto	Italy	45.649°N 12.428°E	12:15	Unknown	Unknown
IFU	A brief landspout lofted light objects but caused no damage.						
IFU	SE of Trigolo	Lombardy	Italy	45.320°N 9.842°E	13:30	Unknown	Unknown
IFU	This landspout caused no damage.						
IF0.5	Torre del Greco	Campania	Italy	40.767°N 14.403°E	18:14	0.6 km (0.37 mi)	70 m (77 yd)
IF0.5	A tornado damaged some greenhouses and a roof.						

=== 22 April event ===
List of confirmed tornadoes – Monday, 22 April 2024
IF#	Location	Region	Country	Start coord.	Time (UTC)	Path length	Max. width
IFU	N of Civitavecchia	Lazio	Italy	42.122°N 11.766°E	07:13	Unknown	Unknown
IFU	A waterspout made landfall, causing no damage.						
IFU	N of Halefoğlu	Kars	Turkey	40.670°N 43.290°E	13:00	Unknown	Unknown
IFU	This weak tornado tracked over grasslands. No damage occurred.						

=== 23 April event ===
List of confirmed tornadoes – Tuesday, 23 April 2024
IF#	Location	Region	Country	Start coord.	Time (UTC)	Path length	Max. width
IFU	N of Adria	Veneto	Italy	45.095°N 12.033°E	11:20	Unknown	Unknown
IFU	A tornado was observed and photographed. No damage occurred.						
IFU	ENE of Massa Fiscaglia	Emilia-Romagna	Italy	44.826°N 12.050°E	13:10	Unknown	Unknown
IFU	A tornado was observed and caused no damage.						
IFU	SW of Santa Perpètua de Mogoda	Catalonia	Spain	41.525°N 2.175°E	14:50	Unknown	Unknown
IFU	A weak tornado lofted dust and sand.						

=== 25 April event ===
List of confirmed tornadoes – Thursday, 25 April 2024
IF#	Location	Region	Country	Start coord.	Time (UTC)	Path length	Max. width
IFU	Ulanbel area	Jambyl	Kazakhstan	44.828°N 71.132°E	12:00	Unknown	Unknown
IFU	A landspout occurred.						

=== 27 April event ===
List of confirmed tornadoes – Saturday, 27 April 2024
IF#	Location	Region	Country	Start coord.	Time (UTC)	Path length	Max. width
IF1.5	Saint-Paul-lès-Dax	Nouvelle-Aquitaine	France	43.733°N 1.050°W	13:00	4.1 km (2.5 mi)	80 m (87 yd)
IF1.5	This tornado snapped several pine trees in half and damaged vehicles and roofs. Some trees also fell onto buildings, damaging roofs.						
IF1	Mazières-de-Touraine	Centre-Val de Loire	France	47.383°N 0.433°E	13:15	3.5 km (2.2 mi)	100 m (110 yd)
IF1	An agricultural building was damaged and numerous trees were snapped or uprooted.						
IF0.5	Saint-Sylvain-d'Anjou	Pays de la Loire	France	47.517°N 0.467°W	15:30	1.2 km (0.75 mi)	Unknown
IF0.5	Roofs, fences and cars were damaged.						

=== 30 April event ===
List of confirmed tornadoes – Tuesday, 30 April 2024
IF#	Location	Region	Country	Start coord.	Time (UTC)	Path length	Max. width
IF1.5	ENE of El Fedjoudj	Guelma	Algeria	35.729°N 6.877°E	12:40	Unknown	Unknown
IF1.5	This tornado struck Ben Nhineh, damaging roofs and killing livestock.						

== May ==
IFU	IF0	IF0.5	IF1	IF1.5	IF2	IF2.5	IF3	IF4	IF5	Total
22	4	10	4	6	1	0	0	0	0	47

=== 1 May event ===
List of confirmed tornadoes – Wednesday, 1 May 2024
IF#	Location	Region	Country	Start coord.	Time (UTC)	Path length	Max. width
IF1.5	S of Gemerek	Sivas	Turkey	39.136°N 36.063°E	13:55	Unknown	Unknown
IF1.5	Pine trees were downed and snapped.						

=== 2 May event ===
List of confirmed tornadoes – Thursday, 2 May 2024
IF#	Location	Region	Country	Start coord.	Time (UTC)	Path length	Max. width
IF0.5	Robbio	Lombardy	Italy	45.285°N 8.602°E	09:58	Unknown	Unknown
IF0.5	This weak tornado caused minor damage, overturning large trash containers and lofting light objects. The fence of a tennis court was damaged as wind pressure against the netting bent and ruined several poles.						
IF1.5	NW of Roveredo di Guà	Veneto	Italy	45.278°N 11.430°E	14:05	1.6 km (0.99 mi)	40 m (44 yd)
IF1.5	A tornado downed a tree and street sign, blew plastic containers around, shifted tubes, and removed a roof.						

=== 3 May event ===
List of confirmed tornadoes – Friday, 3 May 2024
IF#	Location	Region	Country	Start coord.	Time (UTC)	Path length	Max. width
IFU	N of Nea Kessani	Eastern Macedonia and Thrace	Greece	41.057°N 25.069°E	10:30	Unknown	Unknown
IFU	A tornado was observed.						

=== 6 May event ===
List of confirmed tornadoes – Monday, 6 May 2024
IF#	Location	Region	Country	Start coord.	Time (UTC)	Path length	Max. width
IFU	Jivno	South Bohemia	Czech Republic	49.000°N 14.563°E	13:05	Unknown	Unknown
IFU	A landspout tornado occurred.						
IF0.5	Kursk	Kursk	Russia	51.642°N 36.142°E	15:10	6 km (3.7 mi)	Unknown
IF0.5	Several trees were damaged.						

=== 7 May event ===
List of confirmed tornadoes – Tuesday, 7 May 2024
IF#	Location	Region	Country	Start coord.	Time (UTC)	Path length	Max. width
IF1.5	ENE of Yefremov	Tula	Russia	53.173°N 38.203°E	10:40	3.9 km (2.4 mi)	160 m (170 yd)
IF1.5	This tornado did severe damage to homes in Novokrasivoye.						
IF0.5	Muggia	Friuli-Venezia Giulia	Italy	45.605°N 13.765°E	11:45	1.9 km (1.2 mi)	Unknown
IF0.5	A tornado lofted rooftiles, snapped branches and tossed light objects. The tornado possibly started in Slovenia.						

=== 12 May event ===
List of confirmed tornadoes – Sunday, 12 May 2024
IF#	Location	Region	Country	Start coord.	Time (UTC)	Path length	Max. width
IF0.5	Söğütlü	Erzurum	Turkey	39.882°N 41.108°E	10:10	Unknown	Unknown
IF0.5	This tornado struck Söğütlü, damaging seven houses, a school, three greenhouses, and three vehicles. Beekeepers’ hives were also affected, and high-voltage power lines were damaged, disrupting electricity in the area.						
IFU	WNW of Kırklareli	Kırklareli	Turkey	41.750°N 27.167°E	12:45	Unknown	Unknown
IFU	A tornado was observed in the Eriklice area and didn't cause damage.						

=== 14 May event ===
List of confirmed tornadoes – Tuesday, 14 May 2024
IF#	Location	Region	Country	Start coord.	Time (UTC)	Path length	Max. width
IF0.5	S of Ruvo di Puglia	Apulia	Italy	41.074°N 16.479°E	12:10	Unknown	Unknown
IF0.5	A tree was downed on a fence and across a road.						

=== 16 May event ===
List of confirmed tornadoes – Thursday, 16 May 2024
IF#	Location	Region	Country	Start coord.	Time (UTC)	Path length	Max. width
IF1.5	SW of Sant Climent Sescebes	Catalonia	Spain	42.343°N 2.958°E	11:45	Unknown	Unknown
IF1.5	A pig farm was struck, destroying the roof and a wall on the building. Forty pigs were killed.						
IF0.5	SSW of Guastalla	Emilia-Romagna	Italy	44.866°N 10.631°E	15:30	2.2 km (1.4 mi)	50 m (55 yd)
IF0.5	This weak tornado caused damage to several structures, including the roofs of a cemetery building, two industrial facilities, and a farm outbuilding. Weak trees were downed, branches were snapped, crops were flattened, and a truck was displaced.						
IF2	SE of Villa Poma	Lombardy	Italy	44.992°N 11.123°E	16:40	2.6 km (1.6 mi)	100 m (110 yd)
IF2	A strong tornado caused significant disruption, overturning trains and collapsing a tower. It also damaged several roofs and greenhouses, blew over a small container and dragged another, snapped trees and branches, and flattened crops along its path.						

=== 18 May event ===
List of confirmed tornadoes – Saturday, 18 May 2024
IF#	Location	Region	Country	Start coord.	Time (UTC)	Path length	Max. width
IF0	SW of Loigny-la-Bataille	Centre-Val de Loire	France	48.119°N 1.731°E	14:15	0.8 km (0.50 mi)	20 m (22 yd)
IF0	A landspout damaged crops.						
IF0.5	Velké Březno	Ústí nad Labem	Czech Republic	50.667°N 14.129°E	14:40	Unknown	Unknown
IF0.5	This landspout lofted some bricks.						

=== 19 May event ===
List of confirmed tornadoes – Sunday, 19 May 2024
IF#	Location	Region	Country	Start coord.	Time (UTC)	Path length	Max. width
IFU	SSE of Żarowo	West Pomeranian	Poland	53.373°N 15.006°E	14:03	Unknown	Unknown
IFU	A landspout was observed.						

=== 20 May event ===
List of confirmed tornadoes – Monday, 20 May 2024
IF#	Location	Region	Country	Start coord.	Time (UTC)	Path length	Max. width
IFU	SE of Inčukalns	Sigulda	Latvia	57.064°N 24.845°E	12:00	Unknown	Unknown
IFU	A tornado occurred over a field.						
IFU	Ostrhauderfehn	Lower Saxony	Germany	53.150°N 7.617°E	12:13	Unknown	Unknown
IFU	A non-mesocylonic tornado was observed.						
IFU	E of Borgo Vercelli	Piedmont	Italy	45.354°N 8.549°E	15:39	Unknown	Unknown
IFU	This landspout caused no damage.						

=== 21 May event ===
List of confirmed tornadoes – Tuesday, 21 May 2024
IF#	Location	Region	Country	Start coord.	Time (UTC)	Path length	Max. width
IF1	Schattendorf	Burgenland	Austria	47.714°N 16.501°E	12:30	0.1 km (0.062 mi)	Unknown
IF1	A mobile home was shifted and roofs and trees were lightly damaged.						
IFU	Trignac	Pays de la Loire	France	47.317°N 2.183°W	13:15	Unknown	Unknown
IFU	A brief tornado was photographed by several people. No damage occurred.						
IFU	W of Gülşehir	Nevşehir	Turkey	38.747°N 34.595°E	13:45	Unknown	Unknown
IFU	A tornado moved through agricultural lands causing no damage.						
IF1	Graz	Styria	Austria	47.074°N 15.401°E	15:08	2.3 km (1.4 mi)	Unknown
IF1	The roofs of some buildings were damaged and multiple trees were uprooted, one of which fell on a car.						

=== 22 May event ===
List of confirmed tornadoes – Wednesday, 22 May 2024
IF#	Location	Region	Country	Start coord.	Time (UTC)	Path length	Max. width
IFU	Kružno area	Banská Bystrica	Slovakia	48.412°N 19.931°E	14:00	Unknown	Unknown
IFU	A tornado remained over open land.						
IFU	WNW of Magliano Sabina	Lazio	Italy	42.375°N 12.447°E	16:25	Unknown	Unknown
IFU	This tornado lofted debris but no damage was noted.						

=== 24 May event ===
List of confirmed tornadoes – Friday, 24 May 2024
IF#	Location	Region	Country	Start coord.	Time (UTC)	Path length	Max. width
IFU	Rákóczifalva	Jász–Nagykun–Szolnok	Hungary	47.069°N 20.222°E	09:15	Unknown	Unknown
IFU	A tornado was observed.						
IFU	SW of Eğriağaç	Adana	Turkey	36.770°N 35.440°E	12:30	Unknown	Unknown
IFU	This tornado was documented over open lands.						

=== 25 May event ===
List of confirmed tornadoes – Saturday, 25 May 2024
IF#	Location	Region	Country	Start coord.	Time (UTC)	Path length	Max. width
IF1.5	NE of Koygorodok	Komi	Russia	60.533°N 51.423°E	10:15	3.95 km (2.45 mi)	370 m (400 yd)
IF1.5	A tornado scar was noted on Sentinel-2 satellite imagery.						
IFU	Avanduse (1st tornado)	Lääne-Viru	Estonia	59.053°N 26.421°E	12:36	Unknown	Unknown
IFU	The first of two landspouts that occurred simultaneously. No damage occurred.						
IFU	Avanduse (2nd tornado)	Lääne-Viru	Estonia	59.053°N 26.421°E	12:36	Unknown	Unknown
IFU	The second of two landspouts that occurred simultaneously. No damage occurred.						
IF0.5	Riga	Riga	Latvia	56.960°N 24.110°E	14:42	Unknown	Unknown
IF0.5	This brief tornado snapped tree branches and trees..						

=== 27 May event ===
List of confirmed tornadoes – Monday, 27 May 2024
IF#	Location	Region	Country	Start coord.	Time (UTC)	Path length	Max. width
IF0.5	N of Arentsminde	North Jutland	Denmark	57.147°N 9.608°E	10:05	0.2 km (0.12 mi)	50 m (55 yd)
IF0.5	This brief tornado damaged a few trees in a forest and tracked through fields.						
IFU	S of Kulaigyr	Karaganda	Kazakhstan	49.089°N 72.937°E	12:45	Unknown	Unknown
IFU	A tornado was photographed in Daryinskiy. No damage was reported.						

=== 28 May event ===
List of confirmed tornadoes – Tuesday, 28 May 2024
IF#	Location	Region	Country	Start coord.	Time (UTC)	Path length	Max. width
IFU	E of Ostellato (1st tornado)	Emilia-Romagna	Italy	44.734°N 12.050°E	09:20	Unknown	Unknown
IFU	A landspout caused no damage.						
IFU	E of Ostellato (2nd tornado)	Emilia-Romagna	Italy	44.733°N 12.046°E	09:20	Unknown	Unknown
IFU	A landspout caused no damage.						
IFU	SW of Târgușor	Constanța	Romania	44.452°N 28.367°E	11:30	Unknown	Unknown
IFU	A tornado was observed.						

=== 29 May event ===
List of confirmed tornadoes – Wednesday, 29 May 2024
IF#	Location	Region	Country	Start coord.	Time (UTC)	Path length	Max. width
IF0	E of Leverano	Apulia	Italy	40.289°N 18.031°E	11:00	Unknown	Unknown
IF0	A landspout tossed a plastic sheet and light debris.						
IF1.5	Hagen	North Rhine-Westphalia	Germany	51.369°N 7.495°E	14:02	7.5 km (4.7 mi)	230 m (250 yd)
IF1.5	This tornado tracked through Hagen, damaging buildings and cars and uprooting or snapping trees.						
IF1	Atlegach	Bashkortostan	Russia	56.060°N 55.050°E	14:50	0.5 km (0.31 mi)	30 m (33 yd)
IF1	Trees were downed and buildings were damaged.						
IF0.5	N of Supino	Lazio	Italy	41.632°N 12.232°E	15:10	Unknown	Unknown
IF0.5	At least two homes suffered slight roof damage from a tornado.						

=== 30 May event ===
List of confirmed tornadoes – Thursday, 30 May 2024
IF#	Location	Region	Country	Start coord.	Time (UTC)	Path length	Max. width
IFU	NNE of Wallerfing	Bavaria	Germany	48.700°N 12.891°E	13:07	Unknown	Unknown
IFU	A tornado was observed moving through a field.						
IFU	E of Sorø	Zealand	Denmark	55.430°N 11.646°E	13:40	Unknown	Unknown
IFU	A weak tornado was witnessed.						
IF1	N of Moesdorf	Mersch	Luxembourg	49.779°N 6.117°E	14:35	Unknown	Unknown
IF1	Some tree branches were snapped by a brief tornado.						
IF0	Sorø	Zealand	Denmark	55.455°N 11.553°E	15:01	0.2 km (0.12 mi)	80 m (87 yd)
IF0	Minor tree damage occurred.						
IFU	E of Fockendorf	Thuringia	Germany	51.050°N 12.483°E	15:28	Unknown	Unknown
IFU	This tornado lifted some debris but caused no damage.						

=== 31 May event ===
List of confirmed tornadoes – Friday, 31 May 2024
IF#	Location	Region	Country	Start coord.	Time (UTC)	Path length	Max. width
IF0	Beauvais-sur-Matha area	Nouvelle-Aquitaine	France	45.883°N 0.183°W	17:45	1.5 km (0.93 mi)	Unknown
IF0	This tornado damaged crops in a convergent pattern.						

== June ==
IFU	IF0	IF0.5	IF1	IF1.5	IF2	IF2.5	IF3	IF4	IF5	Total
22	4	6	16	6	9	1	0	0	0	64

=== 2 June event ===
List of confirmed tornadoes – Sunday, 2 June 2024
IF#	Location	Region	Country	Start coord.	Time (UTC)	Path length	Max. width
IFU	NNW of Tarcze	Masovian	Poland	52.143°N 22.409°E	09:05	Unknown	Unknown
IFU	A landspout tornado occurred.						
IF1	Bogusze Stare	Podlaskie	Poland	52.573°N 22.671°E	10:15	Unknown	Unknown
IF1	This landspout snapped a tree and damaged roofs.						
IF0	N of Ohorn	Saxony	Germany	51.183°N 14.050°E	11:10	1.1 km (0.68 mi)	Unknown
IF0	A few large tree branches were broken and roofs were damaged.						

=== 3 June event ===
List of confirmed tornadoes – Monday, 3 June 2024
IF#	Location	Region	Country	Start coord.	Time (UTC)	Path length	Max. width
IF2	NW of Ramići	Republika Srpska	Bosnia and Herzegovina	44.886°N 17.134°E	11:55	0.5 km (0.31 mi)	Unknown
IF2	This strong tornado struck near Mišin Han, damaging over twenty houses and destroying at least seven roofs. The most severe damage involved a residential building that lost more than two-thirds of its roof.						

=== 4 June event ===
List of confirmed tornadoes – Tuesday, 4 June 2024
IF#	Location	Region	Country	Start coord.	Time (UTC)	Path length	Max. width
IF2	N of Druzhba	Vladimir	Russia	56.385°N 41.067°E	11:40	12.5 km (7.8 mi)	380 m (420 yd)
IF2	A strong tornado tracked through forested land, downing numerous trees.						
IFU	NE of Ustyluh	Volyn	Ukraine	50.907°N 24.198°E	16:20	Unknown	Unknown
IFU	A landspout was observed.						

=== 5 June event ===
List of confirmed tornadoes – Wednesday, 5 June 2024
IF#	Location	Region	Country	Start coord.	Time (UTC)	Path length	Max. width
IF0.5	Ikast	Central Jutland	Denmark	56.122°N 9.144°E	11:40	2.28 km (1.42 mi)	200 m (220 yd)
IF0.5	This weak tornado touched down in southern Ikast, producing minor damage along its path. Small trees experienced slight debranching, and a greenhouse sustained minor damage. A few trees were uprooted near a football field, including one with a broad but shallow root system in sandy soil. Additional light damage occurred at a nearby roundabout.						

=== 6 June event ===
List of confirmed tornadoes – Thursday, 6 June 2024
IF#	Location	Region	Country	Start coord.	Time (UTC)	Path length	Max. width
IF0	NW of Noordwijkerhout	South Holland	Netherlands	52.302°N 4.473°E	07:00	Unknown	Unknown
IF0	A waterspout made landfall on a beach, blowing fishermen's gear away.						
IFU	W of Nizhniy Tagil	Sverdlovsk	Russia	57.891°N 59.871°E	08:10	Unknown	Unknown
IFU	A tornado was photographed.						
IFU	WNW of Nizhniye Sergi	Sverdlovsk	Russia	56.680°N 59.220°E	08:20	Unknown	Unknown
IFU	A tornado was observed.						

=== 7 June event ===
List of confirmed tornadoes – Friday, 7 June 2024
IF#	Location	Region	Country	Start coord.	Time (UTC)	Path length	Max. width
IF0.5	Borth	Ceredigion	United Kingdom	52.483°N 4.050°W	06:15	Unknown	Unknown
IF0.5	This tornado lifted two campervans into the air and tossed their possessions across a golf course.						
IF1	Berdyuzhye	Tyumen	Russia	55.800°N 68.320°E	07:10	Unknown	Unknown
IF1	A tornado was observed and damaged roofs.						
IFU	Kulebaki	Nizhny Novgorod	Russia	55.413°N 42.532°E	11:30	Unknown	Unknown
IFU	A tornado was photographed.						
IF1	NNE of Tambov	Tambov	Russia	52.829°N 41.543°E	12:15	Unknown	Unknown
IF1	This tornado did damage to numerous trees.						

=== 8 June event ===
List of confirmed tornadoes – Saturday, 8 June 2024
IF#	Location	Region	Country	Start coord.	Time (UTC)	Path length	Max. width
IFU	NW of Ust-Katav	Bashkortostan	Russia	54.960°N 58.080°E	09:40	Unknown	Unknown
IFU	A tornado was observed.						
IFU	E of Hermanivka	Kyiv	Ukraine	49.990°N 30.570°E	10:00	Unknown	Unknown
IFU	A landspout tornado was observed.						
IFU	E of Agapovka	Chelyabinsk	Russia	53.287°N 59.415°E	11:45	Unknown	Unknown
IFU	A tornado was observed.						
IF2.5	S of Abzelilovo	Bashkortostan	Russia	53.460°N 58.660°E	11:50	Unknown	Unknown
IF2.5	This strong tornado tossed a loaded utility truck. The roofs of buildings were also damaged.						
IFU	W of Fershampenuaz	Chelyabinsk	Russia	53.530°N 59.511°E	12:00	Unknown	Unknown
IFU	A tornado was observed.						
IF1.5	Laßnitzthal	Styria	Austria	47.080°N 15.643°E	18:00	0.8 km (0.50 mi)	50 m (55 yd)
IF1.5	This tornado snapped or uprooted several trees.						

=== 9 June event ===
List of confirmed tornadoes – Sunday, 9 June 2024
IF#	Location	Region	Country	Start coord.	Time (UTC)	Path length	Max. width
IF0.5	Liepāja	Liepāja	Latvia	56.517°N 21.017°E	03:50	Unknown	Unknown
IF0.5	A brief tornado snapped tree branches.						
IF2	S of Grosspetersdorf, AT to W of Szombathely, HU	Burgenland (AT), Vas (HU)	Austria, Hungary	56.517°N 21.017°E	03:50	20 km (12 mi)	Unknown
IF2	This strong tornado damaged several homes in Hannersdorf. As the tornado moved east, extensive forest damage was observed near the Austrian-Hungarian borders, including a tree stripped of nearly all branches. The tornado then crossed into Hungary and caused additional roof and outbuilding damage in Narda, with one outbuilding collapsing. The tornado continued northeast toward Szombathely, where the last damage was reported.						

=== 11 June event ===
List of confirmed tornadoes – Tuesday, 11 June 2024
IF#	Location	Region	Country	Start coord.	Time (UTC)	Path length	Max. width
IFU	NE of Kolvitsa	Murmansk	Russia	67.159°N 33.15°E	12:00	Unknown	Unknown
IFU	A rare tornado was observed tracking through forested and hilly terrain north of the Arctic Circle.						

=== 12 June event ===
List of confirmed tornadoes – Wednesday, 12 June 2024
IF#	Location	Region	Country	Start coord.	Time (UTC)	Path length	Max. width
IFU	Yaroslavl	Yaroslavl	Russia	57.587°N 39.867°E	12:20	Unknown	Unknown
IFU	A tornado was recorded in the outskirts of Yaroslavl.						
IFU	Mihajlovo	Central Banat	Serbia	45.480°N 20.394°E	13:05	Unknown	Unknown
IFU	A brief tornado was observed.						

=== 16 June event ===
List of confirmed tornadoes – Sunday, 16 June 2024
IF#	Location	Region	Country	Start coord.	Time (UTC)	Path length	Max. width
IFU	S of Gorshechnoye	Kursk	Russia	51.450°N 38.075°E	16:20	Unknown	Unknown
IFU	A tornado was observed.						

=== 17 June event ===
List of confirmed tornadoes – Monday, 17 June 2024
IF#	Location	Region	Country	Start coord.	Time (UTC)	Path length	Max. width
IFU	SW of Armanis	Lori	Armenia	40.980°N 44.290°E	13:00	Unknown	Unknown
IFU	A tornado was observed.						
IF0	SE of Naro-Fominsk	Moscow	Russia	55.286°N 36.999°E	14:00	Unknown	Unknown
IF0	A brief, weak tornado was observed just outside the outskirts of southwestern Moscow.						
IFU	Domodedovo area	Moscow	Russia	55.442°N 37.758°E	14:20	Unknown	Unknown
IFU	A tornado was photographed.						

=== 18 June event ===
List of confirmed tornadoes – Tuesday, 18 June 2024
IF#	Location	Region	Country	Start coord.	Time (UTC)	Path length	Max. width
IF2	SSE of Borındıq	Tatarstan	Russia	55.448°N 48.515°E	12:10	Unknown	Unknown
IF2	A strong tornado inflicted damage to powerlines and significantly damaged buildings.						
IF2	Carlepont	Hauts-de-France	France	49.517°N 3.017°E	15:15	2 km (1.2 mi)	150 m (160 yd)
IF2	This strong tornado damaged thirty-four buildings in Carlepont, including a barn that was almost completely destroyed.						
IFU	Hanover	Lower Saxony	Germany	52.384°N 9.686°E	16:45	Unknown	Unknown
IFU	A brief tornado was caught on surveillance cameras and caused no damage.						
IF1.5	SW of Alfeld	Lower Saxony	Germany	51.967°N 9.767°E	17:33	4.55 km (2.83 mi)	370 m (400 yd)
IF1.5	This tornado damaged roofs and tracked through forests, snapping or uprooting numerous trees.						
IF1	Bockenem	Lower Saxony	Germany	52.017°N 10.133°E	18:05	6.2 km (3.9 mi)	110 m (120 yd)
IF1	Roof and tree damage occurred.						
IF2	Heere	Lower Saxony	Germany	52.067°N 10.250°E	18:15	5.3 km (3.3 mi)	375 m (410 yd)
IF2	A strong tornado snapped and uprooted numerous trees along with severely debranching some of the trees.						

=== 19 June event ===
List of confirmed tornadoes – Wednesday, 19 June 2024
IF#	Location	Region	Country	Start coord.	Time (UTC)	Path length	Max. width
IF1.5	Chalmazel	Auvergne-Rhône-Alpes	France	45.700°N 3.850°E	14:47	1 km (0.62 mi)	40 m (44 yd)
IF1.5	A narrow tornado uprooted and snapped several trees. One injury occurred.						
IF2	NW of Nevel	Pskov	Russia	56.065°N 29.771°E	17:00	13.7 km (8.5 mi)	540 m (590 yd)
IF2	A strong tornado inflicted significant damage to roofs and vehicles in Pereboevo. Severe tree damage also was noted.						
IF1	NE of Nevel	Pskov	Russia	56.054°N 30.031°E	17:15	3.2 km (2.0 mi)	250 m (270 yd)
IF1	This tornado tracked through forest, snapping or uprooting multiple trees and also damaged some roofs.						
IF1	N of Dedovichi	Pskov	Russia	57.583°N 29.951°E	17:25	9 km (5.6 mi)	180 m (200 yd)
IF1	Several roofs were damaged and many trees were downed.						
IF1	SSW of Velikiye Luki	Pskov	Russia	56.103°N 30.360°E	17:30	2.6 km (1.6 mi)	140 m (150 yd)
IF1	This tornado caused tree damage in forested land.						

=== 20 June event ===
List of confirmed tornadoes – Thursday, 20 June 2024
IF#	Location	Region	Country	Start coord.	Time (UTC)	Path length	Max. width
IF2	S of Kubinka	Moscow	Russia	55.530°N 36.695°E	09:35	7 km (4.3 mi)	340 m (370 yd)
IF2	A strong tornado inflicted significant damage to trees.						
IF1.5	SSE of Povarovo	Moscow	Russia	56.046°N 37.105°E	10:10	Unknown	Unknown
IF1.5	This tornado tracked through forested land, snapping or uprooting trees.						
IFU	S of Zelenograd	Moscow	Russia	55.945°N 37.209°E	10:20	Unknown	Unknown
IFU	A tornado was recorded. No known damage occurred.						
IF0	S of Lobnya	Moscow	Russia	55.990°N 37.463°E	10:30	Unknown	Unknown
IF0	This tornado was photographed in forested areas south of Lobnya.						
IF1	E of Touillon	Bourgogne-Franche-Comté	France	47.654°N 4.436°E	16:20	4 km (2.5 mi)	Unknown
IF1	A tornado occurred in Les Malmaisons, damaging roofs of buildings and trees.						
IFU	SW of Ampilly-le-Sec	Bourgogne-Franche-Comté	France	47.800°N 4.517°E	16:30	Unknown	Unknown
IFU	A tornado was observed that did no damage.						
IF1	SE of Touillon	Bourgogne-Franche-Comté	France	47.650°N 4.433°E	16:30	10 km (6.2 mi)	200 m (220 yd)
IF1	This tornado uprooted several trees.						

=== 21 June event ===
List of confirmed tornadoes – Friday, 21 June 2024
IF#	Location	Region	Country	Start coord.	Time (UTC)	Path length	Max. width
IF1	SE of Samara	Samara	Russia	52.933°N 50.650°E	10:00	Unknown	Unknown
IF1	A tornado damaged the roofs of buildings.						
IF0.5	W of Bassignana	Piedmont	Italy	44.998°N 8.714°E	16:30	Unknown	Unknown
IF0.5	Light tree damage occurred.						
IF0.5	W of Brackel	Lower Saxony	Germany	53.300°N 10.033°E	18:55	2.7 km (1.7 mi)	30 m (33 yd)
IF0.5	A tornado damaged trees and crops.						
IF1	N of Hohenhorn	Schleswig-Holstein	Germany	53.483°N 10.367°E	19:41	0.5 km (0.31 mi)	90 m (98 yd)
IF1	Damage to trees and crops was noted.						

=== 22 June event ===
List of confirmed tornadoes – Saturday, 22 June 2024
IF#	Location	Region	Country	Start coord.	Time (UTC)	Path length	Max. width
IFU	Isilkul area	Omsk	Russia	54.915°N 71.268°E	09:40	Unknown	Unknown
IFU	A landspout was observed.						

=== 23 June event ===
List of confirmed tornadoes – Sunday, 23 June 2024
IF#	Location	Region	Country	Start coord.	Time (UTC)	Path length	Max. width
IF1.5	Severny to Yangelskoye	Bashkortostan	Russia	53.260°N 58.779°E	09:40	22 km (14 mi)	Unknown
IF1.5	This tornado moved due north, inflicting severe damage to roofs of buildings and uprooting or snapping hundreds of trees.						

=== 25 June event ===
List of confirmed tornadoes – Tuesday, 25 June 2024
IF#	Location	Region	Country	Start coord.	Time (UTC)	Path length	Max. width
IF1	Rovigo	Veneto	Italy	45.084°N 11.783°E	09:15	7 km (4.3 mi)	90 m (98 yd)
IF1	A tornado caused damage to roofs, crops, warehouses, and storage boxes while downing trees and branches. Several cars were struck by debris, and one person sustained minor injuries.						
IF2	E of Akhmeta	Kakheti	Georgia	42.033°N 45.376°E	13:15	Unknown	Unknown
IF2	This tornado struck the village of Alaverdi, overturning a car and injuring two people. It also damaged the roof of the Alaverdi Monastery before dissipating.						
IFU	N of Ravenna	Emilia-Romagna	Italy	44.488°N 12.170°E	16:00	Unknown	Unknown
IFU	A brief tornado occurred.						

=== 27 June event ===
List of confirmed tornadoes – Thursday, 27 June 2024
IF#	Location	Region	Country	Start coord.	Time (UTC)	Path length	Max. width
IFU	W of Leupoldsdorf	Bavaria	Germany	50.030°N 11.903°E	14:00	Unknown	Unknown
IFU	A tornado occurred over forests.						
IFU	WSW of Ostrówek	Greater Poland	Poland	51.878°N 18.574°E	15:24	Unknown	Unknown
IFU	A brief tornado was observed.						

=== 28 June event ===
List of confirmed tornadoes – Friday, 28 June 2024
IF#	Location	Region	Country	Start coord.	Time (UTC)	Path length	Max. width
IF1	S of Örkelljunga	Skåne	Sweden	56.271°N 13.269°E	12:35	Unknown	75 m (82 yd)
IF1	Trees were snapped and outdoor furniture was blown away.						
IF1	Fjärdhundra area	Uppsala	Sweden	59.773°N 16.932°E	12:45	Unknown	Unknown
IF1	Roofs of buildings and trees were damaged.						
IF1	N of Abborrberget	Södermanland	Sweden	59.481°N 17.045°E	17:50	Unknown	Unknown
IF1	Vehicles were damaged, trees were downed, tree branches were snapped and a roof was blown off.						

=== 29 June event ===
List of confirmed tornadoes – Saturday, 29 June 2024
IF#	Location	Region	Country	Start coord.	Time (UTC)	Path length	Max. width
IF1.5	E of San Ponso	Piedmont	Italy	45.351°N 7.678°E	20:05	1.2 km (0.75 mi)	90 m (98 yd)
IF1.5	This tornado collapsed a wall, damaged roofs, and downed trees and power poles.						

=== 30 June event ===
List of confirmed tornadoes – Sunday, 30 June 2024
IF#	Location	Region	Country	Start coord.	Time (UTC)	Path length	Max. width
IF1	W of Wesenberg	Mecklenburg-Vorpommern	Germany	53.271°N 12.904°E	00:25	2.8 km (1.7 mi)	40 m (44 yd)
IF1	A tornado struck the village of Zirtow, damaging roofs and vehicles. Trees were also snapped or uprooted in and around the village.						
IF0.5	S of Meduna di Livenza	Veneto	Italy	45.804°N 12.621°E	09:00	0.65 km (0.40 mi)	Unknown
IF0.5	Some greenhouses were damaged and other buildings had minor damage done to their roofs.						

== July ==
IFU	IF0	IF0.5	IF1	IF1.5	IF2	IF2.5	IF3	IF4	IF5	Total
18	3	3	10	6	7	0	0	0	0	47

=== 1 July event ===
List of confirmed tornadoes – Monday, 1 July 2024
IF#	Location	Region	Country	Start coord.	Time (UTC)	Path length	Max. width
IF1.5	Cottbus area	Brandenburg	Germany	51.800°N 14.317°E	13:17	6.2 km (3.9 mi)	90 m (98 yd)
IF1.5	A tornado struck Sielow near Cottbus, snapping and uprooting trees in a forest and damaging roofs.						

=== 2 July event ===
List of confirmed tornadoes – Tuesday, 2 July 2024
IF#	Location	Region	Country	Start coord.	Time (UTC)	Path length	Max. width
IFU	E of Capo d'Orlando	Sicily	Italy	38.152°N 14.789°E	10:20	Unknown	Unknown
IFU	A waterspout made landfall, causing no damage.						
IF1	W of Peno	Tver	Russia	56.844°N 32.411°E	12:50	23 km (14 mi)	220 m (240 yd)
IF1	This long-track tornado tore through forests, snapping or uprooting hundreds of trees.						

=== 3 July event ===
List of confirmed tornadoes – Wednesday, 3 July 2024
IF#	Location	Region	Country	Start coord.	Time (UTC)	Path length	Max. width
IF0	NE of Ravenna	Emilia-Romagna	Italy	44.451°N 12.293°E	04:50	Unknown	Unknown
IF0	Beach umbrellas, lawn chairs, tables and other light outdoor objects were tossed around. Canopies and nets were also damaged.						
IF2	Brumath	Grand Est	France	48.711°N 7.707°E	11:18	Unknown	Unknown
IF2	This brief but strong tornado overturned three cars, two of which were moved 15 m (16 yd).						
IF0.5	Philippsburg	Baden-Württemberg	Germany	49.236°N 8.456°E	18:00	1.5 km (0.93 mi)	80 m (87 yd)
IF0.5	Tree and crop damage occurred.						
IF0.5	Lindau	Bavaria	Germany	47.539°N 9.731°E	18:25	Unknown	Unknown
IF0.5	A tornado caused damage in southern Lindau.						

=== 4 July event ===
List of confirmed tornadoes – Thursday, 4 July 2024
IF#	Location	Region	Country	Start coord.	Time (UTC)	Path length	Max. width
IFU	Sejerø	Zealand	Denmark	55.876°N 11.144°E	15:30	Unknown	Unknown
IFU	A waterspout made landfall on the island of Sejerø causing no known damage.						
IF2	E of Karevo to W of Toropets	Pskov, Tver	Russia	56.280°N 31.348°E	17:15	40 km (25 mi)	490 m (540 yd)
IF2	This strong, long-track tornado damaged approximately forty houses in Zhizhitsa and tracked mostly through forests.						
IF1	NW of Toropets	Tver	Russia	56.599°N 31.202°E	17:40	9.5 km (5.9 mi)	310 m (340 yd)
IF1	A tornado damaged houses in Starinka and tracked through forests.						
IF2	NW of Toropets	Tver	Russia	56.752°N 31.244°E	18:00	4.6 km (2.9 mi)	580 m (630 yd)
IF2	A strong tornado ripped through forests.						

=== 5 July event ===
List of confirmed tornadoes – Friday, 5 July 2024
IF#	Location	Region	Country	Start coord.	Time (UTC)	Path length	Max. width
IFU	N of Pskov	Pskov	Russia	57.954°N 27.270°E	10:30	Unknown	Unknown
IFU	A weak tornado occurred within inaccessible forested areas. No damage observed.						
IFU	W of Dmitrov	Moscow	Russia	56.355°N 37.422°E	12:20	Unknown	Unknown
IFU	A tornado was observed.						
IF1	S of Mitrofanovo	Vologda	Russia	60.321°N 37.906°E	16:50	4.1 km (2.5 mi)	250 m (270 yd)
IF1	This tornado damaged roofs and trees.						
IF1	W of Matveyevskaya	Vologda	Russia	60.626°N 37.841°E	17:10	4.1 km (2.5 mi)	120 m (130 yd)
IF1	A tornado damaged forests.						
IFU	Pärnu	Pärnu	Estonia	58.375°N 24.514°E	17:48	Unknown	Unknown
IFU	A waterspout came ashore, knocking some outdoor furniture over.						
IF2	NNE of Bronnitsy	Moscow	Russia	55.469°N 38.298°E	18:00	Unknown	Unknown
IF2	A strong tornado damaged several buildings.						

=== 6 July event ===
List of confirmed tornadoes – Saturday, 6 July 2024
IF#	Location	Region	Country	Start coord.	Time (UTC)	Path length	Max. width
IF0	NE of Søndersø	Southern Denmark	Denmark	55.499°N 10.292°E	13:30	0.78 km (0.48 mi)	15 m (16 yd)
IF0	Crops were flattened and two trees had large branches snapped.						
IF1.5	NE of Otterup	Southern Denmark	Denmark	55.563°N 10.452°E	13:33	0.56 km (0.35 mi)	60 m (66 yd)
IF1.5	A couple of trees were snapped or uprooted.						

=== 7 July event ===
List of confirmed tornadoes – Sunday, 7 July 2024
IF#	Location	Region	Country	Start coord.	Time (UTC)	Path length	Max. width
IFU	Gonokhovo area	Altai Krai	Russia	52.942°N 81.287°E	08:20	Unknown	Unknown
IFU	A tornado was observed.						

=== 10 July event ===
List of confirmed tornadoes – Wednesday, 10 July 2024
IF#	Location	Region	Country	Start coord.	Time (UTC)	Path length	Max. width
IF0.5	NE of Grenaa	Central Denmark	Denmark	56.443°N 10.959°E	04:30	Unknown	Unknown
IF0.5	Outdoor furniture and tents were tossed and two small car trailers were flipped before the tornado moved offshore.						

=== 11 July event ===
List of confirmed tornadoes – Thursday, 11 July 2024
IF#	Location	Region	Country	Start coord.	Time (UTC)	Path length	Max. width
IFU	Mammari area	Nicosia	Cyprus	35.167°N 33.200°E	10:15	Unknown	Unknown
IFU	A landspout occurred.						
IFU	Naprawa area	Lesser Poland	Poland	49.645°N 19.877°E	11:05	Unknown	Unknown
IFU	A tornado was observed.						

=== 12 July event ===
List of confirmed tornadoes – Friday, 12 July 2024
IF#	Location	Region	Country	Start coord.	Time (UTC)	Path length	Max. width
IF1.5	W of Sendenhorst	North Rhine-Westphalia	Germany	51.833°N 7.833°E	13:28	4.2 km (2.6 mi)	90 m (98 yd)
IF1.5	A tornado damaged roofs and trees. Scarring was noted in fields.						
IF1.5	Telgte	North Rhine-Westphalia	Germany	51.983°N 7.783°E	13:45	3.6 km (2.2 mi)	180 m (200 yd)
IF1.5	This tornado tracked through Telgte, causing considerable damage. Roofs were torn off buildings and containers were thrown in an industrial area. One person was injured.						
IF1.5	Herzebrock-Clarholz	North Rhine-Westphalia	Germany	51.883°N 8.250°E	13:50	8.8 km (5.5 mi)	100 m (110 yd)
IF1.5	A tornado damaged roofs and trees while leaving scarring in fields.						
IF1	Dissen	Lower Saxony	Germany	52.117°N 8.200°E	14:10	1 km (0.62 mi)	270 m (300 yd)
IF1	This tornado moved through Dissen, damaging trees and roofs in town.						

=== 13 July event ===
List of confirmed tornadoes – Saturday, 13 July 2024
IF#	Location	Region	Country	Start coord.	Time (UTC)	Path length	Max. width
IF2	NW of Žalpiai	Šiauliai	Lithuania	55.533°N 22.767°E	13:00	Unknown	Unknown
IF2	This strong, multi-vortex tornado tore sturdy roofs off of buildings and snapped masonry electrical poles.						
IF2	NE of Kelmė	Šiauliai	Lithuania	55.667°N 23.050°E	13:40	1.3 km (0.81 mi)	170 m (190 yd)
IF2	A significant tornado caused damage to roofs and trees. Some trees had major debranching done.						
IF2	E of Bazilionai	Šiauliai	Lithuania	55.767°N 23.267°E	14:00	Unknown	Unknown
IF2	This strong tornado did significant damage in the town of Vileikiai to buildings, vehicles, and trees.						
IF1.5	Olaine	Olaine	Latvia	56.785°N 23.938°E	17:15	Unknown	Unknown
IF1.5	A tornado struck Olaine, damaging greenhouses, buildings, vehicles and trees.						

=== 14 July event ===
List of confirmed tornadoes – Sunday, 14 July 2024
IF#	Location	Region	Country	Start coord.	Time (UTC)	Path length	Max. width
IF1	S of Gomel	Gomel	Belarus	52.108°N 30.989°E	15:15	Unknown	Unknown
IF1	A tornado struck Novaya Guta, damaging roofs.						
IF1	Doliće	Zlatibor	Serbia	43.091°N 20.018°E	16:30	Unknown	Unknown
IF1	A landspout damaged roofs within Doliće.						

=== 15 July event ===
List of confirmed tornadoes – Monday, 15 July 2024
IF#	Location	Region	Country	Start coord.	Time (UTC)	Path length	Max. width
IFU	Sainte-Adresse	Normandy	France	49.509°N 0.084°E	16:00	Unknown	Unknown
IFU	A waterspout made landfall but dissipated quickly, causing no damage.						

=== 19 July event ===
List of confirmed tornadoes – Friday, 19 July 2024
IF#	Location	Region	Country	Start coord.	Time (UTC)	Path length	Max. width
IF1	Luleå	Norrbotten	Sweden	65.583°N 22.150°E	12:25	Unknown	Unknown
IF1	This tornado uprooted multiple trees.						

=== 20 July event ===
List of confirmed tornadoes – Saturday, 20 July 2024
IF#	Location	Region	Country	Start coord.	Time (UTC)	Path length	Max. width
IFU	Siñgel area	Tatarstan	Russia	55.408°N 49.309°E	08:00	Unknown	Unknown
IFU	A landspout tornado was reported.						
IFU	N of Gdov	Pskov	Russia	58.814°N 27.779°E	11:30	Unknown	Unknown
IFU	A reported tornado damaged roofs.						

=== 21 July event ===
List of confirmed tornadoes – Sunday, 21 July 2024
IF#	Location	Region	Country	Start coord.	Time (UTC)	Path length	Max. width
IF1	Wünsdorf area	Brandenburg	Germany	52.171°N 13.473°E	17:13	0.7 km (0.43 mi)	60 m (66 yd)
IF1	Several trees were downed and some roofs were damaged.						

=== 23 July event ===
List of confirmed tornadoes – Tuesday, 23 July 2024
IF#	Location	Region	Country	Start coord.	Time (UTC)	Path length	Max. width
IFU	SW of Otterup	Southern Denmark	Denmark	55.495°N 10.345°E	06:30	Unknown	Unknown
IFU	A brief tornado was photographed.						
IFU	W of Sjørring	North Jutland	Denmark	56.945°N 8.501°E	11:40	Unknown	Unknown
IFU	This tornado was observed over fields.						
IF0	NW of Sochi	Krasnodar Krai	Russia	43.645°N 39.635°E	13:40	Unknown	Unknown
IF0	A waterspout over the Black Sea made landfall in the Dagomys district of Sochi.						

=== 24 July event ===
List of confirmed tornadoes – Wednesday, 24 July 2024
IF#	Location	Region	Country	Start coord.	Time (UTC)	Path length	Max. width
IFU	NW of Mjölby	Östergötland	Sweden	58.336°N 15.089°E	09:00	Unknown	Unknown
IFU	A landspout was observed.						
IFU	Visibaba area	Zlatibor	Serbia	43.834°N 20.013°E	11:20	Unknown	Unknown
IFU	A tornado was observed.						
IFU	WSW of Yeysk	Krasnodar Krai	Russia	46.867°N 38.167°E	17:10	Unknown	Unknown
IFU	A tornado was observed over fields.						
IFU	SW of Yeysk	Krasnodar Krai	Russia	46.677°N 38.240°E	17:20	Unknown	Unknown
IFU	A tornado tracked through fields.						

=== 25 July event ===
List of confirmed tornadoes – Thursday, 25 July 2024
IF#	Location	Region	Country	Start coord.	Time (UTC)	Path length	Max. width
IFU	S of Chornomorske	Crimea	Ukraine	45.460°N 32.730°E	09:50	Unknown	Unknown
IFU	A tornado occurred. No damage was noted.						
IF1	SE of Chornomorske	Crimea	Ukraine	45.462°N 32.826°E	10:00	Unknown	Unknown
IF1	This tornado damaged multiple homes.						

== August ==
IFU	IF0	IF0.5	IF1	IF1.5	IF2	IF2.5	IF3	IF4	IF5	Total
9	1	11	12	3	0	0	0	0	0	36

=== 2 August event ===
List of confirmed tornadoes – Friday, 2 August 2024
IF#	Location	Region	Country	Start coord.	Time (UTC)	Path length	Max. width
IF1	SW of Molyobka	Perm	Russia	57.179°N 57.788°E	03:50	Unknown	Unknown
IF1	This tornado damaged several trees.						
IF0.5	E of El Toro	Valencia	Spain	39.978°N 0.728°W	14:50	Unknown	Unknown
IF0.5	A tornado damaged trees in farmland.						

=== 3 August event ===
List of confirmed tornadoes – Saturday, 3 August 2024
IF#	Location	Region	Country	Start coord.	Time (UTC)	Path length	Max. width
IFU	Agryz area	Tatarstan	Russia	56.519°N 52.996°E	07:50	Unknown	Unknown
IFU	A tornado was photographed.						

=== 4 August event ===
List of confirmed tornadoes – Sunday, 4 August 2024
IF#	Location	Region	Country	Start coord.	Time (UTC)	Path length	Max. width
IF1	Ummanz	Mecklenburg-Vorpommern	Germany	54.433°N 13.177°E	11:55	3.4 km (2.1 mi)	80 m (87 yd)
IF1	This tornado damaged trees, homes, power poles and vehicles.						
IFU	Koszalin	West Pomeranian	Poland	54.200°N 16.236°E	17:35	Unknown	Unknown
IFU	A brief tornado was observed.						

=== 8 August event ===
List of confirmed tornadoes – Thursday, 8 August 2024
IF#	Location	Region	Country	Start coord.	Time (UTC)	Path length	Max. width
IF0	Borkum (1st tornado)	Lower Saxony	Germany	53.589°N 6.658°E	07:30	0.7 km (0.43 mi)	5 m (5.5 yd)
IF0	A waterspout made landfall and tossed beach chairs.						
IF0.5	Borkum (2nd tornado)	Lower Saxony	Germany	53.587°N 6.658°E	07:30	0.7 km (0.43 mi)	5 m (5.5 yd)
IF0.5	Beach chairs and tables were tossed and thrown by a waterspout that made landfall.						
IF0.5	Wyk auf Föhr (1st tornado)	Schleswig-Holstein	Germany	54.681°N 8.538°E	08:45	Unknown	Unknown
IF0.5	A waterspout overturned and shifted a large beach chair.						
IF0.5	Wyk auf Föhr (2nd tornado)	Schleswig-Holstein	Germany	54.679°N 8.547°E	08:45	Unknown	Unknown
IF0.5	Beach furniture were moved and tossed.						
IFU	E of Tula	Tula	Russia	54.234°N 37.833°E	15:20	Unknown	Unknown
IFU	A tornado was observed.						

=== 10 August event ===
List of confirmed tornadoes – Saturday, 10 August 2024
IF#	Location	Region	Country	Start coord.	Time (UTC)	Path length	Max. width
IF0.5	Tosno	Leningrad	Russia	59.540°N 30.878°E	09:00	Unknown	Unknown
IF0.5	Trees were downed and a few roofs were damaged in Tosno.						

=== 11 August event ===
List of confirmed tornadoes – Sunday, 11 August 2024
IF#	Location	Region	Country	Start coord.	Time (UTC)	Path length	Max. width
IF1	Bolshaya Murta area	Krasnoyarsk	Russia	56.901°N 93.165°E	00:30	Unknown	Unknown
IF1	A tornado was observed. Tree damage occurred.						
IF1	SW of Bolshaya Murta	Krasnoyarsk	Russia	56.770°N 92.599°E	00:40	4 km (2.5 mi)	220 m (240 yd)
IF1	A tornado scar was noted on Sentinel-2 satellite imagery.						
IF1.5	Porvoo	Uusimaa	Finland	60.223°N 26.026°E	10:20	Unknown	Unknown
IF1.5	A waterspout made landfall and tossed a two ton boat onto a dock.						
IF1	Sosnovy Bor	Leningrad	Russia	59.869°N 29.054°E	10:40	Unknown	Unknown
IF1	A waterspout moved ashore, damaging greenhouses.						

=== 13 August event ===
List of confirmed tornadoes – Tuesday, 13 August 2024
IF#	Location	Region	Country	Start coord.	Time (UTC)	Path length	Max. width
IFU	NE of Aïn Djasser	Batna	Algeria	35.899°N 6.042°E	18:30	Unknown	Unknown
IFU	A landspout was observed.						

=== 14 August event ===
List of confirmed tornadoes – Wednesday, 14 August 2024
IF#	Location	Region	Country	Start coord.	Time (UTC)	Path length	Max. width
IFU	SE of Gostilitsy	Leningrad	Russia	59.738°N 29.684°E	09:00	Unknown	Unknown
IFU	A brief tornado was observed.						

=== 15 August event ===
List of confirmed tornadoes – Thursday, 15 August 2024
IF#	Location	Region	Country	Start coord.	Time (UTC)	Path length	Max. width
IF0.5	Ospedaletti	Liguria	Italy	43.800°N 7.712°E	06:15	Unknown	Unknown
IF0.5	A waterspout made landfall, overturning small boats and tossing a piece of sheet metal.						

=== 18 August event ===
List of confirmed tornadoes – Sunday, 18 August 2024
IF#	Location	Region	Country	Start coord.	Time (UTC)	Path length	Max. width
IF1	Powiercie-Kolonia area	Greater Poland	Poland	52.183°N 18.700°E	14:50	Unknown	Unknown
IF1	At least eight roofs were damaged by a tornado.						

=== 19 August event ===
List of confirmed tornadoes – Monday, 19 August 2024
IF#	Location	Region	Country	Start coord.	Time (UTC)	Path length	Max. width
IF1	NW of Trinità d'Agultu e Vignola	Sardinia	Italy	41.010°N 8.885°E	07:15	Unknown	Unknown
IF1	Light objects were lofted, street signs were downed and a house under construction had its roof damage.						
IF0.5	SW of Trinità d'Agultu e Vignola	Sardinia	Italy	40.953°N 8.866°E	07:15	Unknown	Unknown
IF0.5	This waterspout made landfall and ripped sheet metal off of a car wash. Light objects were lofted and damaged was reported at a beach facility.						
IF0.5	Policastro Bussentino	Campania	Italy	40.070°N 15.522°E	17:45	Unknown	Unknown
IF0.5	A waterspout moved ashore, damaging a few boats at a beach facility.						

=== 20 August event ===
List of confirmed tornadoes – Tuesday, 20 August 2024
IF#	Location	Region	Country	Start coord.	Time (UTC)	Path length	Max. width
IF0.5	S of Policoro	Basilicata	Italy	40.125°N 16.654°E	12:30	Unknown	Unknown
IF0.5	This waterspout made landfall on a beach, tossing lawn chairs, umbrellas and other light objects. A tree branch was also snapped off a tree.						

=== 21 August event ===
List of confirmed tornadoes – Wednesday, 21 August 2024
IF#	Location	Region	Country	Start coord.	Time (UTC)	Path length	Max. width
IFU	N of Nizhny Tagil	Sverdlovsk	Russia	58.011°N 59.888°E	15:00	Unknown	Unknown
IFU	A tornado was observed and recorded.						

=== 22 August event ===
List of confirmed tornadoes – Thursday, 22 August 2024
IF#	Location	Region	Country	Start coord.	Time (UTC)	Path length	Max. width
IF1	E of Snezhinsk	Chelyabinsk	Russia	56.113°N 61.516°E	13:10	Unknown	Unknown
IF1	A tornado damaged roofs in the town of Ognëvskoye.						

=== 24 August event ===
List of confirmed tornadoes – Saturday, 24 August 2024
IF#	Location	Region	Country	Start coord.	Time (UTC)	Path length	Max. width
IF1	Hagavik	Vestland	Norway	60.179°N 5.414°E	06:52	0.35 km (0.22 mi)	Unknown
IF1	This tornado passed through a football pitch, damaging sports facilities, roofs, a well-built greenhouse and trees.						
IF1	SE of Rødding	Southern Denmark	Denmark	55.320°N 9.144°E	19:30	Unknown	150 m (160 yd)
IF1	Several trees were downed, some of which fell onto roofs or cars, damaging them.						
IF1.5	NNW of Tørring	Central Denmark	Denmark	55.907°N 9.439°E	19:45	6.57 km (4.08 mi)	580 m (630 yd)
IF1.5	This QLCS tornado caused widespread damage, downing between one hundred to one hundred fifty trees and partially tearing roofs from barns and a house. Several vehicles and greenhouses were damaged, while hardwood trees at a farm were severely affected, with some trunks snapped, uprooted, or heavily debranched.						
IF1.5	Attendorn	North Rhine-Westphalia	Germany	51.126°N 7.895°E	19:50	4.1 km (2.5 mi)	420 m (460 yd)
IF1.5	A tornado moved through Attendorn, damaging cars, roofs and trees.						

=== 25 August event ===
List of confirmed tornadoes – Sunday, 25 August 2024
IF#	Location	Region	Country	Start coord.	Time (UTC)	Path length	Max. width
IF1	Latakia	Latakia	Syria	35.533°N 35.772°E	04:45	Unknown	Unknown
IF1	A waterspout made landfall at a fish market, damaging several roofs.						

=== 28 August event ===
List of confirmed tornadoes – Wednesday, 28 August 2024
IF#	Location	Region	Country	Start coord.	Time (UTC)	Path length	Max. width
IFU	Küçükçekmece	Istanbul	Turkey	41.008°N 28.756°E	08:05	Unknown	Unknown
IFU	A waterspout briefly made landfall before quickly dissipating.						
IFU	SW of Manfredonia	Apulia	Italy	41.532°N 15.832°E	11:40	Unknown	Unknown
IFU	A landspout caused no damage.						
IF0.5	Nytva	Perm	Russia	57.939°N 55.337°E	12:20	Unknown	Unknown
IF0.5	Several trees were damaged.						
IFU	SE of Cheria	Tébessa	Algeria	35.233°N 7.829°E	14:30	Unknown	Unknown
IFU	A landspout was recorded.						

=== 30 August event ===
List of confirmed tornadoes – Friday, 30 August 2024
IF#	Location	Region	Country	Start coord.	Time (UTC)	Path length	Max. width
IF1	SE of Frontove	Crimea	Ukraine	44.661°N 33.757°E	10:50	Unknown	Unknown
IF1	This tornado struck Kholmivka, damaging approximately the roofs of forty buildings in town.						
IF0.5	Riofrío area	Castile and León	Spain	40.540°N 4.781°W	16:15	Unknown	Unknown
IF0.5	A rope tornado damaged several trees.						

== September ==
IFU	IF0	IF0.5	IF1	IF1.5	IF2	IF2.5	IF3	IF4	IF5	Total
24	4	22	14	9	1	1	1	0	0	76

=== 1 September event ===
List of confirmed tornadoes – Sunday, 1 September 2024
IF#	Location	Region	Country	Start coord.	Time (UTC)	Path length	Max. width
IF1	SSE of Çekiçler	Aksaray	Turkey	38.566°N 34.119°E	15:00	Unknown	Unknown
IF1	Multiple greenhouses were damaged along with vegetable crops.						

=== 2 September event ===
List of confirmed tornadoes – Monday, 2 September 2024
IF#	Location	Region	Country	Start coord.	Time (UTC)	Path length	Max. width
IFU	E of Benifallim	Valencia	Spain	38.663°N 0.380°W	12:40	Unknown	Unknown
IFU	A landspout tornado was observed.						
IFU	SW of Ibn Ziad	Mila	Algeria	36.321°N 6.406°E	13:10	Unknown	Unknown
IFU	A landspout tornado was photographed and recorded.						
IF0.5	Nakkila	Satakunta	Finland	61.367°N 22.000°E	16:45	Unknown	Unknown
IF0.5	A small roof cover was lifted and tossed.						
IF0.5	Pori	Satakunta	Finland	61.483°N 21.783°E	17:20	Unknown	Unknown
IF0.5	This tornado moved through Uusikoivisto in Pori, where it partially collapsed a wall at a horse racing track. Several trees were either uprooted or snapped along with large tree branches being downed.						

=== 3 September event ===
List of confirmed tornadoes – Tuesday, 3 September 2024
IF#	Location	Region	Country	Start coord.	Time (UTC)	Path length	Max. width
IF1	Saint-Antoine	Bourgogne-Franche-Comté	France	47.683°N 6.333°E	10:53	0.8 km (0.50 mi)	Unknown
IF1	Several roofs were damaged, including one of which was partially torn off. A wooden shed also collapsed.						
IFU	NE of Lavello	Basilicata	Italy	41.099°N 15.858°E	11:25	Unknown	Unknown
IFU	A landspout caused no damage.						
IFU	SW of Stornarella	Apulia	Italy	41.247°N 15.703°E	11:55	Unknown	Unknown
IFU	This landspout was photographed moving through fields.						
IFU	NE of Stornarella	Apulia	Italy	41.269°N 15.746°E	12:00	Unknown	Unknown
IFU	Several photos were taken of a landspout. No damage occurred.						
IFU	SE of Torremaggiore (1st tornado)	Apulia	Italy	41.657°N 15.324°E	12:10	Unknown	Unknown
IFU	A landspout remained in open fields.						
IFU	SE of Torremaggiore (2nd tornado)	Apulia	Italy	41.658°N 15.317°E	12:10	Unknown	Unknown
IFU	This landspout did no damage.						

=== 4 September event ===
List of confirmed tornadoes – Wednesday, 4 September 2024
IF#	Location	Region	Country	Start coord.	Time (UTC)	Path length	Max. width
IF0.5	WSW of Lenine	Crimea	Ukraine	45.243°N 35.566°E	11:15	Unknown	Unknown
IF0.5	Roofs and trees were damaged in the village of Semysotka.						
IFU	N of Novoselivske	Crimea	Ukraine	45.607°N 33.613°E	12:20	Unknown	Unknown
IFU	A landspout was observed.						
IFU	N of Ozieri	Sardinia	Italy	40.621°N 9.001°E	14:20	Unknown	Unknown
IFU	A tornado caused no damage.						
IFU	Rosmalen area	North Brabant	Netherlands	51.717°N 5.365°E	16:45	Unknown	Unknown
IFU	A funnel cloud briefly made ground contact, causing no damage.						

=== 5 September event ===
List of confirmed tornadoes – Thursday, 5 September 2024
IF#	Location	Region	Country	Start coord.	Time (UTC)	Path length	Max. width
IF0.5	Marina di Grosseto	Tuscany	Italy	42.724°N 10.973°E	11:14	Unknown	Unknown
IF0.5	Lawn chairs and light objects were lofted.						
IF0	Bellaria – Igea Marina (1st tornado)	Emilia-Romagna	Italy	44.137°N 12.481°E	14:27	Unknown	Unknown
IF0	A tornado developed on a beach, tossing light objects before moving out to sea.						
IF0	Bellaria – Igea Marina (2nd tornado)	Emilia-Romagna	Italy	44.144°N 12.472°E	14:28	Unknown	Unknown
IF0	This tornado tossed a small boat 10 m (11 yd), moved or lofted light objects and flipped lawn chairs before moving offshore.						
IF0.5	NW of Rimini	Emilia-Romagna	Italy	44.104°N 12.518°E	14:30	Unknown	Unknown
IF0.5	Lawn chairs, umbrellas and other light objects were tossed around by a tornado that became a waterspout as it moved off to sea.						

=== 6 September event ===
List of confirmed tornadoes – Friday, 6 September 2024
IF#	Location	Region	Country	Start coord.	Time (UTC)	Path length	Max. width
IF0.5	NE of Melendugno	Apulia	Italy	40.304°N 18.400°E	10:53	Unknown	Unknown
IF0.5	This tornado damaged boats, lofting a small one several meters. Light objects were also tossed around.						
IF0.5	Copertino	Apulia	Italy	40.275°N 18.048°E	12:14	Unknown	Unknown
IF0.5	A brief tornado snapped tree branches, damaged a supermarket and tossed around objects.						

=== 7 September event ===
List of confirmed tornadoes – Saturday, 7 September 2024
IF#	Location	Region	Country	Start coord.	Time (UTC)	Path length	Max. width
IF0.5	Flers	Normandy	France	48.750°N 0.567°W	16:00	Unknown	Unknown
IF0.5	Several trees were snapped or uprooted by a tornado.						
IF1	Quarante	Occitania	France	43.350°N 2.967°E	16:30	Unknown	Unknown
IF1	This tornado damaged a few roofs and broke a car window.						

=== 8 September event ===
List of confirmed tornadoes – Sunday, 8 September 2024
IF#	Location	Region	Country	Start coord.	Time (UTC)	Path length	Max. width
IF0.5	Salzano	Veneto	Italy	45.526°N 12.107°E	16:25	1.7 km (1.1 mi)	140 m (150 yd)
IF0.5	A tornado tore off part of a roof, tossed light objects and downed trees.						
IF0.5	NW of Montalto di Castro	Lazio	Italy	42.383°N 11.513°E	20:05	0.9 km (0.56 mi)	70 m (77 yd)
IF0.5	Numerous greenhouses were damaged. Debris from the greenhouses also damaged powerlines nearby.						

=== 9 September event ===
List of confirmed tornadoes – Monday, 9 September 2024
IF#	Location	Region	Country	Start coord.	Time (UTC)	Path length	Max. width
IF0.5	S of Pontecagnano Faiano	Campania	Italy	40.586°N 14.88°E	04:55	Unknown	25 m (27 yd)
IF0.5	A beaching facility was damaged and a bar-shed was destroyed.						
IFU	S of Torricella	Apulia	Italy	40.307°N 17.499°E	08:35	Unknown	Unknown
IFU	A tornado caused no damage.						

=== 11 September event ===
List of confirmed tornadoes – Wednesday, 11 September 2024
IF#	Location	Region	Country	Start coord.	Time (UTC)	Path length	Max. width
IF0.5	Chios	North Aegean	Greece	38.372°N 26.141°E	00:00	Unknown	Unknown
IF0.5	A tornado destroyed metal fencing.						
IFU	Varazze	Liguria	Italy	44.366°N 8.606°E	08:15	Unknown	Unknown
IFU	A waterspout made landfall and no damage occurred.						

=== 12 September event ===
List of confirmed tornadoes – Thursday, 12 September 2024
IF#	Location	Region	Country	Start coord.	Time (UTC)	Path length	Max. width
IFU	W of Orebić	Dubrovnik-Neretva	Croatia	42.975°N 17.15°E	13:22–13:32	Unknown	Unknown
IFU	A waterspout briefly made landfall, causing no damage.						
IF0.5	N of Palinuro	Campania	Italy	40.048°N 15.284°E	19:28	Unknown	Unknown
IF0.5	Lawn chairs were tossed around.						

=== 13 September event ===
List of confirmed tornadoes – Friday, 13 September 2024
IF#	Location	Region	Country	Start coord.	Time (UTC)	Path length	Max. width
IF0.5	NE of Apricena	Apulia	Italy	41.804°N 15.482°E	12:21–12:26	0.9 km (0.56 mi)	50 m (55 yd)
IF0.5	This landspout made a chimney collapse, ripped off sheet metal roofing, lofted light objects and snapped tree branches.						

=== 14 September event ===
List of confirmed tornadoes – Saturday, 14 September 2024
IF#	Location	Region	Country	Start coord.	Time (UTC)	Path length	Max. width
IF2	Urbanów area to Jeziorno to Wierzchowiny to Boża Wola area	Masovian	Poland	51.576°N 21.193°E	13:12	Unknown	Unknown
IF2	This strong tornado struck Jeziorno and Wierzchowiny. Four buildings in Jeizorno were damaged and sixteen were damaged in Wierzchowiny. Two residential buildings had their roofs completely torn off.						
IF1.5	Chinów to Nowa Wieś to Holendry Kuźmińskie	Masovian	Poland	51.649°N 21.482°E	14:05	10 km (6.2 mi)	Unknown
IF1.5	A tornado struck several villages, damaging six roofs in Nowa Wieś, three roofs in Holendry Kuźmińskie, and causing numerous trees to fall in Chinów.						
IF1.5	Brudzewice-Kolonia to Brudzewice	Łódź	Poland	51.550°N 20.433°E	14:35	Unknown	Unknown
IF1.5	This tornado caused damage to several roofs, trees and powerlines.						
IF1	Chrosna to Sufczyn	Masovian	Poland	52.045°N 21.524°E	14:55	Unknown	Unknown
IF1	In Chrosna, multiple roofs were damaged, several trees were downed, and a gable wall of an outbuilding was partially destroyed. As the tornado then struck Sufczyn, it broke large tree branches before dissipating.						
IF1.5	Grobice	Masovian	Poland	51.922°N 21.118°E	15:55	Unknown	Unknown
IF1.5	Several roofs were damaged within Grobice.						
IF1	Krobów to Kociszew	Masovian	Poland	51.852°N 20.910°E	16:20	Unknown	Unknown
IF1	This tornado damaged multiple roofs in Krobów and Kociszew.						
IFU	N of Krakovets	Lviv	Ukraine	49.970°N 23.167°E	16:35	Unknown	Unknown
IFU	A tornado was observed.						

=== 15 September event ===
List of confirmed tornadoes – Sunday, 15 September 2024
IF#	Location	Region	Country	Start coord.	Time (UTC)	Path length	Max. width
IFU	Biadki area	Greater Poland	Poland	51.683°N 17.550°E	16:50	Unknown	Unknown
IFU	A tornado was recorded doing no damage.						
IF1	Karmin	Greater Poland	Poland	51.837°N 17.681°E	17:05	Unknown	Unknown
IF1	This tornado damaged several trees and tombstones in and around a cemetery.						

=== 16 September event ===
List of confirmed tornadoes – Monday, 16 September 2024
IF#	Location	Region	Country	Start coord.	Time (UTC)	Path length	Max. width
IF0	Casaluce	Campania	Italy	41.023°N 14.194°E	13:43	Unknown	Unknown
IF0	Greenhouse covers were damaged.						

=== 17 September event ===
List of confirmed tornadoes – Tuesday, 17 September 2024
IF#	Location	Region	Country	Start coord.	Time (UTC)	Path length	Max. width
IFU	S of Montecorice	Campania	Italy	40.220°N 14.985°E	15:40	Unknown	Unknown
IFU	A waterspout made landfall and did no damage.						
IF0.5	S of Policoro	Basilicata	Italy	40.170°N 16.678°E	18:30	Unknown	Unknown
IF0.5	This tornado snapped tree branches and tossed them into powerlines. Greenhouses were also bent and had partial removal of their sheets.						

=== 18 September event ===
List of confirmed tornadoes – Wednesday, 18 September 2024
IF#	Location	Region	Country	Start coord.	Time (UTC)	Path length	Max. width
IFU	N of Meknassy	Sidi Bouzid	Tunisia	34.644°N 9.608°E	14:40	Unknown	Unknown
IFU	A tornado was observed.						
IF0.5	SE of Bir Ali Ben Khélifa	Sfax	Tunisia	34.664°N 10.163°E	15:20	Unknown	Unknown
IF0.5	A tornado damaged trees.						

=== 19 September event ===
List of confirmed tornadoes – Thursday, 19 September 2024
IF#	Location	Region	Country	Start coord.	Time (UTC)	Path length	Max. width
IF0.5	NNW of San Giuseppe Jato	Sicily	Italy	37.982°N 13.170°E	12:00	0.2 km (0.12 mi)	30 m (33 yd)
IF0.5	A tornado downed several trees.						

=== 20 September event ===
List of confirmed tornadoes – Friday, 20 September 2024
IF#	Location	Region	Country	Start coord.	Time (UTC)	Path length	Max. width
IFU	Palmi	Calabria	Italy	38.354°N 15.834°E	06:05	Unknown	Unknown
IFU	A waterspout made landfall but caused no damage.						
IF1.5	Aldershot	Hampshire	United Kingdom	51.250°N 0.767°W	12:03	2 km (1.2 mi)	Unknown
IF1.5	This tornado caused damage throughout Aldershot, snapping and uprooting trees and destroying several roofs. One building lost its plywood roof.						

=== 21 September event ===
List of confirmed tornadoes – Saturday, 21 September 2024
IF#	Location	Region	Country	Start coord.	Time (UTC)	Path length	Max. width
IF0.5	NE of San Pietro Vernotico	Apulia	Italy	40.540°N 18.071°E	09:00	Unknown	Unknown
IF0.5	Light objects and gazebos were tossed.						

=== 22 September event ===
List of confirmed tornadoes – Sunday, 22 September 2024
IF#	Location	Region	Country	Start coord.	Time (UTC)	Path length	Max. width
IF1.5	Komi Kebir	Famagusta	Cyprus	35.407°N 33.994°E	06:50	Unknown	Unknown
IF1.5	This tornado damaged multiple olive trees and overturned a caravan, injuring or killing several birds.						
IF1	Luton	Bedfordshire	United Kingdom	51.880°N 0.442°W	16:10	Unknown	Unknown
IF1	Several roofs were damaged on buildings in Luton.						

=== 23 September event ===
List of confirmed tornadoes – Monday, 23 September 2024
IF#	Location	Region	Country	Start coord.	Time (UTC)	Path length	Max. width
IF1.5	Sainte-Gemme area	Centre-Val de Loire	France	46.850°N 1.333°E	17:30	Unknown	Unknown
IF1.5	This tornado caused severe damage along its path, lifting and carrying away a mobile home, tearing roofs off several buildings, and destroying a garage. Seven additional houses were damaged, heavy objects were thrown several hundred meters, and multiple fir trees were uprooted.						

=== 24 September event ===
List of confirmed tornadoes – Tuesday, 24 September 2024
IF#	Location	Region	Country	Start coord.	Time (UTC)	Path length	Max. width
IFU	Mortagne-sur-Gironde	Nouvelle-Aquitaine	France	45.483°N 0.783°W	09:50	Unknown	Unknown
IFU	A waterspout made landfall, damaging sunflower fields.						
IFU	NW of Cetraro	Calabria	Italy	39.539°N 15.897°E	14:00	Unknown	Unknown
IFU	A tornado caused no damage.						
IF0.5	W of Meduna di Livenza	Veneto	Italy	45.804°N 12.587°E	15:10	Unknown	Unknown
IF0.5	This tornado caused damage to a roof, a canopy and a large plastic sheet.						
IF0.5	E of Pravisdomini	Friuli-Venezia Giulia	Italy	45.820°N 12.704°E	15:35	1.6 km (0.99 mi)	Unknown
IF0.5	A tornado did light damage to a plastic sheet and a roof.						

=== 25 September event ===
List of confirmed tornadoes – Wednesday, 25 September 2024
IF#	Location	Region	Country	Start coord.	Time (UTC)	Path length	Max. width
IFU	SW of Khobi	Samegrelo-Zemo Svaneti	Georgia	42.296°N 41.876°E	09:45	3.7 km (2.3 mi)	250 m (270 yd)
IFU	A tornado was observed in the Khobistskhali River valley.						
IF1	S of Nargis	Centre-Val de Loire	France	48.100°N 2.750°E	13:05	Unknown	Unknown
IF1	Two kennels were swept away in a stream and trees were damaged.						
IFU	NW of Vernazza	Liguria	Italy	44.141°N 9.671°E	14:56–15:05	Unknown	Unknown
IFU	This waterspout moved ashore and caused no damage.						
IF1	NE of Alpen	North Rhine-Westphalia	Germany	51.600°N 6.550°E	15:30	13 km (8.1 mi)	Unknown
IF1	This tornado caused damage to roofs, trees and cars.						
IF1.5	S of Svullrya	Innlandet	Norway	60.390°N 12.423°E	15:35	3.14 km (1.95 mi)	250 m (270 yd)
IF1.5	A tornado flattened hundreds of trees in forested land.						
IF0.5	E of Velen	North Rhine-Westphalia	Germany	51.900°N 7.033°E	16:20	1.3 km (0.81 mi)	20 m (22 yd)
IF0.5	A tornado uprooted birch trees and did ground scouring in fields.						
IFU	N of Arnhem	Gelderland	Netherlands	52.050°N 5.937°E	17:00	Unknown	Unknown
IFU	A tornado was filmed. No known damage occurred.						
IF1.5	Münster to Telgte	North Rhine-Westphalia	Germany	51.983°N 7.700°E	17:12	8.2 km (5.1 mi)	320 m (350 yd)
IF1.5	A tornado caused considerable damage to forests.						

=== 26 September event ===
List of confirmed tornadoes – Thursday, 26 September 2024
IF#	Location	Region	Country	Start coord.	Time (UTC)	Path length	Max. width
IFU	Santa Cesarea Terme (1st tornado)	Apulia	Italy	40.035°N 18.460°E	04:08–04:26	Unknown	Unknown
IFU	A long-lived waterspout moved ashore and quickly dissipated.						
IFU	Santa Cesarea Terme (2nd tornado)	Apulia	Italy	40.038°N 18.465°E	05:15–05:26	Unknown	Unknown
IFU	A waterspout made landfall and caused no known damage.						
IF1	W of Saint-Jean-de-Losne	Bourgogne-Franche-Comté	France	47.100°N 5.250°E	12:20	1.6 km (0.99 mi)	20 m (22 yd)
IF1	This tornado was filmed tearing roof tiles from multiple buildings and completely removing six roofs, one of which lost about fifty tiles. Several garden shelters were also damaged.						
IF1.5	Hook	Hampshire	United Kingdom	51.281°N 0.957°W	14:00	0.7 km (0.43 mi)	160 m (170 yd)
IF1.5	A brief tornado snapped a large oak tree which fell onto a grazing house causing minor damage to its gutters and conservatory.						
IF1	Hartley Wintney	Hampshire	United Kingdom	51.308°N 0.897°W	14:05	3.4 km (2.1 mi)	140 m (150 yd)
IF1	Trees were damaged.						
IF0.5	Écaussinnes	Hainaut	Belgium	50.567°N 4.183°E	14:55	5 km (3.1 mi)	150 m (160 yd)
IF0.5	This tornado tracked through farm land, damaging the roofs of some buildings.						
IF2.5	Beauvechain	Walloon Brabant, Flemish Brabant	Belgium	50.780°N 4.792°E	16:00	15.2 km (9.4 mi)	250 m (270 yd)
IF2.5	This strong tornado struck Beauvechain, damaging approximately twenty houses. One farm building was completely destroyed, injuring several horses.						
IF1	Linter	Flemish Brabant	Belgium	50.867°N 5.100°E	16:25	8 km (5.0 mi)	50 m (55 yd)
IF1	Several roofs were torn off in Budingen. Corn fields were completely flattened and trees were snapped or uprooted. Heavy wooden bins were moved and metal sheets were blown out of a shed.						

=== 27 September event ===
List of confirmed tornadoes – Friday, 27 September 2024
IF#	Location	Region	Country	Start coord.	Time (UTC)	Path length	Max. width
IF1	Agris area	Nouvelle-Aquitaine	France	45.783°N 0.333°E	12:13	2.9 km (1.8 mi)	80 m (87 yd)
IF1	A tornado uprooted trees, raised roof tiles, and damaged fences.						

=== 28 September event ===
List of confirmed tornadoes – Saturday, 28 September 2024
IF#	Location	Region	Country	Start coord.	Time (UTC)	Path length	Max. width
IF3	ENE of Reshetnikovo	Moscow	Russia	56.469°N 36.677°E	13:35	13.5 km (8.4 mi)	470 m (510 yd)
IF3	1 death – An intense tornado struck Berezino, killing one person when a tree snapped and fell. Numerous trees were snapped, uprooted, or heavily debranched, and several homes sustained severe roof and structural damage. A transmission tower collapsed, and a two-story wooden summer house was ripped from its foundation and flipped about 20 m (22 yd). Another summer house was destroyed, and several trees showed partial debarking from sand or debris blasts.						
IF1	W of 2nd Smirnovka	Moscow	Russia	56.223°N 36.791°E	13:50	Unknown	Unknown
IF1	Several roofs were damaged.						

=== 30 September event ===
List of confirmed tornadoes – Monday, 30 September 2024
IF#	Location	Region	Country	Start coord.	Time (UTC)	Path length	Max. width
IF0	Çanakçı	Antalya	Turkey	36.978°N 31.016°E	09:00	Unknown	Unknown
IF0	Greenhouses were damaged.						

== October ==
IFU	IF0	IF0.5	IF1	IF1.5	IF2	IF2.5	IF3	IF4	IF5	Total
6	0	2	11	6	1	0	0	0	0	26

=== 1 October event ===
List of confirmed tornadoes – Tuesday, 1 October 2024
IF#	Location	Region	Country	Start coord.	Time (UTC)	Path length	Max. width
IF0.5	E of Arab al-Mulk	Tartus	Syria	35.265°N 35.947°E	23:30	Unknown	Unknown
IF0.5	This waterspout made landfall and inflicted damage to several greenhouses.						

=== 3 October event ===
List of confirmed tornadoes – Thursday, 3 October 2024
IF#	Location	Region	Country	Start coord.	Time (UTC)	Path length	Max. width
IF0.5	E of Santa Severa	Lazio	Italy	42.019°N 11.975°E	09:25	3.7 km (2.3 mi)	120 m (130 yd)
IF0.5	A waterspout moved ashore, lofting and moving roof tiles and light objects. One plastic sheet was ripped off and tossed onto a railway, damaging the sheet and a train that was passing by.						
IF1.5	Zastražišće	Split-Dalmatia	Croatia	43.145°N 16.836°E	20:55–20:56	Unknown	Unknown
IF1.5	This tornado caused significant localized damage around a single property, destroying an assembly building and downing twelve power poles. It also damaged ten olive trees and three fig trees.						

=== 5 October event ===
List of confirmed tornadoes – Saturday, 5 October 2024
IF#	Location	Region	Country	Start coord.	Time (UTC)	Path length	Max. width
IF1.5	Agios Andreas to Skourochori	Western Greece	Greece	37.665°N 21.311°E	03:15	Unknown	Unknown
IF1.5	A tornado damaged power poles, roofs of buildings and several dozen trees.						

=== 7 October event ===
List of confirmed tornadoes – Monday, 7 October 2024
IF#	Location	Region	Country	Start coord.	Time (UTC)	Path length	Max. width
IFU	NNW of Cee	Galicia	Spain	43.006°N 9.259°W	14:15	Unknown	Unknown
IFU	A waterspout made landfall causing no known damage.						
IF1	S of Vimianzo	Galicia	Spain	43.096°N 9.026°W	14:55	5 km (3.1 mi)	Unknown
IF1	This tornado damaged several roofs, snapped trees and smally statue was tossed.						
IF1	Pont-Aven	Brittany	France	47.850°N 3.750°W	15:15	4.4 km (2.7 mi)	100 m (110 yd)
IF1	A tornado bent an agricultural shed, downed trees and snapped tree branches.						

=== 8 October event ===
List of confirmed tornadoes – Tuesday, 8 October 2024
IF#	Location	Region	Country	Start coord.	Time (UTC)	Path length	Max. width
IF1	Coventry	West Midlands	United Kingdom	52.380°N 1.532°W	17:30	Unknown	Unknown
IF1	A tornado caused localized damage, downing a large tree across several gardens and damaging roofs, ridge tiles, fences, and brickwork on nearby homes. Residents reported a loud roaring sound and debris such as bins and garden furniture being thrown into roads.						
IF1	Saint-Manvieu-Norrey to Rots to Périers-sur-le-Dan	Normandy	France	49.217°N 0.467°W	17:35	14.7 km (9.1 mi)	150 m (160 yd)
IF1	This tornado, confirmed by radar, video, and eyewitness reports, caused significant damage along its path. Trees were uprooted or snapped, branches broken, and multiple roofs were damaged. Flying debris was captured on video, and around 600 m (660 yd) of roofing was torn from an industrial building. Two people were injured.						
IF1	Brive-la-Gaillarde	Nouvelle-Aquitaine	France	45.133°N 1.515°E	18:15	1.9 km (1.2 mi)	100 m (110 yd)
IF1	A narrow tornado uprooted or snapped trees and blew down panels and fences. Photographs of the scene showed convergent debris patterns.						
IF1	Hayling Island to Thorney Island	Hampshire, West Sussex	United Kingdom	50.816°N 0.910°W	19:36	Unknown	Unknown
IF1	This tornado caused damage to structures, tossed trampolines and snapped or uprooted multiple trees.						

=== 10 October event ===
List of confirmed tornadoes – Thursday, 10 October 2024
IF#	Location	Region	Country	Start coord.	Time (UTC)	Path length	Max. width
IF1	Cubry-lès-Faverney area	Bourgogne-Franche-Comté	France	47.817°N 6.133°E	16:20	Unknown	Unknown
IF1	This tornado damaged eight houses, three vehicles, and two garages.						

=== 13 October event ===
List of confirmed tornadoes – Sunday, 13 October 2024
IF#	Location	Region	Country	Start coord.	Time (UTC)	Path length	Max. width
IF1.5	NW of Timashevsk	Krasnodar	Russia	45.652°N 38.884°E	13:50	Unknown	Unknown
IF1.5	Several roofs and power lines were damaged. Trees were also uprooted or snapped.						

=== 17 October event ===
List of confirmed tornadoes – Thursday, 17 October 2024
IF#	Location	Region	Country	Start coord.	Time (UTC)	Path length	Max. width
IF1.5	N of Hasançavuş	Düzce	Turkey	41.072°N 31.013°E	08:15	Unknown	Unknown
IF1.5	Some small beach sheds were completely destroyed and roofs were damaged.						

=== 18 October event ===
List of confirmed tornadoes – Friday, 18 October 2024
IF#	Location	Region	Country	Start coord.	Time (UTC)	Path length	Max. width
IFU	NE of Jolanda di Savoia	Emilia-Romagna	Italy	44.911°N 12.028°E	14:15	Unknown	Unknown
IFU	A tornado was observed. No damage occurred.						

=== 19 October event ===
List of confirmed tornadoes – Saturday, 19 October 2024
IF#	Location	Region	Country	Start coord.	Time (UTC)	Path length	Max. width
IFU	SSE of Ispica	Sicily	Italy	36.720°N 14.928°E	05:45	Unknown	Unknown
IFU	Some light objects were lofted.						
IF1	Portopalo di Capo Passero	Sicily	Italy	36.683°N 15.129°E	06:30	4.4 km (2.7 mi)	500 m (550 yd)
IF1	A tornado began and ended over the sea, moving onshore where it caused minor but widespread damage. Several power poles and wall fences were downed, trees and branches were snapped, and light roof damage occurred. Greenhouses and a beach facility were also damaged, with light debris scattered along its path.						
IF1.5	Çayeli	Rize	Turkey	41.101°N 40.738°E	09:00	Unknown	Unknown
IF1.5	A waterspout made landfall causing significant damage to multiple roofs.						
IFU	S of Poti	Samegrelo-Zemo Svaneti	Georgia	42.059°N 41.727°E	23:36	3.7 km (2.3 mi)	250 m (270 yd)
IFU	This tornado damaged at least thirty roofs.						

=== 27 October event ===
List of confirmed tornadoes – Sunday, 27 October 2024
IF#	Location	Region	Country	Start coord.	Time (UTC)	Path length	Max. width
IF1	Frontignan	Occitania	France	43.450°N 3.750°E	03:35	2.8 km (1.7 mi)	50 m (55 yd)
IF1	A waterspout came ashore and caused notable damage in the area, tearing roofs from about forty houses and gutting one building. A boat was overturned, several traffic signs and billboards were knocked down, and a stadium also sustained damage.						
IFU	W of Valenza	Piedmont	Italy	45.027°N 8.590°E	15:15	Unknown	Unknown
IFU	A tornado caused no known damage.						

=== 29 October event ===
List of confirmed tornadoes – Tuesday, 29 October 2024
IF#	Location	Region	Country	Start coord.	Time (UTC)	Path length	Max. width
IF1	Benifaió	Valencia	Spain	39.279°N 0.427°W	13:30	2.2 km (1.4 mi)	Unknown
IF1	This tornado damaged roofs, vehicles and trees.						
IF2	Carlet to Alginet	Valencia	Spain	39.239°N 0.486°W	15:30	7 km (4.3 mi)	400 m (440 yd)
IF2	A strong tornado struck the industrial sector of Carlet, heavily damaging a large industrial building. The tornado significantly damaged a supermarket in Alginet and damaged roofs. Trucks were tossed and overturned on the A-7.						
IF1.5	W of Benifaió	Valencia	Spain	39.287°N 0.450°W	17:30	Unknown	Unknown
IF1.5	Industrial buildings had their roofs damaged.						

=== 31 October event ===
List of confirmed tornadoes – Thursday, 31 October 2024
IF#	Location	Region	Country	Start coord.	Time (UTC)	Path length	Max. width
IFU	E of Sallum	Matrouh	Egypt	31.507°N 25.306°E	13:55	Unknown	Unknown
IFU	A waterspout made landfall.						
IF1	Isla Cristina	Valencia	Spain	37.197°N 7.328°W	14:15	Unknown	Unknown
IF1	This tornado moved through Isla Cristina damaging boats, vehicles, roofs and trees.						

== November ==
IFU	IF0	IF0.5	IF1	IF1.5	IF2	IF2.5	IF3	IF4	IF5	Total
6	0	5	3	2	1	0	0	0	0	17

=== 2 November event ===
List of confirmed tornadoes – Saturday, 2 November 2024
IF#	Location	Region	Country	Start coord.	Time (UTC)	Path length	Max. width
IF0.5	Pegeia	Paphos	Cyprus	34.910°N 32.330°E	16:00	Unknown	Unknown
IF0.5	A tornado struck and damaged a banana plantation.						

=== 9 November event ===
List of confirmed tornadoes – Saturday, 9 November 2024
IF#	Location	Region	Country	Start coord.	Time (UTC)	Path length	Max. width
IFU	SW of El Haouaria	Nabeul	Tunisia	37.013°N 10.951°E	13:45	Unknown	Unknown
IFU	A landspout was observed.						

=== 10 November event ===
List of confirmed tornadoes – Sunday, 10 November 2024
IF#	Location	Region	Country	Start coord.	Time (UTC)	Path length	Max. width
IFU	W of Sant'Anna Arresi	Sardinia	Italy	38.990°N 8.573°E	14:30	Unknown	Unknown
IFU	A waterspout made landfall and caused no damage.						

=== 13 November event ===
List of confirmed tornadoes – Wednesday, 13 November 2024
IF#	Location	Region	Country	Start coord.	Time (UTC)	Path length	Max. width
IF0.5	Marbella (1st tornado)	Andalusia	Spain	36.489°N 4.949°W	10:00	Unknown	Unknown
IF0.5	A waterspout made landfall in Puerto Banús, damaging ships and outdoor furniture.						
IFU	Marbella (2nd tornado)	Andalusia	Spain	36.507°N 4.863°W	10:10	Unknown	Unknown
IFU	This waterspout moved ashore and quickly dissipated, causing no damage.						
IF1	Marbella (3rd tornado)	Andalusia	Spain	36.484°N 4.741°W	10:40	Unknown	Unknown
IF1	A waterspout moved inland, damaging the roof of a gas station.						

=== 17 November event ===
List of confirmed tornadoes – Sunday, 17 November 2024
IF#	Location	Region	Country	Start coord.	Time (UTC)	Path length	Max. width
IFU	Ponta do Sol	Madeira	Portugal	32.670°N 17.100°W	08:15	Unknown	Unknown
IFU	A waterspout made landfall. No damage occurred.						
IF0.5	Yialousa area	Famagusta	Cyprus	35.536°N 34.190°W	15:35	Unknown	Unknown
IF0.5	This tornado snapped large tree branches.						

=== 19 November event ===
List of confirmed tornadoes – Tuesday, 19 November 2024
IF#	Location	Region	Country	Start coord.	Time (UTC)	Path length	Max. width
IFU	SE of Orebić	Dubrovnik-Neretva	Croatia	42.966°N 17.235°E	10:30–10:36	Unknown	Unknown
IFU	A waterspout was filmed as it briefly made landfall, causing no damage.						

=== 20 November event ===
List of confirmed tornadoes – Wednesday, 20 November 2024
IF#	Location	Region	Country	Start coord.	Time (UTC)	Path length	Max. width
IF2	S of Melissa	Western Greece	Greece	37.926°N 21.371°E	09:35	6 km (3.7 mi)	Unknown
IF2	A strong tornado damaged stables, greenhouses and olive trees.						
IF0.5	Saint-Malo	Brittany	France	48.650°N 2.017°W	13:08	0.1 km (0.062 mi)	Unknown
IF0.5	A brief waterspout came ashore in Saint-Malo, producing light but noticeable damage. Wind gusts reached 116 km/h (72 mph), and minor impacts were observed to nearby infrastructure, including slight damage to the Môle des Noires station.						

=== 22 November event ===
List of confirmed tornadoes – Friday, 22 November 2024
IF#	Location	Region	Country	Start coord.	Time (UTC)	Path length	Max. width
IF1.5	Kemerağzı area	Antalya	Turkey	36.875°N 30.861°E	18:15	Unknown	Unknown
IF1.5	A waterspout made landfall inflicting damage to numerous greenhouses, some of which collapsed.						
IF0.5	Karaçallı area	Antalya	Turkey	36.891°N 30.871°E	19:00	Unknown	Unknown
IF0.5	This waterspout made landfall, damaging a few greenhouses.						
IF1	S of Petra	Epirus	Greece	39.126°N 20.812°E	20:45	Unknown	Unknown
IF1	A tornado moved through Strongylí damaging several structures and trees.						

=== 23 November event ===
List of confirmed tornadoes – Saturday, 23 November 2024
IF#	Location	Region	Country	Start coord.	Time (UTC)	Path length	Max. width
IF1.5	Karavca	Antalya	Turkey	36.858°N 31.554°E	20:55	Unknown	Unknown
IF1.5	This tornado impacted Karavca, damaging and partly destroying some roofs. Trees and powerlines were downed throughout the area. A sporting area was heavily damaged with some debris being between 100 m (110 yd) to 500 m (550 yd).						

=== 24 November event ===
List of confirmed tornadoes – Sunday, 24 November 2024
IF#	Location	Region	Country	Start coord.	Time (UTC)	Path length	Max. width
IF1	Akdere area	Mersin	Turkey	36.233°N 33.767°E	00:05	Unknown	Unknown
IF1	A tornado destroyed greenhouses and snapped trees.						

=== 30 November event ===
List of confirmed tornadoes – Saturday, 30 November 2024
IF#	Location	Region	Country	Start coord.	Time (UTC)	Path length	Max. width
IFU	NNW of Furnari	Sicily	Italy	38.124°N 15.106°E	13:27	Unknown	Unknown
IFU	A waterspout made landfall and caused no damage.						

== December ==
IFU	IF0	IF0.5	IF1	IF1.5	IF2	IF2.5	IF3	IF4	IF5	Total
3	1	2	3	3	0	0	0	0	0	12

=== 7 December event ===
List of confirmed tornadoes – Saturday, 7 December 2024
IF#	Location	Region	Country	Start coord.	Time (UTC)	Path length	Max. width
IF0	İskenderun	Hatay	Turkey	36.593°N 36.179°E	05:00	Unknown	Unknown
IF0	A tornado caused minor damage in İskenderun.						

=== 8 December event ===
List of confirmed tornadoes – Sunday, 8 December 2024
IF#	Location	Region	Country	Start coord.	Time (UTC)	Path length	Max. width
IF1.5	Ceraso	Campania	Italy	40.197°N 15.266°E	05:50	Unknown	Unknown
IF1.5	This brief tornado tore the roof sections from buildings and transported debris at least 250 m (270 yd), sucked out window shutters through a damaged roof, planted a steel board into an interior wall, and knocked down several road signs.						

=== 11 December event ===
List of confirmed tornadoes – Wednesday, 11 December 2024
IF#	Location	Region	Country	Start coord.	Time (UTC)	Path length	Max. width
IF0.5	Adapazarı	Sakarya	Turkey	40.795°N 30.406°E	02:00	Unknown	Unknown
IF0.5	A tornado damaged roofs and power poles.						

=== 14 December event ===
List of confirmed tornadoes – Saturday, 14 December 2024
IF#	Location	Region	Country	Start coord.	Time (UTC)	Path length	Max. width
IFU	S of Paola	Calabria	Italy	39.333°N 16.041°E	06:59	Unknown	Unknown
IFU	This waterspout moved ashore and caused no damage.						
IFU	N of Amantea	Calabria	Italy	39.144°N 16.066°E	07:12	Unknown	Unknown
IFU	No damage occurred with this waterspout that moved inland.						

=== 15 December event ===
List of confirmed tornadoes – Sunday, 15 December 2024
IF#	Location	Region	Country	Start coord.	Time (UTC)	Path length	Max. width
IF1	Agios Ilias area	Western Greece	Greece	37.717°N 21.331°E	00:59	Unknown	Unknown
IF1	A waterspout made landfall and moved inland, damaging olive trees, crops, greenhouses and the roofs of buildings.						

=== 21 December event ===
List of confirmed tornadoes – Saturday, 21 December 2024
IF#	Location	Region	Country	Start coord.	Time (UTC)	Path length	Max. width
IF1	Örenşehir area	Antalya	Turkey	36.698°N 31.662°E	15:30	Unknown	Unknown
IF1	Several trees and greenhouses were damaged.						

=== 22 December event ===
List of confirmed tornadoes – Sunday, 22 December 2024
IF#	Location	Region	Country	Start coord.	Time (UTC)	Path length	Max. width
IF0.5	Al-Hamidiyah	Tartus	Syria	34.712°N 35.945°E	04:40	Unknown	Unknown
IF0.5	A tornado moved through Al-Hamidiyah, damaging greenhouses of approximately twenty-five houses.						

=== 23 December event ===
List of confirmed tornadoes – Monday, 23 December 2024
IF#	Location	Region	Country	Start coord.	Time (UTC)	Path length	Max. width
IF1.5	Agrinio	Western Greece	Greece	38.625°N 21.390°E	13:26	Unknown	Unknown
IF1.5	This tornado struck the Municipal Sports Center of Agrinio, uprooting and snapping numerous trees, damaging roofs and power lines, and scouring the stadium surface.						
IFU	N of Anacapri	Campania	Italy	40.562°N 14.212°E	15:00	Unknown	Unknown
IFU	A waterspout made landfall on the island of Capri, causing no damage.						
IF1.5	W of Tympaki	Crete	Greece	35.072°N 24.758°E	18:05	Unknown	Unknown
IF1.5	A tornado caused extensive damage to olive trees, roofs and greenhouses.						

=== 27 December event ===
List of confirmed tornadoes – Friday, 27 December 2024
IF#	Location	Region	Country	Start coord.	Time (UTC)	Path length	Max. width
IF1	E of Narlı	Van	Turkey	37.866°N 43.102°E	19:40	Unknown	Unknown
IF1	This tornado caused damage to roofs of buildings.						

== See also ==
- Tornadoes of 2024
- List of European tornadoes and tornado outbreaks
