= Santa Cesarea Terme =

- Comune
- Comune di Santa Cesarea Terme
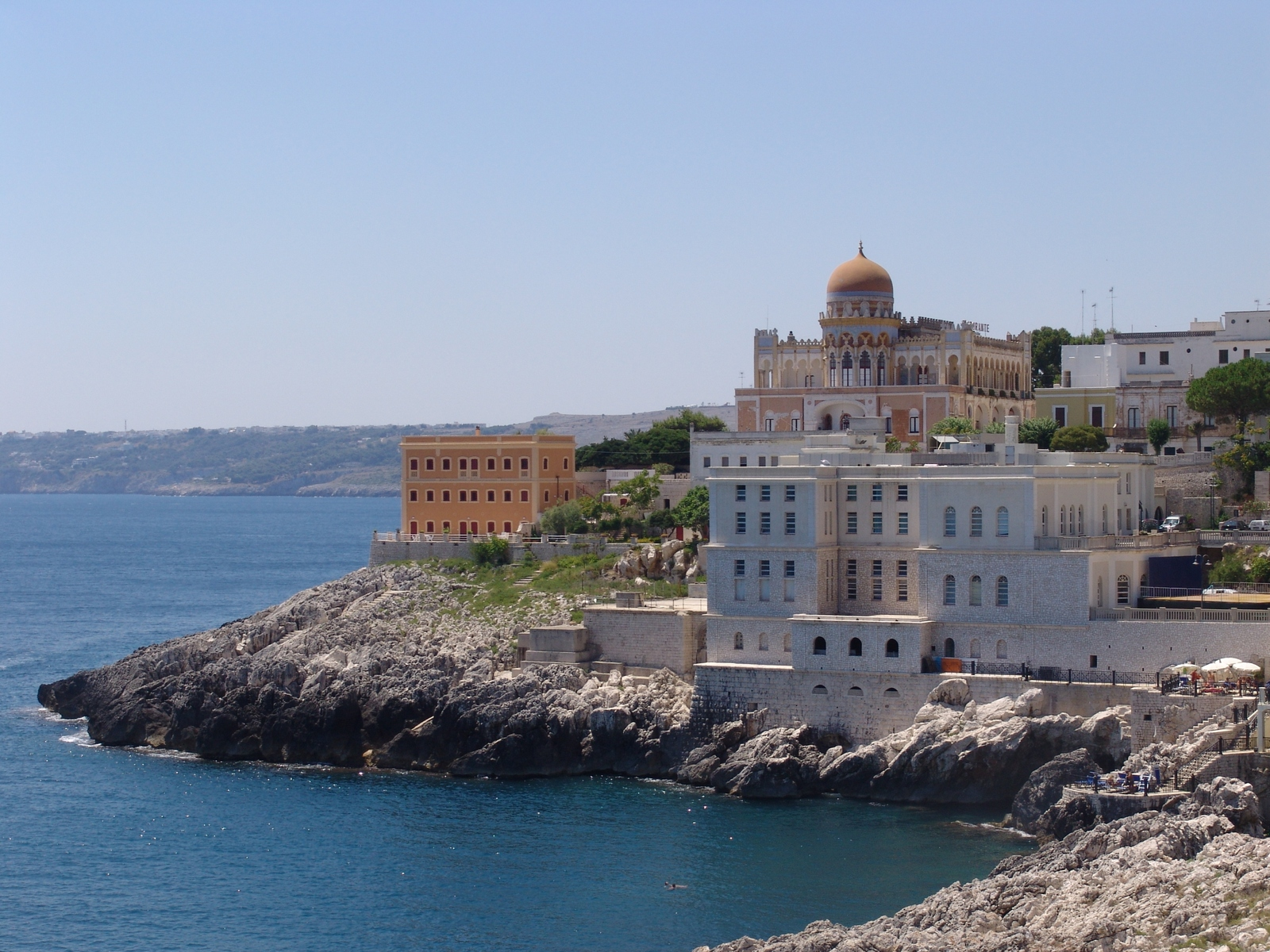
- View from the bay of Santa Cesarea Terme

- Location within Italy Location within Apulia
- Coordinates: 40°2′N 18°28′E
- Country: Italy
- Region: Apulia
- Province: Lecce (LE)
- Frazioni: Cerfignano, Porto Miggiano, Vitigliano

Government
  - Mayor: Pasquale Bleve

Area
  - Total: 26 km^{2} (10 sq mi)
- Elevation: 56 m (184 ft)

Population (31 December 2017)
  - Total: 3,017
  - Density: 120/km^{2} (300/sq mi)
- Demonym: Cesarini
- Time zone: UTC+1 (CET)
  - Summer (DST): UTC+2 (CEST)
- Postal code: 73020
- Dialing code: 0836
- Patron saint: Santa Cesarea
- Saint day: 12 September
- Website: Official website

Santa Cesarea Terme (Salentino: Santa Cisaria) is a town and comune in the province of Lecce, Apulia, southern Italy.

Situated on the coast at the entrance of the Strait of Otranto, on a part of the coast which comes down to the sea, the town of Santa Cesarea is one of the largest centers for thermal baths in the Salento. The use of the waters, coming from four caves, dates back to the 16th century. The economy of the whole town is based on the baths, which offer various facilities.
