= Kulaigyr =

Kulaigyr Құлаайғыр
- Selo
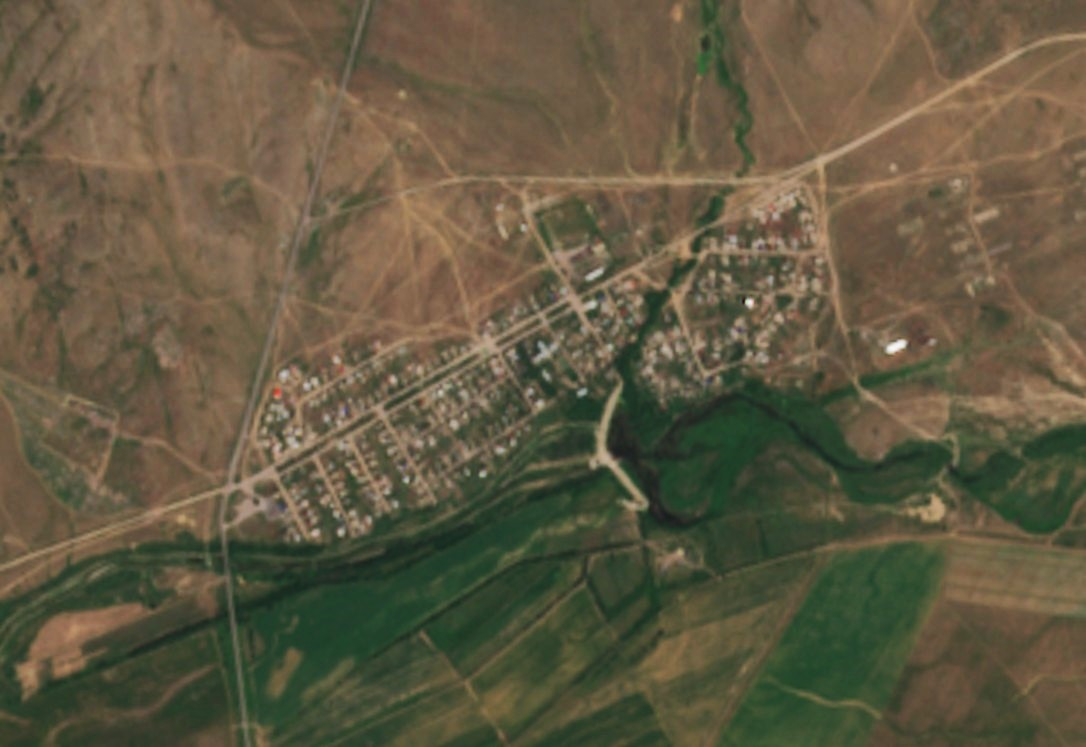
- A satellite image of the selo (Sentinel-2 L1C data, modified)

- Location in Kazakhstan
- Coordinates: 49°25′35″N 72°55′26″E
- Country: Kazakhstan
- Region: Karaganda Region

Population (2009)
  - Total: 1,467
- Postal code: 100112

Kulaigyr (Kazakh: Құлаайғыр) is a selo in the Abay District of the Karaganda Region in Kazakhstan. It is the administrative centre of the Kulaigyr Rural District. It is located approximately 20 km south-east of the city of Abay. Code CATO - 353261100.

== Population ==
In the year 1999, the population of the selo was 1550 people (821 men and 729 women). According to the 2009 census, there were 1467 people (718 men and 749 women).
