= Abzelilovo =

Abzelilovo Абзелилово Әбйәлил
- Village
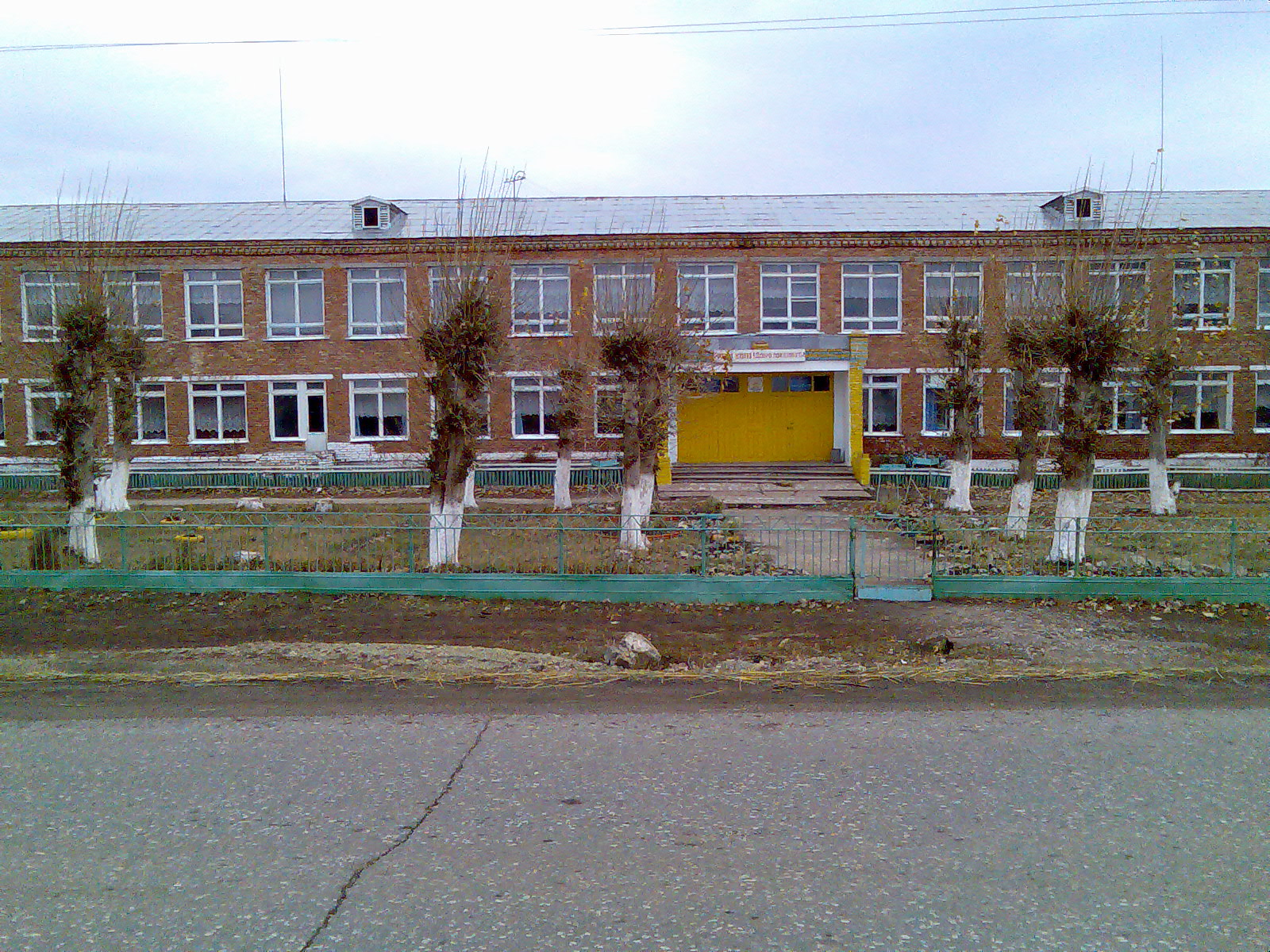
- School in Abzelilovo.

- Location within Bashkortostan Location within Russia
- Coordinates: 53°28′N 58°39′E
- Country: Russia
- Region: Bashkortostan
- District: Abzelilovsky District
- Time zone: [[UTC+5:00]]

Abzelilovo (Russian: Абзелилово) or Abduljalil (Bashkir: Әбйәлил, Äbyälil) is a rural locality (a village) in Tashtimerovsky Selsoviet of Abzelilovsky District, Bashkortostan, Russia. The population was 496 as of 2010. There are 11 streets.

== Geography ==
Abzelilovo is located 21 km north of Askarovo (the district's administrative centre) by road. Tashtimerovo is the nearest rural locality.

== Ethnicity ==
The village is inhabited by Bashkirs and others.
