= Matveyevskaya, Vashkinsky District, Vologda Oblast =

Matveyevskaya Матвеевская
- Village
- Location within Vologda Oblast Location within Russia
- Coordinates: 60°37′N 37°58′E
- Country: Russia
- Region: Vologda Oblast
- District: Vashkinsky District
- Time zone: UTC+3:00

Matveyevskaya (Russian: Матвеевская) is a rural locality (a village) in Ivanovskoye Rural Settlement, Vashkinsky District, Vologda Oblast, Russia. The population was 5 as of 2002.

== Geography ==
Matveyevskaya is located 44 km north of Lipin Bor (the district's administrative centre) by road. Semenovskaya is the nearest rural locality.
