= Atlegach =

Atlegach Атлегач
- Selo
- Location within Bashkortostan Location within Russia
- Coordinates: 56°03′N 55°02′E
- Country: Russia
- Region: Bashkortostan
- District: Yanaulsky District
- Time zone: UTC+5:00

Atlegach (Russian: Атлегач; Bashkir: Атлығас, Atlığas) is a rural locality (a selo) in Izhboldinsky Selsoviet, Yanaulsky District, Bashkortostan, Russia. The population was 398 as of 2010. There are 9 streets.

== Geography ==
Atlegach is located 27 km south of Yanaul (the district's administrative centre) by road. Novotroitsk is the nearest rural locality.
