= Armanis =

Armanis Արմանիս
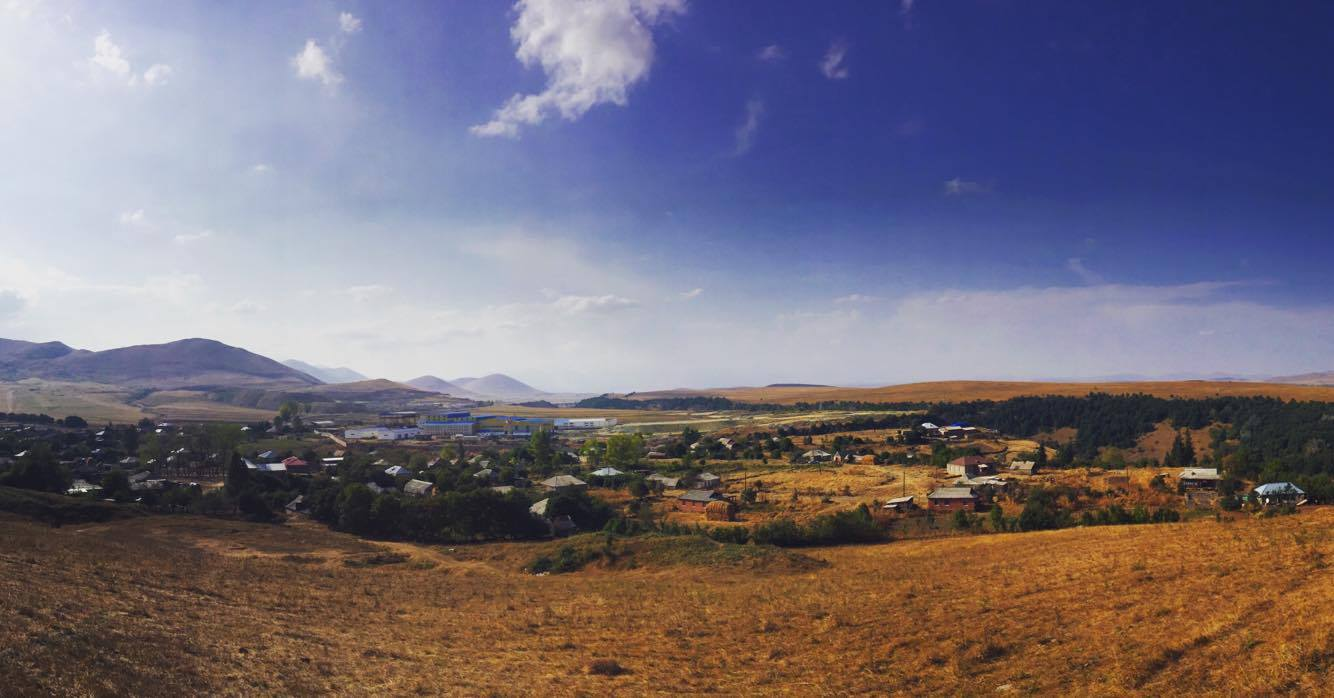

- Location within Armenia
- Coordinates: 41°00′29″N 44°19′45″E
- Country: Armenia
- Marz (Province): Lori Province
- Elevation: 1,520 m (4,990 ft)

Population (2011)
  - Total: 357
- Time zone: UTC+4 ( )
  - Summer (DST): UTC+5 ( )

Armanis (Armenian: Արմանիս) is a town in the Lori Province of Armenia.
