= 2nd Smirnovka =

2nd Smirnovka 2-я Смирновка
- Settlement
- Location within Moscow Oblast Location within Russia
- Coordinates: 56.234444°N 36.900278°E
- Country: Russia
- Region: Moscow Oblast
- District: Solnechnogorsky District
- Time zone: UTC+03:00

2nd Smirnovka (Russian: 2-я Смирно́вка) is a rural locality (a settlement) in Smirnovskoye Rural Settlement of Solnechnogorsky District, Russia. The population was 68 as of 2010.

== Geography ==
2nd Smirnovka is located 8 km northwest of Solnechnogorsk (the district's administrative centre) by road. Moshnitsy is the nearest rural locality.

== Streets ==
- Dachnaya
- Kirpichnogo zavoda
