= Abborrberget =

- Location within Södermanland Location within Sweden
- Coordinates: 59°23′N 17°03′E
- Country: Sweden
- Province: Södermanland
- County: Södermanland County
- Municipality: Strängnäs Municipality

Area
  - Total: 1.38 km^{2} (0.53 sq mi)

Population (31 December 2020)
  - Total: 3,039
  - Density: 2,200/km^{2} (5,700/sq mi)
- Time zone: UTC+1 (CET)
  - Summer (DST): UTC+2 (CEST)

Abborrberget is a locality situated in Strängnäs Municipality, Södermanland County, Sweden with 2,141 inhabitants in 2010.

== Buildings and landmarks ==
The area is commonly divided into Abborrberget, northwest of Tosterö Bridge, and Sundby, to its east and northeast. It mainly consists of residential buildings, schools, preschools, businesses, and woodland. Abborrberget has a municipal beach near the Bresshammars hage nature reserve. Sundby's former hospital cemetery contains the graves of staff and patients from the former psychiatric hospital Sundby Hospital.
