= Siñgel =

Siñgel Сиңгел
- selo
- Location within Tatarstan
- Country: Russia
- Region: Tatarstan
- District: Layış District
- Municipality: Ükräç-Qultıq rural settlement

Population (2002)
  - Total: 236
- Time zone: UTC+3:00

Siñgel (Tatar: Сиңгел, romanized: Siñgel) is a rural locality (a selo) in Layış District, Tatarstan. The population was 231 as of 2010. Siñgel is located 79 km from Lаyış, district's administrative centre, and 50 km from Ԛazan, republic's capital, by road. The earliest known record of the settlement dates from 16th century. There are 5 streets in the village.
