= Mitrofanovo, Vashkinsky District, Vologda Oblast =

Mitrofanovo Митрофаново
- Village
- Location within Vologda Oblast Location within Russia
- Coordinates: 60°19′N 37°54′E
- Country: Russia
- Region: Vologda Oblast
- District: Vashkinsky District
- Time zone: UTC+3:00

Mitrofanovo (Russian: Митрофаново) is a rural locality (a village) in Vasilyevskoye Rural Settlement, Vashkinsky District, Vologda Oblast, Russia. The population was 11 as of 2002.

== Geography ==
Mitrofanovo is located 9 km northwest of Lipin Bor (the district's administrative centre) by road. Skokovo is the nearest rural locality.
