= Severny, Republic of Bashkortostan =

Severny Северный
- Village
- Location within Bashkortostan Location within Russia
- Coordinates: 53°07′N 58°47′E
- Country: Russia
- Region: Bashkortostan
- District: Abzelilovsky District

Population (2010)
  - Total: 292
- Time zone: UTC+5:00

Severny (Russian: Северный) is a rural locality (a village) in Almukhametovsky Selsoviet, Abzelilovsky District, Bashkortostan, Russia. The population was 292 as of 2010. There are 3 streets.

== Geography ==
Severny is located 41 km southeast of Askarovo (the district's administrative centre) by road. Sukhoye Ozero is the nearest rural locality.
