= Gonokhovo =

Gonokhovo Гонохово
- Selo
- Location within Altai Krai Location within Russia
- Coordinates: 52°56′N 81°17′E
- Country: Russia
- Region: Altai Krai
- District: Zavyalovsky District
- Time zone: UTC+7:00

Gonokhovo (Russian: Гонохово) is a rural locality (a selo) and the administrative center of Gonokhovsky Selsoviet, Zavyalovsky District, Altai Krai, Russia. The population was 1,787 as of 2013. There are 20 streets.

== Geography ==
Gonokhovo is located 37 km northeast of Zavyalovo (the district's administrative centre) by road. Dobraya Volya is the nearest rural locality.
