= Al-Karimah =

Town in northwestern Syria

Al-Karimah الكريمة
- Town
- Location in Syria
- Coordinates: 34°40′4″N 36°4′29″E
- Country: Syria
- Governorate: Tartus
- District: Tartus
- Subdistrict: Karimah

Population (2004)
  - Total: 3,461

Al-Karimah (Arabic: الكريمة; also spelled Karto al-Karimeh) is a small town in northwestern Syria, administratively part of the Tartus Governorate. It is located in the Akkar Plain just north of the border with Lebanon and southeast of al-Hamidiyah. According to the Syria Central Bureau of Statistics (CBS), al-Karimah had a population of 3,461 in the 2004 census. It is the administrative center of the Karimah Subdistrict (nahiyah) which consisted of 12 localities with a collective population of 17,271. Its inhabitants are predominantly Alawites.
