= Touillon =

- Commune
- Coat of arms
- Location of Touillon
- Location within France Location within Bourgogne-Franche-Comté
- Coordinates: 47°39′10″N 4°25′38″E
- Country: France
- Region: Bourgogne-Franche-Comté
- Department: Côte-d'Or
- Arrondissement: Montbard
- Canton: Montbard
- Intercommunality: Montbardois

Government
  - Mayor (2020–2026): Gilles Guyard
- Area^{1}: 36.98 km^{2} (14.28 sq mi)
- Elevation: 350 m (1,150 ft)
- Highest elevation: 397 m (1,302 ft)
- Lowest elevation: 239 m (784 ft)
- Population (2023): 461
  - Density: 12.5/km^{2} (32.3/sq mi)
- Time zone: UTC+01:00 (CET)
  - Summer (DST): UTC+02:00 (CEST)
- INSEE/Postal code: 21641 /21500
- ^{1} French Land Register data, which excludes lakes, ponds, glaciers > 1 km^{2} (0.386 sq mi or 247 acres) and river estuaries.

Touillon (French pronunciation: [tujɔ̃]) is a commune in the Côte-d'Or department in eastern France.

== Population ==
Historical population
Year	Pop.	±% p.a.
1968	487	—
1975	408	−2.50%
1982	451	+1.44%
1990	493	+1.12%
1999	456	−0.86%
2007	413	−1.23%
2012	462	+2.27%
2017	466	+0.17%
2023	461	−0.18%
Source: INSEE

== See also ==
- Communes of the Côte-d'Or department
