= Kružno =

Kružno Kruzsnó
- Municipality
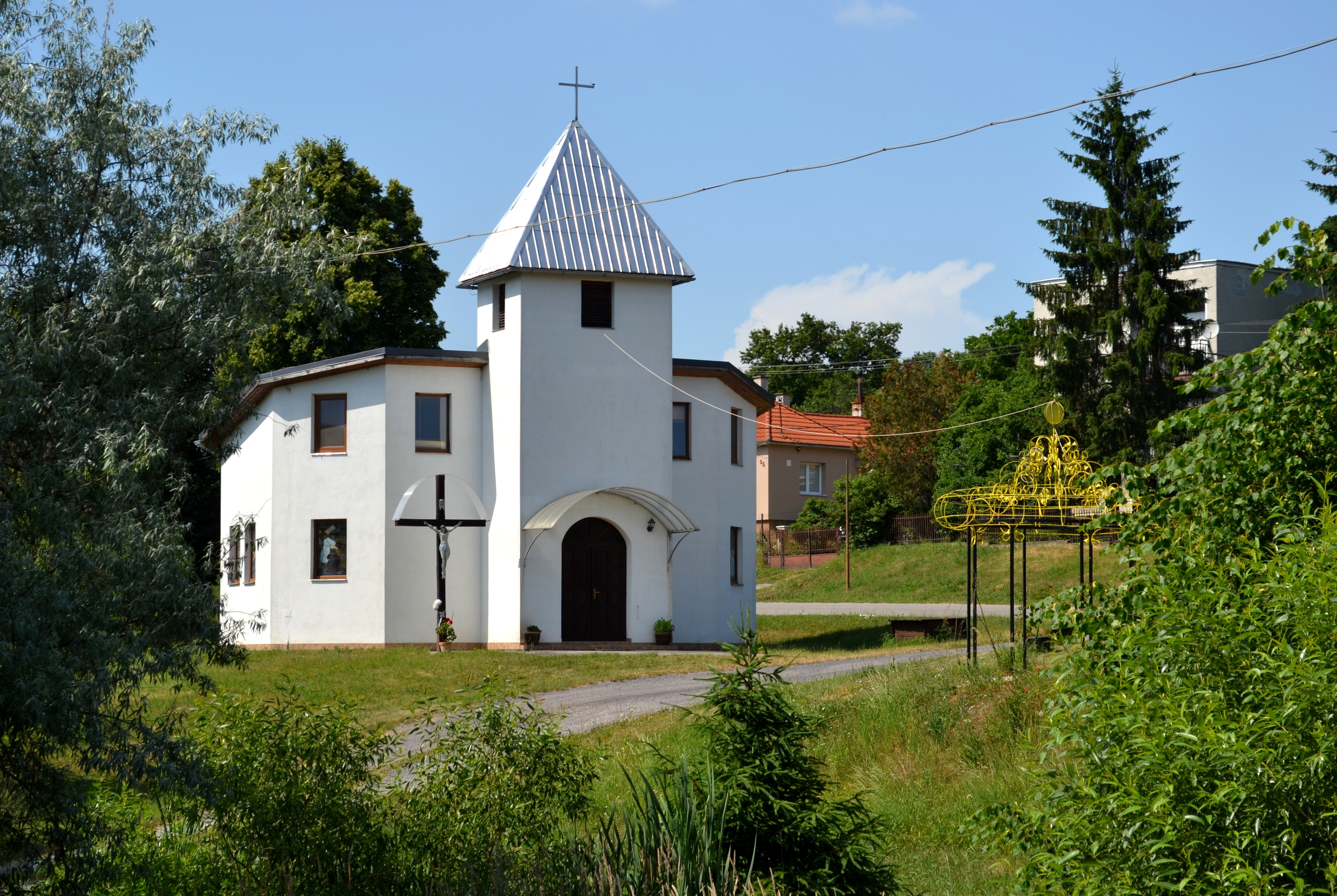

- Flag

- Location of Kružno in the Banská Bystrica Region Location of Kružno in Slovakia
- Coordinates: 48.40°N 19.92°E
- Country: Slovakia
- Region: Banská Bystrica Region
- District: Rimavská Sobota District
- First mentioned: 1922

Area
  - Total: 6.19 km^{2} (2.39 sq mi)
- Elevation: 271 m (889 ft)

Population (2025)
  - Total: 359
- Time zone: UTC+1 (CET)
  - Summer (DST): UTC+2 (CEST)
- Postal code: 979 01
- Area code: +421 47
- Vehicle registration plate (until 2022): RS
- Website: www.kruzno.sk

Kružno (Hungarian: Kruzsnó) is a village and municipality in the Rimavská Sobota District of the Banská Bystrica Region of southern Slovakia. The village is typical for more spaces between houses. which is not that typical in surrounding villages. Recently Kružnno attracts bicycle tourists. In Kružno there is a park, church, kindergarten and football pitch.

== Geography ==
The municipality lies at an altitude of 271 metres (889 ft) and covers an area of 6.19 km^{2} (2.39 sq mi) (2025).

== Population ==
Population statistic (10 years)
Year	1995	2005	2015	2025
Count	326	351	362	359
Difference		+7.66%	+3.13%	−0.82%

Population statistic
Year	2024	2025
Count	360	359
Difference		−0.27%

It has a population of 359 people (31 December 2025).

=== Ethnicity ===
Census 2021 (1+ %)
Ethnicity	Number	Fraction
Slovak	335	96.54%
Hungarian	10	2.88%
Total	347	

In year 2021 was 347 people by ethnicity 335 as Slovak, 10 as Hungarian, 3 as Romanian, 3 as Not found out, 3 as German and 2 as Czech.

Note on population: The difference values of population numbers in the table "Population statistic" and in the sections "Ethnicity" & "Religion" is caused by the use of various statistical methods.

=== Religion ===
Census 2021 (1+ %)
Religion	Number	Fraction
Roman Catholic Church	203	58.5%
None	105	30.26%
Evangelical Church	21	6.05%
Not found out	14	4.03%
Total	347	

In year 2021 was 347 people by religion 203 from Roman Catholic Church, 105 from None, 21 from Evangelical Church, 14 from Not found out, 1 from Calvinist Church, 1 from Christian Congregations in Slovakia, 1 from Other and 1 from Ad hoc movements.
