= Turovsky =

Turovsky is a Czech, Slovak, Ukrainian, Belarusian and Russian surname, it may refer to:

Turovsky (Ukrainian: Туровський, Russian: Туровский). Turovska, Turovskaya are Ukrainian feminine variation.

- Kirill Turovsky (1130–1182), Russian Orthodox priest and saint
- Genya Turovskaya, American poet
- JoAnn Turovsky, American harpist
- Mikhaylo Turovskyy (born 1933), Ukrainian-American artist and writer
- Roman Turovsky-Savchuk, Ukrainian-American artist and composer
- Yuli Turovsky (1939–2013), Canadian cellist and conductor

== See also ==
- Wólka Turowska, a village in the Gmina Grójec
- Turowski
- Turowicz
- Turów
- Turov
- Turaŭ (Turaw)
