= Turowski =

Turowski (feminine: Turowska, plural: Turowscy) is a Polish surname. It may refer to:

- Janusz Turowski (born 1961), Polish football coach
- Janusz Turowski (1927–2020), Polish engineer
- Józef Turowski (died 1989), Polish military historian

== Turovsky ==
Turovsky (Ukrainian: Туровський, Russian: Туровский), Turovska, Turovskaya are Ukrainian variants.

- Kirilo Turovskyy (Polish: Cyryl Turowski)
- Genya Turovskaya, a Ukrainian-American poet
- JoAnn Turovsky, American harp teacher
- Mikhaylo Turovskyy, American-Ukrainian artist
- Roman Turovsky-Savchuk, Ukrainian-American composer

== See also ==
- Wólka Turowska, a village in the Gmina Grójec
- Turowicz
- Turów
- Turov
- Turaŭ (Turaw)
