= Burdukovo =

Burdukovo may refer to the following rural localities in Russia:

- Burdukovo, Pribaykalsky District, Republic of Buryatia
- Burdukovo, Syamzhensky District, Vologda Oblast
- Burdukovo, Ust-Kubinsky District, Vologda Oblast
- Burdukovo, Vologodsky District, Vologda Oblast
