= Koma, Republic of Buryatia =

Koma Кома
- Selo
- Location within Republic of Buryatia Location within Russia
- Coordinates: 52°09′N 107°30′E
- Country: Russia
- Region: Republic of Buryatia
- District: Pribaykalsky District
- Time zone: UTC+8:00

Koma (Russian: Кома) is a rural locality (a selo) in Pribaykalsky District, Republic of Buryatia, Russia. The population was 743 as of 2010. There are 13 streets.

== Geography ==
Koma is located 11 km (6.8 mi) southwest of Turuntayevo (the district's administrative centre) by road. Itantsa is the nearest rural locality.
