= Turka =

Turka may refer to:

== Places ==
- Turka, Chełm County, in Lublin Voivodeship (east Poland)
- Turka, Lublin County, in Lublin Voivodeship (east Poland)
- Turka, Gmina Ostrów Mazowiecka, in Masovian Voivodeship (central Poland)
- Turka, Republic of Buryatia, a rural locality in Russia
- Turka, Ukraine, a city in Lviv Oblast, Ukraine
- Turka Raion, abolished raion in Lviv Oblast
- Turka (Lake Baikal), a river in Buryatia, Russia
- Turka (Iren), a river in Perm Krai, Russia

== Other uses ==
- Cola Turka, a Turkish cola soft drink
- Turka (fly), a genus of flies
- Turka language, a Gur language spoken by the Turka people in Burkina Faso
- Turka people, an ethnic group in Burkina Faso
- University of Tartu Folk Art Ensemble (TÜ RKA), an Estonian folk dance group
