= Zyryansk =

Zyryansk Зырянск
- Selo
- Location within Republic of Buryatia Location within Russia
- Coordinates: 52°15′N 107°46′E
- Country: Russia
- Region: Republic of Buryatia
- District: Pribaykalsky District
- Time zone: UTC+8:00

Zyryansk (Russian: Зырянск) is a rural locality (a selo) in Pribaykalsky District, Republic of Buryatia, Russia. The population was 661 as of 2010. There are 8 streets.

== Geography ==
Zyryansk is located 15 km northeast of Turuntayevo (the district's administrative centre) by road. Karymsk is the nearest rural locality.
