= Gurulyovo =

Gurulyovo Гурулёво
- Selo
- Location within Republic of Buryatia Location within Russia
- Coordinates: 52°24′N 107°55′E
- Country: Russia
- Region: Republic of Buryatia
- District: Pribaykalsky District
- Time zone: UTC+8:00

Gurulyovo (Russian: Гурулёво) is a rural locality (a selo) in Pribaykalsky District, Republic of Buryatia, Russia. The population was 231 as of 2010. There are 4 streets.

== Geography ==
Gurulyovo is located 34 km northeast of Turuntayevo (the district's administrative centre) by road. Nesterovo is the nearest rural locality.
