= Goryachinsk =

Goryachinsk Горячинск
- Selo
- Location within Republic of Buryatia Location within Russia
- Coordinates: 52°59′N 108°18′E
- Country: Russia
- Region: Republic of Buryatia
- District: Pribaykalsky District
- Time zone: UTC+8:00

Goryachinsk (Russian: Горячинск) is a rural locality (a selo) in Pribaykalsky District, Republic of Buryatia, Russia. The population was 967 as of 2010. There are 31 streets. The town is home to the State Center for Oriental Medicine that offers a famous fasting cure.

== Geography ==
Goryachinsk is located 121 km north of Turuntayevo (the district's administrative centre) by road. Turka is the nearest rural locality.
