= Ostrog, Republic of Buryatia =

Ostrog Острог
- Selo
- Location within Republic of Buryatia Location within Russia
- Coordinates: 52°09′N 107°28′E
- Country: Russia
- Region: Republic of Buryatia
- District: Pribaykalsky District
- Time zone: UTC+8:00

Ostrog (Russian: Острог) is a rural locality (a selo) in Pribaykalsky District, Republic of Buryatia, Russia. The population was 100 as of 2010. There are 3 streets.

== Geography ==
Ostrog is located 13 km southwest of Turuntayevo (the district's administrative centre) by road. Koma is the nearest rural locality.
