= Zasukhino =

Zasukhino Засухино
- Selo
- Location within Republic of Buryatia Location within Russia
- Coordinates: 52°11′N 107°36′E
- Country: Russia
- Region: Republic of Buryatia
- District: Pribaykalsky District
- Time zone: UTC+8:00

Zasukhino (Russian: Засухино) is a rural locality (a selo) in Pribaykalsky District, Republic of Buryatia, Russia. The population was 46 as of 2010.

== Geography ==
Zasukhino is located 3 km west of Turuntayevo (the district's administrative centre) by road. Turuntayevo is the nearest rural locality.
