= Sobolikha =

Sobolikha Соболиха
- Settlement
- Location within Republic of Buryatia Location within Russia
- Coordinates: 52°55′N 108°23′E
- Country: Russia
- Region: Republic of Buryatia
- District: Pribaykalsky District
- Time zone: UTC+8:00

Sobolikha (Russian: Соболиха) is a rural locality (a settlement) in Pribaykalsky District, Republic of Buryatia, Russia. The population was 186 as of 2010. There are 4 streets.

== Geography ==
Sobolikha is located by the Turka River, 125 km northeast of Turuntayevo (the district's administrative centre) by road. Turka is the nearest rural locality.
