= Turuntayevo =

Turuntayevo (Russian: Турунтаево) is the name of several rural localities in Russia:

- Turuntayevo, Republic of Buryatia, a selo in Turuntayevsky Selsoviet of Pribaykalsky District of the Republic of Buryatia
- Turuntayevo, Tomsk Oblast, a selo in Tomsky District of Tomsk Oblast
