= Zolotoy Klyuch =

Zolotoy Klyuch Золотой Ключ
- Settlement
- Location within Republic of Buryatia Location within Russia
- Coordinates: 52°59′N 108°39′E
- Country: Russia
- Region: Republic of Buryatia
- District: Pribaykalsky District
- Time zone: UTC+8:00

Zolotoy Klyuch (Russian: Золотой Ключ) is a rural locality (a settlement) in Pribaykalsky District, Republic of Buryatia, Russia. The population was 95 as of 2010. There are 3 streets.

== Geography ==
Zolotoy Klyuch is located by the Turka River, 157 km northeast of Turuntayevo (the district's administrative centre) by road. Turka is the nearest rural locality.
