= Staroye Tataurovo =

Staroye Tataurovo Старое Татаурово
- Selo
- Location within Republic of Buryatia Location within Russia
- Coordinates: 52°05′N 107°28′E
- Country: Russia
- Region: Republic of Buryatia
- District: Pribaykalsky District
- Time zone: UTC+8:00

Staroye Tataurovo (Russian: Старое Татаурово) is a rural locality (a selo) in Pribaykalsky District, Republic of Buryatia, Russia. The population was 992 as of 2010. There are 8 streets.

== Geography ==
Staroye Tataurovo is located 24 km southwest of Turuntayevo (the district's administrative centre) by road. Burdukovo is the nearest rural locality.
