= Mostovka =

Mostovka Мостовка
- Selo
- Location within Republic of Buryatia Location within Russia
- Coordinates: 52°05′N 107°01′E
- Country: Russia
- Region: Republic of Buryatia
- District: Pribaykalsky District
- Time zone: UTC+8:00

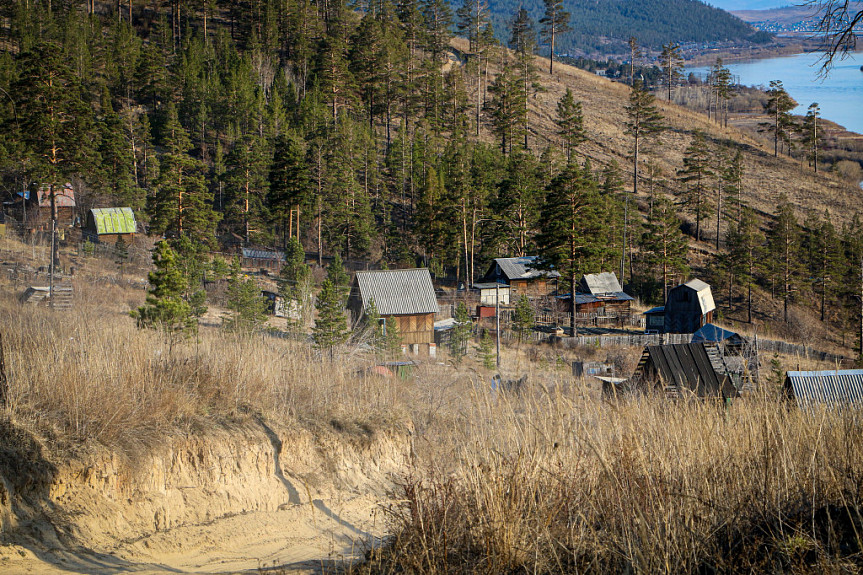
Mostovka village

Mostovka (Russian: Мостовка) is a rural locality (a selo) in Pribaykalsky District, Republic of Buryatia, Russia. The population was 889 as of 2010. There are 17 streets.

== Geography ==
Mostovka is located 48 km southwest of Turuntayevo (the district's administrative centre) by road. Talovka is the nearest rural locality.
