= Khalzanovo =

Khalzanovo Халзаново
- Selo
- Location within Republic of Buryatia Location within Russia
- Coordinates: 52°13′N 107°40′E
- Country: Russia
- Region: Republic of Buryatia
- District: Pribaykalsky District
- Time zone: UTC+8:00

Khalzanovo (Russian: Халзаново) is a rural locality (a selo) in Pribaykalsky District, Republic of Buryatia, Russia. The population was 120 as of 2010. There are 2 streets.

== Geography ==
Khalzanovo is located 4 km northeast of Turuntayevo (the district's administrative centre) by road. Turuntayevo is the nearest rural locality.
