= Burlya =

Burlya Бурля
- Settlement
- Location within Republic of Buryatia Location within Russia
- Coordinates: 52°21′N 107°44′E
- Country: Russia
- Region: Republic of Buryatia
- District: Pribaykalsky District
- Time zone: UTC+8:00

Burlya (Russian: Бурля) is a rural locality (a settlement) in Pribaykalsky District, Republic of Buryatia, Russia. The population was 43 as of 2010.

== Geography ==
Burlya is located 37 km north of Turuntayevo (the district's administrative centre) by road. Baturino is the nearest rural locality.
