= Talovka (selo), Republic of Buryatia =

Talovka Таловка
- Selo
- Location within Republic of Buryatia Location within Russia
- Coordinates: 52°06′N 107°04′E
- Country: Russia
- Region: Republic of Buryatia
- District: Pribaykalsky District
- Time zone: UTC+8:00

Talovka (Russian: Таловка) is a rural locality (a selo) in Pribaykalsky District, Republic of Buryatia, Russia. The population was 161 as of 2010. There are 6 streets.

== Geography ==
Talovka is located 44 km southwest of Turuntayevo (the district's administrative centre) by road. Yugovo is the nearest rural locality.
