= Kika, Republic of Buryatia =

Kika Кика
- Settlement
- Location within Republic of Buryatia Location within Russia
- Coordinates: 52°29′N 108°01′E
- Country: Russia
- Region: Republic of Buryatia
- District: Pribaykalsky District
- Time zone: UTC+8:00

Kika (Russian: Кика) is a rural locality (a settlement) in Pribaykalsky District, Republic of Buryatia, Russia. As of the 2010 census, there was 508 people living There are 10 streets as of now.

== Geography ==
Kika is located 48 km northeast of Turuntayevo (the district's administrative centre) by road. Turulevo is the nearest rural locality.
