= Kosmin =

Kosmin or Kośmin may refer to:

- Kośmin, Lublin Voivodeship, a village in eastern Poland in Puławy County
- Kośmin, Masovian Voivodeship a village in east-central Poland in Grójec County
- Paul J. Kosmin (born 1984), American historian of antiquity
- Barry Kosmin, American professor of public policy and scholar of religion and culture
