= The Daltonlar =

Turkish organised crime group

The Daltonlar (Daltonlar çetesi, “the Daltons”) is an Istanbul based crime organization, consisting mainly of young men and minors. Turkish prosecutors accuse it of armed attacks, murder, threats, extortion and drug trafficking. Its name is said to come from the Dalton brothers of the Lucky Luke comics. Turkish reports name Beratcan Gökdemir as its leader, said he is wanted on an Interpol red notice and place him outside of Turkey. The group is often discussed along with the network of Barış Boyun, though Turkish police described them as two separate organizations led by Boyun and Gökdemir respectively.

Turkish prosecutors say the group operates along a Turkey-Europe axis and uses social media and music videos to recruit young people. Police in Germany, France and Greece have investigated alleged weapon trafficking linked to the group. In October 2026 Der Spiegel reported that the group may have been involved in an arson on a Starlink ground station in Poland. Poland blamed Russia for the attack. Any link to the Daltonlar remains unproven.

== Background ==
Accounts of the group's origins differ. Turkish media reports describe Boyun and three associates as starting out as a street gang, carrying out small robberies and extortion. A 2026 Der Spiegel reports claims they were established in 2024. Some English language reports have used "Daltonlar" for Boyun's network itself. Turkish authorities described the Daltonlar as part of wave of youth led groups behind a rise in gun violence in Istanbul. Interior Minister Ali Yerlikaya has said such groups use minors as motorcycle drivers, lookouts and shooters in drive by attacks. Rights advocates say many recruits come from poor neighbourhoods with weak ties to school and work.

=== Prosecutions in Turkey ===
In October 2025, Istanbul court arrested from a group of 168 detainees in operations against the Daltonlar, with searches turning up 259 unlicensed handguns. In December 2025, prosecutors said 34 minors faced charges over 33 incidents tied to the group. An Istanbul court has also handed down multiple life sentences to senior figures in a trail with hundreds of defendants. On 27 October 2026 Turkish authorities detained 85 suspected members, including 35 minors, in raids across 30 provinces.

=== Relationship with Barış Boyun ===
Boyun was arrested in Italy in 2024 in a joint Italian-Turkish operation targeting his network in Italy, Germany, Switzerland and Turkey and remained there in custody while Italian courts considered Turkey's extradition request. Turkish investigations have linked his group to the Daltonlar.

== European activity ==
=== Germany and Poland ===
On 23 September 2026, a Starlink station in the Polish village of Wola Krobowska was set on fire. Polish officials said that two Turkish citizens were arrested in Germany and accused of deliberately setting the fire. Der Spiegel sources said the two may have belonged to the Daltonlar or acted on instructions from their members. Poland's special services coordinator accused Russian intelligence of the arson. Turkish investigators suspect the Daltonlar is directed from Russia by Gökdemir.

=== France ===
In September 2026 Euronews reported that at least 8 Turkish nationals had been arrested in France in an arms trafficking investigation linked to the Daltonlars with around 150 pistole seized. Le Parisien reported the pistols were seized when the suspects returned from Hanover, Germany, to the Paris region.

=== Greece ===
On 3 October 2025, Greek police arrested 13 Turkish nationals near Soufli, in the Evros region with 147 pistols and 190 cartridges. Authorities suspected the weapons were intended for the Daltonlar, which they linked to violence incidents in Greece and Spain. The defendants deny any connection to the weapons and say they are followers of the Gülen movement who came to seek asylum.

== Group leader ==
Beratcan Gökdemir, known as "Can Dalton", is named in Turkish reporting as the group's leader. He is wanted on an Interpol red notice and his case was separated from the main Istanbul trial because he could not be apprehended. According to ARD citing Turkish investigation documents, he faces charges including murder, incitement to murder, armed attacks and robbery. He is assumed to be in Russia even though accounts differ on his status. Turkish media claims he was arrested there back in 2024 and the Turkey has repeatedly asked Russia to extradite him. In June 2026 Justice Minister Akın Gürlek said Ankara has renewed the request. ADR reported that that Russia had not handed him over and that Gökdemir lives in a place provided by the Russian government and he runs the organization from there.

== See also ==
- Crime in Turkey
- Foxtrot (criminal network)
- Russian sabotage operations in Europe
- Starlink in the Russo-Ukrainian War
- Sedat Peker
