= Crime in Turkey =

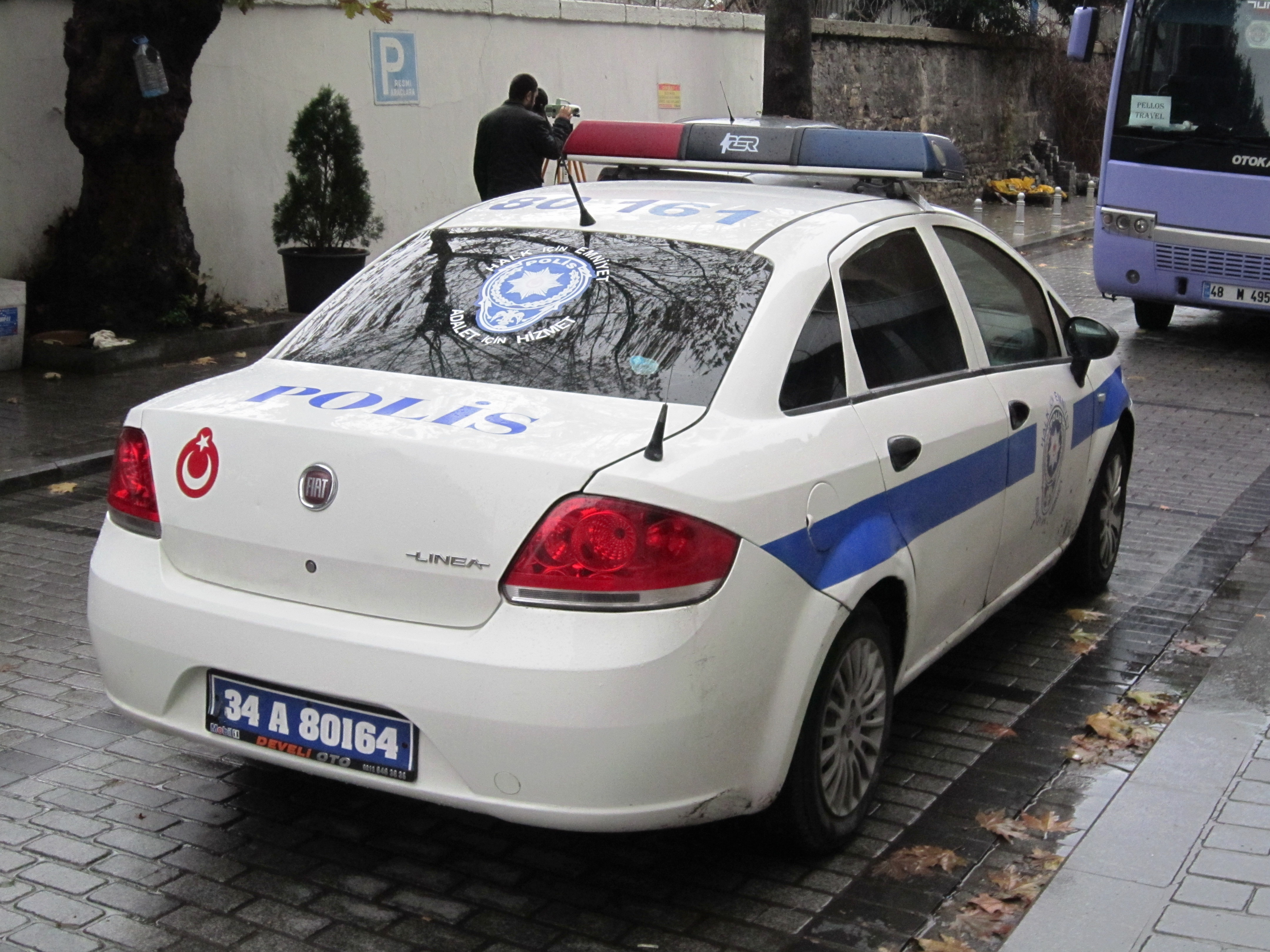
Turkish police car from 2010s.

Crime in Turkey is combated by the Turkish police and other agencies. In 1994, the number of arrested prisoners was recorded as 38,931; 20 years later, as of the beginning of October 2014, the number of prisoners has reached 152,335. According to the data provided by the Ministry of Justice, the terrorism and homicide rates have been decreasing year by year after 2014 in Turkey and terrorism is almost never seen.

== Crime by type ==
=== Murder ===
According to the United Nations Office on Drugs and Crime (UNODC), the intentional homicide rate in Turkey was 2.40 per 100,000 population in 2019, 2.49 in 2020, 2.49 in 2021, 2.63 in 2022, 3.24 in 2023 and 2.41 in 2024.

The Crime Incident Database for Turkey, which is compiled from press reports, documented 1,276 people intentionally killed in 2023, 1,204 in 2024 and 1,063 in 2025. Because the database covers only incidents reported in the press, these figures are lower than the true totals. The same project's coverage-adjusted estimate puts the number of people intentionally killed in Turkey in 2025 at about 2,270 (range 1,840–2,710), or 2.6 per 100,000 population.

Homicides and armed assaults documented in the press
Year	People killed	Homicide incidents	Armed assault incidents
2023	1,276	1,107	1,616
2024	1,204	1,042	1,534
2025	1,063	915	1,517

Of the 915 homicide incidents documented in 2025, 550 involved a firearm, 206 a knife or other sharp instrument, and 124 a beating. In the 616 incidents where the press report stated the relationship between perpetrator and victim, the perpetrator was a family member in 280, a spouse or partner in 188, an acquaintance in 117 and a stranger in 31. The provinces with the most documented victims in 2025 were Istanbul (186), İzmir (60), Adana (54), Ankara (40) and Antalya (40).

The database separately tracks women killed by a spouse, partner or family member; it documented 264 such incidents in 2023, 261 in 2024 and 236 in 2025.

==== Honour killing ====
A June 2008 report by the Turkish Prime Ministry's Human Rights Directorate said that in Istanbul alone there was one honor killing every week, and reported over 1,000 during the previous five years. It added that metropolitan cities were the location of many of these, due to growing immigration to these cities from the East.

In 2009, a Turkish news agency reported that a 2-day-old boy who was born out of wedlock had been killed for honor. The maternal grandmother of the infant, along with six other persons, including a doctor who had reportedly accepted a bribe to not report the birth, were arrested. The grandmother is suspected of fatally suffocating the infant. The child's mother, 25, was also arrested; she stated that her family had made the decision to kill the child.

In 2010, a 16-year-old Kurdish girl was buried alive by relatives for befriending boys in Southeast Turkey; her corpse was found 40 days after she went missing. Ahmet Yildiz, 26, a Turkish-Kurdish physics student who represented his country at an international gay conference in the United States in 2008, was shot dead leaving a cafe in Istanbul. It is believed Yildiz was the victim of the country's first gay honor killing.

In Turkey, persons found guilty of this crime are sentenced to life in prison. There are well documented cases in which Turkish courts have sentenced whole families to life imprisonment for an honor killing. On January 13, 2009, a Turkish Court sentenced five members of the same Kurdish family to life imprisonment for the honor killing of Naile Erdas, 16, who became pregnant as a result of rape.

=== Rape ===
In 2015, Turkish university student Özgecan Aslan was murdered as she resisted a rape attempt on a minibus in Mersin. Her burnt body was discovered on 13 February. The murder was committed by Turkish minibus driver Ahmet Suphi Altındöken, his father Necmettin Altındöken and his friend Fatih Gökçe. According to Turkish Daily Sabah, Özgecan Aslan became a symbol for Turkish women who are the victims of violence.

In 2013, The Guardian reported that 'the rape and torture of Kurdish prisoners in Turkey are disturbingly commonplace'. According to a report from Amnesty International in 2003, Hamdiye Aslan, who accused of supporting the Kurdish separatist group had been detained in Mardin Prison, south-east Turkey, for almost three months in which she was reportedly blindfolded, anally raped with a truncheon, threatened and mocked by officers.

Cases of rape crimes on foreign female tourists by local men have also been reported, although the exact number is unknown as only the instances on an individual basis have been reported.

=== Insulting Turkey and Turkishness ===
- Article 299 of the Turkish Penal Code makes it a criminal offence to insult the President of Turkey.
- Article 301 of the Turkish Penal Code makes it a criminal offence to insult Turkey, the Turkish nation, Turkish government institutions, or Turkish national heroes.

=== Inciting hatred ===
- Article 312 of the Turkish Penal Code makes it a criminal offence to incite racial or religious hatred by encouraging people to commit a criminal offence.

=== Gang activity ===
Over the last ten years,24391 people have been detained by the police and of those 8602 arrested in 2012 operations against gangs. The gendermarie has likewise detained 10437 people, arrested 6269 in 771 operations. Approximately a third of these arrests took place in 2005–7.

=== Guns ===
The Hope Foundation estimated in 2025 that 2.5 million civilians had licensed guns, but that there were over 25 million illegal guns.

The Crime Incident Database for Turkey documented 1,517 armed assaults resulting in death or injury in the press in 2025, of which 1,151 were committed with a firearm and 366 with a knife or other sharp instrument. Of these assaults, 830 were fatal.

== Violence by authorities ==
=== Torture ===
Since the 1980s this issue has been the subject of studies by Amnesty International, Human Rights Watch and the European Committee for the Prevention of Torture, who in 2004 reported "The legislative and regulatory framework necessary to combat effectively torture and other forms of ill-treatment by law enforcement officials has been put in place; the challenge now is to make sure that all of the provisions concerned are given full effect in practice." and Prime Minister Tayyip Erdoğan has declared that there will be "zero tolerance" of torture in Turkey.

=== Deaths in custody ===
There have been a number of rulings against Turkey in the European Court of Human Rights resulting from deaths in custody in the 1990s, a period when this was raised as an issue by Amnesty International, Human Rights Watch and others.

In an August 2007 incident, Nigerian footballer Festus Okey was shot by the police while being detained in Beyoğlu police station. According to the police he had tried to wrestle the gun from the officer and was shot in the ensuing struggle. The Interior Minister Beşir Atalay refused to make a statement, saying "Questions are asked everywhere, they don't all get a reply".

== See also ==
- Law enforcement in Turkey
- Human rights in Turkey
- Corruption in Turkey
- Turkish mafia
- The Daltonlar
