= The Conjuring (soundtrack) =

The Conjuring (Original Motion Picture Soundtrack)

Film score by Joseph Bishara
- Released: July 16, 2013
- Studios: Eastwood Scoring Stage, Warner Bros., Burbank; Signature Sound Studios, San Diego; Capitol Studios, Hollywood, Los Angeles
- Genre: Film score
- Length: 46:44
- Labels: La-La Land Records; WaterTower Music
- Producer: Joseph Bishara

Joseph Bishara chronology
Dark Skies (2013)	The Conjuring (2013)	Insidious: Chapter 2 (2013)

The Conjuring (Original Motion Picture Soundtrack) is the score album to the 2013 film The Conjuring directed by James Wan. The film score is composed by Joseph Bishara, whom he had previously collaborated with Wan on Insidious (2011). The score was recorded at the Warner Bros. Eastwood Scoring Stage in Warner Bros., Burbank, Signature Sound Studios, San Diego and Capitol Studios, Los Angeles. La-La Land Records and WaterTower Music released the soundtrack on July 16, 2013.

== Development ==
James Wan asked on Bishara's involvement even before the film began production and the studio and producers were supportive of his decision to recruit the crew members he worked on Insidious. The soundtrack consisted of a larger palette with the scoring process taking a longer time with more people being involved. He started working on the score along with Insidious, so that he could explore and develop the sonic palette with the heightened focus on the details of the film. He also visited the sets during production so that he could connect with the characters and the aspects of their stories involved. He also met Lorraine Warren (her character was not credited in the film) during the sets, where he went to her home and the museum of haunted artifacts in the basement.

As an early response to the material, he collected some of the brass clustered sounds which provided a "quiet shimmering flutter tonge [sic?] effect" and it became the primary sound for the film. Avant-garde musician Diamanda Galás contributed to the score; she performed raw vocal improvisation on top of the previously recorded brass instrumentation at Capitol Studios. Much of the score followed the brass motions and as she heard some of the material, she decided to layer her multi-tracked vocals to improvise the brass recordings and then takes the shape from there. Composer Mark Isham also performed one of the themes entitled "Family Theme".

== Track listing ==
No.	Title	Length
1.	"The Conjuring"	1:01
2.	"Dead Birds"	0:35
3.	"Clap Game"	5:23
4.	"Witch Perch"	2:32
5.	"Maurice"	0:59
6.	"Touring Haunted Planes"	1:37
7.	"Taped Occurrences"	2:00
8.	"Black Bile"	1:04
9.	"She Saw Something"	1:10
10.	"Look What She Made Me Do"	0:35
11.	"Sleepwalker"	1:34
12.	"Wall Searching"	0:28
13.	"Hanging Drop"	2:14
14.	"Water Corpse Vision"	1:44
15.	"You Look Very Pretty"	1:49
16.	"Souls Pulled In"	1:43
17.	"Witch Comes Through"	1:29
18.	"Birds Pulled In"	1:15
19.	"Murderous Offering"	0:58
20.	"The Soaring Entities"	3:15
21.	"Ritual Casting"	3:25
22.	"Cellar Tone"	0:59
23.	"Annabelle"	3:32
24.	"Doll Box"	0:48
25.	"Family Theme" (Mark Isham)	4:35
Total length:		46:44

== Reception ==
Justin Chang of Variety commented that, "composer Joseph Bishara supplies another deranged symphony of screeching strings, working in nerve-shredding counterpoint to the film’s inventive soundscape of bumps, creaks, whispers and pauses." Tim Grierson of Screen International wrote, "composer Joseph Bishara has fashioned an elegant, restrained score that rarely oversells the shocks, preferring a quietly insistent mood of slithering unease to produce its desired effects." Sheri Linden of The Hollywood Reporter commented that, "the churn and squall" of Bishara's score heightens the mood. Kanika Johri of Hindustan Times wrote, "the film is effective primarily due to its sudden sound transitions combined with the A-tonal music, kudos to Joseph Bishara and Mark Crozer for that."

Music critic Jonathan Broxton of Movie Music UK gave a negative review, summarizing, "The Conjuring is a vacuum, with an almost total lack of any sort of thematic presence, melody, harmony, or emotional connection besides the pervading sense of fear."

== Personnel ==
Credits adapted from CD liner notes.

- Composer – Joseph Bishara
- Producer – Joseph Bishara, MV Gerhard
- Recording – Tom Hardisty, Chris Spilfogel, Charlie Paakkari
- Mixing – Chris Spilfogel
- Mixing assistance – Fernando Morales Franchini
- Mastering – Dave Collins
- Music editor – Lisé Richardson
- Music co-ordinator – Kim Baum
- Music preparation – Eric Stonerook Music
- Technical engineer (Warner Bros. Eastwood Scoring Stage) – Ryan Robinson
- Technical engineer (Capitol Studios) – Charlie Paakkari
- Stage manager (Warner Bros. Eastwood Scoring Stage) – Jamie Olvera
- Stage manager (Capitol Studios) – Paula Salvatore
- Stage crew (Warner Bros. Eastwood Scoring Stage) – Richard Wheeler Jr.
- Art direction – Dan Goldwasser
- Musical assistance – Alisa Burket
- Scoring assistance – Lauren Aghajanian

Instruments

- Bass – Edward Meares, Michael Valerio, Nico Abondolo
- Bassoon – Kenneth Munday, Rose Corrigan
- Cello – Andrew Shulman, Armen Ksajikian, David Speltz, Dennis Marmazyn, Paula Hochhalter, Richard Dodd, Steve Erdody
- Clarinet – Phil O'Connor, Ralph Williams, Stuart Clark
- Flute – Geraldine Rotella, Sara Andon
- French horn – Daniel Kelley, Danielle Ondarza, David Everson, Mark Adams, Steven Becknell
- Harp – JoAnn Turovsky
- Oboe – Chris Bleth, Leslie Reed
- Piano – Vicki Ray
- Trombone – Alexander Illes, William Reichenbach, Larry Andrews, William Booth
- Trumpet – Daniel Rosenbloom, Jon Lewis
- Tuba – Doug Tornquist, William Roper
- Viola – Andrew Duckles, Brian Dembow, David Walther, Lauren Chipman, Matthew Funes, Shawn Mann, Victoria Miskolczy
- Violin – Bruce Dukov, Dimitrie Leivici, Elizabeth Chorley, Eric Gorfain, Eun-Mee Ahn, Helen Nightengale, Jay Rosen, Jessica Guideri, Julie Gigante, Katia Popov, Lisa Sutton, Maya Magub, Natalie Leggett, Phillip Levy, Roger Wilkie, Serena McKinney, Shalini Vijayan, Songa Lee, Tamara Hatwan, Tereza Stanislav
- Additional vocals – Alisa Burket
- Featuring vocals – Diamanda Galás

Orchestra and choir

- Choir – Ayana Haviv, Cindy O'Connor, Claire Fedoruk, Elissa Johnston, Elyse Marchant Willis, Hayden Eberhart, Jessica Rotter, Karen Hogle Brown, Suzanne Waters
- Orchestra conductor – Jeffrey Holmes
- Orchestra contractor – Peter Rotter
- Choir conductor and contractor – Jasper Randall
- Orchestration – Dana Niu
- Concertmaster – Daphne Chen, Sid Page

Management

- Music business and legal affairs – Lisa Margolis
- Executive in charge of music (New Line Cinema) – Erin Scully
- Executive in charge of soundtracks (WaterTower Music) – Jason Linn
- Executive producer (La-La Land Records) – Matt Verboys
- Product manager (WaterTower Music) – Sandeep Sriram
