= Turka, Republic of Buryatia =

Turka Турка
- Selo
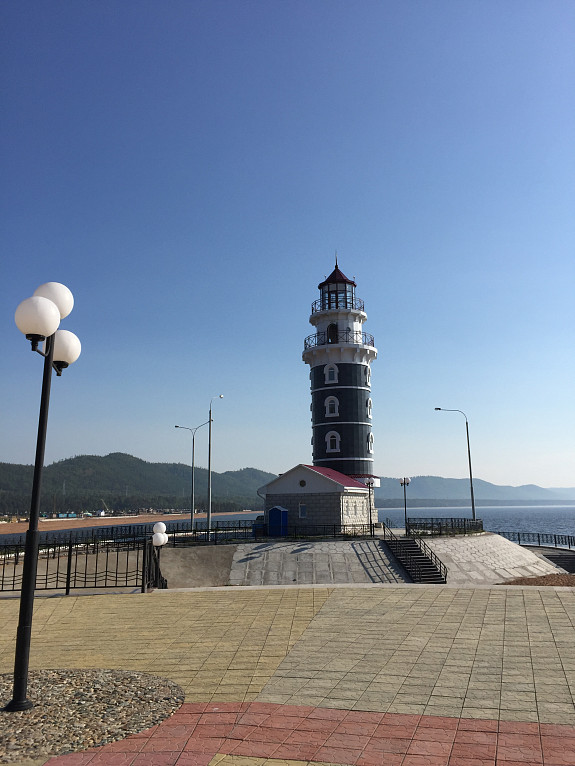
- Lighthouse at Turka village

- Location within Republic of Buryatia Location within Russia
- Coordinates: 52°56′N 108°13′E
- Country: Russia
- Region: Republic of Buryatia
- District: Pribaykalsky District
- Time zone: UTC+8:00

Turka (Russian: Турка; Buryat: Түрхэнэ, Türkhene) is a rural locality (a selo) in Pribaykalsky District, Republic of Buryatia, Russia. The population was 1,450 as of 2010. There are 19 streets.

== Geography ==
Turka is located on the eastern shore of Lake Baikal, by the mouth of the Turka River, 9 km (5.6 mi) north of Lake Kotokel and 113 km (70 mi) north of Turuntayevo (the district's administrative centre) by road. Goryachinsk is the nearest rural locality.
