= Burdukovo, Pribaykalsky District, Republic of Buryatia =

Burdukovo Бурдуково
- Selo
- Location within Republic of Buryatia Location within Russia
- Coordinates: 52°05′N 107°30′E
- Country: Russia
- Region: Republic of Buryatia
- District: Pribaykalsky District
- Time zone: UTC+8:00

Burdukovo (Russian: Бурдуково) is a rural locality (a selo) in Pribaykalsky District, Republic of Buryatia, Russia. The population was 50 as of 2010. There are 3 streets.

== Geography ==
Burdukovo is located 25 km southwest of Turuntayevo (the district's administrative centre) by road. Staroye Tataurovo is the nearest rural locality.
