= Falęcin =

Falęcin may refer to the following places:

- Falęcin, Kuyavian-Pomeranian Voivodeship (north-central Poland)
- Falęcin, Grójec County in Masovian Voivodeship (east-central Poland)
- Falęcin, Płock County in Masovian Voivodeship (east-central Poland)
- Falęcin, Pruszków County in Masovian Voivodeship (east-central Poland)
