= Dębie =

Dębie may refer to the following places:

- Dębie, Masovian Voivodeship, east-central Poland
- Dębie, Opole Voivodeship, south-west Poland
- Dębie, Silesian Voivodeship, south Poland
