= Turau (surname) =

Turau (feminine-language: Turava) is a Belarusian-language surname. It may also be transliterated from Belarusian as Turaŭ or Turaw.

The surname may refer to:

- Turov (surname), Russian-language form; may be used interchangeably with the Belarusian form for Belarusian persons
- Ryta Turava, Belarusian athlete, competing in race walking
- Alesia Turava, Belarusian athlete, middle-distance runner

== See also ==
- Turow (disambiguation)
