= Lesznowola, Grójec County =

Lesznowola
- Village
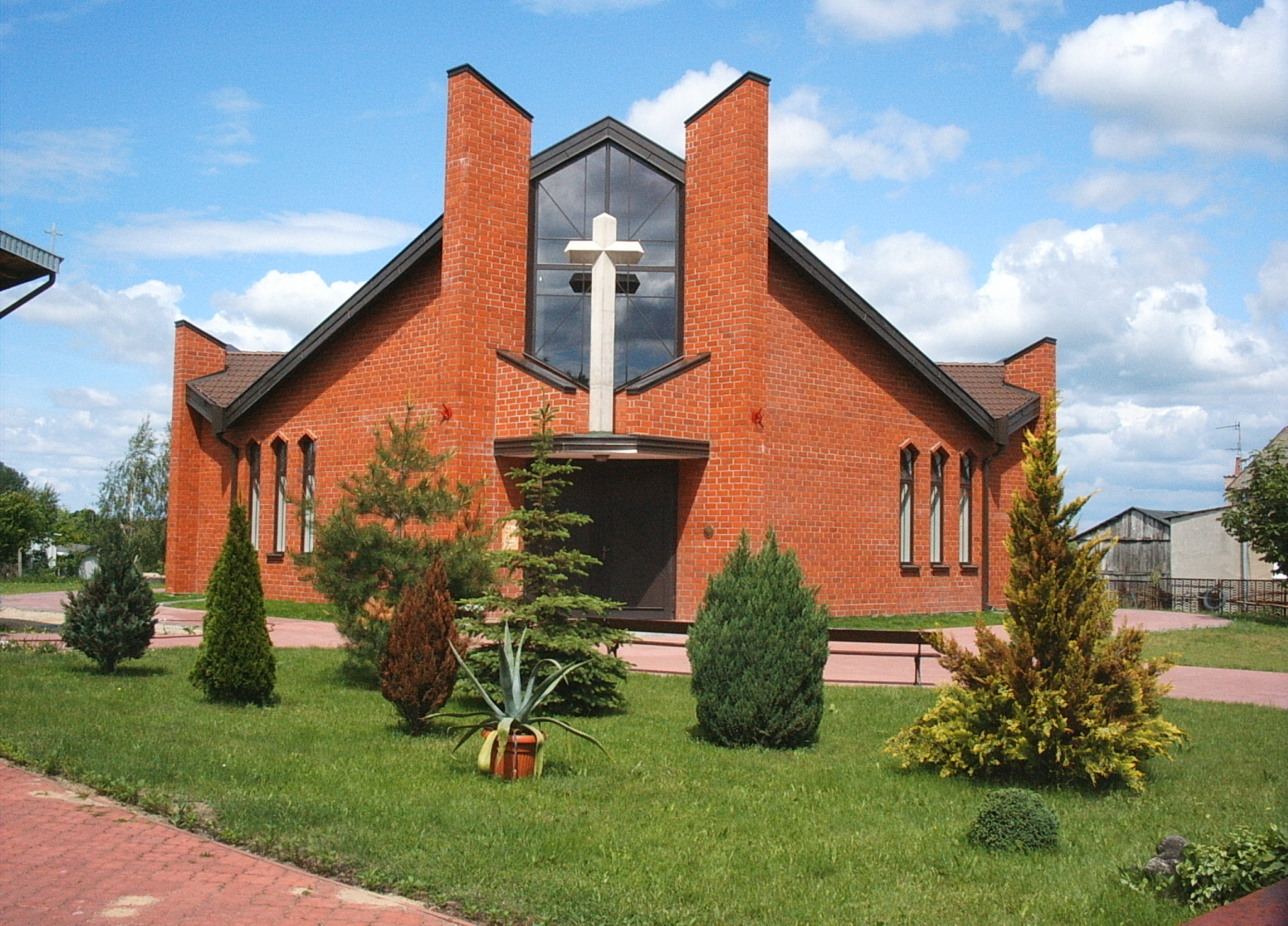

- Location within Poland
- Coordinates: 51°54′49″N 20°54′1″E
- Country: Poland
- Voivodeship: Masovian
- County: Grójec
- Gmina: Grójec
- Population (approx.): 750

Lesznowola [lɛʂnɔˈvɔla] is a village in the administrative district of Gmina Grójec, within Grójec County, Masovian Voivodeship, in east-central Poland. It lies approximately 5 km (3 mi) north-east of Grójec and 15 km (9 mi)
