= Częstoniew =

- Village
- Location within Poland
- Coordinates: 51°52′N 20°58′E
- Country: Poland
- Voivodeship: Masovian
- County: Grójec
- Gmina: Grójec

Częstoniew [t͡ʂɛ̃sˈtɔɲɛf] is a village in the administrative district of Gmina Grójec, within Grójec County, Masovian Voivodeship, in east-central Poland.
