= Chto Delat? (art collective) =

Russian art collective

Chto Delat (What Is to Be Done?)
- Born: Founded in 2003; Saint Petersburg, Russia
- Occupation: Art collective

Chto Delat?, now known as Chto Delat (without the question mark), is a collective of artists, critics, philosophers and writers. Its name refers to Nikolai Chernyshevsky's novel Chto Delat'? (Russian: Что делать?, lit. What to Do?, English: What Is to Be Done?, 1863) and Vladimir Lenin's pamphlet of the same title (1902).

The collective was founded in 2003 in Saint Petersburg, Russia, where it is still currently based. There are nine core members, coming from Moscow, Nizhny Novgorod, and Saint Petersburg: Olga Egorova aka Tsaplya (artist), Nina Gasteva (choreographer), Artemy Magun (philosopher), Nikolay Oleynikov (artist), Alexei Penzin (philosopher), Natalia Pershina-Yakimanskaya aka Gluklya (artist), Aleksandr Skidan (poet and critic), Oxana Timofeeva (philosopher), and Dmitry Vilensky (artist).

== Work ==
Chto Delat promotes the integration and blending of art, activism, and political theory. The collective's activities include educating the public on the post-socialist condition and focusing on commemoration and educating of the lost or repressed past of the Soviet Union. Chto Delat's practice is at the crossroads of theatre, video, broadcasts, murals, installations, public campaigns and seminars.

== Exhibitions ==
The collective's artworks have been shown at Reina Sofia Museum, Madrid (2010 and 2014); Mudam, Luxembourg (2010 and 2011–2012); New Museum, New York (2011); MUAC, Mexico City (2012 and 2017); Kadist, San Francisco (2013); Secession, Vienna (2014–2015); Centre Pompidou, Paris (2017); Open Space of Experimental Art, Tbilisi (2019); and State of Concept, Athens (2020).

== Collections ==
- Centre Pompidou, Paris, France
- Museo Reina Sofia, Madrid, Spain
- The Museum of Modern Art (MoMA), New York, USA
