= Kociszew, Masovian Voivodeship =

Kociszew
- Village
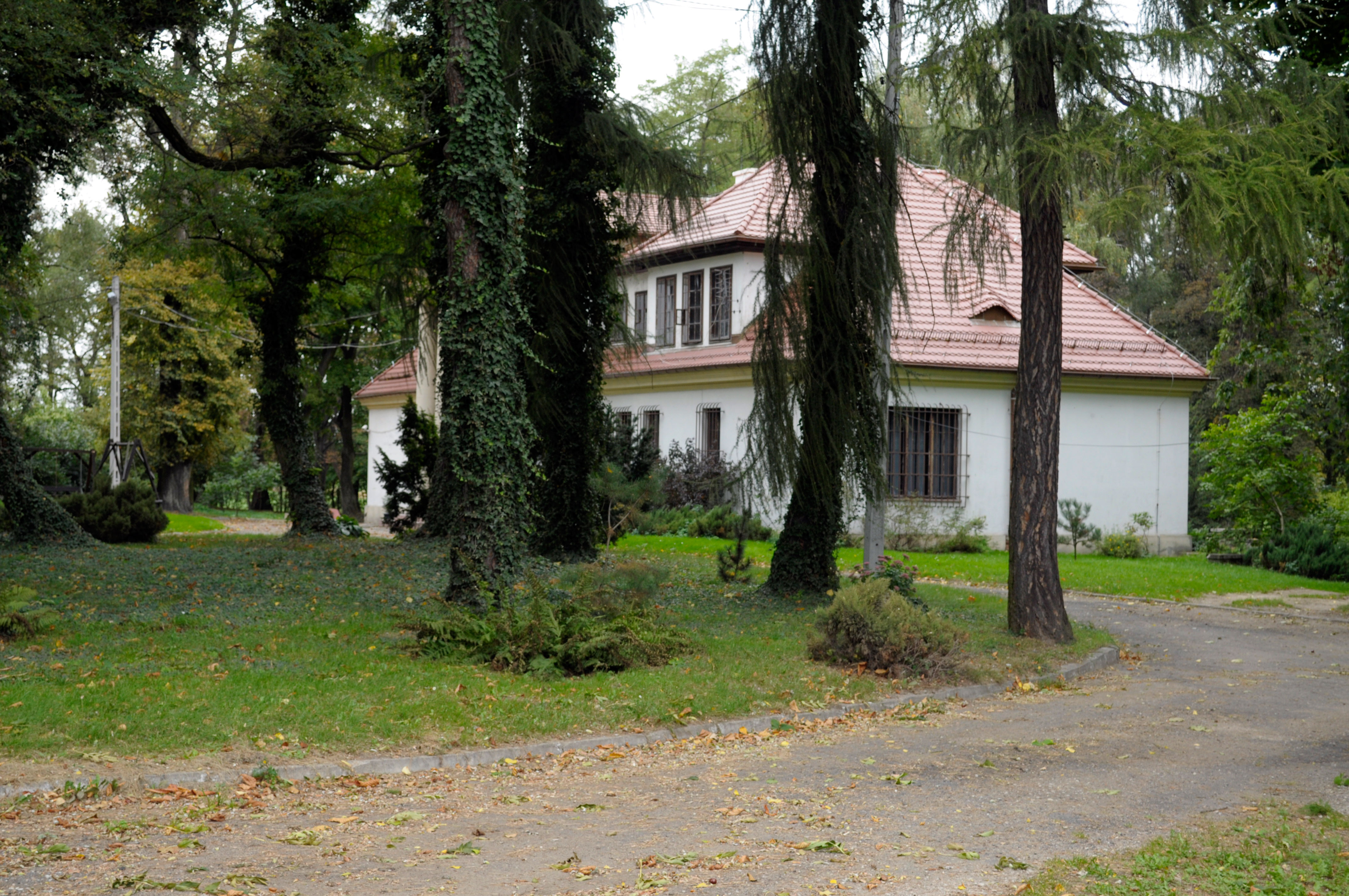
- Manor in Kociszew

- Location within Poland
- Coordinates: 51°51′25″N 20°55′12″E
- Country: Poland
- Voivodeship: Masovian
- County: Grójec
- Gmina: Grójec
- Time zone: UTC+1 (CET)
  - Summer (DST): UTC+2 (CEST)

Kociszew [kɔˈt͡ɕiʂɛf] is a village in the administrative district of Gmina Grójec, within Grójec County, Masovian Voivodeship, in east-central Poland.

Eight Polish citizens were murdered by Nazi Germany in the village during World War II.
