= Maciejowice, Grójec County =

Maciejowice
- Village
- Location within Poland
- Coordinates: 51°54′N 20°55′E
- Country: Poland
- Voivodeship: Masovian
- County: Grójec
- Gmina: Grójec

Maciejowice [mat͡ɕɛjɔˈvit͡sɛ] is a village in the administrative district of Gmina Grójec, within Grójec County, Masovian Voivodeship, in east-central Poland.
