= Marianów, Gmina Grójec =

Marianów
- Village
- Location within Poland
- Coordinates: 51°52′17″N 20°54′11″E
- Country: Poland
- Voivodeship: Masovian
- County: Grójec
- Gmina: Grójec

Marianów [maˈrjanuf] is a village in the administrative district of Gmina Grójec, within Grójec County, Masovian Voivodeship, in east-central Poland.
