= Grudzkowola =

- Village
- Location within Poland
- Coordinates: 51°51′N 20°52′E
- Country: Poland
- Voivodeship: Masovian
- County: Grójec
- Gmina: Grójec
- Time zone: UTC+1 (CET)
  - Summer (DST): UTC+2 (CEST)

Grudzkowola [ɡrut͡skɔˈvɔla] is a village in the administrative district of Gmina Grójec, within Grójec County, Masovian Voivodeship, in east-central Poland.

Six Polish citizens were murdered by Nazi Germany in the village during World War II.
