= Piekiełko, Masovian Voivodeship =

Piekiełko
- Village
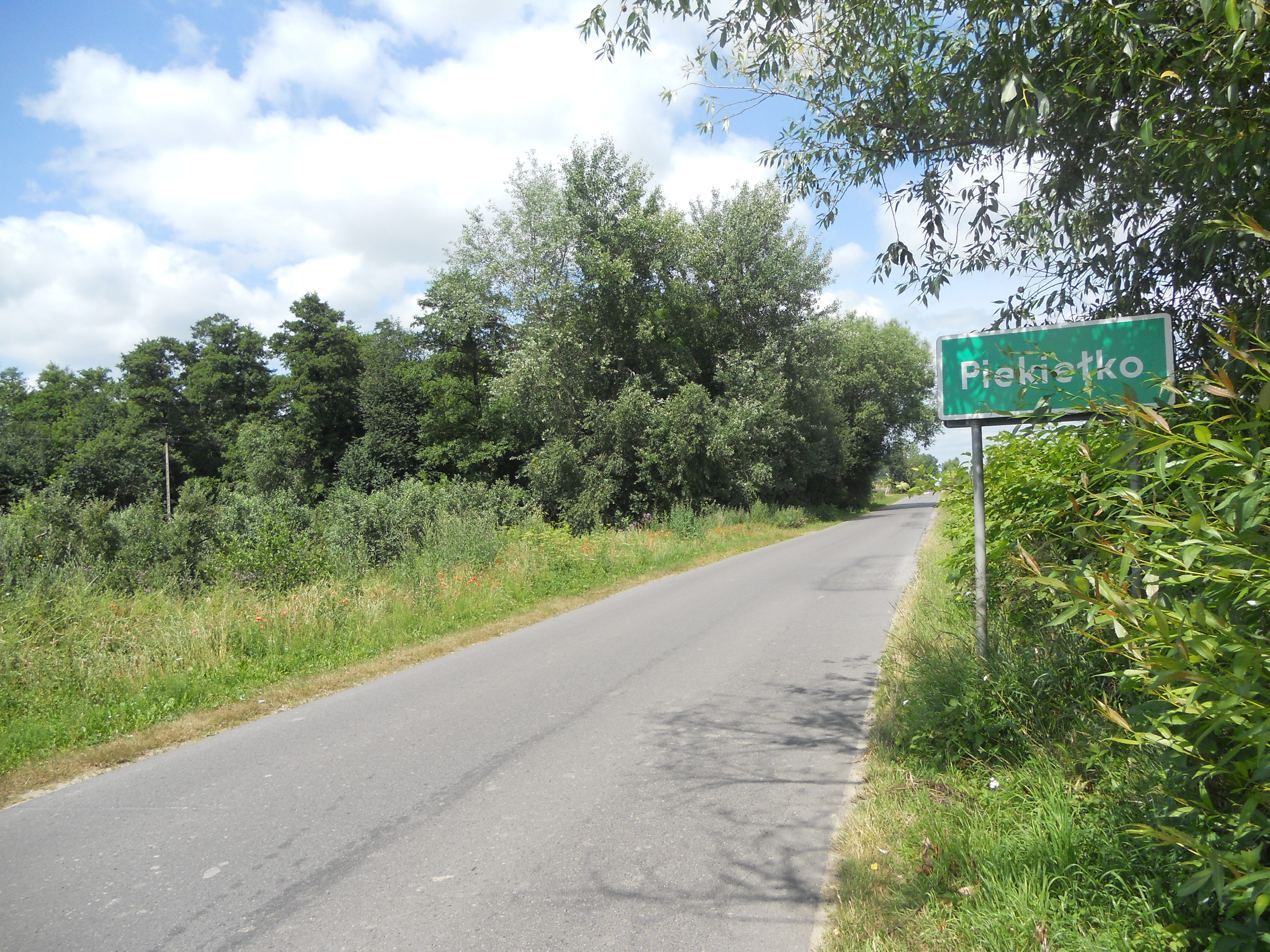
- Street and road sign of Piekiełko, Masovian Voivodeship

- Location within Poland
- Coordinates: 51°50′04″N 20°51′34″E
- Country: Poland
- Voivodeship: Masovian
- County: Grójec
- Gmina: Grójec

Piekiełko [pjɛˈkʲɛu̯kɔ] is a village in the administrative district of Gmina Grójec, within Grójec County, Masovian Voivodeship, in east-central Poland.
