= Zakrzewska Wola, Grójec County =

Zakrzewska Wola
- Village
- Location within Poland
- Coordinates: 51°54′03″N 20°54′18″E
- Country: Poland
- Voivodeship: Masovian
- County: Grójec
- Gmina: Grójec

Zakrzewska Wola [zaˈkʂɛfska ˈvɔla] is a village in the administrative district of Gmina Grójec, within Grójec County, Masovian Voivodeship, in east-central Poland.
