= Zalesie, Gmina Grójec =

Zalesie
- Village
- Location within Poland
- Coordinates: 51°53′24″N 20°49′41″E
- Country: Poland
- Voivodeship: Masovian
- County: Grójec
- Gmina: Grójec
- Postal code: 05-600

Zalesie [zaˈlɛɕɛ] is a village in the administrative district of Gmina Grójec, within Grójec County, Masovian Voivodeship, in east-central Poland.
