= Mięsy =

- Village
- Location within Poland
- Coordinates: 51°53′N 20°58′E
- Country: Poland
- Voivodeship: Masovian
- County: Grójec
- Gmina: Grójec

Mięsy [ˈmjɛ̃sɨ] is a village in the administrative district of Gmina Grójec, within Grójec County, Masovian Voivodeship, in east-central Poland.
