= Duży Dół =

- Village
- Location within Poland
- Coordinates: 51°55′N 20°53′E
- Country: Poland
- Voivodeship: Masovian
- County: Grójec
- Gmina: Grójec

Duży Dół (Polish pronunciation: [ˈduʐɨ ˈduw]) is a village in the administrative district of Gmina Grójec, within Grójec County, Masovian Voivodeship, in east-central Poland.
