= Podole, Masovian Voivodeship =

Podole
- Village
- Location within Poland
- Coordinates: 51°55′29″N 20°50′53″E
- Country: Poland
- Voivodeship: Masovian
- County: Grójec
- Gmina: Grójec

Podole [pɔˈdɔlɛ] is a village in the administrative district of Gmina Grójec, within Grójec County, Masovian Voivodeship, in east-central Poland.
