= Aleksandr Skidan =

Russian author (born 1965)

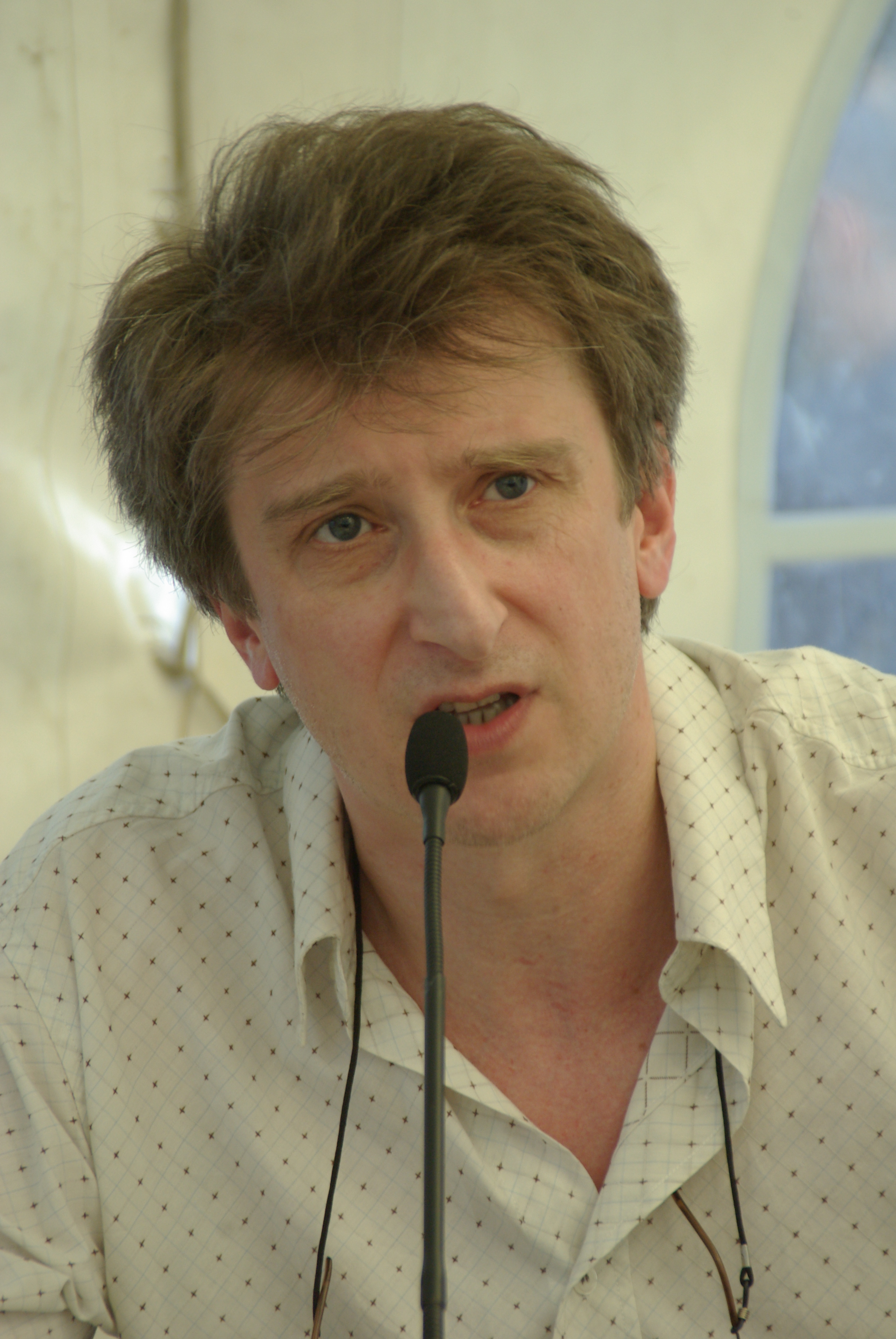

Aleksandr Vadimovich Skidan (Александр Вадимович Скидан, born December 29, 1965, in Leningrad, USSR) is an author of Russian poetry and a translator of both American poetry and American and European literary theory.Aleksandr Skidan is the subject of academic literary analysis addressing contemporary Russian experimental poetry.

== Life and education ==
Skidan currently resides in Saint Petersburg where he was born and raised. Several years prior to his career (1985–2002), Skidan worked in a gas boiler room, as an operator. Skidan attended the Free University (1989–1992). Skidan later chose to neglect Soviet higher education, in protest. Skidan has travelled a lot for his work and to collaborate with other artists. His current marital status is unknown.

== Overview of works ==
Skidan has written poems, essays, and novels. He explores subjects of postmodern Russian poetics. The subjects range from politics (ex. poem, "Kondratievsky Prospect", Red Shifting (2008) pg.65), sexual assault (ex. Travesty, Red Shifting (2008) pg. 3), and modern western influence ("Piercing of the Lower Lip", Red Shifting (2008) pg. 107). Among his many subjects, Skidan introduces themes of freedom, modernity, imagination, visualization, and metaphors to build the architecture of his writing. Skidan is a technical writer, who constantly revises his work. Skidan's work explores political and social aspects of life in post Soviet Russia. Skidan also explores themes of dialogue in some of his poems, which not only help the reader to visualize his poetry, but emphasize its hidden meaning.

Out of Skidan's work, five collections of poetry, four books of essays, in addition to one novel have been published in the Russian language, including:

- "Delirium" (1993)
- Critical Mass (1995) (collection of essays)
- "In the Re-Reading" (1998)
- The Resistance to/of Poetry (2001) (collection of essays)
- Red Shifting (2006) (collection of poetry)
- "Dissolution" (2010)
- Summation of a Poetics (2013) (collection of essays)
- Theses Toward Politicization of Art and Other Texts (2014) (collection of essays)
- "Membra disjecta" (2015)
- Guide to N (2018) (novel)
- Damp Words Chalk: About Arkadii Dragomoshchenko (2019) (collection of essays)
- Golem Soveticus: Prigov as Brecht and Warhol in One Persona. Translated into English by Kevin M. F. Platt. (Art, Criticism, Essay, and Poetics) (2020)

Skidan has had many publications in various magazines, such as Volga, Place of Press, Mitin Journal, Comments, October, Banner, New Russian Book, New Literary View, Russian Prose, and Critical Mass.

In addition Skidan has three published anthologies: very short texts, 24 poets and 2 commissars, and Anthology of Russian Verliber.

=== Red Shifting ===
Red Shifting is Skidan's collection of poems and written essays which raise the question: what lines are blurred between philosophy and literature, as well as modes of discourse. This work has been described as vigorously avant-garde and experimental, verbally disruptive, and intellectually anchoring all at once. This piece was published by ugly duckling press in January 2008, Translated by Genya Turovskaya.

Skidan's mentor, Arkadii Dragomoshchenko, describes Skidan's work Red Shifting as “[s]omnambulistic.” Dragomoshchenko also says " Indeed, Skidan creates dream-poems. What is at play in the dream-poem? Incest and GAS!".

The collection has been expressed in Skidan's critical writing and in his organizations with other writers, philosophers, and critics in part with Chto Delat. Such writers who are also known for having shifted their perspective to entertain to Marxism in the 2000s and 2010s.

=== Red Shifting reviews ===
"To read a book this fierce, this honest, to disappear into these beautiful, wrecked songs—and to disappear 'more fully' precisely because they question 'the idea of the wrecked song'—is a singular, moving experience. The poems in Red Shifting, translated beautifully by Genya Turovskaya, display a near-physical, wounding intelligence, an intelligence unflinchingly aware of what it means to think history's recklessness."- Christian Hawkey

"The quote mosaic in Skidan’s poems is a temptation for the sophisticated reader. The temptation to find your own unique subjectivity in the zone of its fundamental impossibility, in the zone of unconditional triumph of impersonal foreign speech, gleaned from a high cultural archive or from a low household vocabulary ... Moreover, the collage principle of writing practiced by him excludes the presence of an authorial lyrical voice. That is why the inevitable explosive effect arises, caused by the uncertainty and decay of the subject of the utterance."- Dmitry Golynko-Wolfson

"Alexander Skidan is a unique phenomenon for modern Russian literature. It combines the rationality of a subtle analyst and an impartial critic with an exquisite poetic instinct. After the Silver Age (Andrei Bely, Vyach. Ivanov, Osip Mandelstam), the combination of theorist and poet in one person almost disappeared from Russian literature. Skidan has a line between the world of criticism, mental play and the world of poetry, which does not allow a direct invasion of the analytic concept into poetry. But determining where this line passes is not easy". - Mikhail Yampolsky

== Translation ==
Skidan has much experience translating many contemporary poems into the Russian language, from a diverse crowd of writers and philosophers. Philosophers such as Paolo Virno (Italian philosopher), and Gerald Raunig (Swiss philosopher and theorist), and Jean-Luc Nancy (French philosopher), Slavoj Žižek (Slovenian philosopher), Antonio Negri (Italian philosopher). Including American writers such as, Paul de Man, J. Hillis Miller, Charles Olson, Michael Palmer, Paul Bowles, Susan Howe, Eileen Myles, Rosmarie Waldrop (German-American).

Skidan contributed to the translation of authors like, Paul Bowles, Malcolm Jones, and Gertrude Stein's "The World is Round" (unpublished), poems being translated into English, French, Italian, Swedish, Finnish, Estonian, Lithuanian, and Hebrew.

== Editing ==
Skidan works as a co-editor of the magazine New Literary Observer. Skidan is also an advisory board member of " Translit", a literary/critical anthology, publishing and group of artists, including philosophers, poets, and humanities scholars. The leaders and editors attempt to have the Translit act as a light source for the various fields of controversy and confrontation in literature.

== Art collective ==
Skidan is an active member of Chto Delat (What Is to Be Done?), a collective of artists, critics, philosophers and writers based in Saint Petersburg.

== Awards ==
Skidan was given the (1997) Zarskoselskii Literary Award, he was also awarded the 1998 award for short prose, Turgenev Award. Skidan also won the Andrey Bely prize for poetry, for his work titled, Red Shifting (2006). In addition Skidan accepted the 2006 Bridge Award, for "best critical text". Lastly, Skidan also was given the Joseph Brodsky Memorial Fellowship award for poetry in 2018.

== Quotes ==
" It is art that by means of the caesura, defamiliarization, self-reflection, fragmentariness, and the decomposition of narrative allows one to discover the asemantic gaps, the folds in meaning that have not yet been colonized by ideology. This is art that inserts spectators and readers into the process of co-authorship, of becoming, and in this way leads them to an understanding of their ties with the bodies and consciousnesses of others". - Aleksandr Skidan

The following quotations are from a 2014 interview, Skidan did with RUNYWeb, and give an in-depth insight into his feelings on his works and involvement in social organizations:

- “ Each author dictates his own rules, his own law”- Aleksandr Skidan
- "Poetry is the ability to plunge into a dream at the right time, to surrender to obsession. And in time to get out of it. It is also a kind of discipline, but of a different order, subject to a different logic." - Aleksandr Skidan
- " The first tradition, the tradition of double-checking rules, doubts, deconstruction, is close to me. Everything should be called into question, including the critical position itself. As Nietzsche said: “In every philosophy there is a point when the convictions of the philosopher appear on the scene.” The same can be said of the artist, and of the poet, and of criticism." - Aleksandr Skidan
- "I see a perspective in hybridization, the crossing of various discursive modes and types of writing, sometimes historically alien to each other, even hostile. It is not only a synthesis of prose and poetry, but also a synthesis of poetry and, for example, theory, poetry and practices of contemporary art. My “Red Shift” (2006) was partly a step in that direction. Another field of opportunity is combinatorial poetry, the use of various kinds of formal restrictions, aleatorics, cutting methods, computer algorithms, etc. I am interested in these technologies, again, not by themselves, but in the projection of the actual existential, political experience (the political experience is existential today); and as a first approximation, of course, as an effective antidote to the cultural logic prescribed by classical prosody, its inertia. Within the framework of the conventional metric verse, the poetic technique can be virtuoso, very diverse and rich in meanings, but these meanings do not go beyond what can be called the Russian cultural matrix, or code, they parasitize on it. This is an eternal archaic, rapturous transfusion of other people's dreams from glass to glass." - Aleksandr Skidan " The experience of meeting with another, including another type of art, is invaluable, even if the result turned out to be a failure, because it fluctuates the usual premises, shifts the angle of view, and reconfigures optics. " - Aleksandr Skidan
