= Annabelle (soundtrack) =

Annabelle (Original Motion Picture Soundtrack)

Film score by Joseph Bishara
- Released: September 30, 2014
- Recorded: Sony Scoring Stage, Culver City; Sunset Sound Recorders, Hollywood
- Genre: Film score
- Length: 51:02
- Label: WaterTower Music
- Producer: Joseph Bishara

Joseph Bishara chronology
Insidious: Chapter 2 (2013)	Annabelle (2014)	V/H/S: Viral (2014)

Annabelle (Original Motion Picture Soundtrack) is the soundtrack to the 2014 supernatural horror film Annabelle, a prequel to the 2013 film The Conjuring and the second installment in The Conjuring Universe franchise.

== Background ==
Joseph Bishara returned from the predecessor to contribute music for the film, which was recorded at the Sony Scoring Stage in Sony Pictures Studios, Culver City, California and Sunset Sound Recorders in Hollywood, Los Angeles. The soundtrack was released by WaterTower Music on September 30, 2014.

== Track listing ==
No.	Title	Length
1.	"Annabelle Opening"	2:18
2.	"Found at Prayer"	1:01
3.	"It's the One"	1:24
4.	"Not My Blood"	3:58
5.	"Cult Killings"	0:40
6.	"Return Home"	1:15
7.	"Promise Me"	0:55
8.	"Doll Disposal"	0:35
9.	"Broken Needle"	2:23
10.	"Doll is Back"	1:34
11.	"Shaken Foundations"	1:23
12.	"Black Stroller"	2:38
13.	"Disciples of the Ram"	2:42
14.	"They Summon"	2:28
15.	"The Devil Preys"	1:32
16.	"Demon Doll Rises"	3:04
17.	"No Chance"	1:40
18.	"Devil Ram"	1:42
19.	"What do You Want from Me"	2:00
20.	"Her Soul"	3:33
21.	"The Fallen"	1:59
22.	"Evil is Constant"	1:36
23.	"Annabelle Closing"	0:57
24.	"Annabelle Soaring"	1:53
25.	"The New Changes"	2:24
26.	"New Beginnings"	3:28
Total length:		51:02

== Reception ==
Scott Foundas of Variety called that Bishara's score is "still doing basso profundo backflips even as the end credits are rolling". Peter Hartlaub of SFGate wrote: "The score by Joseph Bishara also shows early Hitchcock influences." Drew Taylor of IndieWire called it as a "screeching score" that had a separate personality.

== Personnel ==
Credits adapted from CD liner notes:

- Music composer and producer – Joseph Bishara
- Recording – Fernando Morales Franchini, Chris Spilfogel
- Mixing – Chris Spilfogel
- Mastering – Dave Collins
- Music editor – Julie Pearce, Skye Lewin
- Music co-ordinator – Alisa Burket
- Soundtrack co-ordinator – Kim Baum
- Copyist – Eric Stonerook
- Art Direction – Sandeep Sriram

Instruments

- Bass – Bart Samolis, David Parmeter, Drew Dembowski, Edward Meares, Stephen Dress, Michael Valerio
- Cello – Dennis Karmazyn, George Kim Scholes, Paula Hochhalter, Steve Erdody, Trevor Handy, Vanessa Freebairn-Smith, Xiaodan Zheng, Richard Dodd
- Organ – Aaron Embry
- Piano – Vicki Ray
- Viola – Aaron Oltman, Alma Fernandez, Brian Dembow, David Walther, Laura Pearson, Luke Maurer, Matthew Funes, Pamela Jacobson, Robert Brophy, Shawn Mann, Lauren Chipman
- Violin – Andrew Bulbrook, Benjamin Jacobson, Charlie Bisharat, Darius Campo, Elizabeth Chorley, Erik Arvinder, Helen Nightengale, Irina Voloshina, Jay Rosen, Jessica Guideri, Josefina Vergara, Mary Sloan, Katia Popov, Lisa Sutton, Marisa Kuney, Natalie Leggett, Neil Samples, Phillip Levy, Rafael Rishik, Sarah Thornblade, Mc Kinney Serena, Bruce Dukov, Eric Gorfain

Orchestra

- Orchestration – Dana Niu
- Orchestra conductor – Joseph Bishara
- Orchestra contractor – Peter Rotter
- Concertmaster – Daphne Chen

Management

- Music business affairs – Dirk Hebert
- Executive in charge of music (New Line Cinema) – Erin Scully
- Executive in charge of soundtracks (WaterTower Music) – Jason Linn
