= Insidious: Chapter 2 (soundtrack) =

Film score by Joseph Bishara
- Released: September 15, 2013
- Recorded: 2013
- Genre: Film score
- Length: 43:00
- Label: Void Recordings
- Producer: Joseph Bishara

Joseph Bishara chronology
The Conjuring (2013)	Insidious: Chapter 2 (2013)	Annabelle (2014)

Insidious: Chapter 2 is the film score album to the 2013 film of the same name directed by James Wan; a sequel to Insidious (2010) and the second instalment in the Insidious film series. The film's score is composed by Joseph Bishara and released through Void Recordings on September 15, 2013.

== Background ==
In November 2012, James Wan announced that Joseph Bishara would score music for the film; Bishara, who had been Wan's regular collaborator, previously scored for the predecessor. Bishara felt important to find the right range and tone for the film, to generate tension through sound. Like the predecessor, Bishara assembled a string quartet to write the score but developed numerous ideas to the film score, which had a warped edge in contrast to the classical feel that emulated in the first film. Wan was instrumental on the placement of string music with Kirk Morri, the film's editor, who added "Silence can create a listening space, where rather than give you something else to listen to it enables you to hear things." The soundtrack was released digitally on September 15, 2013, and through physical formats on October 8, through Void Recordings, Bishara's own label.

== Critical reception ==
Michael Gingold of Fangoria admitted that the film was elevated with "the application of composer Joseph Bishara's string-heavy musical stingers." Scott Foundas of Variety and Justin Lowe of The Hollywood Reporter described it as "haunting" and "eerie". A review from The Denver Post wrote "Joseph Bishara's piano-heavy score is appropriately menacing and ties into the plot in a subtle but meaningful way." Kat Hughes of The Hollywood News wrote "As before it's the unnatural sounding score that will take you by surprise and you may find yourself out of your seat once or twice."

== Track listing ==
No.	Title	Length
1.	"Ghost Photographs"	1:02
2.	"Inside Your Dream"	1:18
3.	"The Flickering Entity"	1:46
4.	"Insidious Chapter 2"	3:22
5.	"You Think I Did This"	0:45
6.	"New Home"	0:44
7.	"Empty Crib"	0:31
8.	"Empty Home"	0:50
9.	"Had A Bad Dream"	1:23
10.	"Who Behind Eyes"	2:01
11.	"Don't You Dare"	2:09
12.	"Are You Here"	2:41
13.	"Only Ghosts Left"	1:36
14.	"This Is My Room"	1:33
15.	"To Live Again"	1:23
16.	"Mater Mortis"	1:07
17.	"Putrid Chamber"	3:24
18.	"Further Striking"	1:14
19.	"Feel Real Pain"	2:01
20.	"One Of The Dead"	2:24
21.	"The Mother"	1:26
22.	"Good Little Girl"	1:06
23.	"Closing Further"	2:17
24.	"Time To Forget"	1:15
25.	"New Haunting"	1:14
26.	"Void Figure 7"	2:28
Total length:		43:00

== Personnel ==
Credits adapted from liner notes

- Music – Joseph Bishara
- Engineer – Fernando Morales Franchini
- Recording and mixing – Chris Spilfogel
- Mastered By – Dave Collins
- Musical assistance – Alisa Burket

Instruments

- Cello – Richard Dodd
- Piano – Saar Hendelman
- Strings – The Section Quartet
- Viola – Lauren Chipman
- Violin – Daphne Chen, Eric Gorfain
- Vocals – Alisa Burket

== Additional music ==
Additional songs featured in the film include:

- "Waiting For You" by Alan Ett
- "Piano Sonata in B-flat Minor, Op. 35, 3rd movement" by Frédéric Chopin
