= Słomczyn, Grójec County =

Słomczyn
- Village
- Location within Poland
- Coordinates: 51°53′N 20°57′E
- Country: Poland
- Voivodeship: Masovian
- County: Grójec
- Gmina: Grójec

Słomczyn [ˈswɔmt͡ʂɨn] is a village in the administrative district of Gmina Grójec, in Grójec County, Masovian Voivodeship, in east-central Poland.
