= Mirowice, Masovian Voivodeship =

Mirowice
- Village
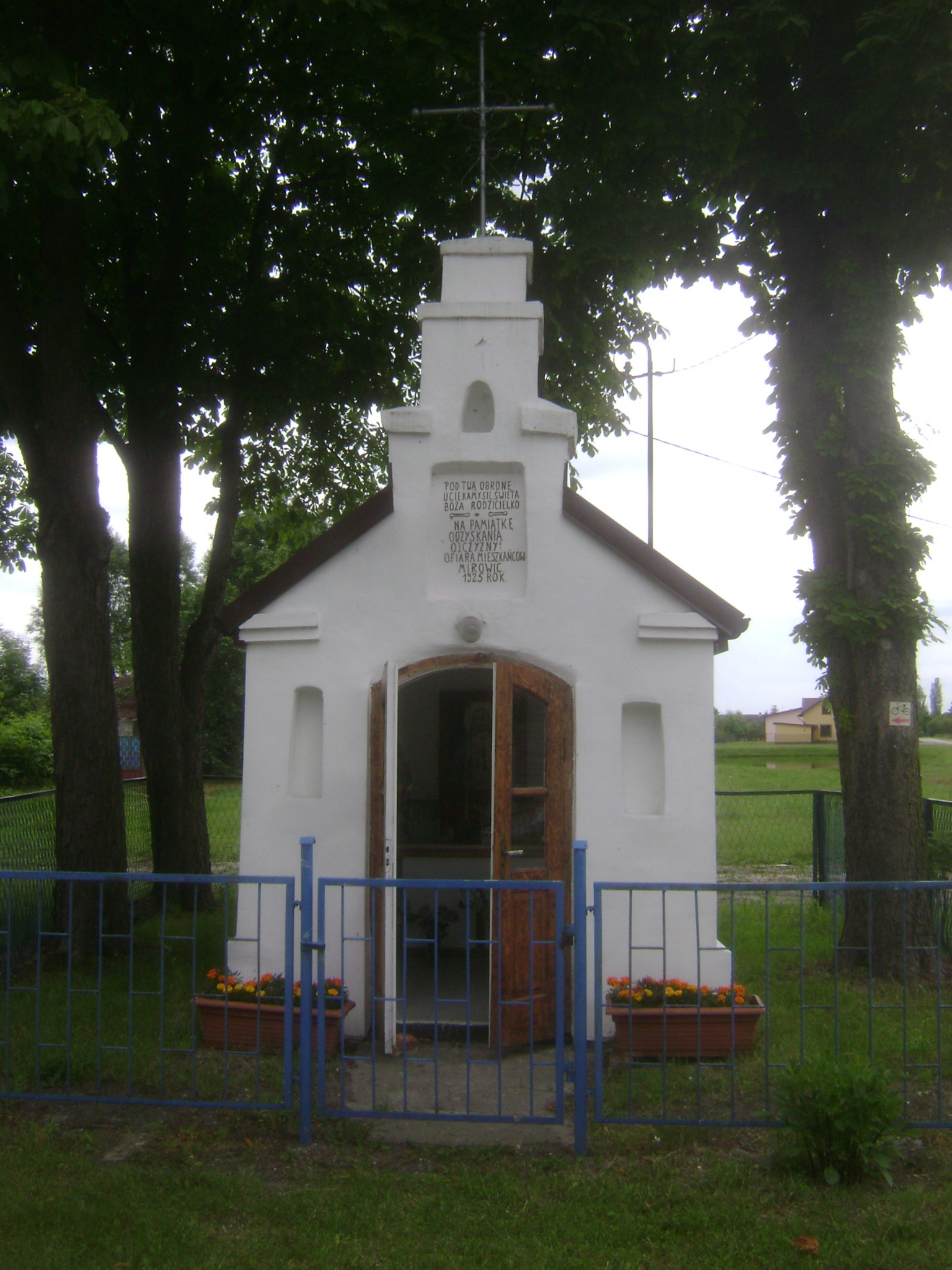

- Location within Poland
- Coordinates: 51°55′N 20°56′E
- Country: Poland
- Voivodeship: Masovian
- County: Grójec
- Gmina: Grójec

Mirowice [mirɔˈvit͡sɛ] is a village in the administrative district of Gmina Grójec, within Grójec County, Masovian Voivodeship, in east-central Poland.
