= Gościeńczyce =

- Village
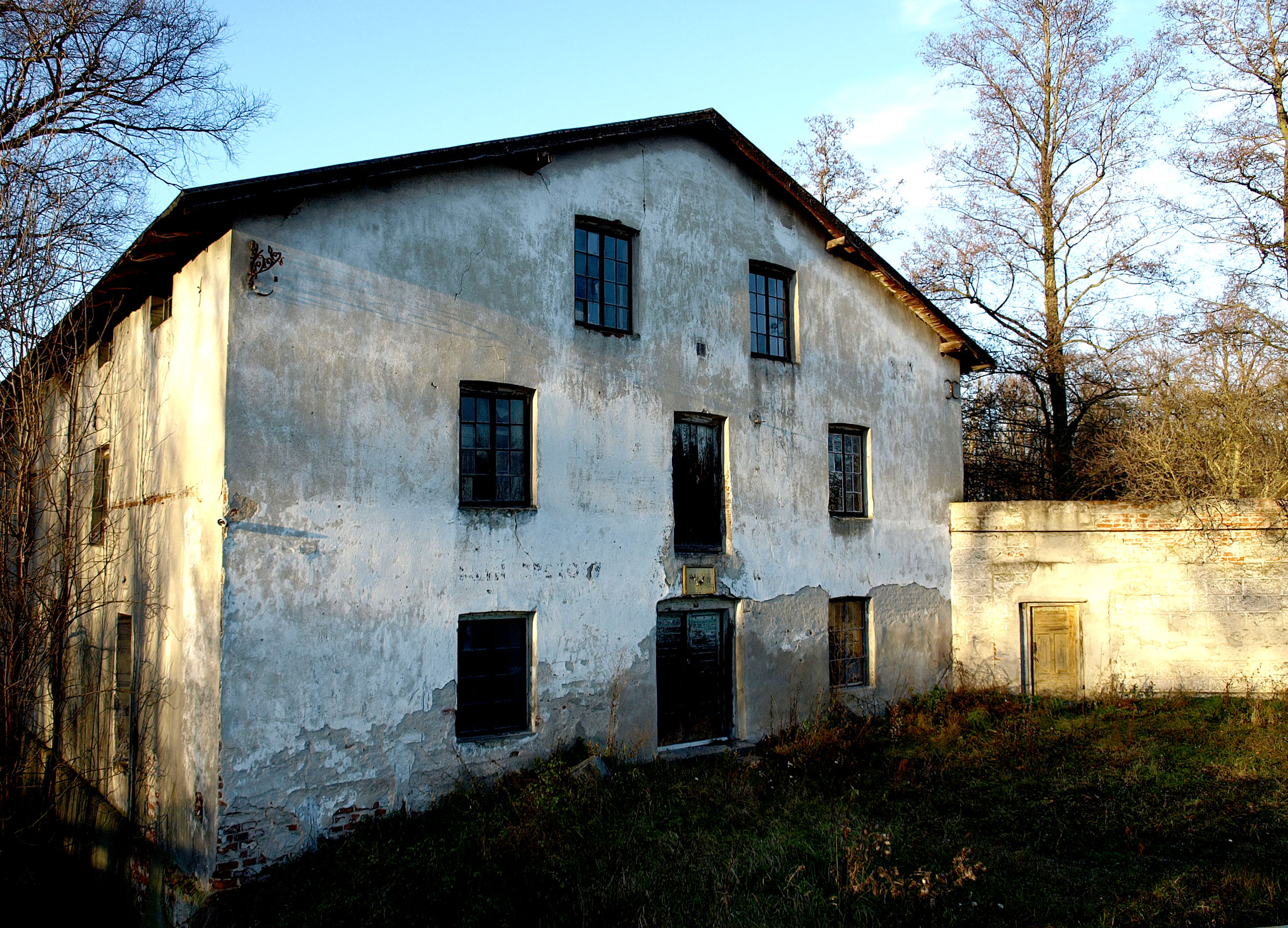
- Old mill in Gościeńczyce

- Location within Poland
- Coordinates: 51°55′N 20°57′E
- Country: Poland
- Voivodeship: Masovian
- County: Grójec
- Gmina: Grójec

Gościeńczyce (Polish pronunciation: [ɡɔɕt͡ɕɛj̃ˈt͡ʂɨt͡sɛ]) is a village in the administrative district of Gmina Grójec, within Grójec County, Masovian Voivodeship, in east-central Poland.
