= Kępina, Grójec County =

Kępina
- Village
- Location within Poland
- Coordinates: 51°50′43″N 20°52′12″E
- Country: Poland
- Voivodeship: Masovian
- County: Grójec
- Gmina: Grójec
- Population: 160

Kępina (Polish pronunciation: [kɛmˈpina]) is a village in the administrative district of Gmina Grójec, within Grójec County, Masovian Voivodeship, in east-central Poland.
