= Turka, Gmina Ostrów Mazowiecka =

Village in Masovian Voivodeship, Poland

Turka
- Village
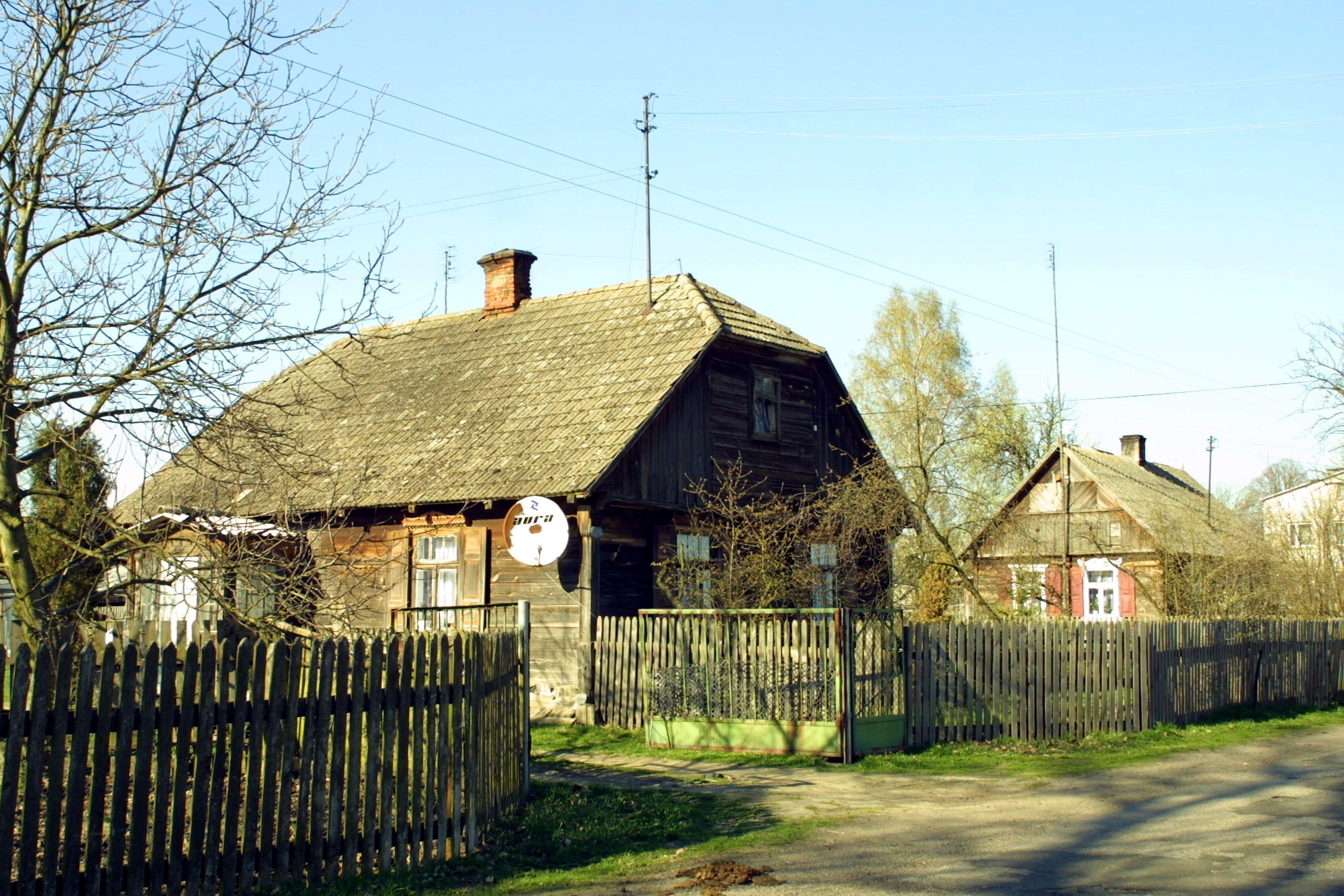
- Turka in 2007

- Location within Poland
- Coordinates: 52°44′42″N 21°49′5″E
- Country: Poland
- Voivodeship: Masovian
- County: Ostrów
- Gmina: Ostrów Mazowiecka
- Time zone: UTC+1 (CET)
  - Summer (DST): UTC+2 (CEST)
- Postal code: 07-300
- Vehicle registration: WOR

Turka [ˈturka] is a village in the administrative district of Gmina Ostrów Mazowiecka, within Ostrów County, Masovian Voivodeship, in central Poland.

== History ==
Historical population
Year	Pop.	±%
1827	55	—
1921	100	+81.8%

Turka was a private church village of the Diocese of Płock, administratively located in the Masovian Voivodeship in the Greater Poland Province of the Kingdom of Poland. As a village adjacent to Nagoszewo, the inhabitants of Turka enjoyed the privileges of Nagoszewo.

In 1921, the population was entirely Polish by nationality.

== Transport ==
The Expressway S8 passes nearby, north-west of the village.
