= Mikhail Turovsky =

Ukrainian artist

Mikhail Turovsky (Ukrainian: Михайло Туровський, Mykhaylo Turovsky; born in 1933 in Kyiv, in the Ukrainian SSR of the Soviet Union) is a Ukrainian-American artist-painter, and writer-aphorist, resident in New York City since 1979.

== Biography ==
=== Early life and education ===
Mikhail Turovsky was born in 1933 in Kyiv into the family of Shaul Turovsky, a taylor. During the Second World War, he was evacuated to Samarkand with his mother and an older brother. Although over the draft age, his father volunteered for active duty and was killed in action in 1943.

Turovsky attended the art school in Samarkand. His classmates included Ilya Kabakov (later a noted conceptualist artist).

Turovsky returned to Kyiv in 1944 and continued his studies at the Shevchenko State Art School. He later graduated from Kyiv Art Institute, where he studied under Tetyana Yablonska in 1960. He continued his postgraduate studies at the Moscow Academy of Art from 1965 until 1968.

=== Career ===
Turovsky commenced a prolific creative career in 1957, participating in numerous exhibitions of Ukrainian art in Kyiv, Moscow, as well as in many traveling exhibitions to Europe and Latin America. In 1962, he became a member of the Union of Artists of USSR.

Mikhail Turovsky forsook his official career for the sake of creative freedom and emigrated with his family to the United States in 1979. The Turovsky family first settled in the Bronx and he resumed his work there. After that important move, his career developed rapidly. His international reputation grew as he exhibited in New York, Jerusalem, Paris, Brussels, Madrid, Venice, Arles and other cities in Europe.

Mikhail Turovsky's work is represented in permanent collections of the National Art Museum of Ukraine in Kyiv, the State Tretyakov Gallery in Moscow, the Yad Vashem Memorial Art Museum in Jerusalem, the Herbert Johnson Museum of Art at Cornell University in New York, and the Notre Dame University Art Museum in Indiana, as well as many public and private collections. Among his well-known works are the cycle Holocaust, The End of an Utopia, many nudes, landscapes and still lifes; illustrations to the works of Ivan Franko, Vasyl Stefanyk, Aleksandr Blok, Sholom-Aleichem, Lion Feuchtwanger, Johannes Becher, and many other writers.

=== Honors ===
- In 2008, Turovsky was awarded the title of People's Artist of Ukraine by the President of Ukraine Viktor Yushchenko
- In 2009, he was voted in as a member of the Ukrainian Academy of Art.

== Aphorist ==
Turovsky is also the author of a collection of aphorisms, Itch of Wisdom (Hemlock Press, 1990) (originally published in Russian as Зуд Мудрости (Cikuta Press) in 1984). This book is considered influential in its genre in Russian. Many excerpts from it have been included in the russophone aphoristica anthologies.

Examples:

- "The first ape who became a man thus committed treason against his own kind."
- "Man is afraid of prison although he himself consists of cells."
- "Oppression is the legitimate mother of liberation. There's no hiding from alimony."
- "When your legs get weaker time starts running faster."
- "Broken wings fit more easily in standard-size boxes."
- "Death is so preoccupied with life, that it has no time for anything else."
- "Now the Rubicon peacefully flows into the Styx."
- "If you have got a fulcrum, there is no need to turn over the world."
- "The longer a dead-end, the more it looks like a road."

== Personal life ==
He lives and works in New York City, with his wife Sophia. He is the father of the painter and composer Roman Turovsky and the poet Genya Turovskaya.

== Literature ==
1. Mykhailo Turovsky. Plastic symphony. Painting and graphics : [exhibition catalogue] 11–31.08.2017. Kyiv : [Golden Section], 2017. 46 p. (in Ukrainian and English)
2. Chelsea Art Museum Exhibition Catalogue (introductory essay by Serge Lenczner, NYC, USA)
3. NOMI (Noviy Mir Iskusstva 4/45/2005, "Large Bodies: Great Success" by Serge Hollerbach, St. Petersburg, Russia)
4. Monograph "MIKHAIL TUROVSKY" (Introductory article by Xavier Xuriguera, text by Serge Lenczner), Editions Sauveur Attard, France
5. Catalogue for the retrospective exhibition at the National Art Museum of Ukraine, articles by Robert Morgan, Greg Kopelyan, Dmytro Horbachov
