= Turov (surname) =

The surname Turov (feminine: Turova) may refer to:

- Artem Turov
- Irina Turova, Soviet sprinter
- Maxim Turov (born 1979), Russian chess player
- Turau (surname), Belarusian-language form; may be used interchangeably with the Russian form for Belarusian persons
