= Turowicz =

Turowicz is a Polish surname. Notable people with the surname include:

- Jerzy Turowicz (1912–1999), Polish journalist
- Władysław Turowicz (1908–1980), Polish-Pakistani pilot and engineer

== See also ==
- Turovice
- Turka (disambiguation)
- Turkovich
