= Burdukovo, Syamzhensky District, Vologda Oblast =

Burdukovo Бурдуково
- Village
- Location within Vologda Oblast Location within Russia
- Coordinates: 60°00′N 40°41′E
- Country: Russia
- Region: Vologda Oblast
- District: Syamzhensky District
- Time zone: UTC+3:00

Burdukovo (Russian: Бурдуково) is a rural locality (a village) in Ustretskoye Rural Settlement, Syamzhensky District, Vologda Oblast, Russia. The population was 9 as of 2002.

== Geography ==
Burdukovo is located 29 km west of Syamzha (the district's administrative centre) by road. Fedosikha is the nearest rural locality.
