= Murder of Festus Okey =

On the evening of 20 August 2007, Festus Okey, a Nigerian footballer living in Turkey, was detained by an undercover police officer and fatally shot in police custody at the police station in Beyoğlu, Istanbul. The case was controversial and spurred several protests over the poor handling of the killing, with prime suspect Cengiz Yıldız also being the investigating officer and the unexplained loss of critical evidence, as well as racist and xenophobic profiling by law enforcement. Yıldız was initially found guilty of manslaughter in 2011 and sentenced to four years and two months in prison. However, the Court of Cassation reversed the decision on appeal to try Yıldız for murder. A second trial starting in 2018 with the participation of Okey's family, who live in Nigeria. In January 2021, the Constitutional Court of Turkey ruled that Okey has his right to life violated, ordering state compensation of ₺80,000 for his family. On 17 March 2021, Yıldız was resentenced to 16 years and eight months for murder, which has been reduced from a proposed life sentence.
