= Burdukovo, Vologodsky District, Vologda Oblast =

Burdukovo Бурдуково
- Village
- Location within Vologda Oblast Location within Russia
- Coordinates: 59°05′N 40°09′E
- Country: Russia
- Region: Vologda Oblast
- District: Vologodsky District
- Time zone: UTC+3:00

Burdukovo (Russian: Бурдуково) is a rural locality (a village) in Markovskoye Rural Settlement, Vologodsky District, Vologda Oblast, Russia. The population was 5 as of 2002.

== Geography ==
Burdukovo is located 24 km southeast of Vologda (the district's administrative centre) by road. Nikulino is the nearest rural locality.
