= Turov =

Turov may refer to:

- Turov, Belarus, town in Belarus and the capital of the medieval Principality of Turov
- Principality of Turov, medieval principality in the territory of modern southern Belarus and northern Ukraine
- Turov (surname)

== See also ==
- Turów (disambiguation)
