= Wola Krobowska =

- Village
- Location within Poland
- Coordinates: 51°51′45″N 20°55′00″E
- Country: Poland
- Voivodeship: Masovian
- County: Grójec
- Gmina: Grójec
- Time zone: UTC+1 (CET)
  - Summer (DST): UTC+2 (CEST)
- Vehicle registration: WGR

Wola Krobowska [ˈvɔla krɔˈbɔfska] is a village in the administrative district of Gmina Grójec, within Grójec County, Masovian Voivodeship, in east-central Poland. Population is 249.

== Exatel-Groundstation ==
The town is home to the only publicly known Starlink satellite ground station in Poland. The facility is operated in cooperation with the Polish telecommunications company Exatel. It serves as a central internet hub, providing satellite internet connectivity for large parts of Central and Eastern Europe, including critical communication links for Ukraine.

On the evening of September 23, 2026, an arson attack was carried out on the site. The power supply and the backup generators for the antenna facility were deliberately set on fire and damaged. Poland’s intelligence coordinator, Tomasz Siemoniak, stated that there is no doubt that Russian intelligence services are behind this act of sabotage. In mid-October 2026, German police arrested two members of the Turkish mafia who are suspected of having carried out the attack on behalf of others.
