= Wólka Turowska =

- Village
- Location within Poland
- Coordinates: 51°50′25″N 20°53′31″E
- Country: Poland
- Voivodeship: Masovian
- County: Grójec
- Gmina: Grójec

Wólka Turowska [ˈvulka tuˈrɔfska] is a village in the administrative district of Gmina Grójec, within Grójec County, Masovian Voivodeship, in east-central Poland.
