= Turka (Lake Baikal) =

Turka Турка
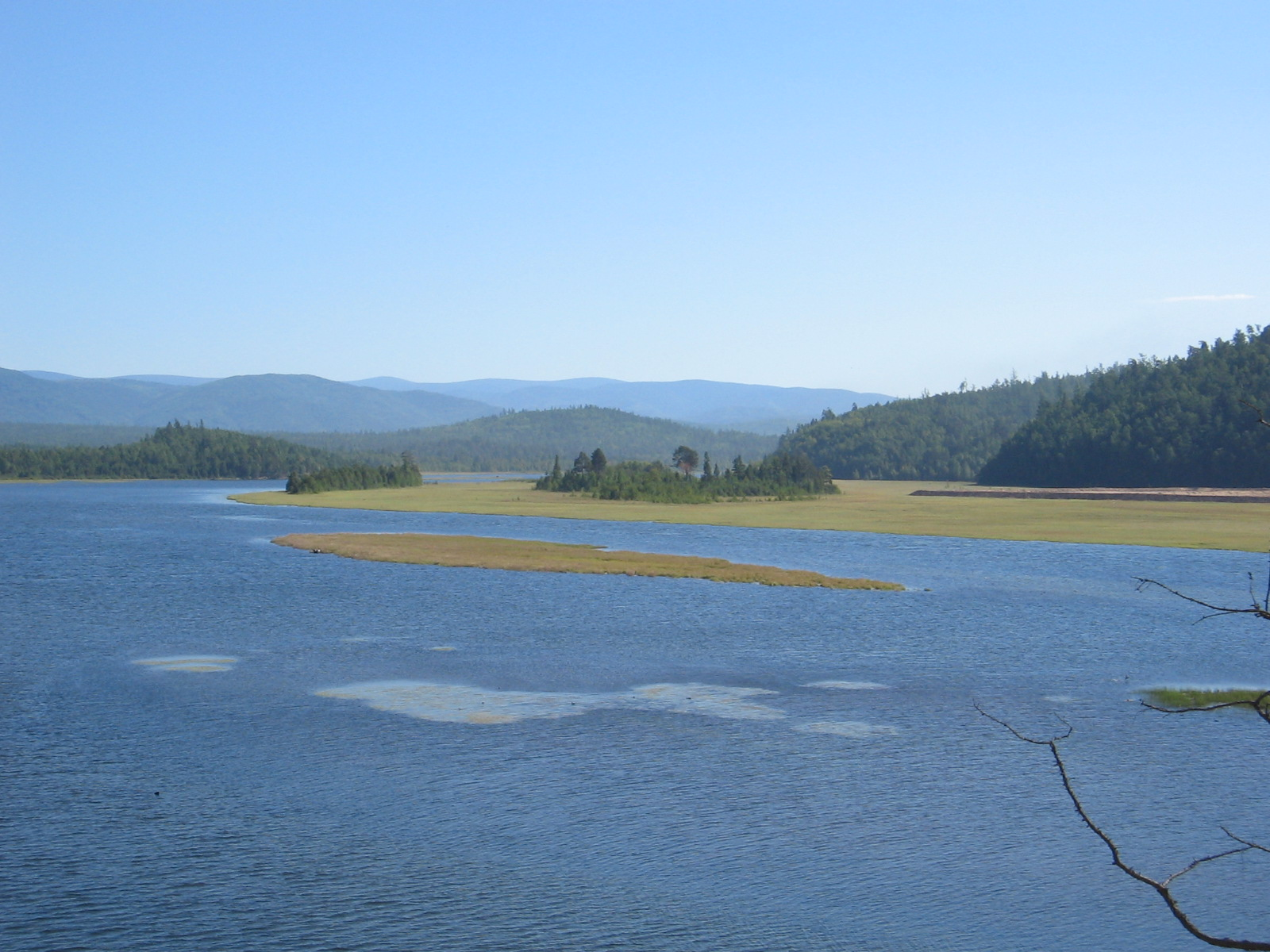
- View of the river near its mouth

- Mouth location in Buryatia, Russia

Location
- Country: Russia
- Federal subject: Buryatia

Physical characteristics
- Source
  - location: Ikat Range
  - coordinates: 53°15′31″N 110°40′53″E
  - elevation: 1,430 m (4,690 ft)
- Mouth: Lake Baikal
  - coordinates: 52°56′16″N 108°12′56″E
  - elevation: 456 m (1,496 ft)
- Length: 272 km (169 mi)
- Basin size: 5,870 km^{2} (2,270 sq mi)
- Discharge
  - average: 49.6 m^{3}/s (1,750 cu ft/s)

Basin features
- Progression: Lake Baikal→ Angara→ Yenisey→ Kara Sea

The Turka (Russian: Турка) is a river in the Republic of Buryatia, Russian Federation. It is one of the rivers flowing into Lake Baikal, and is 272 kilometres (169 mi) long, with a drainage basin of 5,870 square kilometres (2,270 mi^{2}). The Turka is fast-flowing and is good for rafting.

== Course ==
The Turka begins in the Ikat Range at an elevation of 1,430 m (4,690 ft), near where this range joins with the northern end of the Ulan-Burgas. It flows roughly westwards and southwestwards through rugged mountain terrain. Finally the river joins Lake Baikal in the lake's eastern shore by Turka village.

The main tributaries of the Turka are the Yambuy, Golonda, Ara-Khurtak, Uta, Urykta, Osinovka and Kotochik. Lake Kotokel lies 7.5 km (4.7 mi) southwest of the river mouth. The villages of Zolotoy Klyuch and Sobolikha are located by the Turka.

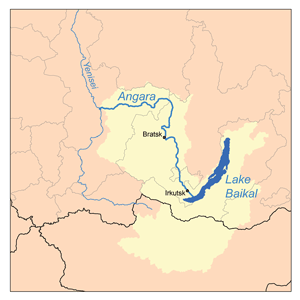
Angara/Baikal watershed.

== See also ==
- List of rivers of Russia
