= Gmina Grójec =

Gmina Grójec Grójec Commune
- Gmina
- Coat of arms
- Interactive map of Gmina Grójec
- Coordinates (Grójec): 51°51′56″N 20°52′3″E
- Country: Poland
- Voivodeship: Masovian
- County: Grójec
- Seat: Grójec

Area
  - Total: 120.64 km^{2} (46.58 sq mi)

Population (2006)
  - Total: 23,140
  - Density: 191.8/km^{2} (496.8/sq mi)
  - Urban: 14,990
  - Rural: 8,150
- Website: http://www.grojecmiasto.pl/

Gmina Grójec is an urban-rural gmina (administrative district) in Grójec County, Masovian Voivodeship, in east-central Poland. Its seat is the town of Grójec, which lies approximately 40 kilometres (25 mi) south of Warsaw.

The gmina covers an area of 120.64 square kilometres (46.6 sq mi), and as of 2006 its total population is 23,140 (out of which the population of Grójec amounts to 14,990, and the population of the rural part of the gmina is 8,150).

== Villages ==
Apart from the town of Grójec, Gmina Grójec contains the villages and settlements of Bikówek, Częstoniew, Dębie, Duży Dół, Falęcin, Głuchów, Gościeńczyce, Grudzkowola, Janówek, Kępina, Kobylin, Kociszew, Kośmin, Krobów, Las Lesznowolski, Lesznowola, Lisówek, Maciejowice, Marianów, Mieczysławówka, Mięsy, Mirowice, Pabierowice, Piekiełko, Podole, Skurów, Słomczyn, Szczęsna, Uleniec, Wola Krobowska, Wola Worowska, Wólka Turowska, Worów, Zakrzewska Wola, Załącze, Zalesie and Żyrówek.

== Neighbouring gminas ==
Gmina Grójec is bordered by the gminas of Belsk Duży, Chynów, Jasieniec, Pniewy, Prażmów and Tarczyn.
