= Genya Turovskaya =

Ukrainian American poet

Genya Turovskaya is a Ukrainian American poet, translator and psychotherapist born in Kyiv, Ukraine.

== Early life and education ==
Genya Turovskaya was born in Kyiv, Ukraine and grew up in the Bronx. She studied comparative literature at Bard College, and psychology at NYU. She received her MFA in comparative literature from Bard College in 2005.

== Career ==
Turovskaya authored the chapbooks, Calendar in 2002, The Tides in 2007, and New Year's Day in 2011.

She worked as an associate editor of the Eastern European Poets Series at Ugly Duckling Presse. where she co-translated two books of poetry: Red Shifting by Aleksandr Skidan published in 2008 and The Russian Version by Elena Fanailova in 2010, both published by Ugly Duckling Presse. The latter won the University of Rochester's Three Percent Solution award for Best Translated Book of Poetry in 2010.

In 2019, Turovskaya's collection of poems The Breathing Body Of This Thought was published by Black Square Editions. and she won the Whiting Award for Poetry in March 2020.

Her original poetry and translations from Russian have appeared in Chicago Review, Conjunctions, A Public Space, 6x6, Aufgabe, Poets and Poems, Octopus, jubilat, Tantalum, Gulf Coast, Jacket, Saltgrass, Shifter, Supermachine, and other publications.

== Awards and fellowships ==
- Whiting Award for Poetry 2020.
- MacDowell Colony Fellowship
- Montana Artist Refuge Fellowship
- the Witter Bynner Translation Residency at Santa Fe Art Institute
- Fund for Poetry grant

== Personal life ==
Turovskaya lives in Brooklyn, New York.

== Bibliography ==
- The Breathing Body of This Thought (Black Square Editions 2019)
- Calendar, 2002 (Ugly Duckling Presse)
- The Tides, 2007 (Octopus Books)
- New Year’s Day, 2011 (Octopus Books)
- Dear Jenny (Supermachine)
