= JoAnn Turovsky =

American musician and teacher

JoAnn Turovsky is a harpist, professor, and harp teacher in Los Angeles, California.

She is a faculty member at the Thornton School of Music at the University of Southern California and at the Colburn School of Performing Arts. At USC, her work includes teaching harp graduate students how to teach beginning students. She also serves on the faculty at the Music Academy of the West. She is principal harpist with the Los Angeles Opera Orchestra and the Los Angeles Chamber Orchestra.

She has recorded for numerous motion pictures and television shows as a studio musician, including for many film scores by John Williams. She was featured as a soloist in the soundtracks for Angela's Ashes and The Book Thief. She played on the soundtrack for Star Wars: The Force Awakens.

She is a member of the American Federation of Musicians. In 2015, she received a Lifetime Achievement Award from the American Harp Society.
