= Turów =

Turów or Turow may refer to:

== Economy ==
- Turów Coal Mine
- Turów Power Station

== Places in Poland ==
- Turów, Gmina Głogów in Lower Silesian Voivodeship (south-west Poland)
- Turów, Gmina Pęcław in Lower Silesian Voivodeship (south-west Poland)
- Turów, Gmina Bogatynia a former village Lower Silesian Voivodeship (south-west Poland)
- Turów, Lubin County in Lower Silesian Voivodeship (south-west Poland)
- Turów, Wrocław County in Lower Silesian Voivodeship (south-west Poland)
- Turów Zgorzelec - Polish basketball team, based in Zgorzelec
- Turów, Łódź Voivodeship (central Poland)
- Turów, Lublin Voivodeship (east Poland)
- Turów, Masovian Voivodeship (east-central Poland)
- Turów, Silesian Voivodeship (south Poland)
- Turów, Lubusz Voivodeship (west Poland)
- Turów, the Polish name of Turaŭ, Belarus

== People ==
- Scott Turow (born 1949), American author and lawyer

== See also ==
- Turov (disambiguation)
