= Pribaykalsky District =

Pribaykalsky District Прибайкальский район (Russian)
- District

Other transcription(s)
  - Buryat: Байгал шадар аймаг
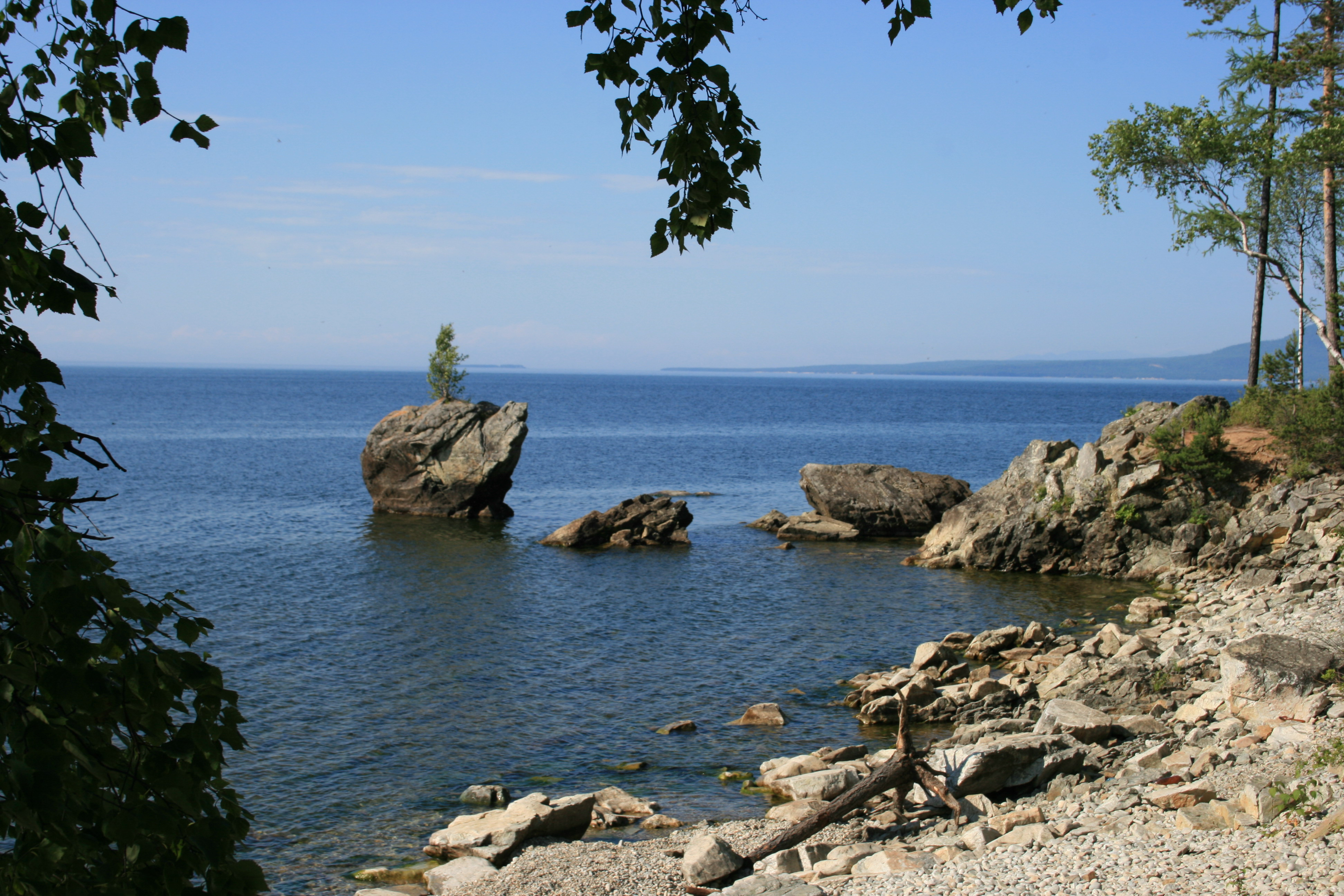
- Turtle Stone, a natural monument near the selo of Turka in Pribaykalsky District

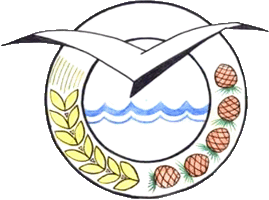
- Coat of arms
- Location of Pribaykalsky District in the Buryat Republic
- Coordinates: 52°12′N 107°37′E
- Country: Russia
- Federal subject: Republic of Buryatia
- Established: December 12, 1940
- Administrative center: Turuntayevo

Area
  - Total: 15,472 km^{2} (5,974 sq mi)

Population (2010 Census)
  - Total: 26,856
  - Density: 1.7358/km^{2} (4.4957/sq mi)
  - Urban: 0%
  - Rural: 100%

Administrative structure
  - Administrative divisions: 9 Selsoviets
  - Inhabited localities: 38 rural localities

Municipal structure
  - Municipally incorporated as: Pribaykalsky Municipal District
  - Municipal divisions: 0 urban settlements, 10 rural settlements
- Time zone: UTC+8 (MSK+5)
- OKTMO ID: 81642000
- Website: http://pribajkal.ru

Population of Pribaykalsky District
- 2010 Census: 26,856
- 2002 Census: 28,651
- 1989 Census: 31,181
- 1979 Census: 28,501

Pribaykalsky District (Russian: Прибайка́льский райо́н; Buryat: Байгал шадар аймаг, romanized: Baigal Shadar aimag) is an administrative and municipal district (raion), one of the twenty-one in the Republic of Buryatia, Russia. It is located in the center of the republic. The area of the district is 15,472 square kilometers (5,974 sq mi). Its administrative center is the rural locality (a selo) of Turuntayevo. As of the 2010 Census, the total population of the district was 26,856, with the population of Turuntayevo accounting for 22.0% of that number.

== Geography ==
The district is mountainous and limited by the Morskoy, Khamar-Daban, Ulan-Burgas and Golondin ranges. It is bound on the northeast by the shores of Lake Baikal and by the left bank of the Selenga River in the southwestern part. The Turka and Itantsa are other important rivers of the area.

== History ==
The district was established on December 12, 1940 from parts of the territories of Kabansky and Barguzinsky Districts.

== Administrative and municipal status ==
Within the framework of administrative divisions, Pribaykalsky District is one of the twenty-one in the Republic of Buryatia. The district is divided into nine selsoviets, which comprise thirty-eight rural localities. As a municipal division, the district is incorporated as Pribaykalsky Municipal District. Its nine selsoviets are incorporated as ten rural settlements within the municipal district. The selo of Turuntayevo serves as the administrative center of both the administrative and municipal district.
