= Turuntayevo, Republic of Buryatia =

Rural locality in the Republic of Buryatia, Russia

Turuntayevo Турунтаево
- Selo

Other transcription(s)
  - Buryat: Турантай
- Interactive map of Turuntayevo
- Location of Turuntayevo Turuntayevo (Republic of Buryatia)
- Coordinates: 51°12′02″N 107°38′46″E
- Country: Russia
- Federal subject: Buryatia
- Administrative district: Pribaykalsky District
- SelsovietSelsoviet: Turuntayevsky

Population (2010 Census)
  - Total: 5,901
  - Estimate (2021): 5,628 (−4.6%)

Administrative status
  - Capital of: Pribaykalsky District, Turuntayevsky Selsoviet

Municipal status
  - Municipal district: Pribaykalsky Municipal District
  - Rural settlement: Turuntayevskoye Rural Settlement
  - Capital of: Pribaykalsky Municipal District, Turuntayevskoye Rural Settlement
- Time zone: UTC+8 (MSK+5)
- Postal code: 671260
- OKTMO ID: 81642488101

Turuntayevo (Russian: Турунта́ево, Buryat: Турантай, Turantai) is a rural locality (a selo) and the administrative center of Pribaykalsky District of the Republic of Buryatia, Russia. Population: 5,901 (2010 census); 6,376 (2002 census); 6,386 (1989 Soviet census).
