= Anthony Mangano =

American actor

- Born: Brooklyn, New York City, U.S.
- Other name: Tony Mangano
- Occupation: Actor
- Years active: 1985–present
- Spouse: Theresa Mangano
- Children: 1

Anthony J. Mangano is an American actor. He has guest starred in a number of notable television series, including Diff'rent Strokes, Who's the Boss?, 227, Charles in Charge, Step by Step, Murder, She Wrote, Party of Five, Spin City, Seinfeld and The Wire. He also appeared recurrently on NYPD Blue, Law & Order, Rescue Me, Blue Bloods, Public Morals, Law & Order: Special Victims Unit and Person of Interest.

Mangano has appeared in the films Point Break, 8 Heads in a Duffel Bag, Raising Helen, Inside Man, The Family, Lost Cat Corona, The Dictator, and Green Book, and in video games The Warriors, Grand Theft Auto IV, Manhunt 2, Need for Speed: Undercover and Grand Theft Auto: The Lost and Damned.

== Filmography ==
=== Film ===
Year	Title	Role	Notes
1986	If Looks Could Kill	Policeman	
1991	Point Break	Off Duty Cop	
1997	8 Heads in a Duffel Bag	Rico	
1997	The Corporate Ladder	Det. Maiola	
2000	All Saints Day	Larry	
2000	The Exchange	David Naldoff	
2003	Crooked Lines	Joe	
2004	Raising Helen	Club Doorman	
2005	The Signs of the Cross	Father Jeremy	
2006	Inside Man	ESU Officer	
2006	A Merry Little Christmas	Humphrey	
2007	Made in Brooklyn	FBI agent	
2008	Priceless	Ike	
2011	Roadie	Male Cop	
2011	Jesse	Rocky	
2012	The Dictator	Arresting Officer	
2013	West End	Lou Prescotti	
2013	The Family	BBQ Mobster	
2015	Sweet Lorraine	Dominic	
2016	Our Time	Joseph	
2016	Saturday in the Park	Louie the Pizza Man	
2016	Courier X	Dominic Vollani	
2017	Lost Cat Corona	Dominic Sr.	
2018	Summer Days, Summer Nights	Member	Uncredited
2018	Empathy, Inc.	Officer Cortona	
2018	Green Book	Copa Bouncer Danny	
2018	The Brawler	Sylvester Stallone	
2020	5th Borough	Det. Dominic Carullo	
2021	The Birthday Cake	Uncle Sal	

=== Television ===
Year	Title	Role	Notes
1985	Diff'rent Strokes	Rambo Impersonator	Episode: "It's My Party and I'll Cry If I Want To"
1988	Our House	Vargo	Episode: "Call It a Draw"
1989	Who's the Boss?	Security Guard #3	Episode: "Party Double"
1989	Hard Time on Planet Earth	Punk #1	Episode: "The Way Home"
1989	227	Repo Man	Episode: "Tenants, Anyone?"
1990	The Hogan Family	Frank Kelso	Episode: "Bad Day at Bossy Burger"
1990	Life Goes On	Big Ron	Episode: "Corky Rebels"
1990	Charles in Charge	Slick	Episode: "Child Hoods"
1991	Father Dowling Mysteries	Man	Episode: "The Substitute Sister Mystery"
1991	Step by Step	Psycho	Episode: "Just for Kicks"
1991	Get a Life	Wino	Episode: "Larry on the Loose"
1993	The Hat Squad	Joey	Episode: "The Liquidator"
1993	Shaky Ground	The Burglar	Episode: "Misery"
1993, 1998	Seinfeld	Fireman / Marine	Episodes: "The Maid"; "The Outing"
1994	Murder, She Wrote	Oscar James Gandile	Episode: "Deadly Assets"
1995–2007	Law & Order	Various roles	4 episodes
1996	Style & Substance	Jimmy	Television film
1997	Mad About You	The Orderly	Episode: "The Birth: Part 2"
1998	Spin City	Robber	Episode: "Bye, Bye, Birdie"
1998	Party of Five	Andy	Episode: "Opposites Distract"
1999	Trinity	Ronnie	Episode: "Having Trouble with the Language"
2000	Third Watch	ESU Cop	Episode: "This Band of Brothers"
2000–2003	NYPD Blue	Officer Ed Laughlin	15 episodes
2000–2015	Law & Order: Special Victims Unit	Various roles	3 episodes
2004–2009	Rescue Me	Bobby Vincent	10 episodes
2005	Law & Order: Trial by Jury	Nick Marks	Episode: "Baby Boom
2008	The Wire	Det. Kevin Infante	Episode: "Unconfirmed Reports"
2009	Cupid	Anthony Russo	Episode: "My Fair Masseuse"
2011–2013	Blue Bloods	Detective / Cop	5 episodes
2011–2014	Person of Interest	Detective Kane	6 episodes
2012	Unforgettable	Eddie Dal Bello	Episode: "Allegiances"
2013	Castle	Roman Valanciaga	Episode: "The Good, the Bad & the Baby"
2014	CSI: Crime Scene Investigation	Male Passenger	Episode: "Keep Calm and Carry-On"
2014	Taxi Brooklyn	Coop	Episode: "Precious Cargo"
2014	Babylon Fields	Garza	Television film
2015	The Blacklist	Officer	Episode: "The Longevity Initiative (No. 97)"
2015	Public Morals	Det. Tony Battalina	4 episodes
2015	The Mysteries of Laura	Bob	Episode: "The Mystery of the Watery Grave"
2016	The Good Wife	Hal	Episode: "Hearing"
2016	Elementary	Bottled Water Supervisor	Episode: "The Invisible Hand"
2016	Quantico	NYPD Officer Carl Adams	2 episodes
2017	Half Life	Officer Moran	Episode: "Pilot"
2018	Escape at Dannemora	Anthony J. Annucci	Episode: "Part 7"
2019	The System	Chief Guest	Television film

=== Video games ===
Year	Title	Role	Notes
2005	The Warriors	Police	
2007	Manhunt 2	Neighborhood Civilian	
2008	Grand Theft Auto IV	The Crowd of Liberty City	
2008	Need for Speed: Undercover	Secondary #3	
2009	Grand Theft Auto: The Lost and Damned	Officer	Credited as Anthony J. Mangano
