= Kathy Searle =

American film and theater actress (born 1981)

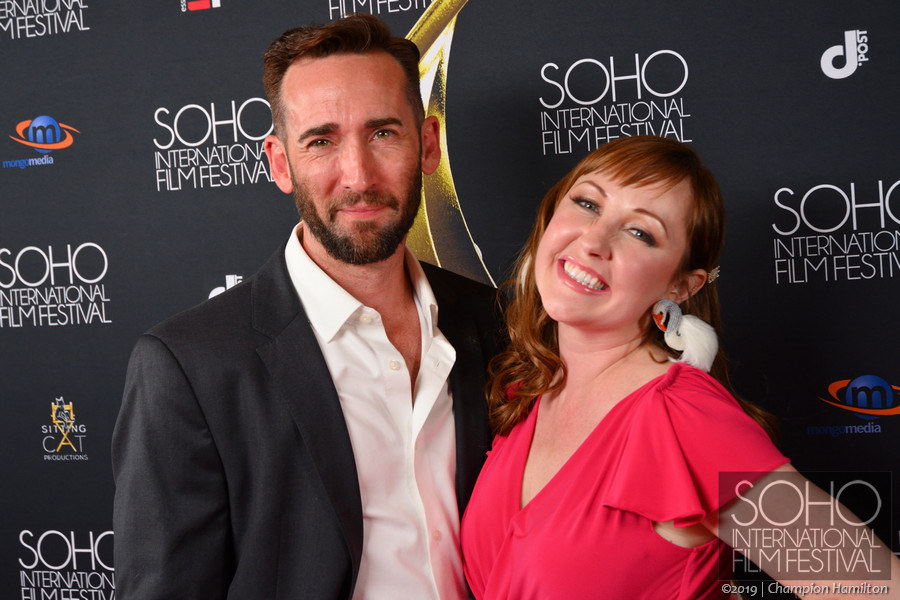
- Kathy Searle and Daniel Keith at the SoHo International Film Festival in 2019
- Born: New Rochelle, New York
- Education: American Academy of Dramatic Arts
- Occupation: Actress
- Years active: 1993–present
- Notable work: My Man Is a Loser

Kathy Searle is an American actress. She is known for her role in My Man Is a Loser. She was starred in several TV series including Body of Proof, Blue Bloods, Gossip Girl, and Lipstick Jungle.

== Early life and education ==
Born in New Rochelle, New York, Searle went to New Rochelle High School. Her early acting career started at the age of 12. Following that, she took admission in American Academy of Dramatic Arts. Searle also went to Upright Citizens Brigade for her comedy career.

== Career ==
At the age of 12, Searle started her acting career with commercials and small roles in TV shows. She appeared in several TV shows including The Bunny Hole, Law & Order, Gossip Girl and As the World Turns. Other than that, she also performed in various films. She had leading roles in My Man Is a Loser and Being Michael Madsen. Searle starred in the a cappella musical comedy Perfect Harmony at the Clurman Theatre in New York City and also had some roles in theater such as Apple Cove and The Awesome 80s Prom.

== Filmography ==
=== Film ===
| Year | Title | Role | Notes |
|---|---|---|---|
| 2004 | Peoples | Racist girl | |
| 2007 | Being Michael Madsen | Jackie Clark | |
| 2008 | Baby Mama | Cool mom | |
| 2009 | The Good Guy | Susan | |
| 2010 | Meskada | Jane Hartfield | |
| 2010 | 3 Backyards | Ticket agent | |
| 2012 | Petunia | Lynn | |
| 2014 | My Man is a Looser | Lianne | |
| 2017 | Pitching Tents | Ms. Keyes | |
| 2017 | Diane | Sally | |
| 2018 | Empathy, Inc. | Jessica | |
| 2020 | Here After | Karen | |
| 2021 | The Changed | Kathy Walters | |
| 2021 | Where's Rose | Mary Daniels | |
| 2022 | Love in Kilnerry | Nessa Ward | |

=== Television ===
| Year | Title | Role | Notes |
|---|---|---|---|
| 2006 | Hope & Faith | Real Estate Agent | 1 episode |
| 2007 | Starveillance | 6+ Celebrity Voices | 6 episodes |
| 2010 | Law & Order | Sylvia Corgan | 1 episode |
| 2011 | Body of Proof | Irina Tomislava | 1 episode |
| 2012 | Blue Bloods | Diane Reade | 1 episode |

=== Video games ===
| Year | Title | Role |
|---|---|---|
| 2011 | Saints Row: The Third | Radio Voices |
| 2013 | Grand Theft Auto V | The Local Population |
| 2018 | Red Dead Redemption II | The Local Pedestrian Population |
| 2019 | Red Dead Online | Etta Doyle's Gang |
| 2023 | Horizon Forbidden West: The Burning Shores | Additional Voices |

== Awards ==
- Outstanding actress – Planet Connection Festival (2014)
- Special guest star - NYC Web Fest (2015)
- Best actress – 48 Hour Film Festival (2016)
