= Empathy, Inc. =

2018 film

- Theatrical release poster
- Directed by: Yedidya Gorsetman
- Written by: Mark Leidner
- Produced by: Yedidya Gorsetman; Josh Itzkowitz; Mark Leidner
- Starring: Zack Robidas; Kathy Searle; Jay Klaitz
- Cinematography: Darin Quan
- Edited by: Shira Arad
- Music by: Omri Anghel
- Production company: Rigel Films
- Distributed by: Dark Star Pictures; Oration Films
- Release dates: June 24, 2018 (Cinepocalypse); September 6, 2019 (United States)
- Running time: 97 minutes
- Country: United States
- Language: English
- Budget: $30,000

Empathy, Inc. is a 2018 American science fiction thriller film directed by Yedidya Gorsetman, written by Mark Leidner, and produced by Josh Itzkowitz, starring Zack Robidas, Kathy Searle, and Jay Klaitz. It premiered at Cinepocalypse on June 24, 2018, and was released theatrically on September 6, 2019.

== Plot ==
The film tells the story of Joel, a struggling tech venture capitalist who invests his and his in-laws money in an extreme virtual reality company called Empathy Inc., whose proposed technology will allow wealthy people to spend time in the shoes of the less fortunate.

== Cast ==
- Zack Robidas as Joel
- Kathy Searle as Jessica
- Jay Klaitz as Lester
- Eric Berryman as Nicolaus
- AJ Cedeno as Sonny
- Charmaine Reedy as Vicky
- Fenton Lawless as Ward
- Anthony Mangano as Officer Cortona
- Karen Lynn Gorney as Miss Miriam

== Production ==
The film was written by Mark Leidner, directed by Yedidya Gorsetman, and produced by Josh Itzkowitz; the three previously worked together on the 2014 romantic comedy Jammed. It was shot over the course of six weeks in New York City in 2017.

== Release ==
Empathy, Inc. premiered at Cinepocalypse on June 24, 2018. It went on to screen at Brooklyn Horror Film Festival, Austin Film Festival, Philadelphia Film Festival, and Panic Fest. In May 2019, it was announced that Dark Star Pictures had acquired North American rights to the film, and that it had been picked up by Oration Films for international distribution. It was released theatrically on September 6, 2019, followed by a VOD release on September 24, 2019.

== Reception ==
On review aggregator Rotten Tomatoes, Empathy, Inc. holds an approval rating of 85%, based on 27 reviews, and an average rating of 7.3/10. On Metacritic, the film has a weighted average score of 48 out of 100, based on 4 critics, indicating "mixed or average" reviews.

Alex McLevy in The A.V. Club wrote that the film "seethes with low-level menace and anxiety, and features a protagonist navigating a technological marvel that spins off the rails… it tells a solid story with verve and deft pacing." Richard Whittaker of The Austin Chronicle called it "an intricate and incisive dissection of greed, vicarious living, guilt, and the precariousness of the American middle class." Brian Tallerico of RogerEbert.com called the film's concept "brilliant". Dennis Harvey of Variety called it "a clever indie suspense that draws on fantasy-tinged notions of virtual reality and identity exchange to create an ingenious tale more in the realm of an intimately-scaled thriller than sci-fi."
