= Michael Mongillo =

American film director

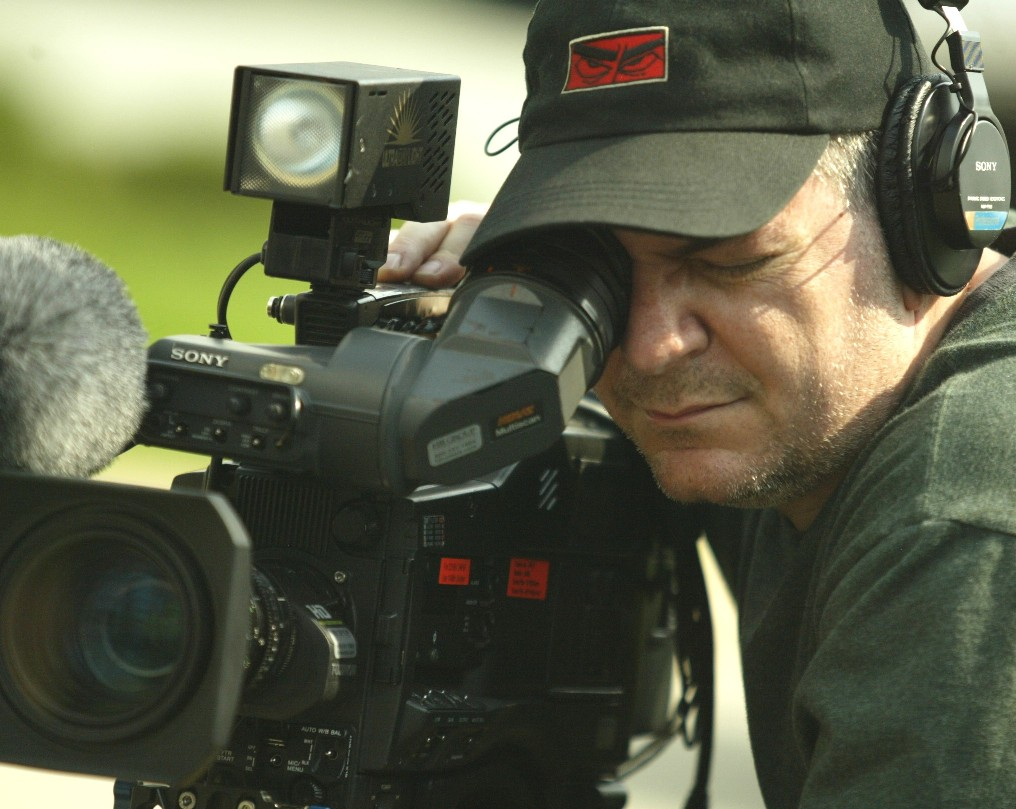
Michael Mongillo

Michael Mongillo is an American feature film director, screenwriter, and producer. He is best known for the 2007 mockumentary Being Michael Madsen, the 2017 supernatural mystery Diane, and the 2021 sci-fi thriller The Changed.

== Career ==
Mongillo founded Mean Time Productions in 1997. The production company credits include the Shriekfest award-winning psychological horror The Wind (2001), the sci-fi dramedy Welcome to Earth (2005), the mockumentary Being Michael Madsen (2007), the supernatural mystery Diane (2017), and the sci-fi thriller The Changed (2021). His work has screened worldwide, including the Raindance Film Festival, the Denver Film Festival, San Francisco Independent Film Festival, Screamfest, FrightFest London, and the New Filmmakers Series, receiving positive press from The New York Times, Variety, BoxOffice, Fangoria, LA Weekly, Time Out, Film Threat, Londonist, and others. Mongillo has also directed several shorts, music videos, and commercials.

Mongillo co-founded the annual New Haven Underground Film Festival, which was launched with Todd Dzicek in 2004. In 2009, Mongillo spearheaded its rebranding as the Maverick Movie Awards and, with Dick Boland, engaged in forming a diverse network of entertainment industry professionals to participate in this international “filmmakers honoring filmmakers” cooperative. Its exponential growth precipitated Maverick Awards for the films Sound City, The Imposter, Downloaded, The Maiden Danced to Death, and more celebrated features and shorts. Mongillo departed the MMA in 2013 to devote more time to his pursuits as a filmmaker.

In 1993, Mongillo wrote the comic book The Philistine and co-creator Michael Zittel illustrated the series. The super-spy-turned-superhero saga was originally distributed by One Shot Press, which went out of business after publishing only three of the six issues in the mini-series. The Philistine was revived a decade later by United Comics and the original mini-series plus several subsequent stories were released as a graphic novel anthology in 2003. In 2012, Mongillo created and wrote the graphic novel The Lost Girl with artwork by Rob Ten Pas. This fantasy-horror romance was originally released by Arcana Studio and in 2015 it was republished in Heavy Metal and digital.

Along with Chris Wiedemann (vocals/guitar), Bobby Judkins (drums), and John Thudium (guitar), Mongillo (bass) was a founding member of the Rock band, 50 Feet Tall (a.k.a. Fifty Feet Tall), a mainstay of NYC's original music scene in the '90s. Band highlights include a release on Deep Elm Records with positive reviews from Alternative Press, CMJ, Hits, Magnet, and more.

== Awards and honors ==
Year	Recipient/Nominated Work	Event	Award
2022	The Changed	Award This!	Best Indie Sci-fi Nominee; Best Director Nominee; Indie Movie of the Year Nominee
2022	The Changed	Rondo Hatton Classic Horror Awards	Best Independent Film Nominee
2021	The Changed	Screamfest, Los Angeles, CA	Competition Selection
2021	The Changed	FrightFest, London, UK	Competition Selection
2021	The Changed	New York City Horror Film Festival, New York, NY	Competition Selection
2021	The Changed	South African Horrorfest, Cape Town, South Africa	Special Selection
2018	Diane	Rondo Hatton Classic Horror Awards	Best Independent Film Nominee
2017	Diane	New York City Horror Film Festival, New York, NY	Competition Selection
2017	Diane	FrightFest, London, UK	Competition Selection
2012	Mockumentary Retrospective: Being Michael Madsen	New Horizons International Film Festival, Warsaw, Poland	Honoree
2009	Opening Night Feature: Being Michael Madsen	Dances With Films, Hollywood, CA	Honoree
2008	Being Michael Madsen	Mockumentary Film Festival, Hollywood, CA	Best Director
2008	Being Michael Madsen	Faux Film Festival, Portland, OR	Audience Award
2008	Being Michael Madsen	San Francisco Independent Film Festival, San Francisco, CA	Competition Selection
2007	Being Michael Madsen	Denver Film Festival, Denver, CO	Competition Selection
2007	Being Michael Madsen	Raindance Film Festival, London, UK	Competition Selection
2007	The Lost Girl	Shriekfest Film Festival, Hollywood, CA	Best Screenplay
2006	Welcome to Earth	WorldFest Houston, Houston, TX	Bronze: Remi Award
2006	Welcome to Earth	Bare Bones International Film Festival, Muskogee, OK	Best Dramedy Feature Nominee; Best Ensemble Cast Nominee
2003	UnSeen (with James Charbonneau)	Shriekfest Film Festival, Hollywood, CA	Best Screenplay
2002	The Wind	Bare Bones International Film Festival, Muskogee, OK	Best Picture: Horror/Sci-Fi
2002	The Wind	Valleyfest Film Festival, Knoxville, Tennessee	Competition Selection
2001	The Wind	Shriekfest Film Festival, Hollywood, CA	Best Picture
2001	The Wind	Dances With Films, Hollywood, CA	Competition Selection
