= Karina Arroyave =

Colombian-American actress

- Arroyave in 2026
- Born: July 16, 1969 (age 57); Colombia
- Occupation: Actress
- Years active: 1988–present

Karina Arroyave (born July 16, 1969) is a Colombian-American actress. She began her career starring as Bianca Marquez Walsh in the CBS daytime soap opera As the World Turns (1989–1994), and later made her big screen debut appearing in the biographical drama film Lean On Me (1989). Arroyave later had supporting roles in a number of movies and played recurring roles on television series 24 (2001–2002) as Jamey Farrell, Orange Is the New Black (2019) as Karla Cordova, and The Blacklist (2021–2022) as Mierce Xiu.

== Life and career ==
Arroyave was born in Colombia and moved to New York City with her grandmother at the age of 1. She studied acting at Fiorello H. LaGuardia High School and later studied comedic acting at The Groundlings in Los Angeles. She made her stage debut playing the title role in Marisol at the Louisville Humana Festival. In November 1988 Arroyave made her screen/television debut in a brief appearance on the vigilante action series The Equalizer in the episode, "Sea of Fire" as a high-school girl (screen-credited as "Girl #1"). Afterwards she joined the cast of CBS daytime soap opera As the World Turns as Bianca Marquez Walsh, Lucinda Walsh's (Elizabeth Hubbard) adoptive daughter. Arroyave was regular cast member to 1994. In 1993, she made her Broadway debut in the Jane Bowles' play In the Summer House at Vivian Beaumont Theater.

Arroyave made her big screen debut appearing in the 1989 biographical drama film Lean On Me opposite Morgan Freeman and Beverly Todd. She later had supporting roles in films Falling Down (1993), The Cowboy Way (1994), Trial by Jury (1994), Dangerous Minds (1995), One Eight Seven (1997), In Too Deep (1999), Flawless (1999), Empire (2002) and Crash (2004). She co-starred in the Hallmark Hall of Fame 1993 film Blind Spot opposite Joanne Woodward. On television, Arroyave made guest-starring appearances in Law & Order, New York Undercover, The Practice, Brooklyn South, Chicago Hope, Touched by an Angel and NYPD Blue. Arroyave played the role of Jamey Farrell during the first season of Fox series 24 from 2001 to 2002. She later had supporting roles in films Adrift in Manhattan (2007), Adam (2009), Holy Rollers (2010) and Lost Cat Corona (2017).

In 2019, Arroyave played Karla Córdova, a Salvadoran detainee, during the final season of Netflix comedy-drama series, Orange Is the New Black. From 2021 to 2022 she had a recurring role as Mierce Xiu in the NBC series The Blacklist. In 2023 she appeared in the Hulu miniseries A Murder at the End of the World, and in 2024 co-starred opposite Guillermo Diaz in the thriller film, You Can't Stay Here.

== Filmography ==
=== Film ===
Year	Title	Role	Notes
1989	Lean On Me	Maria	
1993	Falling Down	Angie	
1994	The Cowboy Way	Rosa	
1994	Trial By Jury	Mercedes	
1995	Dangerous Minds	Josy	
1997	One Eight Seven	Rita Martinez	
1998	Shock Television	Lonnie	
1999	In Too Deep	G.G.	
1999	Flawless	Amber	
2002	Empire	Cheena	
2004	Crash	Elizabeth	
2007	Adrift in Manhattan	Christina	
2007	The Proctor	Nurse	Short film
2009	Adam	Anna Maria	
2010	Holy Rollers	Fabric Customer	
2014	Family on Board	Yvette Petito	Short film
2016	The Karma Club	Guess	
2017	Lost Cat Corona	Lucia	
2020	First One In	Valentina	
2023	You Can't Stay Here	Samantha	
2024	The Reunion	Marguerite	
2026	The Only Living Pickpocket in New York	Rosie	

=== Television ===
Year	Title	Role	Notes
1988	The Equalizer	Girl #1	Episode: "Sea of Fire"
1989–1994	As the World Turns	Bianca Marquez Walsh	Series regular
1989	Gideon Oliver	Tiffany	Episode: "Sleep Well, Professor Oliver"
1991, 1998	Law & Order	Revina / Candy Pacheco	2 episodes
1993	Blind Spot	Ramona	TV movie
1995	Friends At Last	Ramona	TV movie
1996	New York Undercover	Tika Santiago	Episode: "A Time to Kill"
1997	413 Hope St.	Yolanda	Episode: "Pilot"
1997	The Practice	Teresa Cortez	Episode: "Save the Mule"
1998	Brooklyn South	Lola	Episode: "Queens for a Day"
1998, 2004	NYPD Blue	Theresa Ocasio / Tanya Taylor	2 episodes
1999	Chicago Hope	Sally Barnes	Episode: "The Golden Hour"
2000	Missing Pieces	Maria	TV movie
2000	Judging Amy	Martina Romano	Episode: "Drawing the Line"
2000	Touched by an Angel	Annie Higuerra	Episode: "The Invitation"
2001	Strong Medicine	Alicia Perez	Episode: "Maternity"
2001	Family Law	Sandra Ramirez	Episode: "No Options"
2001–2002	24	Jamey Farrell	Recurring role (Season 1)
2003	Without a Trace	Luisa Delgado	Episode: "A Tree Falls"
2015	Blue Bloods	Carmen Thompson	Episode: "Love Stories"
2015	The Mysteries of Laura	Housekeeper	Episode: "The Mystery of the Locked Box"
2016	Bull	Lurla Gray	Episode: "Never Saw the Sign"
2017	Criminal Minds: Beyond Borders	Rosa Fernandez	Episode: "The Devil's Breath"
2018	Law & Order: Special Victims Unit	Sylvia Ramos	Episode: "Chasing Demons"
2019	Orange is the New Black	Karla Córdova	6 episodes
2021-2022	The Blacklist	Mierce Xiu	8 episodes
2023	A Murder at the End of the World	Marta	Episodes: "Chapter 2: The Silver Doe" and "Chapter 3: Survivors"
2024	FBI: Most Wanted	Maria Alvarez	Episode: "Footsteps"
