= The Changed =

- Directed by: Michael Mongillo
- Written by: Michael Mongillo; Matt Giannini
- Starring: Tony Todd
- Distributed by: Quiver Distribution
- Release dates: August 27, 2021 (FrightFest); March 4, 2022 (United States)
- Running time: 80 minutes
- Country: United States
- Language: English

The Changed is a 2021 American science fiction thriller film directed by Michael Mongillo and starring Tony Todd. The plot centers around a group of ordinary people that band together in a suburban home to battle imposters who have replaced their families, friends, and neighbors.

The Changed premiered at the 2021 London FrightFest Film Festival, and was released in the United States on March 4, 2022, by Quiver Distribution.

== Plot ==
The film opens with Jane lying in bed experiencing flashes in a nightmare. As she wakes, she is disturbed and confused by what she has seen. Outside, Mac shares coffee with their neighbor, Bill, and expresses his concern with the demeanor of everyone around them. During the conversation Bill jokingly attempts to kiss Mac. As Mac shakes it off, Bill reassures him that everything is okay and that Mac is being paranoid. Back inside, Mac comforts Jane and they agree they are being paranoid.

At a local high school, 17-year-old Kim feels isolated from her friends. While at work at the hospital, Jane's supervisor Ethan corners her and attempts to kiss her. Back in the neighborhood, Mac is approached by a jogger, Sara, who openly flirts with and offers to sleep with him. Kim walks up as Sara jogs away. Mac and Kim chat about how everyone is acting odd. We hear an air-raid siren; Mac and Kim take refuge inside Mac and Jane's home.

Mac and Kim listen to an emergency radio broadcast, telling them that, contrary to previous advice to stay inside, everyone should now report to the nearest public school or emergency shelter. Jane returns home from the hospital and Mac and Kim greet her outside. Jane tells Mac that Ethan attacked her. Bill knocks on the door to return a power saw. Returning to their earlier conversation, Bill continues to reassure them everything is going to be okay and then pushes in the door, attacking Mac. A fight ensures and ends when Jane grabs a shotgun.

Tied up and interrogated in the basement, Bill explains to everyone that giving over to whoever they are means letting go of everything negative about being a human, embracing bliss. Unconvinced, they leave Bill tied up. There's a knock at the door, and the visitor is revealed to be Kim's uncle, Kurt. Mac tries to explain everything to Kurt, who doesn't believe what he's hearing. When Kurt sees Bill tied up, he, Mac, and Jane debate the morals of holding Bill against his will.

Kurt eventually leaves the house and is surrounded by the neighbors and kissed by Sara, changing him. During a struggle in the basement, Jane is shot as she is kissed by Bill. Feeling the effects and starting to change, Jane explains to Mac everything that she is feeling, trying to convince him the change is worth it. Kim and Mac's phones get a text to turn on the TV. News anchor Kathy Walters repeats the narrative that everything is going to be okay and everyone just needs to give in. It's revealed that the changed are an alien species.

Surrounded and desperate, Mac and Kim decide to take up arms and rush the crowd at the front door, leaving their fates unknown.

== Cast ==
- Tony Todd as Bill
- Jason Alan Smith as Mac
- Clare Foley as Kim
- Eric Bloomquist as Marc
- Carlee Avers as Jane
- Doug Tompos as Kurt
- Kathy Searle as Kathy Walters
- Ryan Berry McCarthy as Ethan

== Release ==
The film premiered at the London FrightFest Film Festival on August 27, 2021. It was released in the United States in select theaters and on video on demand on March 4, 2022, by Quiver Distribution.

== Reception ==
On the review aggregator website Rotten Tomatoes, 82% of 11 critics' reviews are positive, with an average rating of 6.7/10.

Bobby LePire of Film Threat rated the film a 9.5 out of 10 and wrote, "The Changed is telling a story that has been told before. But, the writers have managed to create something compelling and different, thanks to the themes and excellent characterizations."

David Gelmini of Dread Central awarded the film four stars out of five and wrote, "With a substantial performance from Tony Todd and a script which dares to ask tough questions, The Changed is a bold and intriguing horror film which fans should immediately place on their watch list."

Martin Unsworth of Starburst gave the film a negative review and wrote, "The biggest problem with The Changed is the dialogue is so contrived that it loses all sense of drama and descends into parody."
