= Diane (2017 film) =

American supernatural thriller film

- Directed by: Michael Mongillo
- Written by: Michael Mongillo
- Produced by: Davis Mikaels; Michael Mongillo; Thomas Edward Seymour; Taylor Warren
- Starring: Carlee Avers; Jason Alan Smith; Maggie Champagne
- Cinematography: Jason Alan Smith
- Edited by: Michael Mongillo; Taylor Warren; Jeff Reilly
- Music by: Austin Wintory
- Production company: Mean Time Productions
- Distributed by: Random Media
- Release date: September 17, 2018
- Running time: 82 minutes
- Country: United States
- Language: English

Diane is a 2017 American supernatural thriller drama directed by Michael Mongillo, who also produced the film and wrote the film's screenplay. The film stars Jason Alan Smith, Carlee Avers, Margaret Rose Champagne, and Dick Boland. It was produced by Mean Time Productions and distributed by Random Media.

The film premiered in London at the London FrightFest Film Festival on August 26, 2017. It was nominated for the 2018 Rondo Hatton Classic Horror Award for Best Independent Film.

== Plot ==
Steve is a wounded Afghanistan War veteran who has PTSD, walks with a limp, and lives a dull, lonely life. One day, he finds the dead body of a young woman murdered with a screwdriver in his backyard. Struck by her beauty, he takes a photo of the corpse before reporting it to the authorities. Steve learns that the corpse belongs to Diane, a local singer.

He becomes the prime suspect in the investigation of her murder and is harassed by police and local townspeople who believe he is guilty. Steve becomes obsessed with Diane's image and also begins experiencing strange visions of Diane. He is visited by Diane's widower, who believes she was having an affair with him.

Steve finds himself getting stronger after his visions of Diane. Eventually, he is able to walk without a cane and is strong enough to fight his harassers in town. It is revealed that Steve and Diane were having an affair and he is being haunted by her spirit. Steve faces Diane's spirit in a final confrontation.

== Cast ==
- Jason Alan Smith as Steve
- Carlee Avers as Diane
- Dick Boland as Detective Bernard
- Margaret Rose Champagne as Detective Phillips
- Jim Thalman as Sergeant Winslow
- Davis Mikaels as Lenny
- Ryan Barry McCarthy as Mal
- Doug Tompos as Markus
- Kathy Searle as Sally
- Sewell Whitney as Skip

== Release and distribution ==
The film premiered at London FrightFest 2017. It had its United States premiere at the New York City Horror Film Festival before having a limited theatrical run in 2018, released in theaters on September 7.

The film was released on video on demand on September 17, 2018.

== Reception ==
On the review aggregator website Rotten Tomatoes, the film holds an approval rating of 88% with an average rating of 7.3/10 based on 8 reviews.

Frank Schek of The Hollywood Reporter gave the film a positive review, calling it "atmospheric and intriguing". Noel Murray of the Los Angeles Times wrote a more mixed review, praising the film's "strong performances and some memorably dramatic moments", but criticizing the film for lacking focus.
