= My Man Is a Loser =

- Theatrical release poster
- Directed by: Mike Young
- Written by: Mike Young
- Produced by: David Goldin; Eric Bamberger; Vince P. Maggio; Dale Resteghini
- Starring: Michael Rapaport; Bryan Callen; Tika Sumpter; John Stamos
- Cinematography: Harlan Bosmajian
- Edited by: Phyllis Housen
- Music by: Cass Dillon; Brian H. Kim
- Production companies: Step One Of Many Entertainment; Imprint Entertainment
- Distributed by: Lionsgate
- Release date: July 25, 2014
- Running time: 95 minutes
- Country: United States
- Language: English

My Man Is a Loser is a 2014 American comedy film written and directed by comedian Mike Young. Filming began in New York City in June 2012. The film received a video on demand and limited theatrical release on July 25, 2014, by Lionsgate Films.

== Synopsis ==
The film follows two married friends, Marty (Michael Rapaport) and Paul (Bryan Callen), who hire their single playboy friend Mike (John Stamos) to "help them get their mojo back" in order to save their marriages. Their plan backfires, leaving their wives unimpressed with their new personalities.

== Cast ==
- John Stamos as Mike, a "raunchy playboy". Stamos joined the film in June 2012. According to producer Eric Bamberger, Stamos was cast as a 40-something "ultimate playboy".
- Michael Rapaport as Marty and Bryan Callen as Paul, two friends trying to save their marriages.
- Tika Sumpter as Clarissa, Mike's bartender
- Kathy Searle as Lianne
- Heidi Armbuster as Liz

== Promotion ==
Step One of Many Entertainment plans a heavily digitally-media-oriented promotion strategy for the film, focused on Twitter and Facebook. The company states that it expects My Man Is a Loser to be "the heaviest digitally promoted Independent film to date".
