= John D'Leo =

American actor (born 1995)

- Born: July 8, 1995 (age 31); Monmouth County, New Jersey, U.S
- Occupation: Actor
- Years active: 2007–present

John D'Leo (born July 8, 1995) is an American actor known for his role in the 2013 film The Family, as well as the films Cop Out (2010), Brooklyn's Finest (2010), Wanderlust (2012) and Unbroken (2014). He has also starred in the television series Law & Order: Special Victims Unit and How to Make It in America.

== Early life ==
D'Leo was born on July 8, 1995, in Monmouth County, New Jersey, to parents Ginna and Chuck D'Leo. He is of Italian and Irish descent.

=== Acting career ===
D'Leo started his career acting in commercials, and later started acting in television and films. His first main role was in the 2008 film The Wrestler.

He later went on to become known for his role in the 2013 film The Family, alongside Robert De Niro, Michelle Pfeiffer, Tommy Lee Jones, and Dianna Agron.

== Filmography ==
=== Film ===
Year	Title	Role	Notes
2008	The Wrestler	Adam	
2009	Brooklyn's Finest	Vinny	
2010	Cop Out	Kevin	
2011	Dirty Movie	Vienna Sausage Boy	
2012	Wanderlust	Tanner Gergenblatt	
2012	Murt Ramirez Wants to Kick My Ass	Billy	
2013	The Family	Warren Blake	
2014	Unbroken	Young Pete	
2015	Jack of the Red Hearts	Dudley	
2016	Charlie Keats	Bully 1	Short
2017	Lost Cat Corona	Teenage Dom	

=== Television ===
Year	Title	Role	Notes
2007	Law & Order: Special Victims Unit	Drew Royce	1 episode: "Annihilated"
2007	Guiding Light	Snake Boy	1 episode: "#1.15315"
2008	Life on Mars	Robbie Reeves	1 episode: "My Maharishi Is Bigger Than Your Maharishi"
2009	The Unusuals	Boy	1 episode: "The Tape Delay"
2010	How to Make It in America	Apartment Brother	1 episode: "Unhappy Birthday"
2010	Mercy	Jonah	1 episode: "That Crazy Bitch Was Right"
2015	Orange Is the New Black	1978 Joey Caputo	1 episode: "We Can Be Heroes"
2017	Blue Bloods	Tommy 'Shadow' O'Rourke	1 episode: "In & Out"
2018	The Crossing	Will	Main role
2018	Paterno	Riot Interviewee	TV movie
