= Roger Hendricks Simon =

American actor and director

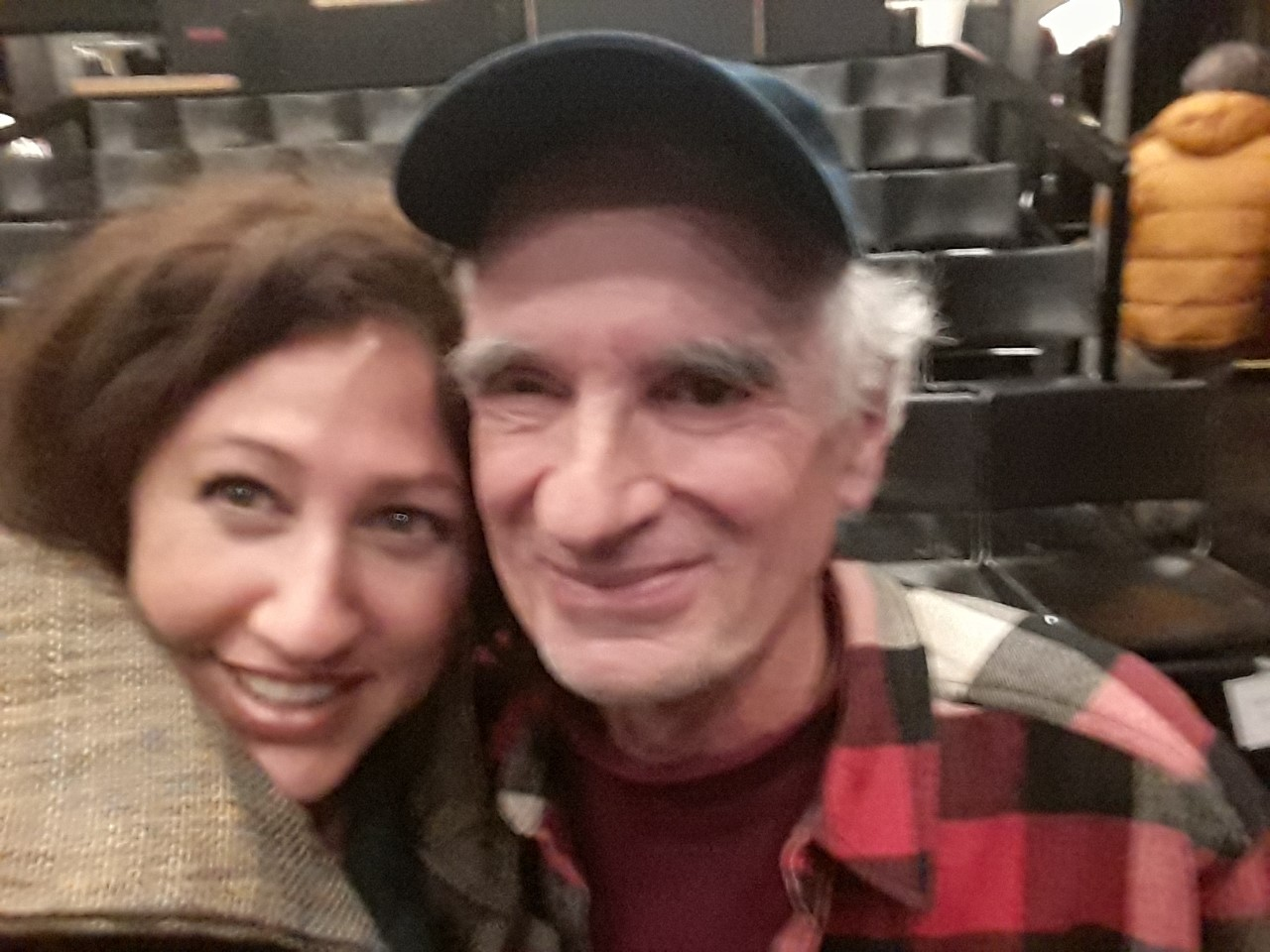
- Born: October 21, 1942 (age 82); New York City, U.S.
- Education: Yale University
- Occupation(s): Actor, producer and theater director
- Spouse: Sarah Simon (died 2017)
- Children: Noah, Daniel, Abigail

Roger Hendricks Simon (born October 21, 1942) is an American theater and film actor, producer, and director. He is best known for his roles as Bernie Jacobs in Wall Street: Money Never Sleeps and Fergal O'Reilly in Love in Kilnerry and Mac in Linoleum (opposite Jim Gaffigan, Tony Shalhoub and Rhea Seehorn). He is a graduate and founding member of Robert Brustein's Yale Repertory Company. Simon went on to direct London's Royal Court Theatre, Dublin's Abbey Theatre, Edinburgh Festival, the Lincoln Center, the Brooklyn Academy of Music, the Roundabout Theater, the Juilliard Opera, the Los Angeles Theatre Center, the Williamstown Theatre Festival, the O'Neill Playwrights Conference, the Folger Shakespeare Group, Metromedia and BBC Television. He is Founding Artistic Director of The Simon Studio in NYC in 1978 and the Founding Artistic Director of L.A. Classical Theatre Lab in 1990, a member and moderator of the Actors Studio Playwrights and Directors Unit in NYC 1991 - 2023 -

== Early life and education ==
He was born in NYC, 1942 and moved to Scarsdale, NY in 1951. His parents are Harold K. Simon and Mildred Koscherak Simon.

Education:

- Scarsdale High School '60
- Middlebury College B.A.'64
- Yale School of Drama, MFA'67

== Career ==
=== Stage ===
Director and actor: Yale Rep (Founding member under Artistic Director Robert Brustein), NY Shakespeare Festival, London's Royal Court Theatre, Dublin's Abbey Theatre, Folger Theatre Group, Great Lakes Shakespeare Festival, L.A. Founding Artistic Director: Theatre Center Classical Theatre Lab, Williamstown Theatre Festival, O'Neill Playwrights Festival, Aspen Playwrights Festival, Colorado Shakespeare Festival, John Drew Theatre (East Hampton, NY), Off Broadway: The Portrait, The Dressmaker's Secret (59E59 Theatres), I Count The Hours: La Mama and Theatre Row, Roundabout Theatre, Now There's Just the Three of Us: Chelsea Theatre Center at BAM, Benya the King: Jewish Rep Co., Love, Sex and Real Estate: The Chain Theatre - American Renaissance Theater Co.

=== Film and TV ===
Film Actor: co star: The Sublet, co star: Love in Kilnerry (winner of International Independent Film's Best Supporting Actor), Linoleum (featured opposite Jim Gaffigan, Tony Shalhoub and Rhea Seehorn), Another Year Together, Can't Let It Go, actor and producer: Jimmy's Cafe (Newport Beach Film Festival selection). Creative Producer/actor: The Boys of Late Summer (Newport Beach Film Festival selection)

== Theatre credits ==
Stage (partial)
Year	Play	Author	Role	Location	Notes

== Filmography ==
Film
Release date	Title	Role	Director	Notes
2022	Linoleum (film)	Mac	Colin West	

== Awards and nominations ==
Year	Award	Category	Role	Work	Result
2020	International Independent Film Awards	Best Supporting Actor	Fergal O'Reilly	Love in Kilnerry	Won
