= Tonino Benacquista =

French writer, comics writer, and screenwriter

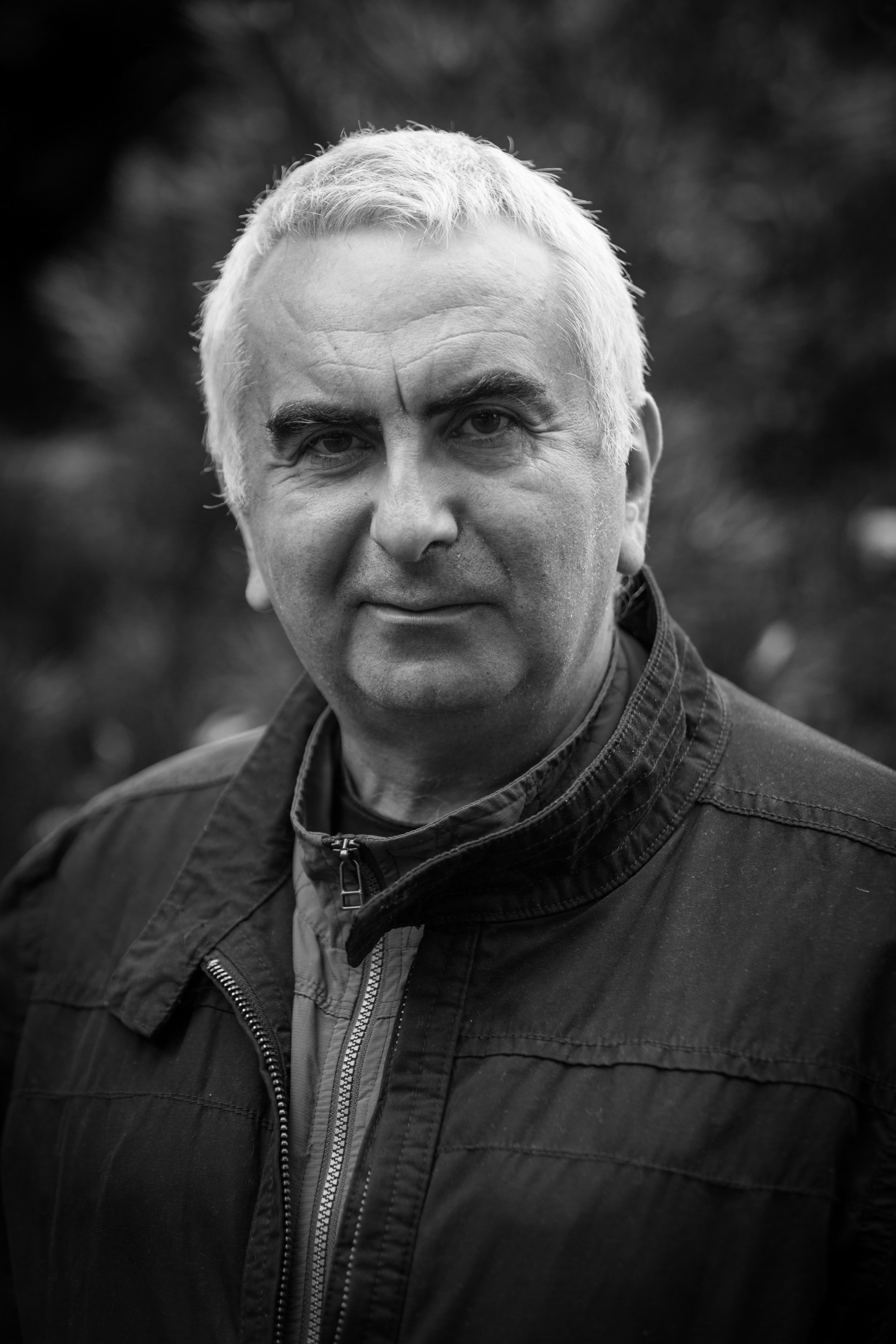
- Tonino Benacquista in 2015 by Claude Truong-Ngoc

Tonino Benacquista (born in Choisy-le-Roi on 1 September 1961) is a French crime fiction author, comics writer, and screenwriter. He wrote the novel Malavita (as Badfellas for the 2010 English translation), which was later adapted into a film by Relativity Media and EuropaCorp titled The Family, released on 13 September 2013 in North America. The novel Malavita was republished as The Family for a movie tie-in by Penguin Random House in 2013.

== Novels ==
- Saga [fr], Éditions Gallimard, 1997
- Quelqu'un d'autre, Éditions Gallimard, 2001
- Malavita [fr], Éditions Gallimard, 2004
- Malavita encore, Éditions Gallimard, 2008
- Homo erectus, Éditions Gallimard, 2011
- Romanesque, Éditions Gallimard, 2016
- Toutes les histoires d'amour ont été racontées, sauf une, Éditions Gallimard, 2020
- Porca miseria, Éditions Gallimard, 2022
- Tiré de faits irréels, Éditions Gallimard, 2025

== Awards ==
- 1992 Grand Prix de Littérature Policière for La Commedia des ratés
- 1998 Angoulême International Comics Festival René Goscinny award for L'Outremangeur; Grand prix des lectrices de Elle for Saga, Éditions Gallimard
- 2001 César Award for Best Original Screenplay or Adaptation for Sur mes lèvres, shared with Jacques Audiard
- 2005 César Award for Best Adaptation, for The Beat That My Heart Skipped, shared with Jacques Audiard
