= Being Michael Madsen =

- Directed by: Michael Mongillo
- Written by: James Charbonneau; Michael Mongillo; David Wexler
- Produced by: Daniel A. Sherkow
- Starring: Michael Madsen; Jason Alan Smith; Doug Tompos; Kathy Searle
- Cinematography: Jeff Hoyt
- Edited by: Michael Mongillo; Taylor Warren
- Music by: Christopher Klatman
- Release date: September 28, 2007 (Raindance Film Festival)
- Country: United States
- Language: English

Being Michael Madsen is a 2007 comedy film directed by Michael Mongillo and produced by Daniel A. Sherkow. The film takes a mockumentary approach in re-imagining actor Michael Madsen as a paparazzi-hounded movie star who hatches a revenge scheme against a tabloid journalist. The film co-stars Virginia Madsen, David Carradine, Harry Dean Stanton, Daryl Hannah, Lacey Chabert, and Debbie Rochon.

The film received a 5/5 Film Threat review, as well as positive press from the likes of Variety and BoxOffice. Two years after its international release, it was handpicked as part of Warsaw’s New Horizons Film Festival mockumentary retrospective along with the landmark films This is Spinal Tap and Man Bites Dog.

Shortly after Madsen’s death in July 2025, The Telegraph named Being Michael Madsen one of Madsen’s five greatest performances, alongside Reservoir Dogs, Species, Thelma & Louise, and the Kill Bill movies.

Inspired by classes he took with Steppenwolf co-founder John Malkovich, Madsen suggested the mockumentary’s title, a reference to the 1999 film, Being John Malkovich. The original screenplay was titled Turning the Tables.
