= Where's Rose =

2021 film by John Mathis

- Official release poster
- Directed by: John Mathis
- Written by: John Mathis
- Produced by: John Mathis; Ty Simpkins; Jared Sprouse; Justin Boswick; Pablo Bobadilla
- Starring: Ty Simpkins; Skyler Elyse Philpot; Anneliese Judge; Kathy Searle; Nick Basta; Joseph Gray
- Cinematography: Eric Gesualdo
- Edited by: Barrett Jay
- Music by: Jason Obermeier
- Production companies: Nonlinear Studios; Bobadilla Productions; Barnegat Studios
- Distributed by: TriCoast Worldwide
- Release dates: 1 November 2021 (Raindance Film Festival); 29 July 2022
- Running time: 83 minutes
- Country: United States
- Language: English
- Box office: $21,720

Where's Rose is a 2021 American folk horror thriller film directed by John Mathis, starring Ty Simpkins, Skyler Elyse Philpot, Anneliese Judge, Kathy Searle, Nick Basta and Joseph Gray.

== Cast ==
- Ty Simpkins as Eric Daniels
- Skyler Elyse Philpot as Rose Daniels
- Anneliese Judge as Jessica Waters
- Kathy Searle as Mary Daniels
- Nick Basta as Nate Daniels
- Joseph Gray as Dan Waters

== Release ==
The film was released in theatres on 29 July 2022, and was released to VOD on 30 August.

=== Box office ===
As of November 29, 2023, Where's Rose grossed $21,720 in Russia.

== Reception ==
David Gelmini of Dread Central rated the film 4 stars out of 5, calling it "a haunting and challenging viewing experience which will make you wish your loved ones will never return after they get lost in the woods."

Paul Risker of PopMatters gave the film a rating of 6/10. Rich Cross of Starburst rated the film 2 stars out of 5, writing that "The closing scenes of Where's Rose do deliver some powerful revelations. Yet there's a nastiness to those narrative twists that feel out of kilter with the film's otherwise bland tone, while the muddled folklore falls flat."
