= Love in Kilnerry =

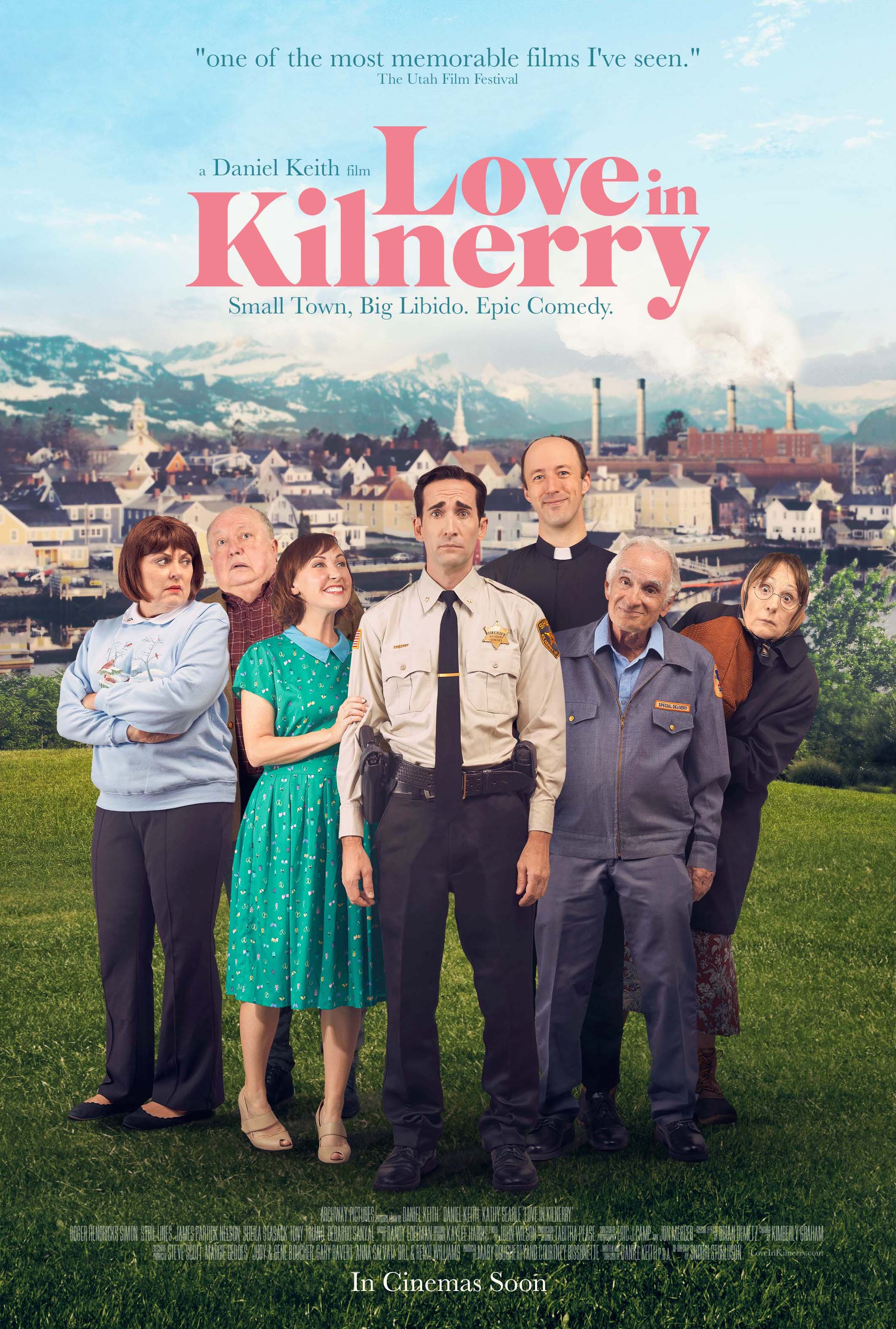
- Official Movie Poster
- Directed by: Daniel Keith
- Written by: Daniel Keith
- Produced by: Daniel Keith, Courtney Bissonette, Mary Dougherty
- Starring: Daniel Keith, Kathy Searle, Roger Hendricks Simon, James Patrick Nelson, Sybil Lines, Sheila Stasack, Tony Triano
- Cinematography: J. Eric Camp, Jon Mercer
- Edited by: John Wilson
- Music by: Randy Edelman
- Production company: Archway Pictures
- Distributed by: Archway Pictures (worldwide)
- Release date: April 8, 2022
- Running time: 105 minutes
- Country: United States
- Language: English
- Budget: $1.2 million
- Box office: $213,099

Love in Kilnerry is a 2022 American romantic comedy film written, produced, and directed by Daniel Keith in his directorial debut. The film stars Keith, Kathy Searle, Roger Hendricks Simon, James Patrick Nelson, Sybil Lines, Sheila Stasack, and Tony Triano. The first draft edit of the film played to peers in the US on October 18, 2019, at the New Hampshire Film Festival and the San Diego International Film Festival simultaneously. The film went through two more years of edits and reshoots before being completed in 2021. Archway Pictures released the film theatrically in North America in limited cities starting April 8 and a wide release on May 13, 2022.

The comedy's narrative is focused on the fictional town of Kilnerry, New Hampshire, whose residents panic after the Environmental Protection Agency informs them that mandatory changes to their chemical plant could dramatically increase their sexual libido.

== Plot ==
The small sleepy remote town of Kilnerry struggles as most of the residents are elderly and the younger ones will be going off to college soon. When a representative from the EPA visits the town's quarterly townhall meeting to tell them their chemical plant has been polluting the waters and creating toxic fish, they learn a new mandatory process, called P172, must be adapted by the plant. However, there is one small side effect. When exposed to P172, laboratory rats have shown a dramatic increase in sexual libido. The residents panic and chaos ensues. The sheriff struggles to maintain order over the following months as chaos and mayhem ensue; a catastrophic orgy attempt, indecent exposure, the priest becomes a nudist to be closer to God, and some of the more decrepit residents compete in a dance competition with a risqué performance. Just as the sheriff has reached his breaking point in an effort to control everyone and keep the town from changing, the EPA returns to inform them that they discovered the rats had been used in a previous pheromone test and that P172 has no side effects. Plagued with guilt, they realize that by thinking they had no control, they learned to open up, accept others, throw caution to the wind and live again, and fall in love. The sheriff is faced with his actions and apologizes to the town. The residents go on to embrace a new life and create new destinies.

== Cast ==
- Daniel Keith as Gary O'Reilly, the town sheriff
- Kathy Searle as Nessa Ward, the corky paper shop owner
- Roger Hendricks Simon as Fergal O'Reilly, the town postman
- James Patrick Nelson as Father Wesley O'Dell
- Debargo Sanyal as Rakesh Nibhanupudi, a spokesperson from the Environmental Protection Agency
- Tony Triano as Jerry Boylan, the town mayor and pub owner
- Sybil Lines as Aednat McLaughlin, a religious reclusive widow
- Sheila Stasack as Brigid Kerry, the town gossip and general store owner

== Production and distribution ==
=== Development ===
Love in Kilnerry was originally a play, written by Keith, that takes place in the fictional town of Kilnerry in County Donegal. It was a challenge presented to him by Royal Shakespeare Company alumnus Sybil Lines (who went on to play Aednat McLaughlin). Keith wanted to write something that would make his grandmother laugh. He used a pen name, Colin Filmore, so the actors could approach the material more honestly as to not be intimidated by the writer present. The play was workshopped in front of audiences at Manhattan Theater Club Studios in New York City for most of 2016. It wasn't until 2017, when Keith wrote the story as a screenplay, that the cast learned who the real writer was. Keith traveled up and down the east coast looking at dozens of small towns until he found a postcard of Portsmouth. Upon visiting the small seaside town, Keith knew he had found "[his] Kilnerry". Daniel Keith, Roger Hendricks Simon, Sybil Lines, and Sheila Stasack, who had workshopped the play in 2016, continued on to the film. Keith requested that all the cast were theater actors since he wanted the film to have a theater-esque and storybook look and feel about it.

=== Filming ===
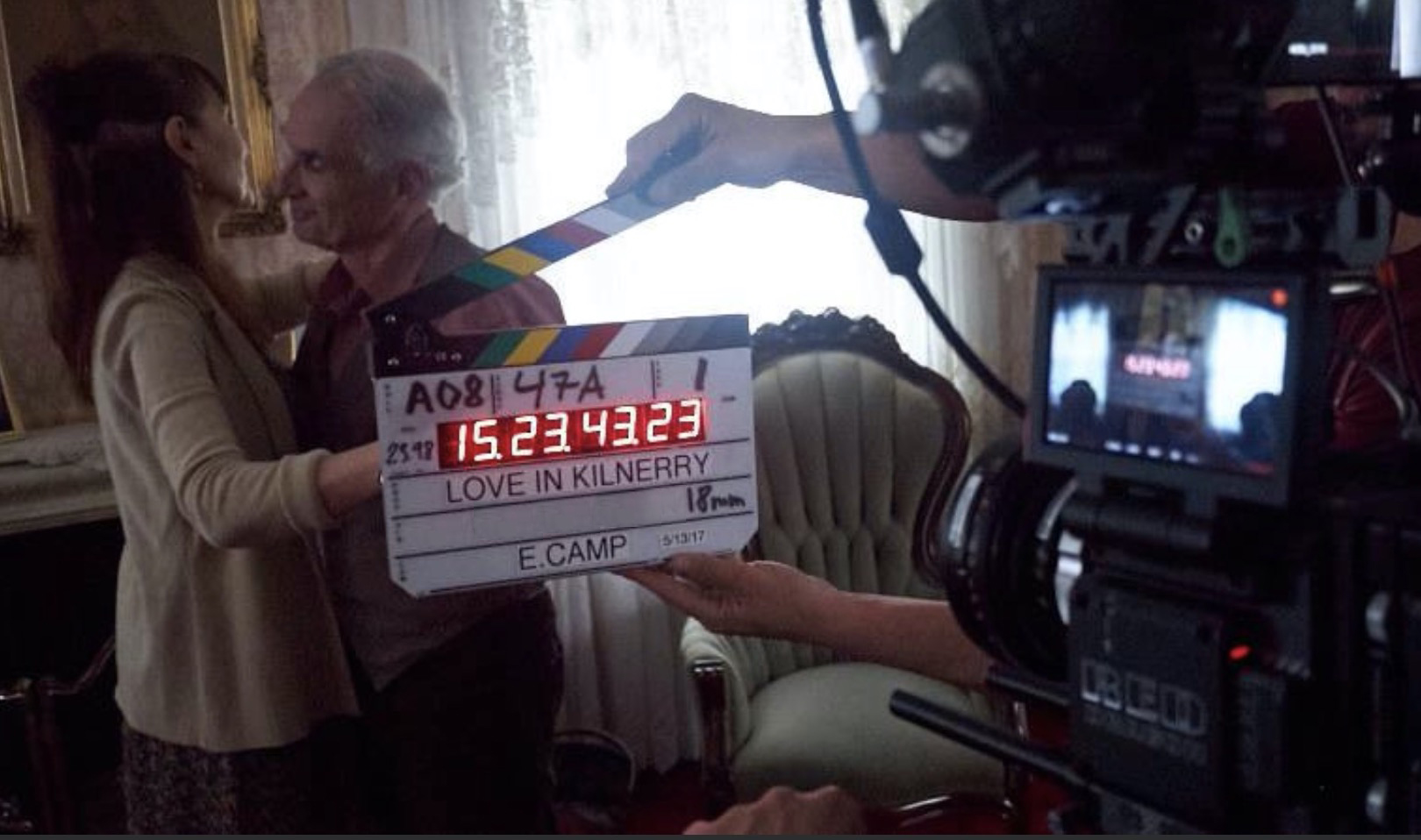
Sybil Lines (Aednat) and Roger Hendricks Simon (Fergal)

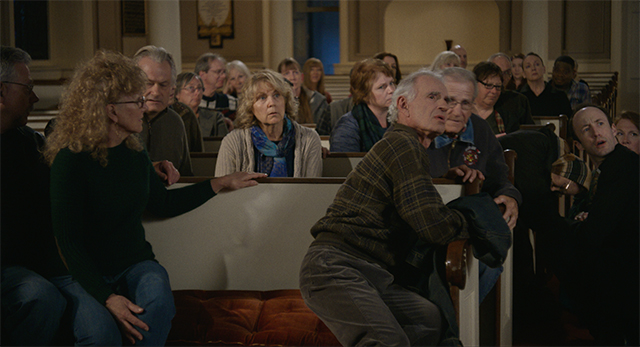
Love in Kilnerry screenshot

Keith knew he wanted a storybook town that was cut off from the rest of the world, so he reached out to visual effects artist Brian Demetz to create mountains around the town and erase anything modern (e.g. jeans, construction, tattoos, iPhones, new cars). The establishing and drone shots were the first to be filmed. Many of the residents of Portsmouth became the residents of Kilnerry, and brought the members of the production food, helped them find locations, and even housed many of them. A cast and crew of 200 people filmed in 28 locations. The Irish Post caught wind of Keith's film and released a story on December 15, 2017, about the Irish town of Ringaskiddy in County Cork, whose residents were complaining about the fumes of the local Pfizer plant, which made Viagra, and was causing the men and dogs to walk around sexually excited. The article said that "art could be imitating life".

=== Post-production ===
Post-production took place throughout 2018. Keith sought Jon Wilson to edit the film at Pinewood Studios in London, the music was written and performed by the score composer Randy Edelman, visual FX were created by Brian DeMetz, and the film was colored by Andrew Geary at Company 3. Early edits of the film were shown to audiences at film festivals throughout 2019. These early edits gained international awards and nominations, with awards including Best Original Screenplay from the San Diego International Film Festival and Best Comedy from the Manhattan Film Festival.

=== Distribution ===
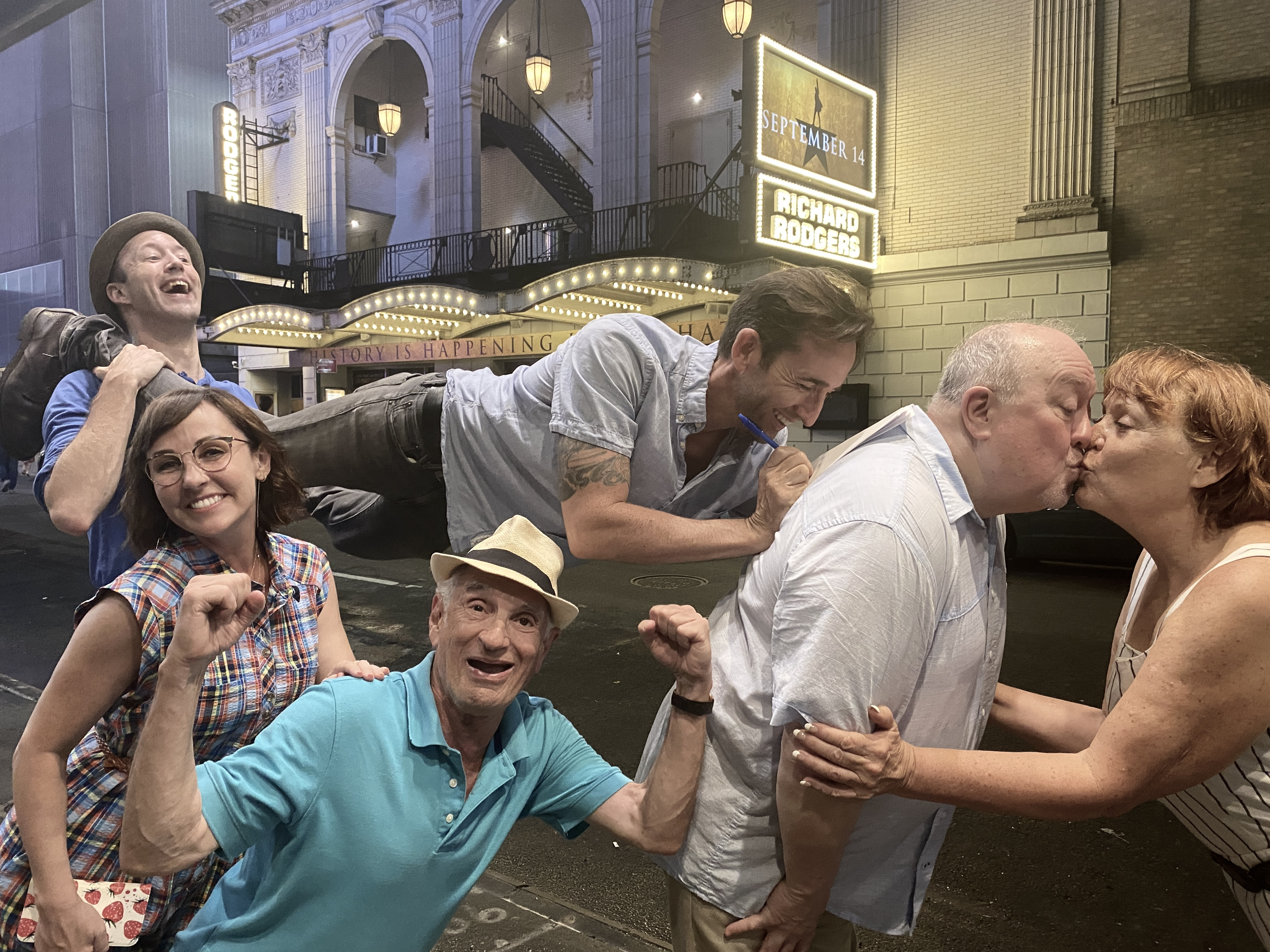
Cast of Love in Kilnerry sign North American distribution deal with Mutiny Pictures.

The global COVID-19 pandemic halted the industry in April 2020 and it wasn't until July 2021 that Mutiny Pictures acquired North American distribution rights with the intention of putting the movie in theaters nationwide in early 2022. In 2022, Daniel Keith's company, Archway Pictures, took over theatrical distribution from Mutiny Pictures.

=== Portsmouth, New Hampshire Early Release ===
As a way of thanking the residents of Portsmouth, New Hampshire, Archway Pictures released the film early for one day only on April 9, 2022. Mayor Deaglan McEachern signed a proclamation renaming Portsmouth on April 9 of every year and declaring every April 9 "Kilnerry Day". The businesses in the downtown Market Square changed their names and Portsmouth Brewery created the Kilnerry Ale. The executive producer, and local resident of Portsmouth, Steve Scott, told the Foster's Daily Democrat, "The folks from the film usually come into a community (and hear) 'They're blocking my streets with actors again making a quick buck.' Here they were greeted with open arms."

== Accolades ==
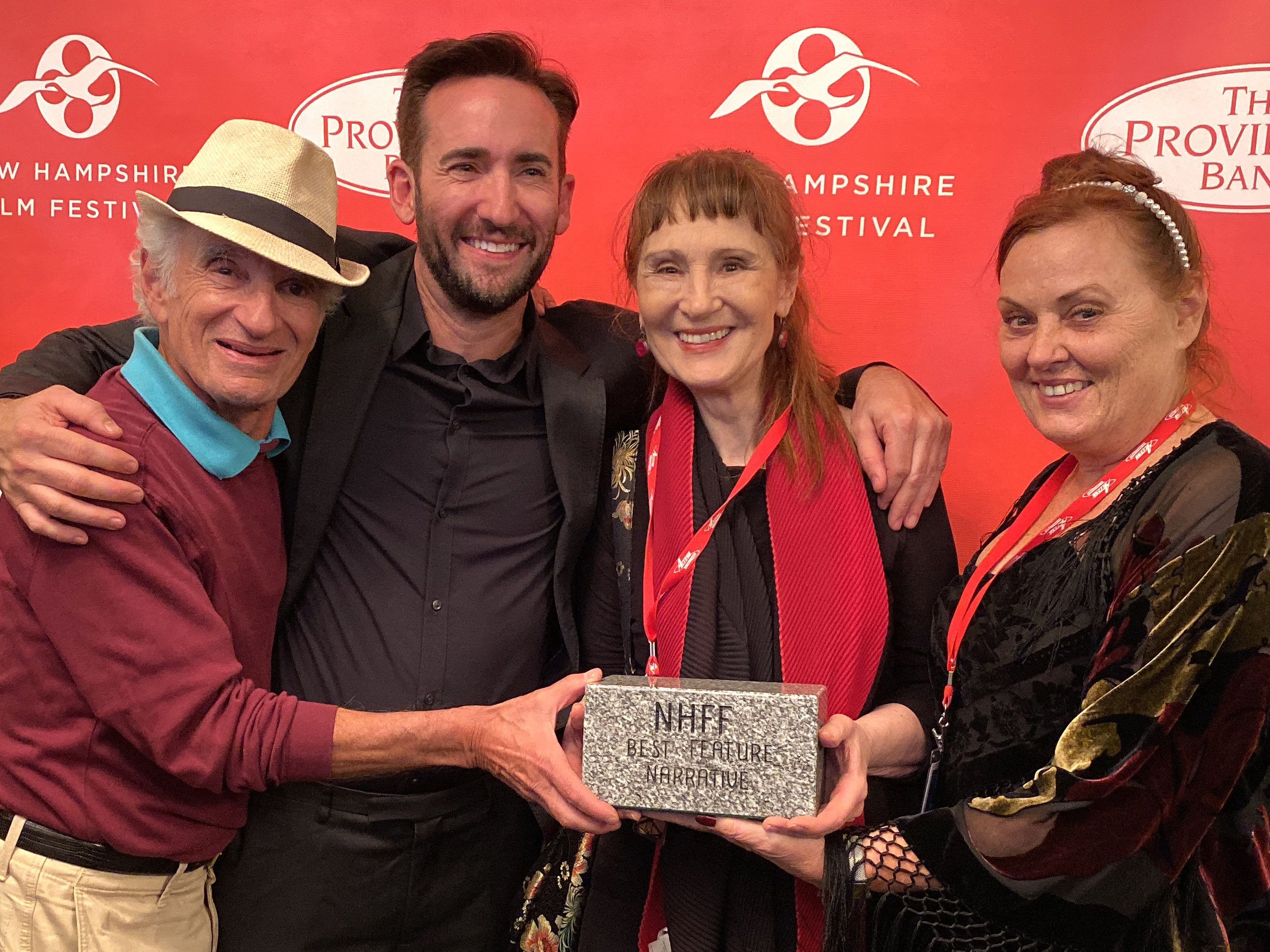
Roger Hendricks Simon, Daniel Keith, Sybil Lines, Sheila Stasack - New Hampshire Film festival 2019

Note: These accolades were awarded to early edits of the film.

Award	Date of ceremony	Category	Recipient(s)	Result	Ref.
Hollywood Screenplay Contest	2017	Best Screenplay - Silver Prize	Daniel Keith	Won	
SoHo International Film Festival	2019	Audience Award	Archway Pictures	Nominated	
SoHo International Film Festival	2019	Grand Jury Award	Archway Pictures	Nominated	
New Hampshire Film Festival	2019	Best NH Narrative Feature	Archway Pictures	Won	
New Hampshire Film Festival	2019	Audience Choice - Feature	Archway Pictures	Nominated	
San Diego International Film Festival	2019	Best Original Screenplay	Daniel Keith	Won	
San Diego International Film Festival	2019	First Time Director	Daniel Keith	Nominated	
San Diego International Film Festival	2019	Best Comedy	Daniel Keith/Kathy Searle	Nominated	
Madrid International Film Festival	2019	Best Director	Daniel Keith	Nominated	
Madrid International Film Festival	2019	Best Comedy	Archway Pictures	Nominated	
Madrid International Film Festival	2019	Best Lead Actress	Kathy Searle	Won	
Manhattan Film Festival	2019	Best comedy	Archway Pictures	Won	
Calcutta International Cult Film Festival	2019	Best Screenplay - Golden Fox Award	Daniel Keith	Nominated	
Jersey Shore Film Festival	2019	Best Director	Daniel Keith	Won	
Jersey Shore Film Festival	2019	Best Actress	Kathy Searle	Won	
Around The World Film Festival	2020	Best Director	Daniel Keith	Nominated	
Around The World Film Festival	2020	Best Cinematography	Eric Camp, Jon Mercer	Nominated	
Around The World Film Festival	2020	Best Film	Archway Pictures	Nominated	
