= The Family (2013 film) =

2013 film by Luc Besson

- Theatrical release poster
- Directed by: Luc Besson
- Screenplay by: Luc Besson; Michael Caleo
- Based on: Malavita by Tonino Benacquista
- Produced by: Ryan Kavanaugh; Virginie Silla
- Starring: Robert De Niro; Michelle Pfeiffer; Tommy Lee Jones; Dianna Agron; John D'Leo
- Cinematography: Thierry Arbogast
- Edited by: Julien Rey
- Music by: Evgueni Galperine; Sacha Galperine
- Production companies: EuropaCorp; Relativity Media; TF1 Films Production; Grive Productions
- Distributed by: EuropaCorp Distribution (France); Relativity Media (United States)
- Release dates: 10 September 2013 (New York City); 13 September 2013 (United States); 23 October 2013 (France)
- Running time: 111 minutes
- Countries: France; United States
- Language: English
- Budget: $30 million
- Box office: $78.4 million

The Family (released as Malavita and Cosa Nostra in some countries) is a 2013 crime thriller film co-written and directed by Luc Besson, starring Robert De Niro, Michelle Pfeiffer, Tommy Lee Jones, Dianna Agron and John D'Leo. A co-production between France and the United States, the film follows a Mafia family in the witness protection program who want to change their lives. It is based on the 2004 novel Malavita (Badfellas in the 2010 English translation) by French author Tonino Benacquista.

== Plot ==
Mafia boss Giovanni Manzoni, who offended rival mafia boss Don Luchese, survives an attempted hit on him and his family at a barbecue. He snitches on Luchese, which sends him to prison. Manzoni and his family, including his wife Maggie, son Warren and daughter Belle, enter the FBI witness protection program under the supervision of Agent Robert Stansfield. As a result, they relocate various times, the latest being the village of Cholong-sur-Avre, Normandy.

Adjusting to life in the village, the family is being watched by two FBI agents to ensure their safety. Giovanni claims to be an author writing an historical novel on the Normandy landings, but many locals are more familiar with the event than he is. He finds ways to slip away to discover why the water in his house is brown. He beats a plumber who tries to unnecessarily change all the pipes in his house, and a fertilizer factory owner who is responsible for the tainted water.

Belle falls in love with Henri, a college student working as a substitute math teacher. She asks for private math lessons so that she can spend time with him alone. Maggie often visits the undercover FBI agents, and blows up a grocery store when its owner spews anti-American comments in French to the other customers. She spends time at the church, where she and a priest have an amicable relationship. However, their friendship ends when she confesses their crimes, and he tells her to never return.

On his first day at school, Warren is beaten by a group, but he creates a mini-Mafia within the school. This allows him to beat up his bullies. He inadvertently alerts Don Luchese of their location when he quotes one of the kingpins' sayings in the school paper, which, by chance, makes its way to Luchese.

Belle seduces Henri and loses her virginity to him. Giovanni is asked to attend an American film event due to his supposed historical expertise and brings Agent Stansfield, claiming to want to bond with him. It is actually an alibi for a timed explosive that is rigged to destroy the fertilizer pump causing his brown water. The screening takes a turn when, instead of Some Came Running, which is the scheduled film, they watch Goodfellas instead. Throughout the film, Giovanni expresses a desire to talk about his life as a mobster. The debate after the film prompts him to tell his story to the audience. Feeling the cover has been compromised, Stansfield gives the order to relocate the family again.

Meanwhile, the school detects Warren's activities so that he decides to leave town with a fake passport to establish his own Mafia family in Paris, afraid that the FBI will drop the family's protection. At the train station, he sees seven hitmen arrive and head for town. He returns home to warn his family. Henri breaks up with Belle, which causes her to contemplate suicide, but she stops when she sees the hitmen enter the police station and kill officers. Maggie returns home, finds her children gone, and goes to ask the FBI surveillance team for help. Giovanni returns home and Maggie goes to speak with him, but sees the hitmen. She returns to the FBI safe house across the street.

The hitmen blow up the family's house and kill neighbors who leave their homes to investigate. A gunfight ensues, which involves all family members. Maggie stabs a hitman after he raids the safe house and tries to sexually assault her. Belle kills a hitman who went to look for weapons in his car's trunk. Using weapons from the trunk, she shoots a hitman near the burning house. Warren also gets guns and shoots two hitmen while being given cover fire by Belle. One hitman is killed by the family dog. While chasing Belle, the lead hitman is killed by Stansfield, who runs him over with his car.

The family relocates yet again. Despite innocent townspeople having been slaughtered, Giovanni expresses his happiness at having had the chance to tell his story, saying that it brought the family closer.

== Cast ==
- Robert De Niro as Fred Blake / Giovanni Manzoni, the father
- Michelle Pfeiffer as Maggie Blake / Maggie Manzoni, the mother
- Dianna Agron as Belle Blake / Belle Manzoni, the daughter
- John D'Leo as Warren Blake / Warren Manzoni, the son
- Tommy Lee Jones as Robert Stansfield, the FBI agent
- Jimmy Palumbo as Di Cicco, an FBI agent
- Domenick Lombardozzi as Caputo, an FBI agent
- Stan Carp as Don Luchese, a mafia boss
- Vincent Pastore as Willy "Fat Willy", a mafia Capo
- Jonas Bloquet as André
- Jon Freda as Rocco
- Michael J. Panichelli Jr. as Billy "The Bug"
- Paul Borghese as Albert
- Anthony Desio as Bernie
- Annie Mercier as Madame Arnaud
- Ted Arcidi as Tommy
- David Belle as Mezzo
- Oisín Stack as Henri
- Côme Levin as J.P.
- Victoire Du Bois as pink ribbon girl
- Dominique Serrand as town mayor
- Greg Antonacci as New York Mobster (uncredited)

== Production ==
=== Development ===
EuropaCorp and Relativity Media signed during March 2012 to develop two films, including their distribution. The Family would become the first one, and the second would be Three Days to Kill (2014).

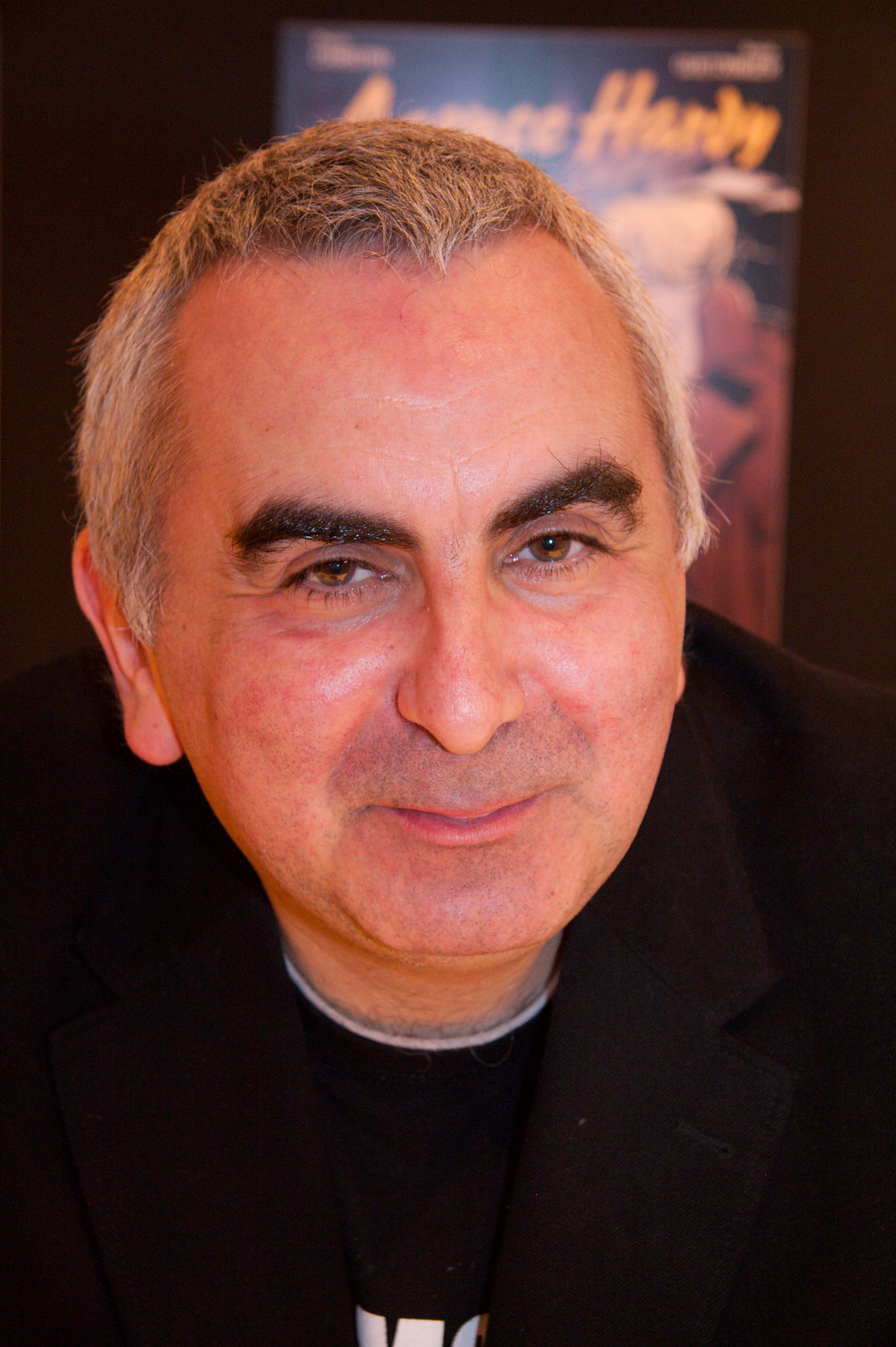
Tonino Benacquista, the author of Malavita.

The script, written by Luc Besson and Michael Caleo, is based on the novel Malavita by Tonino Benacquista, published in 2004. The author did not want to be very involved with the development of the film. He said, "I knew that EuropaCorp would be capable of producing a film that could be distributed, both in the United States and France, and it was a very tempting topic." The producer of the film, Virginie Besson-Silla, said that the film's storyline is nearly the same as the novel's.

Originally, Besson would be only the producer. But after finding out that he was going to work with Robert De Niro and not finding a proper director, he decided to direct the film as well. "I thought that it was out of the question to entrust this project to any other person! I know the American and French cultures, so I decided to make me the director." De Niro asked Besson why he was not the director, and Besson told him, "Okay, you won."

=== Casting ===
The book's author wanted the cast to be "American actors that have their own legend, and when appearing on the big screen, they don't have to convince". When Besson asked him who he wanted to be in the lead role, he proposed Robert De Niro. They sent him a letter, and later De Niro agreed to participate in the project.

In June 2012, it was confirmed that Michelle Pfeiffer would join the cast of The Family, as she was interested in working with De Niro. They had starred together in different films but were never able to film scenes with each other. Author Tonino Benacquista was very pleased with the casting of De Niro and Pfeiffer. Besson later said, "Tonino said it would be so perfect if Robert De Niro and Michelle Pfeiffer played the roles. It was like a dream." Besson always thought of Dianna Agron while writing the character of Belle Blake. Despite this, Agron had to attend multiple auditions. Agron later won the part. The entire Glee cast and crew supported Agron's departure from the show to be part of the film.

A dog named Emeron was chosen to be Malavita, the family's pet dog. Emeron was trained by a specialist, and De Niro was the only person, beside the dog trainer, to spend time with him during the workout. Besson auditioned more than 500 actors for the character of Warren Blake, before casting D'Leo. The Family was De Niro's 96th feature film.

=== Filming ===
Principal photography began on 8 August 2012 and completed on 27 October 2012.

Filming took place in the locations of both Gacé and Le Sap (the old Mairie) in Normandy, and in New York City. Some of the filming also took place L'Aigle and at Cité du Cinéma in Saint-Denis for one month.

=== Title ===
In May 2013, it was revealed that the film, originally titled Malavita, would be retitled The Family in the United States and some English-speaking countries. In some countries, including France, the Malavita title was retained.

== Music ==
The Family (Original Motion Picture Soundtrack)

Soundtrack album by Various Artists
- Released: 13 September 2013
- Length: 39:42
- Label: EuropaCorp
- Producer: Luc Besson

The Family (Original Motion Picture Soundtrack) was released on 13 September 2013, the same day of the film's premiere. It includes original compositions by Evgueni and Sacha Galperine.

No.	Title	Writer(s)	Length
1.	"Gangster Tango"	Evgueni Galperine	1:34
2.	"20 Million Dollars (Interlude Dialogue)"		0:18
3.	"Me and My Baby"	Don Cavalli	2:38
4.	"First Love"	Evgueni Galperine	0:42
5.	"The Body"	Evgueni Galperine	0:49
6.	"Shoot the Dog (Interlude Dialogue)"	Paul Borghese	0:21
7.	"Teens Fight Back"	Evgueni Galperine	1:35
8.	"Once Upon a Time"	Evgueni Galperine	0:54
9.	"Both Arms and Both Legs (Interlude Dialogue)"		0:22
10.	"The Plumber"	Evgueni Galperine	1:01
11.	"Bad Guys in Town"	Evgueni Galperine	3:06
12.	"The Greatest"	Cat Power	3:22
13.	"I Want My Water Crystal Clear"	Evgueni Galperine	1:34
14.	"Best Dad Ever"	Evgueni Galperine	0:55
15.	"The Bomb"	Evgueni Galperine	0:47
16.	"New York, I Love You but You're Bringing Me Down"	LCD Soundsystem	5:35
17.	"Bazooka"	Evgueni Galperine	1:46
18.	"Manzoni the Writer"	Evgueni Galperine	1:10
19.	"I Gave You My Soul"	Evgueni Galperine	1:14
20.	"They Found Us (Interlude Dialogue)"		0:12
21.	"They Are Here"	Evgueni Galperine	1:42
22.	"The Battle"	Evgueni Galperine	2:05
23.	"After the War"	Evgueni Galperine	1:40
24.	"Doce doce"	Fred Bongusto	4:20
25.	"Clint Eastwood"	Gorillaz	4:25

"Clint Eastwood" and "To Binge" by Gorillaz are used in the film but do not appear on the soundtrack album. Another song that does not appear on the album but appears in the film is "Genius of Love" by Tom Tom Club. The song plays in the background during the barbeque scene.

== Release ==
The first trailer of The Family was released on 4 June 2013. For France, the first trailer for Malavita was released in mid-July 2013. In August, some TV spots were released to promote the film. The film was initially set to be released by Relativity Media on 18 October 2013, but changed to 20 September 2013. The film was eventually pushed up to 13 September 2013.

=== Home media ===
The Family was released on DVD and Blu-ray on 17 December 2013.

== Reception ==
=== Critical response ===
On the review aggregator website Rotten Tomatoes, the film holds an approval rating of 28% based on 136 reviews, with an average rating is 4.6/10. The website's critics consensus reads: "Luc Besson's The Family suffers from an overly familiar setup and a number of jarring tonal shifts." Metacritic, which uses a weighted average, assigned the film a score of 42 out of 100, based on 32 critics, indicating "mixed or average" reviews. Audiences polled by CinemaScore gave the film an average grade of "C" on a scale of A+ to F.

Ignatiy Vishnevetsky from The A.V. Club gave the film a B− and said, "Besson creates the impression that The Family is set in a world drawn from gangster movies and comic strips—an idea that culminates in De Niro participating, as the town's token American, in a film club discussion of a certain Martin Scorsese movie."

Stephenie Merry of The Washington Post gave the film one star out of four, stating, "There's little to laugh about in the dark comedy The Family."

Nick Schager of Time Out gave the film one star of five, saying that Besson "treats his protagonists as likable cartoons yet never provides a single reason to view them as anything less than remorseless, repugnant psychos".

MSN Entertainment gave the film three stars out of five, saying, "Sharper, smarter and slicker than it looks, there's a lot to like about The Family."

Linda Barnard from The Toronto Star gave the film two stars out of four, saying, "While Besson knows his way around an action film, he's not as adept at comedy. The result is an often-violent, occasionally amusing fish-out-of-eau tale that plunks a family of wise guys in the French countryside with predictable results."

Mack Rawden of CinemaBlend gave the film three stars out of five, saying, "It uses irregular De Niro voiceovers on occasion. It reads segments of a book on occasion. It even uses bad dreams and flashbacks, all of which, when used together, make the film seem disorganized and poorly put together. All of that, coupled with more than a few jokes that fall flat and a plot that's windy and strangely paced keep The Family from being anything more than a likeable enough way to spend an hour and forty-five minutes."

Stephen Holden of The New York Times summed up the mixed reaction to the film: "The movie has holes galore. It has abrupt tonal shifts, an incoherent back story and abandoned subplots.... But buoyed by hot performances, it sustains a zapping electrical energy."

Although the film did not generate many positive reviews, the cast was praised by critics. THV11 said, "The core actors of The Family were really solid and the whole film comes together to make a solid movie."

The Huffington Post said that "De Niro, Pfeiffer and Jones all brought 100% to their roles. Glee actress Dianna Agron was the stand-out here, shining as the daughter who was falling in love for the first time, while defending her family from total annihilation by the mafia."

The film was nominated for one award: the Women Film Critics Circle Awards Best Young Actress for Agron.

=== Box office ===
The Family debuted at number two in its first weekend, with $14 million, coming in behind Insidious: Chapter 2, which made $40.3 million in its opening weekend.
