= Daniel Keith =

American actor, director, writer, producer

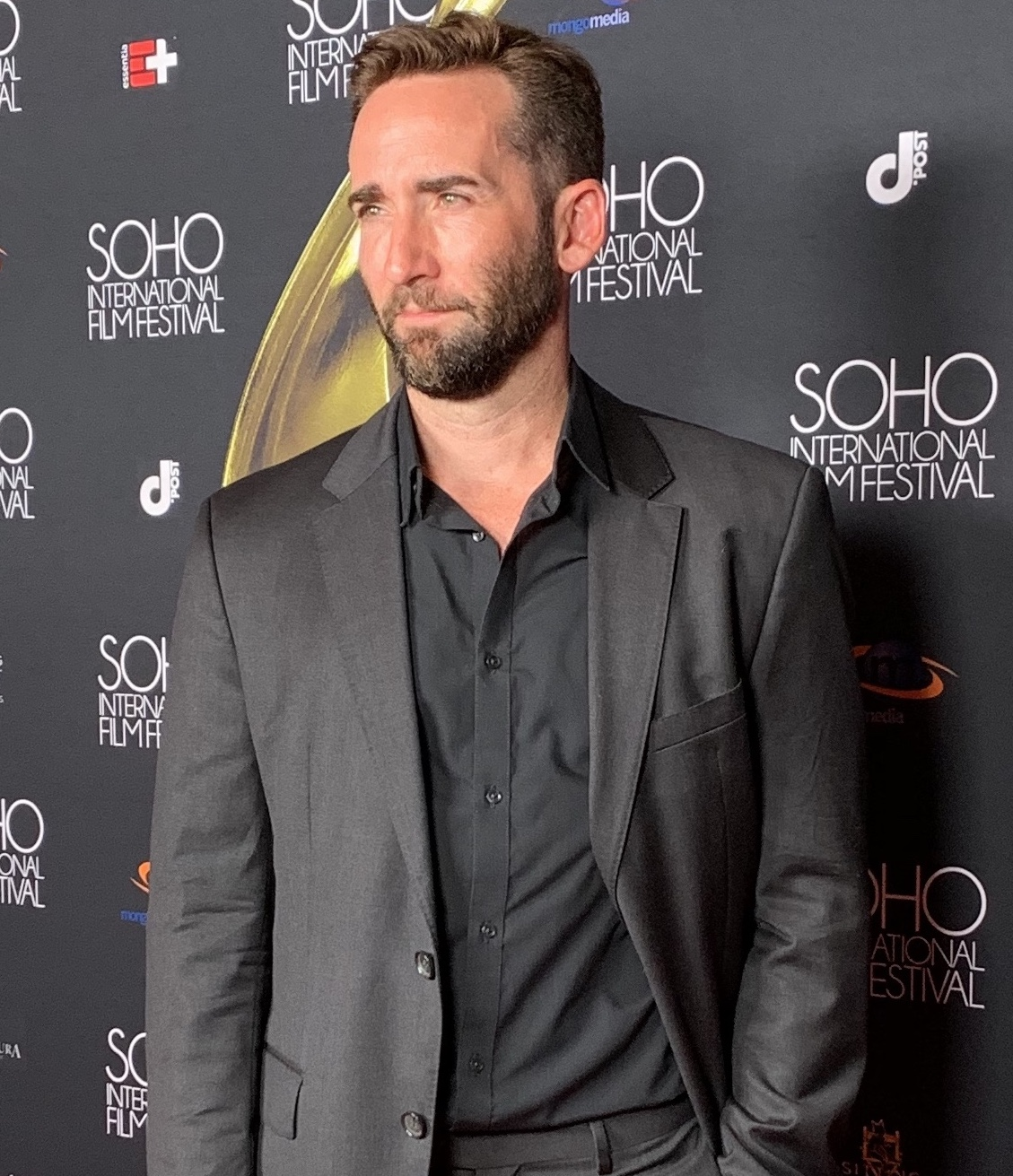
- Daniel Keith at the SoHo Intl Film Festival for Love in Kilnerry
- Born: October 19, 1982 (age 44); Bedford, Texas, U.S.
- Education: University of North Texas, Stella Adler Studio of Acting, Royal Academy of Dramatic Arts (UK), Circle in the Square, Atlantic Theater,
- Occupations: Writer; director; producer; actor; musician
- Years active: 2001–present

Daniel Keith (born October 19, 1982) is an American actor, screenwriter and playwright, director, producer, and musician. He is best known for his roles as Sheriff Gary O'Reilly in Love in Kilnerry and the lead singer of the rock band, Modakai. He has taught at the American Theater of Actors in New York City.

== Early life and education ==
Keith was born in a small ranching town in Bedford, Texas, in 1982. His father, Dan, was a Marine and an air traffic controller. His mother, Jacquelyn, worked in the mailroom at IBM. His parents amicably divorced when Keith was five. He played in rock bands while at Trinity High School and played drums in the marching band. He attended the University of North Texas before touring the country with his band, Modakai. In 2006, the band moved to New York City. When the band went on hiatus in 2009, Keith's best friend suggested he try acting and Keith enrolled at the Stella Adler Studio of Acting. In 2013 he enrolled in Circle in the Square Theatre School, followed by Atlantic Theater, Magnet Theater, and in 2021 enrolled in the Royal Academy of Dramatic Art. He also studied with Sybil Lines of the Royal Shakespeare Company and Jon Shear, an MFA Grad Professor at Columbia University.

== Career ==
=== Music ===
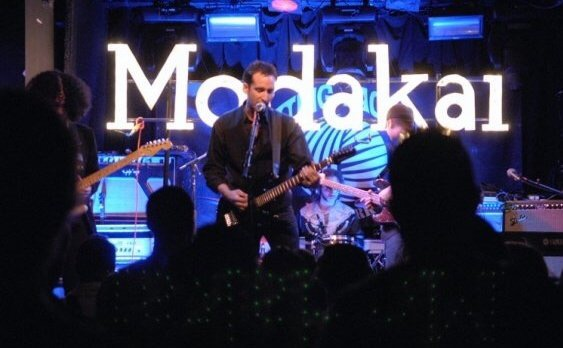
Modakai live at The Knitting Factory in New York City in 2009

Modakai (originally called Belafonte) was formed in 2003 in Dallas, Texas, by Keith (lead vocals, guitar, keyboard), Joel Buchanan (drums), Daniel Rohrs (bass), and Joseph Otto (guitar, keyboard, vocals). The band's first EP, Any Place Is Better Than Here, was premiered on BBC Radio 1 by Jo Whiley in 2005. The band toured the US following their second and third singles "As Hard As You Like It" and "If You'll Stay". The band moved to New York City in 2006, headlining Arlene's Grocery, the Knitting Factory, and Mercury Lounge. They won second place in the Emergenza Battle of the Bands event in 2007. Modakai released their self titled album in 2009 (produced by Rip Rowan, James McWilliams, and engineered by Paul Williams). Before leaving for their UK tour, the band went on hiatus and didn't release another EP for eight years, until Bedroom Recordings, featuring demo tracks, peel sessions, and raw recordings from their bedroom. In 2021, two tracks from their self-titled album, "Everything" and "It Was You", appeared on the motion picture soundtrack for Love in Kilnerry, released by Archway Pictures.

=== Film, TV, Stage ===
Keith was cast in his first theater play in New York in 2013 in Mark Hooker's Miss Longview Texas Drag Pageant as the promiscuous cowboy, Willey. As an excuse to be on as many television and movie sets as possible, to learn as much as he could, Keith worked as a background actor and as a stand-in for Mark Ruffalo, Jim Parsons, and Joe Mantello in Normal Heart, for Justin Timberlake in Runner Runner, and for Cory Michael Smith in the first two seasons of Gotham. He shot his first short film, called Rambler, in 2013. He was cast in his first television appearance in Person of Interest as a bomb maker, named Isaac. He has also appeared in shows such as The Blacklist, Blindspot, and Marvel's Luke Cage.

In 2017 he wrote, directed, produced, and starred in his directorial debut feature of Love in Kilnerry. His company, Archway Pictures, teamed up with Mutiny Pictures to expand the theatrical release nationally.

== Filmography ==
Film
Release date	Title	Role	Director	Notes
2013	Rambler	Rambler	Patrick Quagliano	Short Film debut
2013	Glasspack vs Blackstone	Bryan Hendelman	James Austin	Feature Film
2013	Dogs of the Dow	Garrett	Brian Hedenberg	Short Film
2013	Sins of Lambs	Tommy Donovan	Brian Hedenberg	Short Film
2013	The Lion	Billy McKay	Brian Hedenberg	Short Film
2013	Small World	Everette	Garrett Carey	Short Film
2020	Petty Cash	Lone Drinker	Matt Simon	Short Film
2022	Love in Kilnerry	Gary O'Reilly	Daniel Keith	Directorial Feature Debut

== Television ==
Television
Year	Title	Episode	Role	Network
2014	Person of Interest	S.4 Ep.10	Isaac	CBS
2015	The Blacklist	S.2 EP.19	Head of Security	NBC
2017	Blindspot	S.2 Ep.19, 20	NYPD Cop (Re-Occurring)	NBC
2018	Luke Cage	S.2 Ep.11	Jerry	Netflix
2021	Strut	S.1 Ep.1	Officer Walkman	Revry

== Theatre credits ==
Stage (partial)
Year	Play	Author	Role	Location	Notes
2006	Picass at the Lapin Agile	Steve Martin	Pablo Picasso	Dallas, Texas	Regional
2012	Miss Longview Texas Drag Pageant	Mark Hooker	Wiley	New York City	World Premier
2013	Shining City	Conor McPherson	Ian	New York City	The Actors Studio
2014	April's Fool	Kelly McAllister	Jaypse	New York City	International Fringe Festival
2015	The Breaking Room	Colin Filmore	Sam	New York CIty	Manhattan Theater Club Studios
2016	Some Squeaky Cleopatra Boy	Larry Rinkle	Michael	New York CIty	Manhattan Repertory
2016	Love in Kilnerry	Daniel Keith	Gary O'Reilly	New York CIty	Manhattan Theater Club Studios

== Awards and nominations ==
Year	Award	Category	Role	Work	Result
2005	WorldFest Houston	Best Original Screenplay – Silver Award	Writer	When Hearts Run Wild	Won
2005	WorldFest Houston	TV series – Silver Award	Producer	HD Undersea	Won
2014	Philadelphia Independent Film Festival	Best Short Film	Producer, writer	Rambler	Won
2014	International Independent Film Awards	Narrative Short	Producer, writer	Rambler	Won
2014	International Independent Film Awards	Best Actor in a Leading Role	Actor	Rambler	Won
2014	Dublin International Short Film and Music Festival	Best Actor – Jury Prize	Actor	Rambler	Won
2014	Highway 61 Film Festival	Drama Short	Writer, producer, actor	Rambler	Nominated
2017	ScreenCraft	Best Screenplay – Feature	Writer	Love in Kilnerry	Nominated
2017	Portland Comedy Film Festival	Best Screenplay	Writer	Love in Kilnerry	Nominated
2017	Hollywood Screenplay Contest	Best Screenplay – Silver Prize	Writer	Love in Kilnerry	Nominated
2017	Die Laughing Film festival	Best Screenplay	Writer	Love in Kilnerry	Nominated
2017	New York Film and TV Festival	Best Screenplay	Writer	Love in Kilnerry	Nominated
2017	New York Film and TV Festival	Best Screenplay	Writer	Love in Kilnerry	Nominated
2019	Madrid International Film Festival	Best Director	Director	Love in Kilnerry	Nominated
2019	Calcutta International Cult Film Festival	Best Screenplay – Golden Fox Award	Writer	Love in Kilnerry	Nominated
2019	New Hampshire Film Festival	Best NH Narrative Feature	Producer, writer, director, actor	Love in Kilnerry	Won
2019	New Hampshire Film Festival	Best Original Screenplay – Festival Award	Writer	Love in Kilnerry	Won
2019	New Hampshire Film Festival	First Time Director – Chris Brinker Award	Director	Love in Kilnerry	Nominated
2019	New Hampshire Film Festival	Best Comedy – Festival Award	Producer, writer, director, actor	Love in Kilnerry	Nominated
2019	New Hampshire Film Festival	Litecoin Film Award – Audience Award	Producer, writer, director, actor	Love in Kilnerry	Nominated
2019	New Hampshire Film Festival	Audience Choice – Feature	Producer, writer, director, actor	Love in Kilnerry	Nominated
2019	Williamsburg International Film Festival	US Narrative Feature – Festival Award	Producer, writer, director, actor	Love in Kilnerry	Won
2019	SoHo International Film Festival	Best Feature Film – Grand Jury Award	Producer, writer, director, actor	Love in Kilnerry	Nominated
2019	Los Angeles Film Awards	Best Ensemble	Actor	Love in Kilnerry	Won
2019	Los Angeles Film Awards	Best Narrative Feature	Producer, writer, director, actor	Love in Kilnerry	Won
2019	Los Angeles Film Awards	Best Comedy	Producer, writer, director, actor	Love in Kilnerry	Won
2019	Los Angeles Film Awards	Best Romantic Comedy	Producer, writer, director, actor	Love in Kilnerry	Won
2019	Los Angeles Film Awards	Best Director	Director	Love in Kilnerry	Won
2019	Los Angeles Film Awards	Best Original Story	Writer	Love in Kilnerry	Won
2019	International Independent Film Awards	Narrative Feature – Platinum Award	Producer, writer, director, actor	Love in Kilnerry	Won
2019	International Independent Film Awards	Best Actor in a Leading Role – Platinum Award	Actor	Love in Kilnerry	Won
2019	International Independent Film Awards	Best Director – Platinum Award	Director	Love in Kilnerry	Won
2019	Jersey Shore Film Festival	Best Director – Jury Award	Director	Love in Kilnerry	Won
2020	Los Angeles Independent Film Festival Awards	Best Feature – Jury Award	Producer, writer, director, actor	Love in Kilnerry	Won
2020	Los Angeles Independent Film Festival Awards	Best Screenplay – Jury Award	Writer	Love in Kilnerry	Won
2020	Los Angeles Independent Film Festival Awards	Best Actor – Jury Award	Actor	Love in Kilnerry	Won
2020	Los Angeles Independent Film Festival Awards	Best Director – Jury Award	Director	Love in Kilnerry	Nominated
2020	Los Angeles Independent Film Festival Awards	Best Producer – Jury Award	Producer	Love in Kilnerry	Nominated
2020	Los Angeles Independent Film Festival Awards	Best First Time Filmmaker	Director	Love in Kilnerry	Nominated
2020	International Independent Film Awards	Best Original Song "Everything" – Modakai – Platinum Award	Musician	Love in Kilnerry	Won
2020	International Independent Film Awards	Best Original Song "It Was You" – Modakai – Platinum Award	Musician	Love in Kilnerry	Won
2020	International Filmmaker Festival of World Cinema, London	Best Comedy	Producer, writer, director, actor	Love in Kilnerry	Nominated
2020	International Filmmaker Festival of World Cinema, London	Best Lead Actor	Actor	Love in Kilnerry	Nominated
2020	Around International Film Festival	Best Film – ARFF Paris	Producer, writer, director, actor	Love in Kilnerry	Nominated
2020	Around International Film Festival	Best Director – ARFF Official Award	Director	Love in Kilnerry	Nominated
2021	Los Angeles Film Awards	Best Comedy Screenplay	Writer	Rebranding Henry (aka Artemis)	Won
2022	Berlin Independent Film Festival	Best Comedy Screenplay	Writer	Rebranding Henry (aka Artemis)	Won
