= Lost Cat Corona =

- Theatrical release poster
- Directed by: Anthony Tarsitano
- Written by: Anthony Tarsitano
- Produced by: Brendan Fitzgerald; Summer Crockett Moore; Tony Glazer; Richard Mucci; Frank Sicoli; Jeanne Suggs; Anthony Tarsitano; Deborah Tarsitano
- Starring: Sean Young; Ralph Macchio; Gina Gershon; Jeff Kober; Paul Sorvino; Summer Crockett Moore; David Zayas; Tom Wopat; Anthony Ruivivar
- Cinematography: Chase Bowman
- Production company: Choice Films
- Distributed by: Virgil Films
- Release date: February 24, 2017
- Country: United States
- Language: English

Lost Cat Corona is a 2017 American comedy film written, co-produced and directed by Anthony Tarsitano. The film stars Ralph Macchio, Gina Gershon, Paul Sorvino and Sean Young.

== Plot ==
A play-it-safe guy (Ralph Macchio) must search for his wife's (Gina Gershon) missing cat, bringing him face-to-face with the colorful, wacky, and sometimes, the more dangerous element of his neighborhood, forcing him to confront his fears and rethink his M.O.

== Cast ==
- Sean Young as Roxie
- Ralph Macchio as Dominic
  - John D'Leo as Teenage Dom
- Gina Gershon as Connie
- Jeff Kober as Sue
- Kathrine Narducci as Nora
- Paul Sorvino as Uncle Sam
- David Zayas as Ponce
- Barbara Rosenblat as Connie's Mom
- Karina Arroyave as Lucia
- Adam Ferrara as Sal
- Tom Wopat as Jimmy Pipes
- Anthony Ruivivar as Guillermo

== Production ==
Principal photography took place in May and June 2015 in Corona, New York, and Whitestone, New York.
