= List of Saw (franchise) media =

Saw is an American horror media franchise created by Australian filmmakers James Wan and Leigh Whannell and distributed by Lions Gate Entertainment and Twisted Pictures. The films take place in a fictional universe that revolves around a serial killer, dubbed The Jigsaw Killer, who captures victims who he believes do not appreciate their life and puts them into traps to test their survival instinct. While starting as a film series, Saw has evolved to encompass numerous media forms including video games and comics as well as mazes and a roller coaster. According to The New York Times in October 2009, including international sales and revenue from DVDs, television and merchandise, the Saw series has taken in more than $1 billion, making it one of the highest-grossing horror franchises in history. This comprises over 28 million DVDs sold and $665 million worth of ticket sales for the first five films alone, along with various other merchandise. On July 23, 2010, the franchise was recognized by the Guinness World Records as the "Most Successful Horror Movie Series".

The series debuted on October 29, 2004, with Saw. The film was met with much financial success, which allowed the sequel, Saw II, to be created and released a year later. Subsequent sequels were released a year after the previous film, all on the Friday before Halloween. Ten films have been made in the franchise. The success of the films has influenced such products as Saw: The Video Game, which was published by Konami in 2009 and released before the sixth film. Other products include a comic book, Saw: Rebirth, which was released before the second film. The most recent products released were a second video game, which released in October 2010 and a tenth film, which released in September 2023.

== Films ==
Saw
Original release dates:
October 29, 2004 – Theatrical release
February 15, 2005 – Home media
Notes:
- The only full film in the series directed by creator James Wan

Saw II
Original release dates:
October 28, 2005 – Theatrical release
February 14, 2006 – Home media
Notes:
- Holds the highest domestic gross for any Saw film with $87 million
- The first film in the series directed by Darren Lynn Bousman

Saw III
Original release dates:
October 27, 2006 – Theatrical release
January 23, 2007 – Home media
Notes:
- Holds the highest worldwide gross for any Saw film with just under $165 million

Saw IV
Original release dates:
October 26, 2007 – Theatrical release
January 22, 2008 – Home media

Saw V
Original release dates:
October 24, 2008 – Theatrical release
January 20, 2009 – Home media
Notes:
- Currently holds the lowest cumulative reviews of all the films
- The only film in the series directed by David Hackl

Saw VI
Original release dates:
October 23, 2009 – Theatrical release
January 26, 2010 – Home media
Notes:
- Holds the lowest theatrical grosses both domestically and internationally for any Saw film with approximately $64 million total gross
- The first film in the series to be directed by Kevin Greutert

Saw 3D
Original release dates:
October 29, 2010 – Theatrical release
January 25, 2011 – Home media
Notes:
- The only Saw film shot in 3-D
- Kevin Greutert returned to direct
- Cary Elwes who played Dr. Gordon in the first Saw film finally returns after five sequels.

Jigsaw
Original release dates:
October 27, 2017 – Theatrical release
January 23, 2018 – Home media
Notes:
- Continuation of the series after a seven-year absence.
- The first Saw film released on 4K Ultra HD Blu-ray

Spiral
Original release dates:
May 14, 2021 – Theatrical release
July 20, 2021 – Home media
Notes:
- Spin-off of the series.
- The first film in the franchise to not star Bell nor feature the Jigsaw character onscreen.
- Darren Lynn Bousman returned to direct

Saw X
Original release dates:
September 29, 2023 – Theatrical release
November 21, 2023 – Home media
Notes:
- Kevin Greutert returned to direct.
- Tobin Bell, Shawnee Smith, and Costas Mandylor returned as John Kramer, Amanda Young, and Mark Hoffman.
- set between Saw I and Saw II.

=== Short film ===
Saw (2003)
Original release dates:
October 18, 2005 – DVD (Saw Uncut Edition)
Notes:
- Short film created to pitch the Saw script to studios
- Later included on the Uncut DVD of Saw

== Other media ==
=== Video games ===
Game	Details
Saw Original release date(s): October 6, 2009 – video game	Release years by system: Xbox 360, PlayStation 3: North America: October 6, 2009; Europe: November 20, 2009; Australia: December 3, 2009; Microsoft Windows: Worldwide: October 22, 2009
Saw Original release date(s): October 6, 2009 – video game	Notes: Published by Konami and developed by Zombie Studios
Saw II: Flesh & Blood Original release date(s): October 19, 2010 – video game	Release years by system: Xbox 360, PlayStation 3: North America: October 19, 2010; Europe: October 22, 2010; Australia: November 11, 2010
Saw II: Flesh & Blood Original release date(s): October 19, 2010 – video game	Notes: Published by Konami and developed by Zombie Studios; Set between Saw and Saw II, it is a sequel to the first Saw game

=== Printed ===
Saw: Rebirth
Original release dates:
October 25, 2005 – comic book
Notes:
- One-shot comic book by IDW Publishing
- A chronological prequel to Saw
- Turned into an animated comic to promote Saw II
- Its canonicity was later contradicted by events in Saw IV. It is, however, the first canonical appearance of Jigsaw's wife, Jill, who was later introduced into the film series in Saw III, and established still-canonical elements of Jigsaw's backstory (an engineer who is dying from brain cancer.)

=== Merchandise ===
Merchandise
Original release dates:
Various releases – action figure, figurine, novelty item, Halloween costumes
Notes:
- Includes Billy dolls, Jigsaw figurines and costumes, and "Pig mask" figurines and masks

=== Digital art ===
''Saw Chapter One''
Original release dates:
October 26, 2021 – (Traps)
October 28, 2021 – (Schematics and Keys)
Notes:
- 10,000 collectibles, NFT collection
- Includes access to never-before-seen content from the Saw franchise
