= Spec Ops II: Green Berets =

1999 video game

- Developer(s): Zombie Studios (PC); Runecraft (DC)
- Publisher(s): Ripcord Games
- Series: Spec Ops
- Platform(s): Microsoft Windows, Dreamcast
- Release: Windows; NA: November 8, 1999; EU: 1999; Dreamcast; NA: October 25, 2000; EU: August 10, 2001
- Genre(s): Tactical shooter
- Mode(s): Single-player, multiplayer

Spec Ops II: Green Berets is a tactical shooter video game developed by Zombie Studios and published by Ripcord Games exclusively for Microsoft Windows. It is the second game in the Spec Ops series. A remake was released in 2000 for the Dreamcast entitled Spec Ops II: Omega Squad.

== Reception ==
Reception

Aggregate scores
| Aggregator | Score | |
| Aggregator | Dreamcast | PC |
|---|---|---|
| GameRankings | 49% | 53% |
| Metacritic | 50/100 | N/A |

Review scores
| Publication | Score | |
| Publication | Dreamcast | PC |
|---|---|---|
| AllGame | 2/5 stars | N/A |
| CNET Gamecenter | N/A | 3/10 |
| Computer Games Strategy Plus | N/A | 2.5/5 stars |
| Computer Gaming World | N/A | 2.5/5 stars |
| EP Daily | N/A | 4/10 |
| GamePro | N/A | 3/5 stars |
| GameSpot | 5.3/10 | 5.6/10 |
| IGN | N/A | 5.2/10 |
| Next Generation | N/A | 1/5 stars |
| PC Accelerator | N/A | 6/10 |
| PC Gamer (US) | N/A | 26% |

Green Berets received mixed reviews according to GameRankings, while Omega Squad also received mixed reviews according to Metacritic. Max Everingham of NextGen called the former "a second effort that, stupefyingly, manages to be far worse than the first."

== Expansion ==
Spec Ops II: Operation Bravo is a free expansion pack released online on December 31, 1999. It features 25 new maps and modes along with various other improvements to the game.

Spec Ops II: Operation Bravo
- Publisher(s): Ripcord Games
- Series: Spec Ops
- Platform(s): Microsoft Windows
- Release: Windows; NA: November 8, 1999
