= Zombie Studios =

American video game developer

- Company type: Private
- Industry: Video games
- Founded: 1994; 32 years ago
- Founder: Joanna Alexander; Mark Long
- Defunct: January 8, 2015
- Headquarters: Seattle, Washington, U.S.
- Products: Spec Ops series

Zombie Studios was an American independent video game developer. It was formed in 1994 as Zombie, LLC by Joanna Alexander and Mark Long, formerly of the Sarnoff Research Center. Alexander and Long founded Zombie after they completed the design of a virtual reality headset for Hasbro at Sarnoff in 1993.

== History ==
In 1994, backed by an investment from Nick Nicholas, the former chairman of Time Warner Inc, Zombie Studios was founded to design computer games.Mark Long and Joanna Alexander, founders of Zombie Studios, met in 1991 while designing virtual reality simulators for the military at the David Sarnoff Research Center in Princeton, N.J.

By 2001, the company employed 24 people.

Zombie Studios shut down in January 2015 with its owners' retirement. Former staffers of the company subsequently founded a new studio, Builder Box Games (now Hardsuit Labs), who acquired some of Zombie Studio's former IPs.

== Games developed ==
- Ice & Fire (1995)
- Locus (1995)
- Zork Nemesis (1996)
- ZPC (1996)
- CyberSpace Mountain- VR Ride (1997)
- Spec Ops: Rangers Lead the Way (1998)
- Spec Ops: Ranger Team Bravo (1998) (Rangers Lead the Way expansion)
- Spearhead (1998)
- Body Glove's Bluewater Hunter (1999)
- Spec Ops II: Green Berets (1999)
- Spec Ops II: Operation Bravo (2000) (Green Berets expansion)
- Tom Clancy's Rainbow Six: Covert Operations Essentials (2000) (Rogue Spear expansion)
- Spec Ops: Stealth Patrol (2000)
- Spec Ops II: Omega Squad (2000)
- Spec Ops: Ranger Elite (2001)
- Spec Ops: Covert Assault (2001)
- Alcatraz: Prison Escape (2001)
- Atlantis: The Lost Empire – Search for the Journal (2001)
- Atlantis: The Lost Empire – Trial by Fire (2001)
- Delta Force: Task Force Dagger (2002)
- Super Bubble Pop (2002)
- Shadow Ops: Red Mercury (2004)
- Saw (2009)
- Blacklight: Tango Down (2010)
- Saw II: Flesh & Blood (2010)
- Blackwater (2011)
- Blacklight: Retribution (2012)
- Frogger: Hyper Arcade Edition (2012)
- Special Forces: Team X (2013)
- Daylight (2014)
- Phantom Army (2014)

=== Direct Action Games ===
- Combat: Task Force 121 (2005)
- World War II Combat: Road to Berlin (2006)
- World War II Combat: Iwo Jima (2006)
- CQC: Close Quarters Conflict (2006)

=== United States Armed Forces games ===
The developer was commissioned by the United States Armed Forces to co-develop a series of training and recruitment games. Some games were developed entirely by the developer, but some were co-developed with the U.S. Army Development Team, and others were made with other game developers.

- America's Army: Special Forces (2003)
- Future Force Company Commander (2006)
- Virtual Army Experience
- AH-64D Apache Simulator
- Future Soldier Trainer
- Convoy Trainer
- JROTC First Aid Trainer
