= Stratosphere (disambiguation) =

The stratosphere is a region of Earth's upper atmosphere.

Stratosphere may also refer to:

- Stratosphere: Conquest of the Skies, a 1998 computer game
- "Stratosphere gun", nickname for the U.S. Army 120 mm M1 gun
- Stratosphere Las Vegas, a casino hotel in Las Vegas, Nevada
- Suzuki Stratosphere, a concept motorcycle

== Music ==
- Stratosphere Sound, a recording studio in New York City
- Stratosfear, a 1976 album by Tangerine Dream
- Stratosphere (Duster album), 1998
- Stratosphere (Matt Sorum album), 2014
- "Stratosphere", a song by Stratovarius

== See also ==
- Satrosphere, former name of Aberdeen Science Centre
