= Armor Command =

1998 video game

- Developer: Ronin Entertainment
- Publishers: Ripcord Games; Red Ant Enterprises Pty Ltd. Take Two Interactive
- Producers: Kalani Streicher, Nathan Wright
- Designer: Edward Kilham
- Programmer: Edward Kilham
- Artist: Harrison Fong
- Platform: Microsoft Windows
- Release: 1998
- Genre: Real-time strategy
- Modes: Single-player, multiplayer

Armor Command is a military science fiction real-time strategy video game developed by American studio Ronin Entertainment and published by Ripcord Games for Windows in 1998. Set in the early 30th century, the game revolves around two factions, the United Terran Federation led by humanity, and the Vrass, a feudal slaver empire led by aliens. Armor Command was designed by Edward Kilham, known as the co-designer of ‘’Star Wars: TIE Fighter’’. Armor Command received generally positive and mediocre reviews, although it was seen as obscure in comparison to more notable games in the genre.

== Gameplay ==
Screenshot demonstrating the different camera views during a skirmish

Armor Command is a real-time strategy game set in the distant future, using a 3D display view. The two races are humans under banner of the United Terran Federation, and a slaver alien race called the Vrass, but nicknamed Slavers. Both are somewhat homogeneous gameplay-wise, their main differences being aesthetic. A close-up view is available that lets the player focus on units, along with a less focused in one, though a top-down, eagle's eye view is present.

Mechanics involve an unseen and unplayable orbiting fleet, which beam units and supplies to the surface using pad buildings -- the town halls of the game. Ore and metal are the two resources of the game, which may be mined using specialized worker units. Ore is used as a general resource and metal is more specialized, used for purposes such as upgrades. Radar towers may be constructed to bypass the fog of war. Aerial and ground units are available. The only units available in-game are mechanical, no infantry exists. Most units may attack when moving. The single player campaign involves 22 missions on each side, as well as five training missions.

Multiplayer is available up to four players, with LAN and modem options available.

== Plot ==
The Vrass are a contingent of their species that have entered human space from a wormhole, starting the events of the game in 2910. Though some space-conflict occurs, most of the fighting between the two races occurs on terrestrial settings, caused by the interference of a nebula. Friendly to Terran indigenous alien races are hinted at throughout the game. The game contains two mutually exclusive campaigns, both of which have different results. The Terran campaign culminates after several interstellar battles, when the aliens are pushed back to the wormhole, and are destroyed. The human forces resolve to study the wormhole and develop technology to defeat the rest of the aliens.

The alien campaign concludes with an invasion of the Earth, resulting in the enslavement of the population.

== Reception ==
Reception

Aggregate score
Aggregator	Score
GameRankings	56%

Review scores
Publication	Score
Computer Gaming World	3/5
Edge	6/10
GameSpot	7/10
Next Generation	3/5
PC Gamer (US)	78%

Armor Command received mixed reviews according to the review aggregation website GameRankings. Themes raised included the lack of innovation and criticism over the control and camera designs. The control and cameras were seen as the primary flaws, overshadowing anything else. However, the game was praised for the fidelity of its 3D graphics, seen as a rarity at the time among the RTS genre.

Alan Dunkin of GameSpot said, "Armor Command in many ways is no different from a generic real-time strategy game: direct troops, destroy the enemy, develop your base of operations, exploit resources, and move on to the next scenario. If you're new to the real-time genre or you're just completely addicted to them, it might be a nice distraction from the standard fare. But veteran real-time strategy players will not find much to impress them." However, he noted that if the control and camera system was improved, then "Armor Command would have been tremendously better", and also praised its graphics. Computer Gaming World stated, "After all is said and done, Armor Command is a competent Command & Conquer clone with a good gimmick and quite a bit of gameplay for your dollar." Next Generation said, "Mix in excellent multiplayer action, and Armor Command comes up as a solid game glutted with a lot of crap. It doesn't push the genre to a whole new level, but it doesn't insult it either."
