= Hello Zepp =

Incidental music by Charlie Clouser

Song by Charlie Clouser

from the album Saw (Original Motion Picture Soundtrack)
- Released: October 5, 2004
- Genre: Incidental music
- Label: Koch Records
- Songwriter: Charlie Clouser

"Hello Zepp" is a piece of incidental music that was composed by Charlie Clouser for the 2004 horror film Saw. The song, which is written in the key of D minor, serves as the main theme of the entire Saw film series. The piece's appearance in the first film was timed to bring a dramatic tone to the end of the film, in which Zep Hindle is revealed to actually be a victim of the Jigsaw Killer (the character's name in the script is spelled "Zep" but the music titles are spelled "Zepp"). As the series continued, the piece was reused in all the films, often being renamed and remixed to accommodate the changing situations and characters.

== Usage ==
=== Saw franchise ===
- Saw – The tune appears five times in Saw. The first plays during the reveal that Detective David Tapp has been spying on Dr. Lawrence Gordon's apartment. The second plays during a flashback as Tapp watches a Billy tape. The third, titled "X Marks the Spot", plays during a conversation between Adam Stanheight and Dr. Gordon. The fourth and most well-known version, "Hello Zepp", appears at the end of the film, when the identity of the Jigsaw Killer is finally revealed to be John Kramer the cancer patient, rather than Zep Hindle, who was participating in the abduction of Dr. Gordon's family as a part of his own test. "Hello Zepp" begins when Adam began to play Zep's tape, of which the first words were "Hello, Mr. Hindle. Or as they called you around the hospital: Zep." The fifth is the theme "Zepp Overture" and plays during the end credits of the unrated edition.
- Saw II – The tune appears three times in Saw II. The first remix is played when Amanda Young reveals she has been tested by Jigsaw before and is titled "Played". The second plays when Xavier Chavez corners Amanda and Daniel Matthews in the bathroom from the original movie and begins to cut the back of his neck off for part of the combination to the safe upstairs, and is titled "Cut Necks". For the film, only the ending was used while the original "Hello Zepp" was remixed for the scene. The final remix appears at the end of the film; titled "Hello Eric", it is played when Amanda reveals to Eric Matthews that she has become Jigsaw's apprentice.
- Saw III – In Saw III, it plays seven times. The first occurrence is titled "Amanda" and plays when she arrives at Jigsaw's new lair and wheels Dr. Lynn Denlon in to meet a cancer-strickened Jigsaw. The second is titled "It's Begun" and appears when Amanda tells Jigsaw that Jeff Denlon has broken out of the box. The third is titled "Be Surprised" and plays during a flashback of Jigsaw setting up Amanda's reverse bear trap. The fourth occurrence, titled "Prep" is a loose mix and plays just prior to Jigsaw's surgery. The second remix plays over a flashback sequence, which sheds more light on the design of the bathroom trap from the first film. The tune was named "Shithole" after a line in the original film and was later rearranged as "The Shithole Theme". The sixth occurrence of the track is titled "Your Test" and is a remix of the "Hello Eric" theme, playing as Jigsaw explains his test design to Amanda. The final is at the very end of the film, and plays over the tape that Jigsaw has prepared for Jeff. This remix is titled "Final Test". At almost two minutes, "Final Test" is basically a more intense and shortest ending version of "Hello Zepp" heard in the films.
- Saw IV – In Saw IV, it is played eight times. The first, titled "Just Begun", is when Mark Hoffman plays the wax tape found during Jigsaw's autopsy. The second tune occurs two times (three in the Director's Cut) during the film, titled "Help Them". It plays first when Eric Matthews remembers how he survived his confrontation with Amanda after escaping the bathroom, second when Jill Tuck has her miscarriage, and last when Agent Peter Strahm confronts Jill with various pictures (after an inserted deleted scene uses the preceding musical track). The next occurrence plays while Strahm and Agent Lindsey Perez investigate Ivan Landsness' trap (and later Rex and Morgan's), titled "Step Back" and "New Game". The third mix, titled "Lesson", plays while John follows and abducts Cecil Adams for his track. The final version plays during the twist finale. Titled "Let Go", it plays to a tape Art Blank plays for Officer Daniel Rigg, telling him he failed his test. This version introduces a new brass section that plays broadly after Hoffman reveals himself to be Jigsaw’s other apprentice and eventual successor to Rigg and locking Strahm in the sickroom before a guitar riff transition to the ending to “Hello Eric”.
- Saw V – In Saw V, it plays four times. The first is a combination of "X Marks the Spot" from Saw and "Lesson" from Saw IV, which plays during a scene in which Jigsaw and Hoffman set up the house trap from Saw II. The second plays over Jill Tuck and Agent Dan Erickson's scene. This variation of the theme has not been released. The third, simply titled "Zepp Five", occurs when Strahm is trapped in the compactor room, and is very similar to "Let Go" from Saw IV. The first half of the song is more foreboding, implying the impending doom of Strahm. The second half becomes more action-oriented, beginning with a rising theme (similar to the one heard in "Final Test") and culminating in a brass ensemble (as heard in Saw IV) played intensely alongside a screeching string instrument as Strahm is crushed to death. The remix is two and half minutes long. The final version plays during the credits, and is one of the unused "Just Begun" mixes.
- Saw VI – In Saw VI, it plays four times. The first is a remix of "Step Back" and "New Game". Entitled "Jill Drives", it plays when Jill Tuck drives to the hospital. The second is played on a piano accompanied by a chorus and plays when Hoffman discovers the note written to Amanda in Saw III and the subsequent flashbacks. The third, titled "Zepp Six", is the longest ending variation of the "Hello Zepp" theme (over six minutes long) and split into two halves. The first half (beginning similarly to a low-pitched "Hello Eric" and heavily featuring William's Theme) begins during William Easton's final test and as Jill sets up Hoffman's test, and ends as William is killed. The second half begins as Hoffman tries to escape from the reverse bear trap. This version is heavily action oriented (using the double bass portions of "Your Test"/"Shithole" and the rising brass theme from "Hello Eric", "Your Test", and "Let Go") before the brass ensemble from "Let Go" reappears, playing heavily and more dramatically before pausing at the last shot of Hoffman screaming.
- Saw 3D – In Saw 3D, it plays seven times. The first is a distorted piano version, played when Dr. Gordon is crawling through a hallway and cauterizes his stump. The second, a remix of "Step Back" (from Saw IV), plays during Jill's interrogation by Detective Matt Gibson. The third plays when Bobby Dagen reveals his fake scars to the Jigsaw survivors. The fourth is a remix of "New Game" (from Saw IV) and plays when the police investigate the aftermath of the garage trap. The fifth briefly plays during the autograph flashback scene. The fifth is a remix of "Zepp Six" with a section from "Let Go", playing when Hoffman places the original reverse bear trap on Jill. The sixth, another remix of "Zepp Six", plays when Dr. Gordon is revealed to have been a Jigsaw accomplice. The final mix is a shortened remix of "Zepp Five" with a choir and plays during the final scene between Dr. Gordon and Hoffman, with a partial remix of the ending of "Zepp Six".
- Jigsaw – In Jigsaw, the score, entitled "Zepp Eight", plays at the end of the movie, beginning when Logan Nelson's body rises from the ground, revealing him to be the first apprentice of and the successor to Jigsaw, and ending when he slams the door shut after having murdered Detective Brad Halloran. "Zepp Eight" is basically a reimagined take of "Zepp Six" from Saw VI. The score also reinserts the middle melancholy strings heard in the original "Hello Zepp". The score also features in renditions similar to the previous entries throughout the movie, like the opening music "Chase Edgar", "Shotgun" played by guitar with dramatic motive when Anna tries to kill Ryan, and "Laser Collars" played when Logan tries to escape the trap in the final part of the film.
- Spiral – The score from Spiral includes some references to the earlier Saw films. An updated version of the untitled track played while Detective Tapp watches a Billy tape (Saw 2004) now plays during the scene of Detective Zeke Banks awakening. This score is titled "You OK?". "Be Partners", used as Zeke confronts William Schenk, takes elements of "Severed Hand/Amanda's Letter" from Saw VI. The main theme, entitled "Zepp Nine", is a very close rendition of the original "Hello Zepp" from first film, but with elements of "Let Go" from Saw IV, with both a new rising section and maintaining the horns most commonly used in Zepp themes from the later installments of the franchise. The score also omits the first portion of the brass ensemble from "Let Go" but maintains the remaining notes of that same part.
- Saw X – In Saw X, the score, entitled "Zepp X", plays at the end of the movie, beginning when Dr. Cecilia Pederson and her partner, Parker Sears, attempt to remove the money that John Kramer had taken from Cecilia after kidnapping her, and inadvertently trigger John’s hidden trap. The score begins with a section nearly identical to the classic "Hello Zepp", but also later features new original orchestral sections, before returning to the classic finish with elements of "Zepp Eight" and "The Final Zepp". A bonus score, entitled "Post Credits X", takes elements of "Zepp Six" and it plays during the mid-credit sequence when John Kramer and Detective Mark Hoffman put Henry Kessler in a trap in the bathroom from the first film.

=== Other ===
The original version of the composition is used in the MS Paint Adventures episode titled "MSPA Reader: Mental breakdown", an Adobe Flash animation from Homestuck, tying with past references to the Saw franchise. This soundtrack is also used in the trailers for Déjà Vu, Valkyrie, and The Box.

== Mixes ==
- Saw (2004): "X Marks the Spot", "Hello Zepp", "Zepp Overture"
- Saw II (2005): "I've Played Before" or "Played", "Cut Necks", "Conscious", "Hello Eric"
- Saw III (2006): "Amanda", "It's Begun", "Be Surprised", "Prep", "Shithole" or "The Shithole Theme", "Your Test", "Final Test"
- Saw IV (2007): "Just Begun", "Help Them", "Step Back", "New Game", "Lesson", "Let Go"
- Saw V (2008): "Saw V Title", "Zepp Five"
- Saw VI (2009): "Jill Drives", "Severed Hand", "Zepp Six", "Hoffman's Zepp"
- Saw 3D: The Final Chapter (2010): "Tablesaw Intro", "Cauterize", "Only You", "Support Group", "Junkyard", "Autographs", "Jill's Zepp", "Roaster", "Dr. Gordon Montage", "The Final Zepp"
- Jigsaw (2017): "Chase Edgar", "USB Stick", "Results Are In", "Shotgun", "Laser Collars", "Zepp Eight"
- Spiral (2021): "You OK?", "Be Partners", "Zepp Nine"
- Saw X (2023): "Prognosis" "Zepp X", "Post Credits X"
