= Space Bunnies Must Die! =

1998 video game

- Developer: Jinx
- Publisher: Ripcord Games
- Platform: Microsoft Windows
- Release: NA: October 27, 1998
- Genre: Action-adventure
- Mode: Single player

Space Bunnies Must Die! is a third-person action-adventure game developed by Pulse Entertainment, which renamed itself Jinx midway through development, and published by Ripcord Games on October 27, 1998 for Microsoft Windows 98. The player character is truck stop waitress and rodeo performer Allison Huxter, who must save the world and her abducted sister from an invading race of mutant bunnies from space.

Space Bunnies Must Die! was pitched to Fox and Comedy Central as a humorous animated series.

== Gameplay ==
Space Bunnies Must Die! has a run-jump-climb-shoot style of gameplay, similar to the Tomb Raider series. Players navigate the game's levels from a central hub, and frequently must acquire objects from one level to solve a puzzle in another.

== Development ==
Though Space Bunnies Must Die! has been often compared to Tomb Raider, the developers have maintained that they started work on Space Bunnies before the 1996 E3, which, though not the first time information on Tomb Raider was made publicly available, was the first time that the press took serious interest in the game. Space Bunnies Must Die! was built with a set of tools called Digi, which were designed in-house by developer Pulse Entertainment (renamed Jinx by the end of development).

The game's environments were mapped with a radiosity renderer and then lit to mimic prerendered light sources.

== Reception ==
Reception

Aggregate score
Aggregator	Score
GameRankings	53%

Review scores
Publication	Score
CNET Gamecenter	4/10
Computer Games Strategy Plus	1.5/5
Computer Gaming World	3/5
GameSpot	5.7/10
GameStar	65%
IGN	6.5/10
Next Generation	3/5
PC Accelerator	4/10
PC Gamer (US)	23%
PC PowerPlay	74%

Criticized for its bland gameplay, confusing levels, and game-breaking glitches, Space Bunnies Must Die! received mixed reviews according to the review aggregation website GameRankings. Next Generation, however, said of the game, "If you overlook the ridiculous plot and don't mind fighting your way through the bugs and smirking bunnies, you might actually enjoy yourself."

Panasonic Interactive Media, parent of Ripcord Games, invested heavily in Space Bunnies Must Die!'s advertising and development. However, it became a commercial failure: the NPD Group reported sales of 2,458 copies for 1998. The game was one of several missteps by Panasonic Interactive Media that led to its closure in March 1999, with Ripcord Games sold to an anonymous outside group.
