= Ripcord Games =

American video game publisher

- Type: Private
- Industry: Video games
- Headquarters: Santa Clara, California, United States
- Products: Postal; Spec Ops

Ripcord Games was a video game publisher and an entertainment software label of Panasonic Interactive Media based in Santa Clara, California.

== History ==
In May 1999, Ripcord Games announced that it had emerged at the Electronic Entertainment Expo as an independent company, following completion of a management buyout of the business from its previous owner, Panasonic Interactive Media Company.

== Games published by Ripcord Games ==
- Armor Command
- Enemy Infestation
- Forced Alliance
- Return Fire 2
- Postal
- Space Bunnies Must Die!
- Spec Ops: Rangers Lead the Way
- Spec Ops: Ranger Team Bravo
- Spec Ops II: Green Berets
- Spec Ops: Omega Squad
- Stratosphere: Conquest of the Skies
- Terra Victus

== Cancelled ==
- Legend of the Blademasters
- Gorkamorka
- Shrapnel: Urban Warfare 2025
