= World War II Combat: Iwo Jima =

2006 video game

- Xbox cover art
- Developer(s): Direct Action Games
- Publisher(s): Groove Games
- Producer(s): Richard Dormer
- Programmer(s): Jay Parker; Russell Nelson; Patrick Coughlin; James Smith
- Composer(s): Alex Guilbert
- Engine: Unreal Engine 2
- Platform(s): Windows, Xbox
- Release: Xbox: NA: July 21, 2006; Windows: NA: July 25, 2006
- Genre(s): First-person shooter
- Mode(s): Single-player, Multiplayer

World War II Combat: Iwo Jima is a 2006 budget-priced first-person shooter developed by Direct Action Games and published by Groove Games for Microsoft Windows and Xbox.

== Gameplay ==
The game consists of ten missions, three of which take place in Saipan and the rest on Iwo Jima. In each mission, the player must complete a number of objectives to progress. The player is equipped with four weapons including a pistol, a secondary firearm, an explosive weapon and a knife (which can be upgraded to a flamethrower in some missions). Restocking on bullets requires the player to search bodies and places as well as occasional ammunition pickups. The player can also try to collect three hidden "Souvenirs" in every mission, which if collected will allow the player to access trivial history and war documentary footage. The Xbox version supports up to four players in split screen mode.

== Development ==
The game's composer, Alex Guilbert, also acted as an audio director and provided voice acting for the title, receiving top billing in the game's credits.

== Reception ==
Reception

Aggregate score
Aggregator	Score	
Aggregator	PC	Xbox
Metacritic	26/100	25/100

Review scores
Publication	Score	
Publication	PC	Xbox
1Up.com	D−	N/A
GameSpot	2/10	2/10
IGN	3/10	3/10
Official Xbox Magazine (US)	N/A	2/10
PC Gamer (US)	18%	N/A

Like its predecessor, World War II Combat: Road to Berlin, it received negative reviews on both platforms according to the review aggregation website Metacritic. It suffered from many of the same problems of the first game.

== See also ==
- World War II Combat: Road to Berlin
