= Daylight (video game) =

2014 video game

- Developer: Zombie Studios
- Publisher: Atlus
- Writer: Jessica Chobot
- Engine: Unreal Engine 4
- Platforms: Microsoft Windows, PlayStation 4
- Release: NA: April 29, 2014; PAL: April 30, 2014
- Genre: Survival horror
- Mode: Single-player

Daylight is a survival horror video game developed by Zombie Studios and published by Atlus for Microsoft Windows and PlayStation 4. It was the first game to be powered by Unreal Engine 4.

== Gameplay ==
The player's goal in each level is to search for notes and logs from the hospital's past, referred to as "remnants", by looking for markings using glow sticks. Once all remnants in a level have been collected, the player is able to acquire a "sigil", an item of significance to the hospital's past, such as a teddy bear and a Bible. Bringing the sigil to "the Seal of Shadows" will unlock the next part of the building, allowing the player to advance further into the hospital and, possibly, to freedom.

Discovering remnants can cause a marking on her arm, which attracts the dangerous "shadow people". The player can either make them disappear by using flares or lose them by running away. The player cannot access any weapons; the only tools available are glowsticks, flares, and a cell phone. The environment layout is randomly generated. The enemies and other antagonists are procedurally spawned.

The game's interface includes the number of remnants the player has to find and the threat level in the hospital. As threat level increases, monsters are more likely to appear.

== Plot ==
The plot is centered around a woman named Sarah who regains consciousness in an abandoned hospital with no memory of how she got there. A mysterious voice tells her to find the secrets of the hospital. With a cell phone, which is her map, she must explore the haunted hospital and survive the mysterious shadow people.

== Reception ==
Reception

Aggregate score
| Aggregator | Score |
|---|---|
| Metacritic | PC: 51/100; PS4: 48/100 |

Review scores
| Publication | Score |
|---|---|
| Destructoid | PC: 4/10 |
| Edge | PC: 3/10 |
| Eurogamer | PC: 7/10 |
| GameSpot | PC: 3/10 |
| GamesRadar+ | PC: 2/5 |
| GameTrailers | PC: 7.4/10 (PS4) 7.4/10 |
| GameZone | 3/10 |
| Hardcore Gamer | PC: 4/5 |
| IGN | PC: 5.8/10; PS4: 5.8/10 |
| PC Gamer (UK) | PC: 43/100 |
| Polygon | PC: 5/10 |
| Push Square | PS4: 2/10 |
| VentureBeat | PS4: 60/100 |

Daylight received mixed reviews from critics. Aggregating review website Metacritic gave the PC version 51/100, and the PlayStation 4 version 48/100. GameZone's Joe Donato opined "Daylight accomplishes nothing. Its attempt to expand on the Slender formula is only enjoyable for as long as you'd ever want to play Slender anyway, and it isn't nearly as effective."
