= World War II Combat: Road to Berlin =

2006 video game

- Xbox cover art
- Developer: Direct Action Games
- Publisher: Groove Games
- Engine: Unreal Engine 2
- Platforms: Windows, Xbox
- Release: Xbox: NA: January 24, 2006; Windows: NA: April 3, 2006
- Genre: First-person shooter
- Modes: Single-player, multiplayer

World War II Combat: Road to Berlin, also known as Battlestrike: Secret Weapons, is a 2006 budget-priced first-person shooter, developed by Direct Action Games and published by Groove Games for Microsoft Windows and Xbox. It was panned by reviewers as having shoddy controls and a rushed, unfinished feel. The game was followed by World War II Combat: Iwo Jima, which released a few months later. Despite not released in Europe, a Xbox version was rated by the german rating system USK 18.

== Story ==
World War II Combat: Road to Berlin takes place during the final days of World War II. The Germans have been developing secret long-range rockets (called "Vengeance Weapons") that they could use to attack opposing countries. Joseph Stalin, the leader of the Soviet Union at the time, wanted to get hold of these rockets in his attempt to dominate the western world. The Soviet Union joined Britain's battle. This meant that the Allies could not battle the Soviets to prevent them from getting hold of the Vengeance Weapons, but rather, they had to race against them to make sure that the weapons did not fall into Stalin's hands. Players take control of Lieutenant Stephen Moore, an officer of the OSS (Office of Strategic Services), a precursor to the CIA. The events that take place in this game are invented, bearing in mind that this storyline is completely fictitious and the "weapons", if any, truly did fall into Soviet hands.

== Reception ==
Reception

Aggregate score
| Aggregator | Score | |
| Aggregator | PC | Xbox |
|---|---|---|
| Metacritic | 20/100 | 23/100 |

Review scores
| Publication | Score | |
| Publication | PC | Xbox |
|---|---|---|
| GameSpot | 2/10 | 2/10 |
| Official Xbox Magazine (US) | N/A | 1/10 |

The game received "generally unfavorable reviews" on both platforms according to the review aggregation website Metacritic.

== See also ==
- World War II Combat: Iwo Jima
