= Blackwater (video game) =

2011 video game

- North American cover art
- Developer: Zombie Studios
- Publisher: 505 Games
- Producer: Pantierra LLC
- Engine: Unreal Engine 3
- Platform: Xbox 360
- Release: NA: October 25, 2011; EU: November 4, 2011
- Genre: First-person shooter
- Modes: Single-player, multiplayer

Blackwater is a first-person shooter video game developed by Zombie Studios with the player assuming the role of a Blackwater Worldwide contractor. The game was first revealed at E3 in 2011, and was later released that year on the Xbox 360, published by 505 Games. Using the Kinect accessory for the console, the game is the first Kinect shooter on the market.

== Gameplay ==
The game is set in a fictional town in North Africa, where players lead a team of operatives. Players are tasked with protecting aid workers and other dignitaries in a volatile nation overrun by a warlord named General Limbano. The gameplay is described as on-rails, similar to the style of arcade games Virtua Cop or Time Crisis. The player moves along a set path and highlights targets with their hand, hovering over them for a few moments to take the shot. To take cover from enemy fire, the player must duck and lean side-to-side.

Describing the characters in the game, Richard Dormer of Zombie Studios said, "They're not commandos ... They're not in there saving the world against the next nuclear bomb. They're there working with the UN and trying to protect people. No one wants to be a hero. Everybody wants to survive the next day. If there's one thing that's important to Blackwater it's their 100% success rate for protecting people." Throughout the game, the player will switch between squad members Devin, Baird, Smash, and Eddie. While playing as Devin and Baird, the gamer will be firing an assault rifle. As Smash, the gamer will use a shotgun and as Eddie, a sniper rifle.

Blackwater gives players the ability to completely control the gameplay experience using a traditional controller or Kinect's controller-free abilities which introduces a level of immersion to the FPS genre. Throughout each stage in the game, there are sequences where the player will have to perform actions such as jumping across gaps or busting down doors. Players can also kick away oncoming melee attackers.

Ian Howe, president of 505 Games said, "being able to get the controller out of player's hands with Kinect and have them on the ground and immersed in the experience will give them a glimpse of what it takes to be a member of an elite fighting force."

== Development ==
Erik Prince approached 505 Games to create and publish the game. Prince said "this game and its immersive Kinect-based approach will give players the chance to experience what it is like to be on a Blackwater team on a mission without being dropped into a real combat situation."

During development, 505 Games and Prince worked hand-in-hand with Zombie Studios and former Blackwater operatives to mimic the intensity of real-world missions.

Describing the game, Prince said, "This is not a training device. This is not a simulator. We're not doing this to teach folks how to conduct military operations in an urban terrain. That's not it at all. This is more along the lines of kids running around their neighborhood playing cops and robbers or cowboys and Indians." Prince sees the game as a potential franchise.

== Reception ==
Reception

Aggregate scores
Aggregator	Score
GameRankings	38.45%
Metacritic	37/100

Blackwater has received generally negative reviews. It had an average score of 38.45% at GameRankings, based on 11 reviews and an average score of 37/100 at Metacritic, based on 12 reviews.

The Official Xbox Magazine gave Blackwater a mixed but mostly positive review with a rating of 7/10. While it noted some flaws such as obvious enemy paths and restarting from the beginning of levels, the review also noted that "where this game shines is its Kinect-based mechanics", saying that they "had a blast shooting, kicking, climbing, jumping, and repelling to complete objectives."

Dan Chiappini, writer for GameSpot, describes the game as "deceptively physical even for a Kinect title, and while it's not designed primarily as a fitness game, it could be a good way to shed a few extra kilos and get your shooter fix at the same time."

In the first review of the game, GamesRadar gave Blackwater 1/10, calling it "an insult to gamers and a step backward for the Kinect", stating that they were "not judging the Kinect's functionality, but instead, Blackwater's complete failure to implement it in any sort of enjoyable fashion."

James Newton of KINECTaku said, "Blackwater is to be commended for maintaining a fairly lively and varied pace." However, he gave it a score of 5/10, concluding that it felt like "a gun game missing a gun".

Giant Bomb also gave this game its "worst game of the year award" for 2011.
