= Locus (video game) =

1995 racing video game

- Developer(s): Zombie LLC
- Publisher(s): GT Interactive
- Platform(s): Windows, MS-DOS, Mac OS
- Release: NA: December 17, 1995
- Genre(s): Racing
- Mode(s): Single-player, multiplayer

Locus is a racing video game developed by Zombie Studios and published by GT Interactive in North America. It was published in 1995 for MS-DOS, Microsoft Windows, and Mac OS.

== Gameplay ==
The player takes control of a mech in a competitive racing arena from a first-person perspective. The arena has no gravity, so competitors can fly in any direction within a three-dimensional space.

== Reception ==
The French gaming magazine, "Joystick", gave a review of this game in February 1996. The German edition of PowerPlay magazine also reviewed this game in March 1996. Finally, the now defunct AllGame.com reviewed this game.
