= Spec Ops (series) =

- Developers: Zombie Studios (1998–2001); Runecraft (2000–01); Big Grub (2002); Yager Development (2012)
- Publishers: Ripcord Games (1998–99); Take-Two Interactive (2000–01); Gotham Games (2002); 2K Games (2012)
- Platforms: Microsoft Windows, PlayStation, Dreamcast, PlayStation 3, Xbox 360, OS X, Linux
- First release: Spec Ops: Rangers Lead the Way; April 30, 1998
- Latest release: Spec Ops: The Line; June 26, 2012

Spec Ops is a series of tactical shooter video games. The first two games were developed by Zombie Studios, while Runecraft assisted development on the next three games, and the sixth game in 2002 developed by Big Grub. The seventh and final game developed by Yager Development released in 2012.

The first two games were published by Ripcord Games, with the following three published by Take-Two Interactive, and the sixth game in 2002 published by Gotham Games.

The series was revived 10 years later in 2012 as a third-person cover shooter with Yager Development taking over development and 2K Games taking over publishing.

== History ==
Release timeline Main series in bold
1998	**Spec Ops: Rangers Lead the Way**
1998	Spec Ops: Ranger Team Bravo
1999	**Spec Ops II: Green Berets**
2000	Spec Ops II: Operation Bravo
2000	**Spec Ops: Stealth Patrol**
2001	**Spec Ops: Ranger Elite**
2001	**Spec Ops: Covert Assault**
2002	**Spec Ops: Airborne Commando**
2003
2004
2005
2006
2007
2008
2009
2010
2011
2012	**Spec Ops: The Line**

It was decided to make Spec Ops into an ongoing franchise while the first game, Spec Ops: Rangers Lead the Way, was still in development. Executive producer Mike Suarez reasoned that the audience for simulation fans "is very loyal; they buy six to twelve products in every year. It's a real evergreen business if you can launch a successful franchise in the simulations category."

Between 1999 and 2002, the games Stealth Patrol, Ranger Elite, Covert Assault, and Airborne Commando came out on the original PlayStation. These featured combat settings and tactical gameplay resembling contemporary titles like SOCOM U.S. Navy SEALs and Rainbow Six.

Spec Ops: The Line (2012) rebooted the Spec Ops series as a third person cover shooter with arcade style gameplay. It received highly positive reviews from critics and has since gained a substantial cult following, particularly for its dark story that explores the morality and psychological consequences of war and the shooter genre itself. However, The Line was a commercial failure, leading to the announcement that there would be no sequel to the game, effectively ending the series.
