= Gorkamorka (video game) =

Cancelled video game

- Developer(s): Realtime Associates
- Publisher(s): Ripcord Games
- Series: Gorkamorka
- Platform(s): Dreamcast; Microsoft Windows
- Release: Cancelled
- Genre(s): Vehicular combat game
- Mode(s): multiplayer

Gorkamorka, also styled as GorkaMorka and Gorka Morka, was a cancelled vehicular combat video game developed by Realtime Associates and to be published by Ripcord Games. It was based on the Gorkamorka board game by Games Workshop. The game was developed for Microsoft Windows and Dreamcast.

The game had players taking control of a vehicle piloted by two Orks, one driver and one gunner, who were fighting against up to 15 enemy vehicles, 32 players in total with the aim of destroying opposing vehicles.

Vehicles would have been totally customisable and arenas featured booby traps and crowd interaction.

== Development ==
Gorkamorka was designed from the racing engine used in Jeff Gordon XS Racing. A playable demo was shown at E3 2000 The game was scheduled to be released in Spring 2001 but was cancelled.
