= Gorkamorka =

Tabletop skirmish wargame

- Cover of the Gorkamorka starter set
- Manufacturers: Games Workshop
- Designers: Andy Chambers; Gavin Thorpe; Rick Priestley
- Publishers: Games Workshop
- Years active: 1997–present
- Players: 2–8
- Chance: High (dice rolling)

Gorkamorka is a tabletop skirmish wargame produced by Games Workshop. It is set on the desert world of Angelis in the Warhammer 40,000 setting, and prominently features Orks.

The player takes control of a group of warriors with the objective to gain wealth and experience. The rules are derived from the second edition of Warhammer 40,000, with extra vehicle rules and an extensive campaign system added. In 1998 it received an expansion set, Digganob, which introduced additional playable factions, special characters, and scenarios.

In 2008 the rule book and source book for Gorkamorka were released on the Games Workshop website under the "Out of Print Games" section. The expansion set was not released in the same way.

A video game based on Gorkamorka was also being developed for Windows and the Dreamcast, but was scrapped shortly before the latter system was discontinued.

== Background ==
Aeons ago a Space Hulk filled with Orks on a Waaagh! (a huge Ork invasion) crashed into Angelis plowing a massive canyon, "Da Skid", and devastating the world's ecosystem. The Orks, a race who can survive just about any catastrophe, promptly decided that this was not the Waaagh! and resolved to find a way off-world as quickly as possible. They turned to their Mekboyz (Ork technicians, engineers, mechanics and the closest thing they have to scientists) for aid, who set the other Orks to work gathering up wreckage from the crash. Construction began on a huge machine, although what it was going to do differed depending on the ideas of the individual Mekboy.

The lack of unity in the construction and the machine's resemblance to a religious idol led to conflict amongst the Ork population. A religious schism occurred and factions formed based around whether believers felt the idol was of the Ork god Gork or Mork. The resulting violence destroyed the entire machine, forcing the Meks to broker an unsteady peace between the warring sides. From then on the machine would be known as Gorkamorka, at least until the day of completion.

Angelis was a suspected Necron tombworld, prompting Imperial efforts to assess the planet. At the time of the crash there were surveyors underground within the pyramids, an Imperial outpost, and an Imperial cruiser in orbit. The cruiser was brought down by the hulk with the disfigured descendants of the crash survivors became "Muties", while those inside the pyramids became primitive tribals known as "Diggas".

== Gameplay ==
The object of the game is to lead a group of warriors to fame and fortune within the setting. Players choose from a range of factions with varying motivations and abilities and fight battles against others. Most of these groups are between five and fifteen fighters with appropriate transport, known as a "mob". Battles take place in an assortment of locations and scenarios, including sieges, races, and rescue missions.

Games are designed to be played in a series and form a campaign, wherein fighters gain new abilities and suffer permanent battle injuries or death, and new warriors are purchased, or "retire" once they get to too high of a level. Players earn money ("Teef") based on how well they perform and the relative strength of their opponents. The campaigns are designed to be open-ended, allowing new players to join and leave at any time thanks to a mechanic which adjusts the rewards players receive evening out the power disparity. The closest thing to winning a campaign would be reaching the "retirement" level before other players.

== Mob types ==
Orks
A fungus/algal-based race whose culture revolves around war, Orks are the most common species in the universe of Warhammer 40,000. They are split into two factions, Gorkers and Morkers. Gorkers favour brutal weaponry while Morkers favour enhancing their vehicles.
Diggas
Tribal humans, descendants of an Imperial surveying team.
Rebel Grots
A sub-set of the orkoid species similar to goblins.
Muties
Mutants originating from the shipwrecked crew of the survey team's orbiting vessel.

== Community creations ==
Since the release of the rulebook PDFs on the Games Workshop site in 2008 the community surrounding Gorkamorka has grown substantially online resulting in the creation of a large volume of fan-made content. Several community created mob types have been added to the game:

Feral Orks
Primitive Orks with no access to higher technology, relying instead on squigs, squiggoths, and psychic powers.
Freebooters
Orks who have no affiliation with Gorkers or Morkers, preferring instead to live as pirates and mercenaries.
The Dust Rats
Humans trapped within the Imperial surveyors' outpost at the time of the space hulk's crash. Best described as somewhere between a militia and the Imperial Guard.
Snortaz
Orks who eschew vehicles in favour of large boars.
Dark Eldar
A cruel and technologically advanced race from the Warhammer 40K universe.

== Bibliography ==
- Chambers, Andy; Thorpe, Gav; Priestley, Rick (1997). Gorkamorka: Da Uvver Book. Nottingham: Games Workshop. ISBN 1-872372-55-4.

== Reception ==
The French games magazine Backstab was less than impressed with this game, complaining that the rules appeared to be a simple cut and paste from previous products. The game was given a poor rating of only 5 out of 10 with the comment, "We were expecting vehicle rules "à la Car Wars" just to feel the wind in our hair, but we end up with slow trucks and tracks whose movement is so random that now you have to be as lucky during the movement phase as you are during combat. It's funny, completely chaotic but... a bit boring. No?"

The reviewer from Pyramid #29 (Jan./Feb., 1998) stated that "First off, let me just say that if you're a member of the Green Party (by which I mean an adherent to all things Orcish and Gobliny), Gorkamorka is a game you're gonna go ape, er, Ork over."

== Reviews ==
- InQuest #33
