= Legend of the Blademasters =

Cancelled role-playing video game

- Developer(s): Ronin Entertainment
- Publisher(s): Ripcord Games
- Platform(s): Windows; Dreamcast
- Release: Cancelled

Legend of the Blademasters is a cancelled role-playing video game from Ripcord Games.

== Gameplay ==
Legend of the BladeMasters is a real-time 3D action/adventure RPG set in a fantasy world. The story follows Erik Valdemar, a 17-year-old who discovers a cursed sword while wandering through the forest. This sword is one of seven magical blades sought by five ruthless guardians. Erik must master the magic of these blades to uncover their connection to the kingdom's devastation. Erik is joined by a diverse group of adventurers, each with unique backgrounds and goals, including O'Lora Kita, a 20-year-old elf; August Winslow, an 818-year-old elemental; Lucan, a 24-year-old mountain orc; and the mysterious Knight Macon. The gameplay features non-linear quests and a battle system where players control the main character directly while issuing commands to other party members. The PC version includes a multiplayer mode for up to four players.

== Development ==
The game was in development by Ronin Entertainment a company founded in 1994 by several former LucasArts employees. Environments in the game were inspired by the classic animation of the famous director Hayao Miyazaki, such as Nausicaa, Laputa, and Princess Mononoke.

The title was scheduled to release in August 1999. This was pushed to the first quarter of 2000 and later to 2001.
