= Spec Ops: Stealth Patrol =

1999 video game

- Developer: Runecraft
- Publishers: EU: Talonsoft; NA: Take-Two Interactive
- Producer: Bill Newsham
- Designer: Stephen D. Lodge
- Programmers: Steven Caslin (lead); Phill Coleman
- Artists: David Tolley (lead); Bob Davies; Tina Palmer; Lawrie Pick; Derek Ham
- Composer: Roland Barker
- Series: Spec Ops
- Platform: PlayStation
- Release: EU: 1999; NA: May 30, 2000; UK: July 25, 2000
- Genre: Tactical shooter
- Modes: Single-player, multiplayer

Spec Ops: Stealth Patrol is a tactical shooter video game developed by Runecraft and released for PlayStation in 1999. It is the third game in the Spec Ops series.

== Reception ==
Reception

Aggregate score
Aggregator	Score
GameRankings	45%

Review scores
Publication	Score
AllGame	2/5
CNET Gamecenter	7/10
Consoles +	45%
Electronic Gaming Monthly	2/10 (Note: Two critics of Electronic Gaming Monthly gave the game each a score of 1.5/10, and another gave it 3/10.)
EP Daily	5.5/10
Game Informer	6.5/10
GameSpot	4.8/10
IGN	3/10
Jeuxvideo.com	14/20
Official U.S. PlayStation Magazine	1/5

The game received unfavorable reviews according to the review aggregation website GameRankings. The only positive review came from Jake The Snake of GamePro, who said, "Anyone who enjoys realistic third-person shooters should snag this game, especially with its crazy $9.99 price tag." (Note: GamePro gave the game three 3.5/5 scores for graphics, control and fun factor, and 4.5/5 for sound.)
