= David Tapp =

Fictional character from the Saw franchise

- Saw character
- Danny Glover as David Tapp in Saw (2004)
- First appearance: Saw (2004)
- Last appearance: Dead by Daylight (2018)
- Created by: James Wan; Leigh Whannell
- Portrayed by: Danny Glover
- Voiced by: Earl Alexander (Saw: The Video Game); Dave Blake (Dead by Daylight)

In-universe information
- Children: Michael Tapp
- Status: Deceased

Detective David Tapp is a fictional character from the Saw film franchise, portrayed by Danny Glover. Introduced in Saw (2004), he is a police detective investigating a series of crime scenes linked to the same murderer, later revealed to be the Jigsaw Killer, and serves as one of the film's protagonists.

Tapp has also made appearances through archived footage and from being mentioned in Saw III (2006), Saw IV (2007), and Saw V (2008). He appeared as a playable character in both Saw: The Video Game (2009), in which he was voiced by Earl Alexander, and Dead by Daylight (2016), in which he was voiced by Dave Blake.

== Appearances ==
=== In film ===
In Saw, David Tapp is a police detective who investigates a series of crime scenes linked to the same murderer. The victims have been placed in to traps that attempt to teach them to appreciate their life, a quality they decidedly lack. The victims who fail these "tests" have a jigsaw piece cut out of their bodies. This has earned the killer the alias "The Jigsaw Killer" by newspaper writer Oswald McGillicutty. Saw II later reveals these missing pieces have been intended to show the missing survival instinct of Jigsaw's victims.

At one of the crime scenes, Tapp and his partner, Detective Steven Sing, discover a penlight with fingerprints on it. Forensics indicate that the fingerprints belong to Dr. Lawrence Gordon, who is taken to the police station for questioning. Saw V later revealed that Jigsaw accomplice Mark Hoffman had planted this penlight to arise suspicion on Lawrence. While a few victims have already been discovered, one victim named Amanda Young manages to survive her test. Lawrence watches while Tapp interrogates Amanda for her testimony. After hearing her testimony, Tapp gives Lawrence a ride home and becomes more suspicious that Lawrence is Jigsaw.

Tapp recovers and studies the video tape left at Amanda's trap location and deciphers the location of Jigsaw's lair. Tapp and Sing find Jigsaw in his lair, but fail to arrest him due to Jigsaw non-fatally slashing Tapp's neck and Sing falling victim to one of Jigsaw's traps. Following Sing's death, Tapp becomes unstable and begins to obsess over catching Jigsaw, causing him to be discharged from the police force and to be divorced from his wife.

As Jigsaw was able to hide his identity when his lair was raided, Tapp still believes that Lawrence is Jigsaw, and continues to spend much of his time harassing and pestering him. During this time, he had hired a freelance photographer named Adam Stanheight. Using the name "Bob", he paid Adam $200 a night to observe Lawrence. Soon after this, Adam and Lawrence are both abducted by the Jigsaw Killer, while Tapp is unaware of this. His obsession causes him to stake out Lawrence's home; he uses a video camera to watch it from another apartment. During this, Tapp sees Zep Hindle at the Gordons' house and then hears gunshots coming from the house. Tapp responds and discovers that Alison Gordon and her daughter Diana are being held hostage by Zep. A gunfight ensues, allowing Alison and Diana to escape. Tapp chases Zep to the site of another Jigsaw game, later revealed to be Lawrence's trap. Before discovering the trap site, Zep and Tapp engage in a brief struggle that ends with Zep shooting Tapp in the chest and leaving him to die.

In Saw III, Tapp is seen during the montage of the first three films at the very end of the film. In Saw IV, the scene where Officer Daniel Rigg is watching Jill Tuck's interrogation at the Metropolitan Police Department features a picture of Tapp. He is briefly seen as Rigg looks through a folder containing pictures of several police officers he has lost.

In Saw V, a memorial service is held for the deceased officers from the Jigsaw murders. Tapp's police picture is among the pictures of the deceased officers. Tapp also appears in a flashback, inquiring Lawrence about the penlight Hoffman planted. Danny Glover was originally set to make a cameo appearance as Tapp in Saw V, but could not show up due to scheduling issues. The scene was originally for Tapp to attend Seth Baxter's murder scene, but was changed with Hoffman instead.

For Spiral: From the Book of Saw, it was briefly played around the possibility of having Tapp be related to Detective Zeke Banks, the main protagonist of the film, but according to co-writer Josh Stolberg, the idea did not "pass the smell test".

=== In video games ===
==== Saw: The Video Game ====
In the video game adaptation of Saw (2009), set after the events of the first film, Tapp is revealed to have survived his gunshot wound and is healed back to health by Jigsaw. He is brought to the abandoned Whitehurst Asylum where he is placed in the reverse bear trap Amanda Young was in. He quickly escapes after Jigsaw scolds him for his lack of appreciation for his life and the lives of others. Upon escaping, Tapp ventures through the asylum where he faces others during their tests. Some of these tests involve Tapp in numerous ways. Tapp's first test is to save Amanda, the woman he interrogated during Saw, unbeknownst to him that she had become Jigsaw's secret apprentice. Upon saving her, she stages her kidnapping by another Jigsaw apprentice called Pighead, and Tapp moves to his next test. The second test is for Jennings Foster, a fellow officer of Tapp's who had committed a hit-and-run which he framed an innocent person for. A conflicted Tapp saves Jennings who runs away and blames Tapp for being there.

David Tapp as he appears in Saw: The Video Game. Tapp is shown in the reverse bear trap.

Tapp's third test is for Melissa Sing, the widow of Tapp's former partner Steven Sing who has since become a neglectful mother to her son. Jigsaw informs her that Tapp had ignored calling for backup or getting a search warrant when searching Jigsaw's lair in the first Saw film, a careless step which was the reason Steven was killed. Believing Tapp could have prevented his partner's death, Melissa began to blame him for her misfortunes. Upon Tapp finding and saving her, Melissa leaves Tapp to deal with his other tests.

Tapp proceeds to save Oswald McGillicutty, a newspaper writer who coined the alias "Jigsaw", and begins to accuse Tapp of being Jigsaw. After saving Oswald, Tapp rescues Obi, an arsonist who wanted to be tested by Jigsaw. Tapp then proceeds to save his sixth victim, Jeff, who was in the drill trap when Tapp and Sing had raided Jigsaw's lair during the first film. After he survived his first test, Jeff became suicidal after Tapp harassed him to discover Jigsaw's identity. This caused Jeff to be placed in his second trap in which Tapp saves him.

After saving all of the victims in the asylum, Tapp kills Pighead and proceeds to Jigsaw. He labels Tapp as a murderer for killing Pighead and others in Whitehurst. Tapp finds and chases Jigsaw but finds two doors labeled "Truth" and "Freedom". If the player chooses the "Freedom" door, Tapp escapes and is labeled as a hero, but he kills himself soon after due to the stress of not being able to catch Jigsaw. If the player chooses the "Truth" door, Tapp chases Jigsaw and catches him, but he finds that it is Melissa. A tape recorder informs Tapp that Melissa was assigned by Jigsaw to watch over Tapp's test and that her son would be killed if she did not. Melissa then breaks free from Tapp but is killed by a tripwire trap, similar to the one in which her husband Steven was killed. Burdened by Melissa's death, Tapp becomes insane and is left in a functional asylum where he still believes he is playing Jigsaw's games.

==== Saw II: Flesh & Blood ====
Tapp is not featured in the sequel, Saw II: Flesh & Blood, but he is mentioned several times. It is revealed that the "Freedom" ending of the first game is the canonical one, due to a newspaper mentioning Tapp's escape from Whitehurst and subsequent suicide. Throughout most of the game, players control Tapp's estranged son Michael, who tries to find the cause of his father's death, which leads to him also coming into conflict with Jigsaw. Michael comes across his father's files, detailing events from the Saw film and game. There are also audio tapes made by Tapp both before and after his Whitehurst Asylum tests that can be found throughout the game which detail his investigation of the Jigsaw Killer and his gradually building obsession, beginning with the discovery of Cecil' body. It is also revealed that Tapp felt guilty for killing Pighead in the first game, not knowing if the person in the costume had a family or if he was forced to work for Jigsaw.

==== Dead by Daylight ====
David Tapp is the survivor featured in "The Saw Chapter" downloadable content for the video game Dead by Daylight, released on January 23, 2018.

== Characterization ==
Initially, Tapp is introduced in Saw as a typical police figure. When investigating the Jigsaw murders, Tapp begins to overlook police procedures and protocols in order to apprehend Jigsaw. This eventually gets his partner murdered and his own throat slashed. Tapp then becomes mentally unstable and develops an extreme obsession with Jigsaw to avenge his partner. This evolution in Tapp's character eventually becomes his tragic flaw that leads to many misfortunes. The immediate consequences for this are his divorce from his wife and his discharge from the police force. UGO described Tapp as "A good man who was driven mad by evil circumstances ..." and noted the choice he had between saving victims and catching Jigsaw.

=== Physical appearance ===
Tapp is shown to be an older male in his mid-50s, around 6 feet tall (1.83 m), during the first film's timeline. In contrast to many horror and action games, Tapp is not portrayed as superhuman or physically superior in any way. Being older, he is less fit and therefore inferior in combat situations. This is shown in Saw when Tapp loses a fistfight to Zep Hindle, which results in Tapp being shot in the chest. In Saw: The Video Game, Tapp has a hard time wielding heavy weapons and is usually slower in attacking than his opponents. Tapp's most distinguishing attribute, his thickly scarred neck, was acquired early in Saw; his scars have made his voice hoarse. Similar to other detectives in the Saw franchise, Tapp is seen wearing civilian clothing while on the police force; the exception is Saw V which shows a photograph of him in his uniform.

Reviewer Byron Hinson felt that Tapp's rendition in the Saw: The Video Game looked nothing like Danny Glover's Tapp from the film. He said that Tapp looked many years younger but partially blamed this on poor character textures and drawings. MobyGames felt that while Earl Alexander did well at voicing Tapp for the game, he felt he sounded nothing like Danny Glover, which detracted from the game experience and pointed out the contradiction of Tapp's clear voice in the game despite his scarred throat. The reviewer went as far as to jokingly compare Earl Alexander's voice as being closer to Samuel L. Jackson's (who later joined the franchise as Marcus Banks in Spiral) than Danny Glover's.

== Danny Glover ==
During an interview with Spike, Danny Glover commented on his character, David Tapp, and his obsession, saying, "What happens in the process of trying to find him, I'm overcome because of this obsession I have. I mean most police detectives at least provide you with the image that they know everything, and they're so heady to some extents, so above the others that we can figure this stuff out. But the process of figuring this stuff out, as I come closer to this, I come closer to something else that's happening and maybe I come closer to my own fear to some extent. And certainly my worst fears come to bear when I'm shot, and wounded, and my partner is killed. Then there's another level of obsession that now translates itself into this film or becomes apparent in this film. And the obsession that's connected with anger and guilt, to some extent, along with fear is pretty potent in this sense. And all of that brings about a kind of psychological breakdown, a psychotic breakdown in terms of this character. I think the obsession in some sense drives us, you know? It's obsession that drives you in a different way that's not fulfilled or completed in some way. It certainly leaves a whole 'nother kind of space there that is a very dangerous space for Tapp, the police man. Certainly coupled with the fact that my partner is lost because of essentially my own inadequacy because of me. That transforms the situation."

In the same interview, Glover commented on his attraction to the film and the prospect of playing Tapp in Saw, stating, "I saw 10–12 minutes of video of the first scene here and I was really impressed with it. I was impressed by the way of the shot, the way the camera moved, and the kind of subtlety and the language of the story. Sometimes you look at a story and you're looking at the language of the story and how does the person use language, you know? and I like all of that how does the director or the filmmaker use language in order to shape or tell the story, and I like that."
