= Spec Ops: Ranger Elite =

2001 video game

- PAL version cover art
- Developer: Runecraft Ltd.
- Publisher: Take-Two Interactive
- Producer: Stewart Gilray
- Designer: Stephen D. Lodge
- Series: Spec Ops
- Platform: PlayStation
- Release: NA: April 26, 2001; PAL: 2001
- Genre: Action
- Modes: Single-Player, Multiplayer

Spec Ops: Ranger Elite is a tactical third-person shooter video game developed by Runecraft Ltd. for the original PlayStation and published by Take-Two Interactive. It was released in North America on April 26, 2001, with a PAL version released by Talonsoft.

The game was re-released for PlayStation 3 and PlayStation Portable as a PSone Classic on July 16, 2009 and later for PS Vita in 2012.

== Gameplay ==
The player commands a two-man fireteam of United States Army Rangers across a series of military operations. Squad members are chosen from a roster of specialists, including riflemen, snipers, machine gunners, and grenadiers. Each mission requires completing objectives such as infiltration, reconnaissance, or direct assaults on enemy positions.

The game uses a third-person perspective and allows switching control between the two operatives. The second squad member is handled by artificial intelligence in single-player mode, though local split-screen cooperative play is supported. Emphasis is placed on tactical movement and weapon selection rather than high-speed action. Although it was criticized for graphics being outdated.

== Plot ==
Campaign follows a U.S. Army Ranger unit being deployed to various global conflict zones. Missions are being set in several environments such as desert compounds, urban strongholds, and jungle terrain. While the game does not feature an overarching narrative or cinematic story sequences, each mission is introduced with brief text and voiceover briefings describing the operational goals and enemy threats. These scenarios are presented as part of ongoing peacekeeping and counterterrorism duties typical of late 1990s military fiction. Each mission span in certain locations such as Alaska, Afghanistan, Egypt, and Indo-China border.

== Reception ==
Reception

Aggregate score
Aggregator	Score
Metacritic	48%

Review score
Publication	Score
GameSpot	4.5

Spec Ops: Ranger Elite received "generally unfavorable" according to review aggregation website Metacritic.

Trevor Rivers from GameSpot called the game "bare-bones", criticizing the lack of depth in squad mechanics and noting some technical issues such as poor draw-in distance, sudden enemy pop-ins, and choppy camera behavior. J.M. Vargas from PSX Nation gave the game 46% and criticized the texture details and enemy AI.

Speed Demos Archive noted the game's "slow, choppy controls, simple and boring level layout, dull graphics", but argued the co-op mode allowed for enjoyable speedrun attempts despite the game's shortcomings.
