= Saw II: Flesh & Blood =

2010 video game

- North American box art
- Developer: Zombie Studios
- Publisher: Konami
- Designers: John Williamson, Jaime Benecia
- Composers: Alex Guilbert, Morgan Green
- Series: Saw
- Engine: Unreal Engine 3
- Platforms: PlayStation 3, Xbox 360
- Release: NA: October 19, 2010; EU: October 22, 2010; AU: November 11, 2010
- Genre: Survival horror
- Mode: Single-player

Saw II: Flesh & Blood is a survival horror game developed by Zombie Studios and published by Konami for the PlayStation 3 and Xbox 360. It is the second video game in the Saw franchise, following 2009's Saw: The Video Game. It was released in October 2010 to coincide with the release of the seventh film, Saw 3D.

Saw II: Flesh & Blood picks up right after Saw: The Video Game and is set between the first and second films. It features David Tapp's son, Michael, as the new protagonist as he searches for clues behind his father's death. In doing so, Michael becomes a target of the Jigsaw Killer and his mysterious apprentice wearing a Pighead costume. The game expands technically on the previous game, also using the Unreal Engine 3. Gameplay alterations include the ability to use the environment to combat enemies and redone combat system based on quick timing and defensive techniques.

Upon release, Saw II: Flesh & Blood received unfavorable reviews, lower than the reception for the first Saw game. Critics noted an improved story but disliked the new combat system, which they felt took the excitement and suspense out of the game. A Microsoft Windows version was announced, but never released. The build of the game for PC was discovered in the leak of 12 terabytes of Steam files in August 2026.

== Gameplay ==
Saw II retains mostly the same gameplay style as the first game, being primarily a third-person survival horror game with action elements. Puzzles of the original game return, such as the "circuit puzzles", though instead of matching them with the same color, the player needs to match wires of opposite color (red to yellow and vice versa). Lockpicking returns, but uses a new minigame that has the player manipulate the tumblers to unlock. Environmental puzzles are also presented in a new way, such as having to turn a flashlight on-and-off in certain areas to show certain clues. Quick-time traps are back; in addition to shotguns being placed behind doors, swinging scythes, closing walls, and loose floorboards are placed throughout certain environments for the player to avoid by pressing a button in a timely fashion.

For the sequel, the combat system was simplified from the original game, now consisting of quick-time events whenever the player encounters an enemy, with varying lengths of time depending on the weapon the player is carrying. Puzzle-based combat encourages the player to use traps or the environment to execute enemies such as opening an elevator shaft as an enemy charges into it to kill them.

The "Case Files" from the first game return. The subject of the files are varied but some focus on David Tapp's testimonies on his raid of Jigsaw's lair and his entrapment in Whitehurst Asylum. A new collectible scattered throughout the game are small Billy dolls that can be found, though are not required. Players are able to solve more difficult puzzles in hard to reach areas to obtain the dolls. Multiple endings return, but this time around players must complete the game again in its entirety to unlock a different ending due to the decisions made during the game that affect the ending.

== Synopsis ==
=== Setting ===
Saw II: Flesh & Blood is set between the first game and the second film in the series. The new protagonist, Michael, is the son of David Tapp, who begins to seek the cause of his father's death which eventually leads him into conflict with the Jigsaw Killer and his apprentice Pighead. The game takes the player to numerous locations including hotels, factories, sewers, and other places to pursue Jigsaw and find clues behind David Tapp's death.

=== Plot ===
The first part of the game involves Campbell Iman, a drug addict placed in the "Venus flytrap" who has to cut beneath his right eye to retrieve a key to stop the deadly mechanism. He then has to go through numerous, deadly traps in order to retrieve his long lost son, who is also a drug addict, including throwing a man off a ledge for his own survival. Before finding his son, the player is forced to choose either sacrificing Campbell for the sake of a stranger, or saving himself.

After Campbell's sections, the game then cuts to Michael Tapp at his father David's apartment after his suicide. He sees Chief of Police Henry Jacobs, a detective named Joseph Poltzer, and David's reclusive neighbor Sarah Blalok. Michael also sees Jennings Foster, a forensics specialist who was a survivor of the first Saw game. Michael is then kidnapped by Pighead and forced to play Jigsaw's game in order to investigate his father's death. After being abandoned by another victim, Solomon Bates, Michael is given another chance. The first victim Michael must save is a college student named Griff whom his father arrested for raping his professor, now trapped in a room full of explosives. Michael continues through the hotel, traversing traps, and rescuing a pedophile named Zeke from a glass box similar to the one from Saw II, though he passes out from blood loss and is dragged away by Pighead. Michael then finds Henry in a trap that will cause a loaded gun to go off in his mouth, and learns that he is corrupt and has been selling drugs on the street. Upon being saved, Henry pretends to be grateful but later meets up with Joseph, and the two decide to kill Michael to ensure their corruption is kept secret. Michael then saves Sarah (whom he met earlier but who turns out to be a drug addict) from being drowned in a glass case. Upon being freed, Sarah flees and Michael continues through the hotel to save his next victim.

While attempting to confront Michael, Joseph is kidnapped by Pighead and is forced into a vise trap which Michael must save him from. An ungrateful Joseph leaves Michael, who is led to a factory to find the next victim. In the factory, Michael is attacked by Henry but manages to escape. He is then attacked by Zeke, whose hands have been replaced with bladed prosthetics by Jigsaw, and is forced to kill him. Michael next saves Carla, a hospital intern from the first Saw film, from an elevator trap which would have ripped her in half. It is revealed she was smuggling drugs from the hospital to sell illegally. Michael's last victim is Solomon, who is revealed to be the third partner of John Kramer and Art. Solomon altered finances and forged books to cover for a larger group of criminals. Upon being saved by Michael, Solomon reveals that Henry, Joseph, Sarah, Carla, and himself are all part of a large drug operation. It was also revealed that David discovered this operation while chasing Jigsaw but was more interested in pursuing him rather than corrupt cops. Michael also admits to stealing his father's files on Jigsaw, and used them to advance his reporting career. The files, in which David admitted that his raid on Jigsaw's lair was without a warrant, were used as grounds to fire David by Henry in order to cover up his drug ring.

Along the way, Henry murders Carla to silence her, but is later killed himself by Pighead. Solomon is pushed into a pit of needles by Pighead and never seen again. Joseph also kills Sarah in a train station, but is later killed himself by Michael. Michael then spots Jigsaw, and chases him to a room where it is revealed that Campbell, the man from the beginning, has chosen Michael's fate by either sacrificing or saving himself.

=== Finale ===
After killing Joseph and chasing Jigsaw to the final room of the game, the game flashes back to the protagonist of the first act, Campbell, who was left with a decision early in the game. Jigsaw reveals that Michael is the "stranger" whose fate is in the hands of Campbell. Depending on the choice the player made early in the game, there are two possible endings:

If the player chose the Path of Blood and saved Campbell, he will get on the elevator and Michael will be crushed to death by the surrounding walls. Jigsaw then confronts Campbell and says he is now free and can find his son outside. However, Campbell suffers a breakdown and convinces himself that his son can never live properly in a world with people like Jigsaw. Campbell becomes belligerent and attempts to attack Jigsaw, only to be killed by a falling scythe. Jigsaw approaches his corpse and mutters "game over".

If the player chose the Path of Flesh early in the game, Michael will get into the elevator and a tape will play, claiming that he and Jigsaw are similar and would both like to give justice to a world of criminals. Michael then faces two doors; one leads Michael to freedom and the chance to use the evidence found by his father to print the story of Jigsaw and the drug cartel. The other door reveals a Pighead costume and an offer to help people see the truth inside themselves, implying Michael can become another Jigsaw apprentice. The choice made is not revealed to the player.

== Development ==
A close-up shot of Campbell held in the series' iconic "Venus Fly Trap". He is in a dark room and grabbing at the trap with a severely injured right eye.

Following the release of the first Saw video game, Konami stated intentions to turn the franchise license into their next great survival horror franchise. Relying on visual intensity rather than psychological terror, Konami felt both Saw and their other survival horror franchise, Silent Hill, could survive together without competing. Plans for a sequel were further evident when a cryptic "case file" was placed in the first game and an internet job listing by Zombie Inc. for a focus group was released, both pointing to a possible April announcement of a sequel in Los Angeles via press release.

The game was officially announced at Konami's Gamers Night 2010 by a trailer and details accompanying after. The trailer depicted Jigsaw voicing over an anonymous man in the "Venus flytrap" cutting his eye out to retrieve a key before failing and being killed. In the same press event, details followed including the new setting between Saw: The Video Game and Saw II as well as the basic storyline of David Tapp's son and protagonist Michael investigating his death and encountering Jigsaw along the way. Martin Schneider, European Marketing & PR Director for Konami, stated that "[the] original Saw video game gave horror fans and gamers a new outlet to advance their favorite genre, but left them wanting more. Saw 2 will give it to them, but be careful for what you wish for! Our successful partnership with Lionsgate allows us to advance the survival horror genre, giving players the most intense look into the Saw universe ever."

Saw II: Flesh & Blood was displayed by Konami at the Electronic Entertainment Expo 2010. At the event, Tobin Bell was announced to return to voice the Jigsaw Killer as well as lend his likeness to the game; in addition, the subtitle Flesh & Blood was confirmed. The game was also shown at the 2010 San Diego Comic-Con at the Konami booth. In an interview, producer Jaime Benecia stated that all of the characters and plotlines present in the game had to be approved by Lionsgate to fit the canon of the films.

Saw II: Flesh & Blood was released in North America on October 19, 2010, for the Xbox 360 and PlayStation 3, ten days before the release of the seventh film, Saw 3D.

== Critical response ==
Reception

Aggregate score
Aggregator	Score	
Aggregator	PS3	Xbox 360
Metacritic	45/100	47/100

Review scores
Publication	Score	
Publication	PS3	Xbox 360
Destructoid	7/10	N/A
Game Informer	4.5/10	4.5/10
GamePro	N/A	2.5/5
GameRevolution	D	D
GameZone	3.5/10	N/A
IGN	4.5/10	4.5/10
Official Xbox Magazine (US)	N/A	4/10
PALGN	6/10	N/A
PlayStation: The Official Magazine	6/10	N/A
VideoGamer.com	5/10	5/10
The Daily Telegraph	2/10	2/10
Metro	3/10	N/A

Upon release, Flesh & Blood received "generally unfavorable reviews", much less than the original Saw game, on both platforms according to the review aggregation website Metacritic.

Game Informer said that the game "doesn't just take a step backwards from the first game – it performs a reverse swan dive off a balcony into a swimming pool filled with razorblades". Anthony Gallegos of IGN gave the game a very negative review. He felt the new combat system was actually worse than that of its predecessor. He reasoned the quick-time events rob the game of any suspense and disrupt the horror atmosphere, which he also criticized separately. Gallegos felt the game was poorly designed and disliked the difficult puzzles.

411Mania gave the Xbox 360 version a score of five out of ten and said that it "isn't a horrible game. It's just the definition of a budget title. It's entertaining for a couple of hours, but after that it becomes so repetitious that you'll lose any interest in the game and want to move on to something else. If you need to play this game, make it a rental." Metro gave the PlayStation 3 version a score of three out of ten and said, "Considerably worse than the thoroughly unremarkable original, this is a horror game but not quite in the way it was intended." The Daily Telegraph gave the game a score of two out of ten and said, "There's a temptation to end this review with a play on Jigsaw's famous 'I want to play a game' line, but to call Flesh & Blood a game would be doing a disservice to games, and 'I want to play a train wreck' doesn't have the same ring to it."
