= Spec Ops: Rangers Lead the Way =

1998 video game

- Developer: Zombie Studios
- Publisher: Ripcord Games
- Producer: Sandra B. Smith
- Designers: Eric Church; Javier Garavito; Mark Long
- Programmer: Wyeth Ridgway
- Artist: Mel Guymon
- Composers: Roland Barker; Joseph Zajonc
- Series: Spec Ops
- Platform: Windows
- Release: NA: April 22, 1998; EU: May 1998
- Genre: Tactical shooter
- Modes: Single-player, multiplayer

Spec Ops: Rangers Lead The Way (Spec Ops: Ranger Assault in Europe and Australia) is a tactical shooter video game developed by Zombie Studios and published by Ripcord Games exclusively for Windows. Players take control of United States Army Rangers; the game's subtitle is the Ranger motto. It is the first game in the Spec Ops series.

== Gameplay ==
Spec Ops: Rangers Lead The Way is a tactical shooter game.

== Development ==
Spec Ops: Rangers Lead the Way was designed to be more of a simulation than previous video games involving the control of ground forces. The developers chose the United States Army Rangers as the subject because of their dangerous missions, aggressive combat tactics, and high casualty rates.

Zombie conducted extensive research for the game, including consulting and using motion capture with a former special forces instructor, attending live fire drills at Fort Lewis, and photographing real soldiers for texture mapping.

Originally the game was to be published for both Windows and PlayStation by BMG Interactive. The PlayStation version was to stream data in order to eliminate load times and utilize true 3D-clipping in order to eliminate tearing in polygonal seams. In mid-1997 BMG Interactive shut down its North American operations, and as 1998 opened the game was still left without a publisher. Spec Ops: Rangers Lead the Way was also originally planned to have no music. BMG executive producer Mike Suarez commented, "Why waste money on a CD-quality soundtrack? We're focusing on what's more critical to the gameplay and giving it a production value that more than makes up for the absence of music."

The game was picked up by Ripcord Games, which opted to release it only for Windows.

== Reception ==
Spec Ops: Rangers Lead the Way

Aggregate score
Aggregator	Score
GameRankings	77%

Review scores
Publication	Score
CNET Gamecenter	7/10
Computer Games Strategy Plus	3/5
Computer Gaming World	3/5
Computer and Video Games	4/5
Edge	7/10
Game Informer	7.5/10
GameRevolution	B+
GameSpot	6.8/10
Next Generation	4/5
PC Zone	88%

The game received favorable reviews according to the review aggregation website GameRankings. Next Generation said that the game "succeeds at delivering the tension and excitement of a true Army Ranger mission."

By 2001, the game generated more than $29 million in revenue.

== Expansion ==
Spec Ops: Ranger Team Bravo
- Developer: Zombie Studios
- Publisher: Ripcord Games
- Series: Spec Ops
- Platform: Microsoft Windows
- Release: NA: October 23, 1998
- Genre: Tactical shooter
- Modes: Single-player, multiplayer

Spec Ops: Ranger Team Bravo is an expansion pack developed by Zombie Studios and was published by Ripcord Games. The expansion launched exclusively for Microsoft Windows on October 23, 1998. The add-on features three new campaigns in Bosnia, Vietnam, and Iraq, and a multiplayer module.

=== Reception ===
Spec Ops: Ranger Team Bravo

Aggregate score
Aggregator	Score
GameRankings	59%

Review scores
Publication	Score
Computer Games Strategy Plus	1.5/5
Computer Gaming World	2.5/5
GameSpot	6.4/10
PC Accelerator	5/10

Ranger Team Bravo received more mixed reviews than the original Spec Ops according to GameRankings.
