= Going Postal: The Legacy Foretold =

2025 documentary film by Tad Sallee and Jason Sikorsky

- Directed by: Tad Sallee; Jason Sikorsky
- Produced by: Tad Sallee; Jason Sikorsky; Atreyu Hasenstab; Matthew Hall; Angelica Maxwell; Carla O'Brien
- Starring: Vince Desi; Mike Jaret-Schachter; Zack Ward; Uwe Boll; Jon St. John; Carter Cruise; Chris Coppola; Larry Thomas
- Edited by: Tad Sallee; Jason Sikorsky; Bao Nguyen
- Music by: Dylan Mixer
- Production company: PlayTest Network
- Distributed by: PlayTest Network
- Release dates: March 29, 2025 (Phoenix Film Festival); May 30, 2025 (United States)
- Running time: 122 minutes
- Country: United States
- Language: English
- Budget: $200,000

Going Postal: The Legacy Foretold is a 2025 American documentary film directed by Tad Sallee and Jason Sikorsky profiling the 25 year long history about the Arizona gaming company Running with Scissors and its video game franchise Postal.

The film premiered at the Phoenix Film Festival on March 29, 2025, and it was available for streaming on May 30, 2025. It received generally favorable reviews.

== Synopsis ==
In 1997, Vince Desi, co-founder of Running with Scissors (RWS), released Postal, a top-down shooter inspired by arcade titles like Robotron. The game was named after the phrase "going postal", which had entered public discourse after a series of shootings by U.S. postal workers in the late 1980s and early 1990s. Desi, who had spent years developing licensed children’s games in franchises like Sesame Street and Tom and Jerry, wanted to take his company in a new direction. The result was Postal, which featured violent gameplay and quickly attracted attention.

The game debuted at E3 and initially received interest from players and retailers. That changed after CNN ran a segment on it, prompting widespread backlash. Senator Joe Lieberman condemned the game on the Senate floor. Shortly after, the U.S. Postmaster General issued a cease-and-desist letter regarding the game’s title, although RWS had trademarked "Postal" before the U.S. Postal Service had. The controversy led to the game being banned in 14 countries and removed from shelves within weeks. As a result, RWS lost its contracts with family-friendly brands and embraced its identity as an independent, uncensored studio.

Following the backlash, RWS began working on a sequel. In 2003, they released Postal 2, a first-person shooter that expanded on the series' provocative themes. Reviews were largely negative, but the game developed a cult following. It became especially popular in Russia, where Desi and vice-president Mike Jaret-Schachter (Mike J) later traveled for a fan signing event. Many attendees were too young to have been able to purchase the game.

The game's notoriety also drew attention during public discussions of real-world violence and media influence. In 2006, the shooter responsible for the Dawson College Shooting in Montreal was reported to be a fan of Postal 2. Politicians and commentators cited the game in ongoing debates over video game content and regulation. However, in 2011, the U.S. Supreme Court ruled in Brown v. EMA that video games are protected under the First Amendment, limiting legislative efforts to restrict sales based on violent content.

In the mid-2000s, German filmmaker Uwe Boll approached RWS with the idea of adapting Postal into a movie. Despite a $20 million budget and theatrical scenes shot with Hollywood actors, the film was released on only 20 screens and received little marketing support. It was a commercial failure, and RWS expressed disappointment that the movie, Postal (2007), did not expand the franchise’s audience as hoped.

The team began work on Postal III, in collaboration with Russian publisher Akella. RWS retained creative control, while Akella managed development. The game was to include appearances by Ron Jeremy and Jennifer Walcott. However, the 2008 global financial crisis hit Akella hard, leading to layoffs and the loss of experienced developers. The finished game suffered from numerous bugs, design changes, and a new voice actor for the main character. Fans criticized the shift to a third-person perspective and the game’s tone. RWS later disavowed the release.

By 2019, RWS returned to the series with Postal 4: No Regerts, revealed at PAX East. There, fans spoke with Desi and Jaret-Schachter, sharing stories of how the games helped them through difficult periods. For some, the series provided an outlet for stress; others saw it as a form of transgressive humor that pushed back against cultural norms.

Over two decades after its debut, RWS continues to develop new titles and maintain a dedicated player community.

== Production ==
Directors Tad Sallee and Jason Sikorsky initially planned to create a short series about RWS's history. During a casual meeting over ramen with Mike J, vice0president of RWS, the directors were struck by the company's unconventional history and decided the story was too expansive for short-form content, prompting them to pursue a feature length documentary.

The directors initially launched a crowdfunding campaign with a goal of $25,000, but ultimately raised around $42,000. The film ended with an estimated budget of $200,000.

Production faced multiple delays, including those caused by the COVID-19 pandemic, ultimately extending the timeline to five years. Initially edited using the Adobe Creative Suite, the film was later rebuilt in DaVinci Resolve for color grading. Originally planned to conclude with the successful release of Postal 4, the film's ending had to be reworked after the game received poor reviews. As a result, the production was extended even further. The final was assembled from over 24 terabytes of footage, shot across seven international locations, including the United States, Denmark, and the United Kingdom.

== Release ==
The film premiered to a sold out showing on March 29, 2025, at the Phoenix Film Festival and was available for streaming and Blu-ray on May 30, 2025.

== Reception ==
=== Critical response ===
The film received positive reviews from critics and fans. Alan Ng of Film Threat praised the film's handling of the subject of video game related violence, saying "... with Going Postal: The Legacy Foretold's two-hour runtime, the story of Postal is riveting. It balances the sheer insanity of the Running With Scissors crew to create an ultra-violent game against the ever-present controversy that violent video games are the cause of mass shootings. Watch the film, and you might be hard pressed to come to a firm conclusion on the matter."

Although mostly well received, the documentary like the game series itself was not void of controversy. Calvin Kemph of The Twin Geeks called for the film's cancellation, saying "These are hateful games... There is a documentary to make here, that directly addresses the full truth of what these games were, how offensive and culturally repugnant their ideas became, and how they were not victims of the violence in games discourse, but unfortunate benefactors of those ideas."

=== Accolades and Film Festivals ===
Festival	Screening	Category	Result	Ref(s)
Phoenix Film Festival	March 29, 2025	Official Selection	Nominated	
Arizona International Film Festival	April 6, 2025	Official Selection	Nominated	
Santa Fe International Film Festival	February 19, 2025	Official Selection	Nominated	
Florence Film Awards	February 5, 2025	Official Selection	Nominated	
East Village New York Film Festival	January 26, 2025	Official Selection	Nominated	
Anatolia International Film Festival	January 26, 2025	Official Selection	Nominated	
Lytham International Film Festival	August 22, 2025	Official Selection	Nominated	
International Gold Awards	February 5, 2025	Official Selection	Nominated	
Pickering Canada International Film Festival	July 26, 2025	Official Selection	Nominated	
New York Movie Awards	February 5, 2025	Best Feature Documentary	Won	
Milan Gold Awards	February 5, 2025	Best Feature Documentary	Won	
Digital Griffix Film Awards	May 22, 2025	Best Documentary Feature	Nominated	
MLC Awards of Green Bay	August 30, 2025	Best Editing	Nominated	
MLC Awards of Green Bay	August 30, 2025	Best Documentary	Nominated	
Folkestone Film Festival	March 24, 2025	Best Documentary	Nominated	
