= Jennifer Walcott =

American glamour model and actress (born 1977)

Playboy centerfold appearance
- August 2001
- Preceded by: Kimberley Stanfield
- Succeeded by: Dalene Kurtis

Personal details
- Born: Jennifer Walcott Archuleta; May 8, 1977 Youngstown, Ohio
- Height: 5 ft 3 in (1.60 m)

Jennifer Walcott Archuleta (born May 8, 1977) is an American actress, model and media personality. She is best known as Playboy magazine's Playmate of the Month for August 2001.

== Early life ==
Walcott was born to a family of four children in Youngstown, Ohio. She was a cheerleader growing up and in 1995, graduated from Lowellville High School. She aspired to be a veterinarian, due to her love for animals.

In October 1996, at the age of nineteen, she visited Los Angeles, California and decided to move there working two jobs while taking business classes at Santa Monica College.

== Career ==
In early 2001, Walcott attended a Playboy Mansion party as a makeup artist working an event and was taken notice of by an editor. She was then offered a photoshoot in mid-2001, where she was chosen as the Playmate of the Month for August 2001. After her appearance she began appearing regularly in Playboy magazine, she was also chosen by Carmen Electra to model for her celebrity guest photoshoot on Playboy.com. She was also featured a part of Playboy's Xtreme Team.

After her success with Playboy she went on to feature on the cover of many other magazines including; 994, American Curves, AtoZ, Flirt, Hers, Holistic Health, Iron Man, Matco, Maxim, Moves, Muscle & Fitness, People, Performance Audio and Sound, Physical, Planet Muscle, Stun, VP Racing Fuel and many others. She began appearing in music videos for several artists including in video's for; Justin Timberlake, Marc Anthony and Sterephonics.

In 2005, Walcott alongside Destiny Davis and Scarlett Keegan were given keys to Las Vegas, Nevada, by the mayor in appreciation for posing for a calendar promoting the city.

She began a career in television, making various appearances on shows such as; Best Damn Sports Show Period, Dog Eat Dog, E! True Hollywood Story, Entertainment Tonight, Howard Stern, MTV Cribs, Ripley's Believe it or Not, Russian Roulette, Street Smarts, Weakest Link and Wild On!. In 2006, Walcott was chosen as a finalist to compete in the WWE Diva Search reality competition series, but dropped out before filming due to the shows schedule conflicting with other projects, she was replaced by Erica Chevillar. In 2009, she began co-hosting Arizona local advice show, Mom Time.

She began acting in 2005, appearing in American Pie: Band Camp. In 2008, she appeared in the movie The Pool Boys. She made several appearances as the official Postal Babe on Running with Scissors' official website. She had cameo roles as herself in Postal III and in Postal 2: Paradise Lost.

== Personal life ==
Walcott is married to former NFL player Adam Archuleta. They have three children together. She works closely with many charities, volunteering at the Ronald McDonald House in Washington, D.C.

She is also a poet, one of her poems won an official statewide Reader's Digest contest.

== Filmography ==
Film and television
Year	Title	Role	Notes
2001	Playboy Playmates: Unwrapped	Self; Playboy Playmate	Direct to DVD
2001	The Other Half	Self; guest	1 episode
2001	The Big Show	Self; guest	1 episode
2001	Best Damn Sports Show Period!	Self; guest	1 episode
2001	Wild On!	Self; guest	1 episode
2002	Weakest Link	Self; contestant	1 episode
2002	Ripley's Believe it or Not!	Self; guest	1 episode
2002	Dog Eat Dog	Self; contestant	1 episode
2002	MTV's Spring Break 2002	Self; feature	TV special
2002	MTV Cribs	Self; feature	1 episode
2002	Playboy Video Playmate Calendar 2003	Self; Miss November	Direct to DVD
2002	Playboy: Prime Time Playmates	Self; Playboy Playmate	Direct to DVD
2002	Playboy: Barefoot Beauties	Self; Playboy Playmate	Direct to DVD
2003	Playboy: Hot Lips, Hot Legs	Self; Playboy Playmate	Direct to DVD
2003	Playboy: Celebrity Photographers	Self; Playboy Playmate	Direct to DVD
2003	Russian Roulette	Self; contestant	1 episode
2004	Playboy: No Boys Allowed 2	Self; Playboy Playmate	Direct to DVD
2004	Street Smarts	Self; contestant	1 episode
2005	Howard Stern	Self; guest	1 episode
2005	Entertainment Tonight	Self; guest	1 episode
2005	American Pie: Band Camp	Laurie	
2006	Playboy: No Boys Allowed 3 Sweet Sensations	Self; Playboy Playmate	Direct to DVD
2006	Playboy X Mates Volume 1: BMX & Wakeboards	Self; Playboy Playmate	Direct to DVD
2006	WWE Diva Search	Self; contestant	Quit, 1 episode
2007	Playboy X Mates Volume 2: ATV & Skydiving	Self; Playboy Playmate	Direct to DVD
2008	The Pool Boys	Caitlin Stenson	
2009	E! News	Self; guest	1 episode
2009	E! True Hollywood Story	Self; guest	1 episode
2009	Mom Time	Self; co-host	Recurring role
2017	Playmate Anthology	Self; feature	Documentary

Music videos
Year	Title	Artist	Role
2001	Have A Nice Day	Sterephonics	Model

Video games
Year	Title	Role	Notes
2011	Postal III	Self	Video game debut
2015	Postal II: Paradise Lost	Self; cameo	DLC

Irina Voronina	Lauren Michelle Hill	Miriam Gonzalez	Katie Lohmann	Crista Nicole	Heather Spytek
Kimberley Stanfield	Jennifer Walcott	Dalene Kurtis	Stephanie Heinrich	Lindsey Vuolo	Shanna Moakler
