= Seetharam Sitralu =

Indian Telugu-language Comedy drama 2024

- Theatrical release poster
- Directed by: D.Naga Sasidhar Reddy
- Written by: D.Naga Sasidhar Reddy
- Produced by: P.Partha Saradhi; D.Nagendra Reddy; Krishna Chandra Vijayabattu
- Starring: Lakshmana Murthy Ratana; Akella Raghavendra
- Cinematography: Arun Kumar Parvathaneni
- Edited by: Praneeth Kumar
- Music by: Rudra Kiran MS
- Production company: Raising Hands Productions
- Release date: 30 August 2024
- Country: India
- Language: Telugu

Seetharam Sitralu is a 2024 Indian Telugu-language Comedy drama film written and directed by D.Naga Sasidhar Reddy. The film stars Lakshmana Murthy Ratana and Akella Raghavendra.The film was produced by P.Partha Saradhi, D.Nagendra Reddy, Krishna Chandra Vijayabattu under the banner of Raising Hands Productions.

== Synopsis ==
The film opens with Yadhagiri, a notorious criminal in Kurnool City, brutally killing a man. Unbeknownst to him, a videographer captures the entire incident. Mistaking it for a staged act, the videographer approaches the body, only to be confronted by Yadhagiri, who reveals it to be a real murder. Shocked, the videographer falls into a coma, while Yadhagiri takes the camera and leaves.Several years later, Shiva, the protagonist, watches a success story on YouTube and is inspired to share his own tale one day. Shiva is a renowned professional tea master in Gundala Village, where his tea is a must-have for the villagers before they start their work.One day, Shiva encounters Paru on the roadside and instantly falls for her. While Shiva's mother suggests a proposal from a teacher, Shiva prefers not to pursue arranged marriages. However, when he sees Paru's face in the mirror, he realizes she is the same person he fell for earlier. Changing the subject, he praises teachers worldwide, and eventually, Paru accepts his proposal.To fund his wedding, Shiva seeks financial assistance from Srinu, the wealthiest person in the village, by convincing him of the auspiciousness of the event. Srinu lends him the requested 5 lakhs.However, when Paru's father, Sakram, distributes the wedding cards, relatives criticize him for agreeing to marry his daughter to a tea master. Influenced by his brother's promise to find a groom settled abroad, Sakram cancels the marriage.Shiva asks Srinu for a year to repay the debt. In need of money, he visits his friend Ravi, an editor for marriage cassette mixing, and shares his story. Ravi explains that quick money is more likely in movies than reality, leaving Shiva disheartened. In the midst of their conversation, a customer with bodyguards offers a deal to convert his grandparents' VCR cassette to CD. Seeing it as an opportunity, Shiva accepts.Having inherited his father's VCR mixing skills, Shiva, with some hurdles, successfully converts the cassette. Impressed, the customer pays him 10,000 rupees. Shiva sees this as a revolutionary idea and decides to open a VCR shop to revive his father's business. Srinu supports the plan, lending Shiva 3,00,000 rupees. Shiva promotes his business extensively to attract customers, believing there is no competition.Yadhagiri contacts Shiva to convert his murder VCR cassette into a CD, threatening him not to leak it. Tara, a girl from Hyderabad, also approaches Shiva to convert her deceased parents' wedding cassette into a CD. A romantic track develops between Shiva and Tara.Ravi urgently needs 5,00,000 rupees for his mother's operation. Shiva, who had borrowed money from someone, hands over his papers to obtain the required funds for Ravi's mother.Tragedy strikes when Shiva's shop is destroyed by a short circuit, including his equipment and data. To make matters worse, he discovers that Ravi has cheated him and fled to Goa, taking his money. Overwhelmed and lost, Shiva is devastated and realizes he has lost Yadhagiri's important cassette.Returning to his village, Shiva's mother motivates him to rebuild his tea business. Yadhagiri visits Shiva and enjoys his tea, leading him to help expand Shiva's business, renaming it Seetharam Tea Stall. Seetharam Tea Stall flourishes, gaining multiple branches

Finally, Shiva is invited to the Success Speaks show to share his inspiring journey. His speech goes viral on social media, and he reunites with Paru, falling in love once again.

== Cast ==
- Lakshmana Murthy Ratana as Shiva
- Akella Raghavendra as Paru
- Sandeep Varanasi
- Bramarambikatutika
- Kishori Dhatrak
- Delhi Rajeswari
- Krishna Murthy Vanjari

== Production ==
The film was produced by P.Partha Saradhi, D.Nagendra Reddy, Krishna Chandra Vijayabattu under the banner of Raising Hands Productions. The cinematography was done by Arun Kumar Parvathaneni while editing was handled by Praneeth Kumar and music composed by Rudra Kiran MS

== Reception ==
Suresh Rachamalla of News18 Telugu stataed that " Even though it is a small point.. the director steered the story without hesitation in telling the point he chose" and rated two point seven five out five.
