= Postal Babes =

2009 video game

- Developer: HeroCraft
- Publisher: HeroCraft
- Series: Postal
- Platforms: Android; J2ME
- Release: NA: February 2009
- Mode: Single-player

Postal Babes (stylized as POSTAL_{Babes}) is a mobile game developed for Running with Scissors by HeroCraft. It was released in February, 2009.

Though part of the Postal series of video games, the plot of Postal Babes has nothing to do with the storyline that follows The Postal Dude. Instead, this mobile game focuses on the eponymous "Postal Babes", a group of attractive fictional women who are skilled in the use of weapons and that have made appearances in other installments of the Postal series.

== Gameplay ==
Postal Babes unfolds as a side-scrolling action game combining elements of beat ’em up, shooter, and platforming genres. The gameplay alternates between two heroines, each with distinct combat styles; one wielding melee weapons and the other using firearms. The levels span a variety of mission objectives such as rescuing hostages, eliminating enemies, defusing bombs, platforming sequences, sniper segments, and escorting hostages. The total number of levels is typically cited as twelve or thirteen. Character movement and combat are optimized for older button-based mobile devices. Players can move left or right, jump in multiple directions, crouch, attack, and interact with the environment (such as opening doors). Combos are possible through chained attacks.

It includes a censored version that removes graphic elements like blood and dismemberment. Notably, the original J2ME version featured an Easter egg unlock allowing topless character sprites to be made visible through sending an SMS, this feature was omitted in later versions, though the sprite assets remained within the game files reportedly.

== Plot ==
The Postal Babes receive a message alerting them that there are some strange events taking place in the local university. The Postal Babes discover that some maniacs have taken over the university, and that they have taken first year girls as hostages. The Postal Babes must infiltrate the university and go through 12 action-packed levels to rescue the hostages. During their journey, the Postal Babes have many different weapons at their disposal, including but not limited to baseball bats, knives and machine guns.

== Development ==
The concept of Postal Babes was first publicly revealed on August 3, 2007, when Herocraft announced the game following a licensing agreement with Running with Scissors. The title was presented as a mobile adaptation of the "booth babes" promotional characters from the Postal franchise a continuation of their lore as playable heroines.
