= Tanita =

Tanita may refer to:

- Tanita (genus), genus of grasshoppers
- Tanita: Plasticine Dream, 2006 Russian adventure game
- Tanita S. Davis, American author
- Tanita Tikaram (born 1969), British singer-songwriter
