= The Real Neverending Story Part 1: Auryn Quest =

2002 video game

Auryn Quest
- Developers: Discreet Monsters; Attaction
- Publishers: Octagon Entertainment; DreamCatcher Interactive
- Release: June 12, 2002

Auryn Quest is a platforming adventure game based on Michael Ende's novel The Neverending Story and his film adaptation of the same name. Originally developed by Discreet Monsters, "bad luck and mishaps" left the company bankrupt, and the game was eventually completed by Attaction. Initially an ambitious adventure game, bankruptcy forced the release to be reworked into a first-person action, 3D platformer jump game vaguely based on its source material. The first entry in a subsequently abandoned series, it became the sole game project for Discreet Monsters.

== Development ==
=== Background ===
Discreet Monsters was founded in Germany in 1996 with only five employees, as a subsidiary of parent company 3-DD. Development on The Real Neverending Story started in 1998. The game received much media attention, who were impressed with the released demos and screenshots. The studio was considered a "New Economy shooting star". Discreet Monsters founder Siggi Kogl raised 6.5 million marks in venture capital, and had a goal of the game being in 15 languages and selling 400,000 units worldwide. The company invested into cartoon and internet TV development to expand the franchise.

=== Design ===
The game was designed so the player's actions would affect their reputation, which in turn would affect how other characters interacted with them. The company created a proprietary software called Monster Engine, which used two game engine variants; one for indoor and one for outdoor. The developers often referred to "Quake 3" when trying to describe the project they were trying to achieve. It was designed to have multiple ways of completion, and once the player had played every single combination, they could use elements from the main game to form an ongoing offline/online world called the Parallel World. Each puzzle was crafted in such a way as to be solved in at least three ways; for instance when rescuing a princess the player can either take the key from the security guard (a battle segment), convince a companion to distract the guard, or shrinking into a small device (a jump and run segment). The game took place in the land of Fantasia. The title had an emotion-based dialogue function, in which the player sees the stream-of-consciousness thoughts of their character in a conversation and click all that apply. The game was designed as the first of a series of three chapters, one released each consecutive year.

=== Challenges ===
Due to over-ambition, the game went over budget and at one point had 60 people working on it full-time. This spooked investors, who began to pull out. By September 1998, the game was expected to be released in Easter 1999. The game was shown at the 1999 E3 expo. In February 2000, a release date of that year's summer was reported. As each release date approached, it kept being pushed back until July 2000 when development was discontinued entirely. Kogl made two rounds of financing throughout development, and failed in the third in early 2001. Discreet Monsters went bankrupt and the whole team was fired.

A year later in January 2001, Kogl managed to secure the rights to the game after the bankruptcy and started a new company called Attaction, consisting of a sample of the previous company's employees. With more modest plans, and the work of the previous version already completed, the company put a six-month development schedule on the game. By March 2002, the game had not yet been given a release date. Mr Bills Adventure Land reported that the developers wanted to allow players to decide whether to play the game as an adventure or action.

=== Release and aftermath ===
Released on June 12, 2002, the game's basis in Michael Ende's novel was used extensively in the game's marketing in order to pique buyer interest. The game was made available in the major parts of Europe throughout the first half of 2002. In August, Akella had signed a contract to publish the game in Russia and countries within the Commonwealth of Independent States. The game was published in Europe by Octagon Entertainment, and by DreamCatcher Interactive in North America. The distributors' press releases made several comparisons to Myst.

In 2006, Octagon Entertainment attained the North American publishing rights to the game.

== Plot ==
The Auryn, a magical amulet used by the Childlike Empress to rule, has been stolen. The player takes the role of the Indian boy Atreyu. Only by exploring the six fantasy worlds and solving all the puzzles can the player return the Auryn. In order to complete each section, the player needs to locate 10 energy balls.

== Gameplay ==
The game has 6 levels, and has level design reminiscent of Myst. The game is largely non-violent and suitable for players as young as six. Gameplay is typical of jump and run games like Rayman.

== Critical reception ==
The game received highly positive reviews in preview articles. Upon release, the game received mixed reviews.

Edge felt the game "presents some interesting technological propositions" and successfully created believable character interactions. Level23 thought the game was an important step in the field of 3D first person action adventure games. PC Powerplay noted the overconfidence of the development team, as they explained their ambitions. MeccaWorld liked the idea of meeting interesting and strange creatures just like in the novel.

Interest surrounding the game was significant; Just Adventure reported receiving "dozens of emails concerning the fate of Siggi Koegl's labor of love", and encouraged its readers to email the developers about releasing the game in North America.

GameCaptain praised the atmospheric level design. World of Cheats felt the first person perspective suited the game well. Sputnik thought the game was successful all-round. While offering a positive review, Computer Games warned the developers that brand name recognition and nice graphics alone would not make the game a standout example in the genre. Xenosys noted that the game was impressive considering it consisted of "painstakingly assembled remnants of a failed adventure project". Internet Kurier praised the game for not aiming at the mainstream. TachAuch felt it would be a nice alternative to those who liked Myst. PC Games Portal felt it would be a nice game to play after a long day at work.

Game Chronicles criticised the "groan inducing gameplay". JeuxVideo felt the title was one of the worst the site had played in a while. GamesDesk felt the game was too poor quality to appeal to adult players, but might be a fair substitution for Rayman to younger players. GameZ felt the story behind the game was a textbook example of how things go wrong in the gaming industry. GameZone noted that if the sequels' development were predicated on the success of the first title, they had doubts that the sequels would come to pass. The Adrenaline Vault felt the developers squandered their potential to make a challenging and innovative entry in the adventure genre. Gamers.at was disappointed by the experience.
