= Disciples III: Renaissance =

2009 video game

- Developer: .dat
- Publishers: RU: Akella; EU: Kalypso Media; NA: Kalypso Media; AU: Auran Games
- Producer: Alexey Ilyin
- Designer: Dmitriy Demyanovskiy
- Programmer: Dmitriy Demyanovskiy
- Artists: Andrey Ivanchenko; Nikolay Kovalec
- Composer: Daniel Sadowski
- Platform: Microsoft Windows
- Release: RU: December 11, 2009; EU: June 25, 2010; NA: July 13, 2010; AU: July 22, 2010
- Genre: Turn-based strategy
- Modes: Single-player, multiplayer

Disciples III: Renaissance is a 2009 turn-based strategy video game developed by Russian studio .dat and published by Akella and Kalypso Media. The project was in development since the summer of 2005.

The player assumes the role of one of the lords of Nevendaar. This new episode contains three playable races, 'The Empire', 'The Legions of the Damned' and the 'Elven Alliance', with the remaining factions making an addition in planned expansions. The battle system is completely different from that of previous Disciples games. Units are able to move around the battlefield and make use of terrain for fortifications. The player's hero is highly customizable. His abilities as well as his armour and weapons can be changed. All of the equipment changes are noticeable on the actual character model.

Disciples III: Renaissance uses .dat's in-house Virtual Dream engine.

== Story ==
The story follows a character deemed The Highfather, placed in the world of Nevendaar and its inhabitants. His mind is occupied with the coming fate of his world. During this time, a star falls on the border of the Empire and is seen as a sign by the people. While prophets and other scholars in the universe attempt to solve its mystery, other races such as humans, elves, and demons send their own heroes to find it. One such hero, Bethrezen, wishes to possess the heavenly messenger and use its power as his own.

Thus begins the journey of a mysterious messenger from the heavens named Inoel. She becomes a symbol of hope for many inhabitants of Nevendaar. While traveling the world with representatives of three ancient races, Inoel begins to experience emotions previously unknown to her. The game follows her physical and emotional journey to both find the star and explore the world of Nevandaar while also exploring her humanity.

== Expansion ==
The Russian-language version of Disciples III: Resurrection was released featuring the 'Undead Hordes' faction. It is available in either standard, gift pack, or deluxe editions. The English version was released in Europe on October 7, 2011, and in North America on February 7, 2012. Another iteration titled Disciples III: Reincarnation, is an updated version containing both the main game and expansion, featuring a new game engine and added content. The Russian version was released on April 11, 2012, while the English version was released via Steam on February 14, 2014.

== Reception ==
=== Renaissance ===
Reception

Aggregate score
Aggregator	Score
Metacritic	56/100

Review scores
Publication	Score
Eurogamer	7/10
Game Informer	5.5/10
GameRevolution	D
GameSpot	5.5/10
GamesRadar+	2/5
GameZone	7.5/10
IGN	6/10
PC Gamer (UK)	65%
PC Zone	71%

The game received more "mixed" reviews than the first two original Disciples games according to the review aggregation website Metacritic. Game Revolution originally gave it an F, but due to the reports of the game crashing that were proven to be false, the grading has since been raised to a D.

=== Resurrection ===
Reception

Aggregate score
Aggregator	Score
Metacritic	63/100

Review score
Publication	Score
PC Gamer (UK)	65%

The Resurrection expansion pack received "mixed" reviews, albeit a little more positive than the original Disciples III, according to Metacritic.

=== Reincarnation ===
The Reincarnation expansion pack received "average" reviews according to Metacritic.
