= Age of Sail II =

2001 video game

- Developer: Akella
- Publishers: TalonSoft; Global Star Software (P.B.)
- Producer: Chris Lacey
- Platform: Microsoft Windows
- Release: NA: February 1, 2001; EU: February 13, 2001; Privateer's Bounty: EU: August 1, 2002; NA: August 13, 2002
- Genre: Computer wargame
- Modes: Single-player, multiplayer

Age of Sail II (Russian: Век Парусников II) is a 2001 computer wargame developed by Akella. It is the sequel to Age of Sail. It has similar historically accurate game play, and is enhanced with 3D graphics and a free-floating camera. Unlike the original Age of Sail, the sequel's maps are embellished with strategic landmasses. Age of Sail II portrays the fighting ships used from 1775 to 1820, and has a realistic combat engine. The game features a campaign which includes a full career ladder, or play one of the 100+ historical scenarios. The game also includes a map editor allowing players to create custom scenarios.

A stand-alone expansion, titled Age of Sail II: Privateer's Bounty, was released in 2002.

== Gameplay ==
The gameplay of Age of Sail II features a minimap, helm, and lists of vessels in play. The player controls one or more vessels each with a specified number of cannons, health, and sails. There are also controls for speed of the gameplay.

To achieve victory, the player must either cause the enemy ships to surrender, or simply sink them. Damage inflicted on a vessel is determined by the type of shots fired (round, chain, grape, canister), and the target (hull/sail). Each fire also inflicts damage on the ship's crew. Canister shots are made specifically to inflict damage on crew members. The fewer men aboard a ship, the higher chance for the ship to surrender. Speed of activities such as manoeuvring the sails, repairing damage, and cannon reload speed are also affected.

The game was accused by reviewers of the time of having an overcomplicated and sometimes downright broken interface, with unnecessary complication when directing crews to perform the various actions to keep a vessel in operation. The 3-D game engine also came in for criticism, occasionally running as slowly as four frames per second in large fleet actions.

== Reception ==
Age of Sail II

Aggregate score
Aggregator	Score
Metacritic	62/100

Review scores
Publication	Score
AllGame	2.5/5
Computer Games Strategy Plus	2/5
Computer Gaming World	3.5/5
GameSpot	7/10
GameSpy	76%
GameZone	9.5/10
IGN	7.8/10
Jeuxvideo.com	15/20
Next Generation	4/5
PC Gamer (US)	40%

The game received "mixed" reviews according to the review aggregation website Metacritic. John Lee of NextGen, however, said, "Young and old salts will find their timbers shivered mightily in this seagoing extravaganza, but landlubbers may founder."

=== Privateer's Bounty ===
Age of Sail II: Privateer's Bounty

Aggregate score
Aggregator	Score
Metacritic	69/100

Review scores
Publication	Score
Computer Gaming World	2/5
GameSpot	7.7/10
GameSpy	4/5
GameZone	8/10

Privateer's Bounty received average reviews, slightly more favorable than the original Age of Sail II, according to Metacritic.
