= MicroLeague Wrestling =

1987 video game

- Cover art with Hulk Hogan
- Developers: Subway Software; Riedel Software Productions; Up Front Software (Amiga, MS-DOS)
- Publisher: MicroLeague
- Platforms: Amiga, Atari ST, Commodore 64, MS-DOS
- Release: Atari ST, C64: NA: February 1987; EU: 1987; Amiga, MS-DOS: NA: 1989; EU: 1989
- Genres: Turn-based strategy, sports
- Modes: Single-player, multiplayer

MicroLeague Wrestling is a professional wrestling simulation video game developed by Subway Software and Riedel Software Productions and published by MicroLeague. It was released in 1987 for the Commodore 64 and Atari ST, and Amiga and MS-DOS conversions by Up Front Software were released in 1989. MicroLeague Wrestling is the first video game based on the World Wrestling Federation (WWF), and is part of the MicroLeague sports series, which includes MicroLeague Baseball.

In contrast to most action-oriented wrestling games, the gameplay in MicroLeague Wrestling involves turn-based strategy. Players select one of several pre-set matches and choose their wrestler's actions via a menu. Wrestlers are depicted using digitized photographs from actual matches.

== Gameplay ==
Hulk Hogan takes on Randy Savage (Atari ST screenshot)

The game uses turn-based strategy, as players choose a move from their wrestler's arsenal as their opponent does the same, and depending on the situation, one move will be done. Each wrestler has five "basic" moves (which cause two damage points), four "major" moves (which cause four damage points), and one "super" move (which causes six damage points and is the only way to attempt to pin the opponent). Each wrestler also has a block option, which, if done successfully, will remove two of their own damage points. In addition, face wrestlers can attempt a special move in which they rally the crowd to gain momentum and recover some of their damage. Heel wrestlers can attempt special cheating tactics, but this runs the risk of disqualification.

The moves and scenes in the game's matches are accompanied by digitized images of them occurring in each specific match. The original MicroLeague Wrestling disk, released in 1987, features Hulk Hogan vs. Randy Savage on one side and Hulk Hogan vs. Paul Orndorff on the other. In 1988, two expansion discs were released, known as the "WWF Superstar Series". The first of these features Randy Savage vs. The Honky Tonk Man and Jim Duggan vs. Harley Race. The second disk features Hulk Hogan vs. Ted DiBiase and Jake Roberts vs. Rick Rude. The Amiga and DOS versions, released in 1989, feature Hogan vs. Savage (from a later match between them) and Hogan vs. DiBiase. There were no expansions released for this version as the WWF ceased production of the game to focus on console games.

Before the matches, Mean Gene Okerlund interviews the participants. Howard Finkel does ring introductions. During the matches, text commentary is provided by Vince McMahon and either Jesse Ventura or Bruno Sammartino. The expansion disks, as well as the later versions of the game, feature the teams of McMahon and Ventura and Gorilla Monsoon with either Bobby Heenan or Lord Alfred Hayes.

== See also ==
- List of licensed wrestling video games
- List of fighting games
