= Swashbucklers: Blue vs. Grey =

2007 video game

- Developers: TM Studios; Akella
- Publishers: 1C Company; Atari
- Platforms: Microsoft Windows, PlayStation 2
- Release: WW: 2007
- Genre: Role-playing
- Modes: Single-player, multiplayer

Swashbucklers: Blue vs. Grey (Russian: Головорезы: Корсары XIX века) is a 2007 role-playing video game developed by Russian company TM Studios and published by Atari/1C Company for Windows and PlayStation 2.

== Premise ==
The story follows a mercenary named Abraham Gray, who navigate the turbulent period in the American Civil War as he choose between the Union or the Confederates. Each side he aligns with would affect the storyline and the ending.

== Reception ==
Worthplaying felt the box cover art was more exciting than the game itself. Gamezone said the graphics looked three years old. Game Revolution was let down by the game's unimpressive presentation. Gamesradar felt the gameplay was repetitive. IGN felt it was simply not a good game. GameSpot thought it was an inferior copy of Sid Meier's Pirates.

The game has a Metacritic score of 45% based on 16 critic reviews.
