= Red Skies Over Europe =

2004 video game

- Developer: Interactive Vision
- Publisher: Akella
- Platform: Microsoft Windows
- Release: 10 October 2004
- Genres: Action, flight simulator

Red Skies Over Europe is a 2004 action video game developed by Polish studio Interactive Vision and published by Akella. The game is set in the Eastern Front conflict between the Axis powers Luftwaffe and the Soviet Air Force in World War II. The player can fly in aircraft such as the MiG-3, Yak-9, IL-2, Messerschmitt Bf 109, Junkers Ju 87. There are 40 missions in the game.
