= Sabotain: Break the Rules =

2004 video game

- Developer: Avalon Style Entertainment
- Publisher: Akella
- Platform: Microsoft Windows
- Release: WW: 12 November 2004
- Genre: First-person shooter
- Modes: Single-player, multiplayer

Sabotain: Break the Rules (Russian: Саботаж: Кулак Империи, romanized: Sabotazh: Kulak Imperii, lit. 'Sabotage: Fist of the Empire') is a Russian first-person shooter video game developed by Avalon Style Entertainment and published by Akella in November 2004.

It is inspired by films such as The Fifth Element. It was originally a game entitled Sabotain by CDV Software, but the project was later revived by Akella. It entered the alpha stage in July 2002.

== Reception ==
Interia wrote that the only design aspect they liked was the music. Stop deemed it Russia's answer to Deus Ex. XTGamers felt it was weak in terms of graphics and technology. Igray liked the large, diverse world. [Jeuxvideo.com]] described the AI as "shameful".
