= Postal 4: No Regerts =

2022 video game

- Developer: Running with Scissors
- Publisher: Running with Scissors
- Series: Postal
- Engine: Unreal Engine 4
- Platforms: Windows; PlayStation 4; PlayStation 5
- Release: Windows; April 20, 2022; PlayStation 4, PlayStation 5 March 21, 2023
- Genre: First-person shooter
- Mode: Single-player

Postal 4: No Regerts (Note: The word "regrets" is misspelled intentionally.) is a 2022 first-person shooter game developed and published by Running with Scissors. It is the fourth installment in the Postal franchise and was released on October 14, 2019, for Windows through Steam's Early Access program, a decision which was made to acquire public funding for the project and to involve the Postal community in the game's development process. Running with Scissors described the game as the "true sequel" to Postal 2 (2003), contrasting it with the unsuccessful sequel Postal III (2011), which was strongly panned by critics and players.

Postal 4 was released on April 20, 2022 to largely negative reception, with multiple reviewers criticising the game's performance, poor gameplay, and dated humor. The game was released for PlayStation 4 and PlayStation 5 on March 21, 2023.

== Synopsis ==
Set several years after the events of Postal 2's second expansion, Paradise Lost, the Postal Dude and his pitbull terrier, Champ, emigrate to the fictional town of Edensin, Arizona. On the way there, the Dude's car is stolen, forcing him to take on several jobs to make ends meet in the unfamiliar town, with the end goal of getting his car back.

== Gameplay ==
Postal 4 borrows many of its gameplay features from its predecessor, Postal 2. The game is centered around different "errands" that The Postal Dude must complete each day, which include being a prison guard, a sewer worker, and an animal catcher on Monday, a variety of tasks for a gang from "South of the Borderland" on Tuesday, such as border smuggling and turf tagging, working for the mayor of Edensin on Wednesday, including a successor to the petition errand from Postal 2, working for the local mafia on Thursday, with tasks including testing prototypes for video games and rigging an election, and working for the enigmatic kingpin controlling Edensin on Friday, including raiding an ancient temple, dealing with a mercenary militia at the local mall, and plugging a dam before a doomsday cult can use it to contaminate the town's water supply. It also returns the series to a first-person perspective, which was eschewed by Postal III in favor of third-person, though an update later gave players the option to switch to a third-person at any time. Planned gameplay elements include additional weapons, optional "side errands", different outfits for the Dude, and cooperative multiplayer.

Dude was first announced as being voiced by Jon St. John. Later in development, an option was added allowing players to choose between St. John, original Postal voice actor Rick Hunter, Postal III's Corey Cruise, and the film adaptation's Zack Ward.

== Reception ==
Reception

Aggregate score
Aggregator	Score
Metacritic	31/100

Review scores
Publication	Score
GameSpot	1/10
Hardcore Gamer	3/5
IGN	2/10
Shacknews	4/10

According to review aggregator Metacritic, Postal 4: No Regerts received "generally unfavorable reviews", ranking worst out of 824 games rated in 2022. Multiple publications criticised the game's unentertaining gameplay, frequent bugs and performance issues, and poorly executed and dated jokes. GameSpot reviewer Richard Wakeling called it a "genuinely awful experience that should be avoided at all costs".

The story and writing was widely criticised by gaming publications. Travis Northrup of IGN and Wakeling described the game's jokes as poorly written and reliant only on shock value. Northrup stated he felt that unlike media such as South Park and Grand Theft Auto V, the provocative humor was not backed up by intelligent writing, leading to a game that he described as having the "subtlety and nuance of an enraged ape throwing its dung". Conversely, Chris Shive of Hardcore Gamer opined that while the game "plays it too safe" with humor resembling "a parody of what was edgy in 2003", it was ultimately still enjoyable by the series' fanbase.

The gameplay was also heavily criticised by multiple reviewers. Wakeling referred to the game's AI opponents as "dumb and outright broken at times", and its overall gameplay as a "monotonous chore". Northrup called the weapons "terrible to fire", and noted that "there's no reason to think at all during combat" as the player reappears immediately where they left off after dying. Chris Jarrard of Shacknews criticised the behaviour of the game's NPCs, saying that they "just wander around the town with no real purpose or agency". Shive was similarly critical, describing the mechanics as "janky" and "mediocre".

A large portion of reviewers frequently experienced errors and poor performance during gameplay, sometimes impeding their progress. Jarrard stated he "experienced multiple hard crashes" and described the game as a "stutter fest". Northrup stated that he experienced "people phase through the environment and important objectives disappear until I reloaded my save file", and Wakeling called it "riddled with technical issues" to the point of being unable to complete one available ending, with many bugs remaining from the game's early access period.
