= Postal III =

2011 video game

- Developers: Trashmasters; Running with Scissors
- Publisher: Akella
- Writer: Steve Wik
- Series: Postal
- Engine: Source
- Platform: Microsoft Windows
- Release: December 21, 2011
- Genre: Third-person shooter
- Mode: Single-player

Postal III is a 2011 third-person shooter video game developed by Trashmasters and Running with Scissors, and published by Akella. It is the third installment in the Postal franchise and was released for Microsoft Windows. Ports for OS X, Linux, PlayStation 3 and Xbox 360 were announced, but ultimately canceled.

The game follows series protagonist The Postal Dude who, after leaving Paradise in the previous entry's Apocalypse Weekend expansion pack, finds himself in the town of Catharsis, Arizona after running out of gas, and must find a way to escape.

Postal III was a critical and commercial failure and is often cited as one of the worst video games of all time. Following backlash from critics and fans, Running with Scissors declared the game a spin-off and retconned it as non-canonical. Akella entered bankruptcy and ceased operations in 2012.

== Gameplay ==
Postal III features a third-person, over-the-shoulder perspective, unlike Postal and its sequel, which featured a isometric and first-person perspective, respectively. The gameplay is much more linear and mission based, also unlike Postal 2, though an open-world game mode was later added in an update. The player, taking the role of The Postal Dude, uses various firearms and melee weapons to defeat enemies, with the option to attack them either lethally or non-lethally. The player is also able to use cats they find throughout the environment of the game as silencers for their weapons, players can also combine cats with hand grenades and load them into their rocket launcher.

The game features a karma system. The player can either use lethal forces on enemies, and obtain negative Karma, or non-lethal force and obtain good karma. The karma meter is displayed as an icon on the player's HUD, during the first five missions this icon is disabled. The karma system allows for different paths through the game's story, if the player uses excessive violence then the "good" path is unavailable for them.

Postal III continues the trend set by Postal 2 allowing the player to urinate as a non-lethal attack against enemies, this can also be used to extinguish the player if they are on fire. Other non-lethal weapons the player has access to include a taser and pepper spray.

== Plot ==
Postal III includes performances by a wide array of minor celebrities, including Ron Jeremy, Jennifer Walcott, and Randy Jones. The game also contains characters depicting Uwe Boll (director of the 2007 Postal film), Sergei Mavrodi, Osama bin Laden and Hugo Chávez.

In Postal III, the Postal Dude emigrates to Paradise, Arizona's sister town of Catharsis after he destroyed Paradise with a nuclear bomb. Due to the 2008 financial crisis, the Dude drives into town and becomes stranded because he can not afford a tank of gas. He must then find work and do various odd jobs to escape the town.

Through the course of the game, the player can choose one of two paths: the "bad path", which includes joining in on the schemes of Mayor Chomo and Uncle Dave, or the "good path", which involves the Dude joining the Catharsis Police force. The game plays out in a fairly linear and cinematic way, although the player's actions affect the outcome of the story and the game. Although the "good path" is more difficult to play, it offers more storyline and a longer campaign.

There are three endings to the game as Postal Dude must escape from the impending Venezuelan invasion with Hugo Chávez leading the charge.

- Evil Ending: Escaping Catharsis by the skin of his teeth and leaving Chomo, Dave, and Bin Laden at the mercy of hockey moms, Postal Dude winds up at the mercy of the law enforcement, who are quick to give him and his dog the death penalty for his slaughter. His appeal to heaven completely fails and the Postal Dude is sent to hell.
- Neutral Ending: Postal Dude succeeds in escaping Catharsis without resorting to murder or delivering swift justice and meets Jennifer "Jen" Walcott who tries to hijack his car but winds up marrying him instead and enjoying a honeymoon in Peru. He wins the lottery and has a bestselling book that details his personal view of the exploits in Postal 2. During a talk show interview, Champ bites on the groin of the talk show host.
- Good Ending: Saving the world from Hugo Chávez, Postal Dude becomes one of the most popular yet controversial heroes of American history. He winds up becoming the President of the United States with Jen Walcott as his wife and head of the Secret Service who winds up annoying both sides of the political spectrum. As he moves into the White House, a certain nuclear button sparks his inner psychopath.

Regardless of the endings, the Postal Dude's final words are "I regret nothing!"

In Postal 2: Paradise Lost, a 2015 expansion for Postal 2 developed by Running with Scissors, the events of Postal III were retconned as being part of a dream sequence the Postal Dude had; he accidentally crashed his car into a stop sign and entered an 11-year coma from the trauma. Corey Cruise reprises his role in the expansion, voicing an Alternate Postal Dude alongside original voice actor Rick Hunter.

== Development ==
In 2006, Running with Scissors was struggling financially and contracted Akella, who had published Postal 2 in Russia, to create the next entry in the Postal series. Running with Scissors provided the initial design for the game, but was not very involved in development. Shortly after the beginning of development, the 2008–2009 Great Recession in Russia disrupted the game's development and put additional financial strain on Akella. During and after development, Akella refused to provide Running with Scissors access to the game's "source code, assets or developers tools." Because of this, Running With Scissors was not able to provide any updates or patches for the game, and players were not able to create mods for it either. In 2012, shortly after the game's release, Akella ceased operations after being on the verge of bankruptcy.

== Release ==
The game was set to be released through the digital distribution platform Steam on December 20, 2011. However, the main release was delayed; some users were able to obtain the game through the GameFly storefront. The game formally released on December 21, 2011. The game was removed from sale on Steam on November 21, 2022, due to DRM issues. On October 13, 2023, Running with Scissors announced that the game had returned to Steam with the DRM removed.

== Reception ==
Reception

Aggregate score
Aggregator	Score
Metacritic	24/100

Review scores
Publication	Score
Game Informer	1/10
GameSpot	3/10
IGN	5.5/10
PC Gamer (UK)	21/100

Postal III received "generally unfavorable" reviews, according to review aggregator website Metacritic.

GameSpot gave the game 3/10, while Game Informer also lambasted the game, giving it a score of 1/10 and saying that "the people behind Postal III don't have the writing ability to back up their gutter-dwelling mouths. As it turns out, they also don't have the design or programming chops to create a stable game. This makes it one of a handful of games to ever receive such a low score."

In a much more positive review, QJ.Net stated that the game was "one of the most interestingly written, psychotic and harmful games I've ever played" and that the developers had "ended up with a product that looks good, sounds great and is often funny", but also complained that their "experience was marred with constant crashing and a lot of graphical glitches" as well as complaining that it often comes off as "mean spirited and lacking in heart".

Original Gamer also gave a positive review, giving the game a rating of 7.5, deciding that it was "a good game, just not a great one". The reviewer praised its storyline, wide variety of weapons, and creativity while deriding the game's "linear level design and gameplay" and complaining that it takes "a while to get to the meat of the title". It also called out the game's use of good and bad paths, which he believed unfairly favored the good path, deciding that the game "punishes you for being bad, by being bad itself". That said, it concluded by saying that the "fun is there in Postal 3, you just have to work a little for it."

=== Developer reactions ===
In an interview about a month after release, Vince Desi, the head of Running with Scissors, admitted that the "fan reaction has been mixed" to Postal III, as well as stating that most of the complaints centered around the game having "too many bugs." Desi acknowledged that it was hard for him to hear from "diehard fans and hearing their complaints", but did emphasize that the developers have been "making updates to fix a lot of the problems" as well as stating that people who purchased the game at that time would have a "much better experience." He also commented that while Running with Scissors had "designed a very big challenging game with great variety", their development team and publisher "were under tremendous pressure and decided to release a different game, something that they could deliver." He did note that he was "glad that the publisher has tried very hard to make the necessary improvements" following the game's initial reception. He also commented that they were committed to making "sure that gamers get the best value they deserve" from Postal III.

On August 25, 2012, developer and Postal franchise owner Running with Scissors removed Postal III from their store, stating that it was "in the best interest of the Postal Community" and encouraged gamers to instead purchase their earlier titles, stating that they are "a far superior product for a lot less money". This came after revelations that Running with Scissors' relationship with Akella had broken down and that they no longer had any real involvement with the future development of Postal III.

Running with Scissors explained the situation by stating that Postal III "was licensed to a Russian publisher and developer who were supposed to produce the game to our design, with a much bigger team and budget than we had for Postal 2. Even taking those facts into account, it didn't work out very well. It was a mistake and one we will not repeat." They also added that "after the disaster that was Postal III due to the mistake of outsourcing it, we have decided to make the next game 100% in house."

A later interview with Running with Scissors employee Jon Merchant further clarified the situation, stating that "Akella had vastly more resources than we had for Postal 2, so it seemed reasonable at the time they could produce a game that was at least equal to the game we made inhouse. Things started out well but I think they got hit pretty hard by the economic problems of 2007-8, and it all started to go downhill from there. The final product was very far removed from our original design, and horribly broken." He also commented that "the game is a broken mess and should not be sold. We stopped selling the game ourselves some time ago when it became apparent that neither us or the community would get the SDK tools. We don't regard it as the third POSTAL game, just a dodgy spin off that should never have happened."

Vince Desi summarized the situation in a 2013 interview by saying that "some deals work, some don't, PIII failed for many reasons. Worst of all we lost control of the project and that was the beginning of the shitfest. Historically we had a great relationship with Akella, our Russian publisher, and for the record the folks there were good people and I consider them my friends regardless of the fiasco PIII ... Again, it is a testimony to POSTAL fans around the world who have shown their loyal support beyond all odds and hurdles that allows us to keep on going."
