= Postal (video game) =

1997 video game

- Original North American cover art
- Developer: Running with Scissors
- Publishers: NA: Ripcord Games; EU: Take-Two Interactive
- Director: Mike Riedel
- Producer: Vince Desi
- Designer: Steve Wik
- Artist: Randy Briley
- Composer: Christian Salyer
- Series: Postal
- Engine: Unreal Engine 4 (Redux)
- Platforms: Mac OS, Windows: Linux; Mac OS X; Android; Dreamcast; iOS; Redux; Windows; Linux; Nintendo Switch; PlayStation 4
- Release: September 24, 1997: Mac OS, Windows; NA: September 24, 1997; EU: October 1997; Linux; WW: October 29, 2001; Mac OS X; WW: July 26, 2005; Android; WW: April 10, 2015; Dreamcast; NA/EU: June 2, 2022; Redux; Windows; WW: May 20, 2016; Linux; WW: May 29, 2018; Nintendo Switch; WW: October 16, 2020; PlayStation 4; WW: March 7, 2021
- Genre: Shoot 'em up
- Modes: Single-player, multiplayer

Postal is a 1997 isometric shoot 'em up video game developed by Running with Scissors and published by Ripcord Games. The player controls an anonymous gun-toting man (informally dubbed the "Postal Dude") as he commits mass murder in the town of Paradise, Arizona under questionable circumstances. Each level sees players killing a given percentage of police officers, military personnel, and other armed "hostiles" before being allowed to progress, optionally slaughtering unarmed civilians caught in the crossfire.

Running with Scissors (RWS), having previously developed licensed child-friendly games as Riedel Software Productions (RSP), sought to make Postal as outrageous as possible. Inspired by Robotron: 2084 (1982) and the act of "going postal", the game made use of isometric and top-down visual perspectives to distinguish it from the growing first-person shooter market.

Upon its release for Mac OS and Windows in September 1997, Postal received a mixed reception from critics for its short length, unconventional controls, and repetitive gameplay. The game sparked controversy for its violence and gore, and was subsequently banned from several retailers and countries. The United States Postal Service filed a trademark infringement lawsuit against RWS before the game's release, and the case was eventually dismissed in 2003. An add-on to the game titled Special Delivery released in 1998. Postal would gain a cult following and become a franchise, with the direct sequel Postal 2 releasing in 2003. Following its original release, the game received ports to Linux, Mac OS X, Android, and Dreamcast. The source code of Postal was released under the GNU GPL-2.0-only license in 2016, and the game later became freeware in 2019.

A remake of the game, Postal Redux, was released for Windows in May 2016, followed by Linux in 2018, Nintendo Switch in 2020, and PlayStation 4 in 2021.

== Gameplay ==
The player character shooting at hostiles with the shotgun. The top shows the amount of hostiles and total population members remaining in the level, as well as the percentage of hostiles that must be killed.

Postal is a shooter with isometric projection. Movement is always relative to the orientation of the player character (named "The Postal Dude"). The player, therefore, must always be aware of the direction the character is facing, which can be difficult to some players on the isometric maps.

There are eight weapon slots, each with a fixed amount of maximum ammo. The default weapon is a weak machine gun with unlimited ammo. Although it serves no practical purpose, the player can conceal their weapons by pressing the tilde key.

== Plot ==
In the fictional Arizona town of Paradise, an unidentified man (commonly referred to as the "Postal Dude" or "Postal Guy") enters an armed confrontation with fellow residents and law enforcement outside his home. Diary entries provided in the game's instruction manual reveal that the man is a recent evictee, believing himself to be the only individual unaffected by an alleged "sickness" causing violent behavior among the town's population. Theorizing a connection between the illness and the local air force base, he embarks on a lethal journey across Paradise, fighting his way through a ghetto, train station, ostrich farm, and other locales to reach the base. It is implied that the protagonist is being tormented by a demonic presence; the level intermission screens feature text detailing sadistic violence, and a hallucinatory voice (voiced by Rick Hunter) can be heard absurdly taunting victims throughout gameplay.

After raiding the air force base, the protagonist is shown attempting to massacre an elementary school in a non-playable sequence. His weapons have no effect on the children despite his efforts, and he collapses as the school blurs around him. After the elementary school scene, hellish images of bondage and confinement inside an asylum are displayed while an unknown voice gives a report on the protagonist's mental state and motive for his rampage. During the voice's closing remarks, a tortured scream can be heard as the screen rests on a bolted-shut cell door cloaked in darkness.

In the Postal Redux remake of the game, the elementary school sequence is replaced with a new endgame where the player witnesses the burial of an unknown person in a decaying field. Completion of the game on the hardest difficulty features the inclusion of an unknown man and woman mourning over the grave as it descends. Both outcomes prompt a similar collapse of the protagonist and an identical asylum cutscene, now consisting of animated shots over the original release's still images.

== Development ==
By the mid-1990s, Arizona-based work for hire game developer Riedel Software Productions (RSP) had grown creatively exhausted after a decade of producing licensed family-oriented titles for Children's Television Workshop, Hanna-Barbera, The Walt Disney Company, and others. Desiring to create original games the developers would want to play themselves, RSP founders Vince Desi and Mike Riedel established the Running with Scissors (RWS) label to produce mature titles under a different name. RSP was split into three development teams; one worked on a tie-in game for the 1993 film Free Willy, another worked on a product for an academic publisher, and the RWS team of seven people began development of a self-funded shooter game in March 1996. Inspired by the fast-paced shooting gameplay of the Robotron: 2084 (1982) cabinet playable in RSP's office, the game took on an isometric top-down perspective to differentiate it from various first-person shooters such as Doom (1993) and Quake (1996) that RWS felt were oversaturating the PC gaming market. RWS sought to make the game as outrageous as possible, conceiving it as a "murder simulator" featuring purely human enemies rather than aliens or zombies.

An early sketch of the "Postal Dude" by art director Randy Briley, featured in the August 7, 1997 issue of The Wall Street Journal

Early titles considered for the game were The Last Nail and The Postman Always Shoots Twice, a reference to the 1946 film The Postman Always Rings Twice. Aware of the popularity of one-word video game titles such as Doom and Unreal, the team settled on Postal. The title was pitched by designer Steve Wik, who had read a comic book in which a character says "You're going postal!" The team later learned of the term's association with workplace violence committed by disgruntled postal workers in the United States, with Desi stating that "It was like a working title, an in-joke that we realized people were using in the real world. So it stuck."

RWS kept Postal's plot largely vague to focus on delivering immersive gameplay, leaving the details up to player interpretation. Art director Randy Briley gave the game a dark, brooding visual direction, creating hand-painted level backgrounds based on the historical mining town of Bisbee, Arizona. The player character, a gun-toting man designed by Briley, was intentionally given no backstory and obscured in shadows and filters in artwork to allow players to fully impose themselves onto the character. Realizing the character was nameless, Desi coined the "Postal Dude" moniker during an early interview. The protagonist's coat was originally black by default, but RWS discovered during playtesting that he was difficult to track onscreen in the dark levels and among other characters. To compensate, his default coat color was changed to red for the game's initial launch, much to the team's dissatisfaction. The comedic "demon" lines heard throughout gameplay were voiced by Tucson radio personality Rick Hunter.

Postal was developed with RSPiX, a cross-platform game engine developed by RSP and previously used in the company's licensed edutainment games. The game's soundtrack and audio effects were composed by Christian Salyer under his production studio, Sound Element.

== Release ==
Running with Scissors first announced Postal to the public in March 1997. In May of that year, it was announced that Ripcord Games, a new entertainment label of Panasonic Interactive Media, would be publishing the game. A public beta demo of Postal was released online on July 21, and was playable for a month before expiring in August.

The full version of Postal released to retail in North America for Mac OS and Windows on September 24, 1997. A censored European edition of the game was released by Take-Two Interactive in October, removing the ability to execute enemies, the marching band in the "Parade of Disasters" level, and the elementary school post-game sequence. Running with Scissors would release a European-only downloadable patch to restore the censored content. Postal was released in Japan by MicroMouse on January 30, 1998, later receiving an updated edition that re-dubbed all character audio in Japanese and added two exclusive levels, "Tokyo" and "Osaka". Like the European release, this version of the game was censored, removing all blood and once again omitting the elementary school sequence.

In November 1997, Running with Scissors released a free downloadable Christmas-themed patch for Postal, replacing several character appearances and voice lines with those of Santa Claus and his reindeer when installed. An add-on to the game titled Special Delivery released on August 28, 1998, introducing four new levels and additional characters and multiplayer features.

=== Re-releases, ports, and source code ===
Postal Plus, an edition of Postal that bundled both the original game and the Special Delivery add-on as one, released in May 2000. It was re-released in August 2003 as Postal: Classic and Uncut, with the addition of a demo for Postal 2.

A Linux port of Postal was released by Loki Entertainment on October 29, 2001, and a Mac OS X port by Ryan C. Gordon was released on July 26, 2005.

Postal was released digitally on GOG.com in April 2009 and later Steam in March 2013, followed by updates that improved compatibility with modern systems and introduced widescreen and modern controller support. Due to compatibility issues, the multiplayer and level editor features seen in the original release were removed.

In April 2015, an Android port of Postal was rejected from both the Google Play Store and the Amazon Appstore for "gratuitous violence". RWS found the decision hypocritical, citing violent games such as Grand Theft Auto III and Carmageddon that were available on both platforms. Amazon would later reverse its ban, allowing the port to release to the Appstore on April 10. In 2026, Google Play reversed it's ban, not long after the release of an iOS port on the Apple App Store.

In August 2015, RWS announced that it would release the source code of the game "if someone promises to port it to the Dreamcast". In June 2016, RWS gave the source code to a community developer who ported the game to the OpenPandora handheld. On December 28, 2016, the source code was released on Bitbucket under the GNU GPL-2.0-only license. An anniversary update with community-contributed improvements was released in November 2017, restoring legacy game features like multiplayer via LAN and the exclusive content from the Japanese release. The game became freeware on digital platforms in December 2019, and the source code was republished to GitHub in February 2024.

In February 2022, a Dreamcast port of Postal developed by Dan Redfield and licensed by Running with Scissors was announced by independent publisher Wave Game Studios, releasing on June 2, 2022. The source code of the port was also released.

== Reception ==
Reception

Aggregate score
Aggregator	Score
Metacritic	56/100

Review scores
Publication	Score
GameRevolution	B−
GameSpot	6.6/10
Next Generation	4/5
Computer Games Magazine	1.5/5
Games Domain	mixed

NPD Techworld, a firm that tracked sales in the United States, reported 49,036 units sold of Postal by December 2002.

Postal received mixed reviews from critics. It holds a Metacritic score of 56/100. GameSpot's Mark East gave the game a 6.6/10 score and commented: "The lack of longevity in the single-player mode and the simplistic multiplayer options make Postal a moderately fun ride, at best." On regards to The Postal Dude's aggressive personality East comments on the Postal Dude's phrases from his diary, which indicate "something's not quite right in Postal Dude's noggin".

Next Generation reviewed the PC version of the game, rating it four stars out of five, and stated that "Overall, Postal is a title that breaks absolutely no new ground, but its tongue-in-cheek shooting action comes together to form a well-above-average shooter that adds to the genre."

In a retrospective, GamingOnLinux reviewer Hamish Paul Wilson gave the game 7/10, commenting that "there is no denying that Postal has some faults even when compared to some of the other games that were released around the same time as it, and time has definitely not been very kind to the title itself. But the concepts that the game explores, the ideas being expressed, and much of their actual implementations are just so interesting and compelling that one can still actually look past many of these faults and see the hidden gem that lies underneath."

The reviewer from Pyramid #30 (March/April 1998) stated that "Many people have thought the premise for the game is sick. Well, it is. But, that's what makes it fun. There's no quest for secret, lost treasure. There's no time-clock ticking away as you try desperately to save the world. There's no alien spaceships or fantastical powers. There's just good old fashioned, psychotic violence - something that our mass media entertainment powers have been bringing us on prime time for years."

== Legacy ==
=== Sequels ===
A sequel to the game, Postal 2, was released in 2003. Director Uwe Boll bought the movie rights for the series and produced a film of the same name. Two additional sequels, Postal III and Postal 4: No Regerts, were released in 2011 and 2022, respectively.

=== Postal Redux ===
Running with Scissors developed a remake of Postal, titled Postal Redux, using Unreal Engine 4. The project was announced in November 2014, initially targeting a 2015 release for Linux, macOS, and Windows. In addition to these platforms, Running with Scissors announced that Postal Redux was also coming to the PlayStation 4 in February 2016. The Windows version was released on May 20, 2016, while Linux, macOS, and PlayStation 4 versions were scheduled for a later release. The PlayStation 4 version was canceled by June 2017, with Mike Jaret Schachter of Running with Scissors citing a lack of sales of the PC version. A Linux version of the game was released on March 29, 2018. MD Games ported Postal Redux to the Nintendo Switch, releasing it via the Nintendo eShop on October 16, 2020. The PlayStation 4 version was later uncancelled and released on March 5, 2021.
