= Postal (franchise) =

Video game series

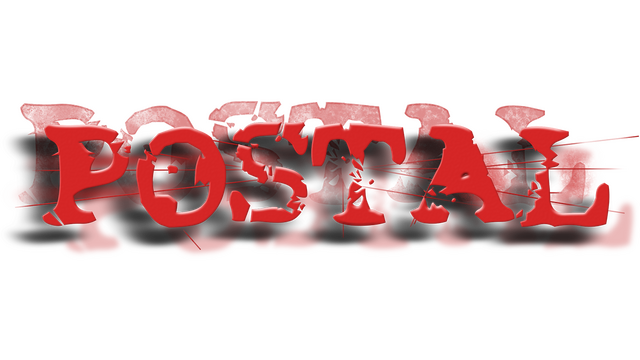
- Developers: Primary; Running with Scissors (1997–present); Trashmasters (2011); Secondary; Avalon Style Entertainment (2005); HeroCraft (2009); Ministry of Fun (2009); Hyperstrange (2020); CreativeForge Games (2020); RWS C Team (2023)
- Publishers: Primary; Ripcord Games (1997); Loki Entertainment (2001); Whiptail Interactive (2003); Akella (2005–2011); Running with Scissors (2012–present); Secondary; HeroCraft (2009); GlobalFun (2009); Hyperstrange (2021)
- Platforms: Microsoft Windows, Linux, macOS, Classic Mac OS, Android, J2ME, Dreamcast, Nintendo Switch, PlayStation 4, PlayStation 5, Xbox One, Xbox Series X/S
- First release: Postal; September 24, 1997
- Latest release: Postal: Brain Damaged; June 9, 2022

Postal is a series of shooter video games created by Running with Scissors known for its high-speed gameplay, violence and off-color humor. The series' mainline games span several shooter sub-genres, including top-down shooters (Postal and Postal Redux), first-person shooters (Postal 2 and Postal 4), and a third-person shooter (Postal III). The series has spawned several spin-off games and other media, including an eponymous film adaptation by Uwe Boll.

== Games ==
Aggregate review scores
Game	Metacritic
Postal	56/100
Postal 2	50/100
Postal III	24/100
Postal 4: No Regerts	31/100
Postal: Brain Damaged	71/100

Year	Title	Platforms	Notes
1997	Postal	Android, Dreamcast, Linux, Mac OS, macOS, Microsoft Windows	
1998	Postal: Special Delivery	Mac OS, Microsoft Windows	An official expansion adding four additional levels and improved Netcode for the multiplayer.
2003	Postal 2	Linux, macOS, Microsoft Windows	The sequel to Postal, firstly introducing a first-person perspective.
2003	Postal 2: Share the Pain	Linux, macOS, Microsoft Windows	An official expansion, which adds PvP multiplayer and two new areas to the single player.
2004	Postal 2: Apocalypse Weekend	Linux, macOS, Microsoft Windows	An official expansion continuing after ending of the base game.
2011	Postal III	Microsoft Windows	The sequel to Postal 2, developed by Russian developer Trashmasters in cooperation with Running with Scissors and published by Akella, which introduced a third-person perspective. Upon release, the game was panned by critics and fans of the series, which resulted in Running with Scissors publicly apologizing for the release and mishandling of development.
2015	Postal 2: Paradise Lost	Linux, macOS, Microsoft Windows	An official piece of DLC for the Steam version of Postal 2. It tells of the Postal Dude's adventures after Apocalypse Weekend, and retcons Postal III, referring to it as a "horrible vision of a future gone wrong."
2016	Postal Redux	Linux, Microsoft Windows, Nintendo Switch, PlayStation 4	A remake of the original Postal, featuring renewed textures and multiple changes made to adapt it to modern games.
2022	Postal 4: No Regerts	Microsoft, Windows, PlayStation 4, PlayStation 5	Described by Running with Scissors as the "true sequel" to Postal 2. The game was announced and released on October 14, 2019, as an early access game and left early access on April 20, 2022.
TBA	Postal 2 Redux	Microsoft, Windows, PlayStation 4, PlayStation 5, Xbox One, Xbox Series X/S, Nintendo Switch	An upcoming remake of Postal 2

=== Spin-offs ===
Year	Title	Platforms	Notes
2005	Postal 2: Corkscrew Rules!	Microsoft Windows	An official spin-off and expansion to Postal 2, developed by Avalon Style Entertainment and published by Akella. The plot concerns a man named Corkscrew, who wakes up in an asylum to find that his penis has somehow been amputated and goes on a mission to find it.
2009	Postal Babes	Android, J2ME	A mobile video game spin-off developed and published by HeroCraft. It tells the story of two "Postal Babes" who must rescue hostages from their local university which has been taken over.
2009	Postal Mobile	Android, J2ME	A mobile video game developed by Ministry of Fun and published by GlobalFun. It tells the story of the Postal Dude who has to fight his way through a town filled with corrupt police officers and street thugs in order to retrieve his stolen car.
2022	Postal: Brain Damaged	Microsoft Windows, PlayStation 4, PlayStation 5, Nintendo Switch	An official spin-off of the Postal series, developed by Hyperstrange and CreativeForge Games and published by Hyperstrange and Running with Scissors. The game is a retro-styled first-person boomer shooter. A demo was released in October 2021, the game was released on June 9, 2022.
2023	POOSTALL Royale	Microsoft Windows	An official spin-off of the Postal series, developed by the RWS C Team and published by Running with Scissors. The game was released on April 1, 2023, as an April Fools' Joke.

=== Cancelled ===
Year	Title	Platforms	Notes
2025	Postal: Bullet Paradise	Windows, Switch, PlayStation	A cancelled bullet heaven game to be developed by Goonswarm Games. Announced on December 3 for a late 2026 release, it was cancelled two days later after a fan backlash accused the developers of using generative AI without disclosing it, which the developer denied before announcing their closure.

== Film ==
A film adaptation of the Postal series was directed and co-written by Uwe Boll. Though the film shares the title of the first Postal video game, it is more heavily drawn from the sequel, Postal 2. New characters are introduced in the film, such as Faith (Jackie Tohn), a young barista who joins the Postal Dude in his adventure, and former U.S. president George W. Bush (Brent Mendenhall).

== Books ==
Two books were published only in Russia. In 2011 published book Postal. Реальный Чувак (Real Dude), which was written by Andrei Shlyachov and published by AST. In 2012 published book Postal. Чувак и надувная свобода (Dude and inflatable freedom), which was written by Igor Gradov and published by AST.

A book based on the first Postal game in the series, named after the game's expansion pack, Postal: Special Delivery, was written by Alisa Bogodarova and published on October 29, 2015, by Publish Green in the form of an Amazon Kindle eBook. The book retells the game's story and the various events leading up to it and introduces several new characters including the Postal Dude's high school friends and teachers as well as original fantasy characters.

On April 15, 2020, a documentary book about the franchise was published – Postal – written by Brock Wilbur and Nathan Rabin, which included an interview with Vince Desi and Mike Jaret.

== Documentary film ==
Going Postal: The Legacy Foretold was released at the Santa Fe Film Festival on February 19, 2025 and digitally on May 30.

== See also ==
- Hatred (video game)
- Violence and video games
