= Planet Muscle =

American bodybuilding and fitness magazine

Planet Muscle was an American bodybuilding and fitness magazine, established by Jeff Everson in 2002. It also had a German website. It was ranked as among the top bodybuilding magazines and was published six times a year. It was formerly published on a quarterly basis.

Planet Muscle folded in 2014.
