= Paradise, Arizona =

Ghost town in Cochise County, Arizona

- Ghost town
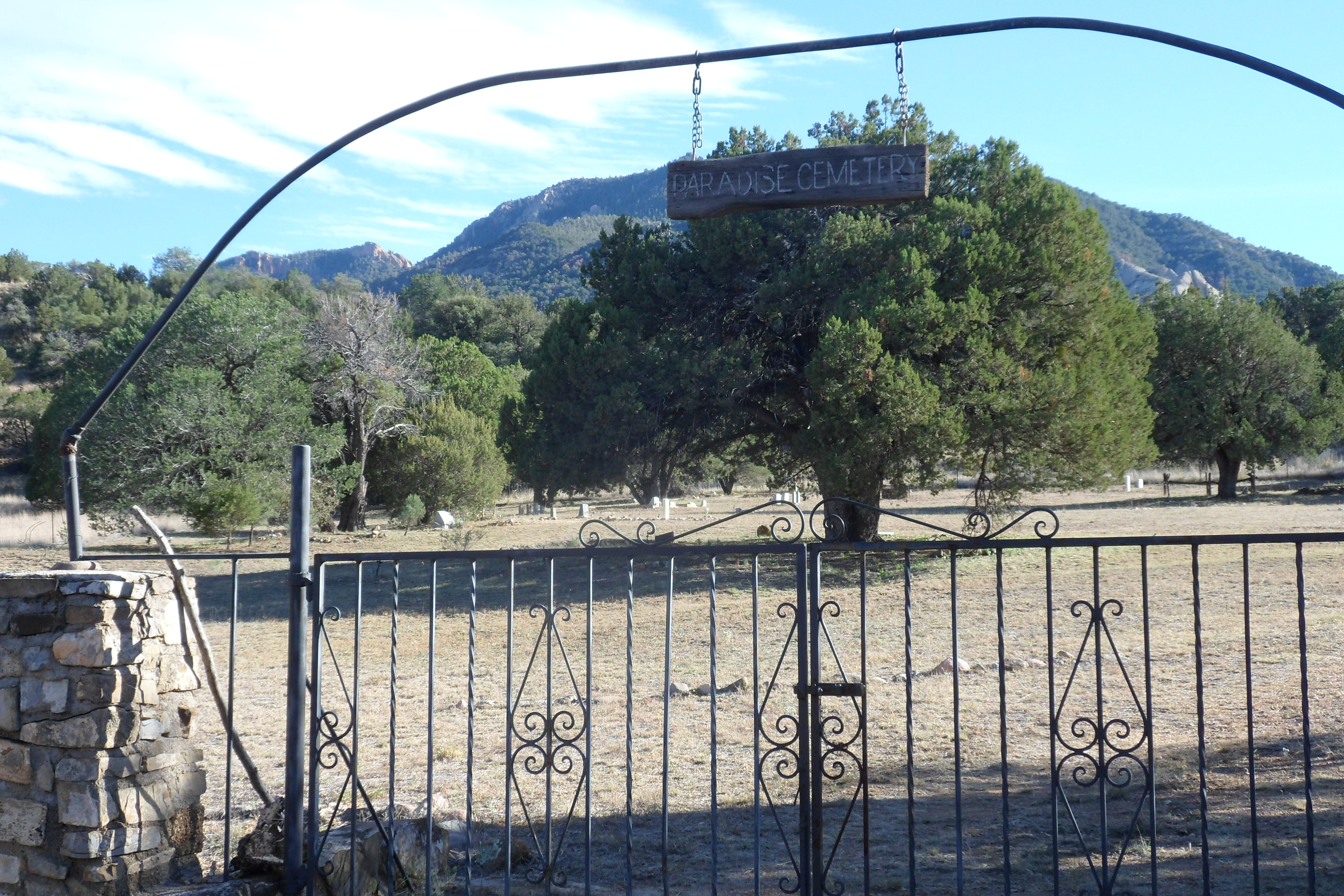
- Paradise Cemetery

- Location within Arizona Location within the United States
- Coordinates: 31°56′5″N 109°13′8″W
- Country: United States
- State: Arizona
- County: Cochise
- Founded: 1901
- Abandoned: 1943
- Elevation: 5,482 ft (1,671 m)

Population (2011)
  - Total: 5
- Time zone: UTC-7 (MST (no DST))
- Post Office opened: October 23, 1901
- Post Office closed: September 30, 1943
- GNIS feature ID: 9192

Paradise is a small ghost town located in Cochise County in the U.S. state of Arizona. The town was settled in 1901 in what was then the Arizona Territory. Paradise is also the setting for the first two Postal games.

== History ==
Old Paradise photo

In 1901 the Chiricahua Development Company located a vein of ore here. A post office was established on October 23, 1901, and at its peak, the town had saloons, general stores, a jail and a hotel. The town was essentially abandoned when the local mines failed, and the post office closed on September 30, 1943. However, a few residents remained. In June 2011, there were five permanent residents and 29 standing structures when the Horseshoe 2 Fire swept through the area. A few homes and cemetery remain.

== Geography ==
Paradise is located 5.7 miles west (up-mountain) from Portal, Arizona, and is surrounded by Coronado National Forest land.

=== Climate ===
According to the Köppen Climate Classification system, Paradise has a hot-summer mediterranean climate, abbreviated "Csa" on climate maps. The hottest temperature recorded in Paradise was 104 °F (40.0 °C) on July 8, 1912, while the coldest temperature recorded was −2 °F (−18.9 °C) on February 3, 2011.

Climate data for Paradise, Arizona, 1991–2020 normals, extremes 1906–present
Month	Jan	Feb	Mar	Apr	May	Jun	Jul	Aug	Sep	Oct	Nov	Dec	Year
Record high °F (°C)	75 (24)	81 (27)	88 (31)	89 (32)	96 (36)	103 (39)	104 (40)	101 (38)	96 (36)	95 (35)	89 (32)	78 (26)	104 (40)
Mean daily maximum °F (°C)	54.4 (12.4)	58.5 (14.7)	64.8 (18.2)	72.5 (22.5)	81.0 (27.2)	89.7 (32.1)	87.5 (30.8)	83.7 (28.7)	79.7 (26.5)	74.3 (23.5)	63.2 (17.3)	54.2 (12.3)	72.0 (22.2)
Daily mean °F (°C)	39.3 (4.1)	43.4 (6.3)	49.1 (9.5)	55.7 (13.2)	63.3 (17.4)	72.3 (22.4)	74.1 (23.4)	70.9 (21.6)	66.2 (19.0)	58.1 (14.5)	47.5 (8.6)	39.9 (4.4)	56.7 (13.7)
Mean daily minimum °F (°C)	24.3 (−4.3)	28.3 (−2.1)	33.4 (0.8)	38.9 (3.8)	45.6 (7.6)	54.9 (12.7)	60.8 (16.0)	58.2 (14.6)	52.6 (11.4)	42.0 (5.6)	31.9 (−0.1)	25.7 (−3.5)	41.4 (5.2)
Record low °F (°C)	1 (−17)	−2 (−19)	8 (−13)	16 (−9)	25 (−4)	37 (3)	39 (4)	44 (7)	27 (−3)	18 (−8)	4 (−16)	2 (−17)	−2 (−19)
Average precipitation inches (mm)	1.14 (29)	1.28 (33)	0.89 (23)	0.33 (8.4)	0.31 (7.9)	0.61 (15)	3.58 (91)	3.41 (87)	1.80 (46)	1.01 (26)	1.07 (27)	1.53 (39)	16.96 (432.3)
Source 1: NOAA
Source 2: National Weather Service

== See also ==
- American Old West
- History of Arizona
- List of ghost towns in Arizona
