= Tanita: Plasticine Dream =

2006 video game

- Developer: Trickster Games
- Publisher: Akella
- Platform: Microsoft Windows
- Release: WW: 2006
- Genre: Adventure game
- Mode: Single-player

Tanita: Plasticine Dream (Russian: Танита Морское Приключение) is a 2006 Russian adventure game developed by Trickster Games and published by Akella.

The game's soundscape is Colombian folk music.

The game's plot sees the young girl protagonist Tanita land on an island after a plane crash, and her journey to safety.

Sector criticized the high difficulty while noting it had an element of nostalgia. Stop liked the sweet graphics. AdventureGamers thought it would appeal to fans of The Neverhood.
