= Zack Ward =

Canadian actor (1970)

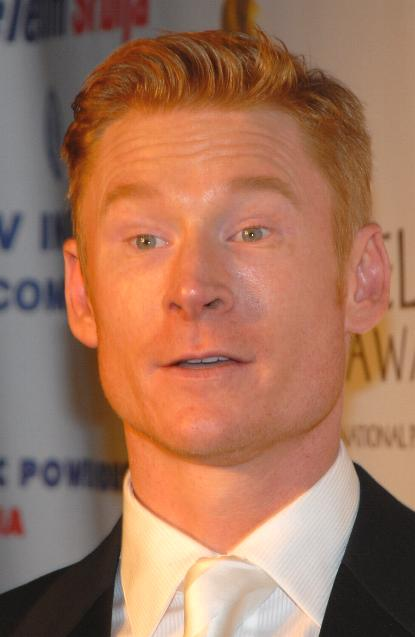
- Ward at the 12th Satellite Awards, December 2007
- Born: Zacharias Ward; Toronto, Ontario, Canada
- Occupation: Actor
- Years active: 1983–present
- Spouse: Jennifer McMahan (m. 2018)
- Mother: Pam Hyatt

Zacharias Ward is a Canadian actor. He made his film debut with a supporting role as Scut Farkus in the comedy film A Christmas Story (1983). Throughout the 1980s and 1990s, Ward appeared in multiple television films, and had supporting roles in the films Ed (1996) and Wild America (1997).

Ward experienced a career resurgence with his main role as Dave Scoville on the Fox sitcom Titus (2000–2002). Following renewed attention, he had supporting roles in the films Almost Famous (2000), Freddy vs. Jason (2003), and Resident Evil: Apocalypse (2004). During the late 2000s, Ward had the lead role of The Postal Dude in the action comedy film Postal (2007), and also being in the video games series in Postal 2: Paradise Lost (2015) and Postal 4: No Regerts (2022), as well as a supporting role in the science fiction film Transformers (2007).

In the 2010s, Ward starred in the films Dark House (2014) and Beyond the Law (2019). He had recurring roles as Roger on the seventh season of the FX horror anthology series American Horror Story (2017) and Lt. Dante on the Syfy series Z Nation (2018). In the 2020s, Ward reprised his Christmas Story role as Scut Farkus in the film's sequel, A Christmas Story Christmas (2022).

== Early life ==
Ward was born on August 31, 1970 in Toronto, Ontario, the son of actress Pam Hyatt and Todd Allen Ward.

== Career ==
He is best known for his character Dave Scoville (Titus's stoner half-brother) on the FOX show Titus and as the bully Scut Farkus in the 1983 Christmas classic A Christmas Story. He has had guest roles on popular television series such as NCIS, Lost, and Crossing Jordan, and roles in films such as Almost Famous, Transformers, and Anne of Green Gables. He has appeared in the horror films Resident Evil: Apocalypse and Freddy vs. Jason. Ward also has had leading roles in BloodRayne 2: Deliverance and Postal, and can be seen in Alone in the Dark II and The Devil's Tomb.

In 2014, Ward co-founded the film production company Grit Film Works with James Cullen Bressack. The first two films which he co-produced with Grit Film Works were the thriller Bethany and the horror film Restoration. The film's score was composed by Christopher Baker and Alex Csillag.

Ward is the CEO of Global Sports Financial Exchange, Inc since 2017.

In 2022, Ward reprised his role as Scut Farkus in the A Christmas Story sequel, A Christmas Story Christmas for Warner Bros. Pictures and HBO Max. He has also endorsed popcorn in an outfit reflecting the character.

In 2024, Ward made his directorial debut on the film The Keepers of the 5 Kingdoms starring James Hong.

== Personal life ==
On August 18, 2018, Ward married actress and producer Jennifer McMahan.

His father was diagnosed with stage 4 Alzheimer's disease in July 2020. He passed away more than three years after being diagnosed on December 19, 2023. In a February 2025 interview about sharing his experiences with his father and his battle with Alzheimer's disease, Ward stated that he stopped drinking in 2021 and smoking in 2023 and instead took the time to try and focus on exercise and a balanced diet. He has since engaged actively in advocacy efforts, most notably speaking at fundraisers and awareness events to promote family connections amid battling the disease.

=== Litigation ===
In August 2011, Ward sued Warner Bros. over merchandising for A Christmas Story after Warner Bros. authorized a figurine set including the Scut Farkus character from the film without Ward's permission. It was revealed that Ward's contract was under ACTRA, unlike the other actors' contracts, and did not grant likeness rights for merchandising. Warner Bros. argued that the figurine showed a "generic face" that has been used on them since 2006 and that statute of limitations had run out, among other claims. The lawsuit was dismissed in January 2012 by mutual agreement.

In December 2012, Ward sued the National Entertainment Collectibles Association, and briefly Warner Bros. again, over his image after attending the annual Christmas Story charity fundraiser convention in Cleveland in November 2010 where a fan handed him a Christmas Story board game, playing cards, and calendar showing his face. The lawsuit was settled three days later.

== Filmography ==
=== Film ===
| Year | Title | Role | Notes |
|---|---|---|---|
| 1983 | A Christmas Story | Scut Farkus | Film debut |
| 1985 | Anne of Green Gables | Moody | |
| 1993 | Just for Fun | Tom | Short film |
| 1994 | The Club | Kyle | |
| 1996 | Star Hunter | Cooper | Video |
| 1996 | Ed | Dusty Richards | |
| 1997 | Lancelot: Guardian of Time | A.J. | |
| 1997 | Wild America | D.C. | |
| 1998 | How to Make the Cruelest Month | Manhattan's Neighbor | |
| 1999 | The Fair | Jimmy | |
| 2000 | Civility | Billy | |
| 2000 | Almost Famous | The Legendary Red Dog | |
| 2000 | The Size of Watermelons | Skinhead | |
| 2001 | Completely Totally Utterly | Chad | |
| 2003 | The Pink House | Murray | |
| 2003 | Freddy vs. Jason | Bobby Davis | |
| 2003 | April's Shower | August | |
| 2004 | A Night at Sophie's | Tony | |
| 2004 | L.A. Twister | Lenny | |
| 2004 | Resident Evil: Apocalypse | Nicholai Ginovaeff | |
| 2005 | Aurora Borealis | Lindstrom | |
| 2006 | Hollywood Kills | Nate Folds | |
| 2006 | Pennies | Stoner Todd | Short film |
| 2007 | Trade | Alex Green | |
| 2007 | Moving McAllister | Earl | |
| 2007 | Transformers | First Sgt. Donnelly | |
| 2007 | Postal | The Postal Dude | |
| 2007 | BloodRayne 2: Deliverance | Billy the Kid | Video |
| 2008 | Kissing Cousins | Charlie | |
| 2008 | Dead and Gone | The Weatherman | |
| 2008 | Alone in the Dark II | Xavier | Video |
| 2008 | Battle Planet | Jordan Strider | |
| 2009 | The Devil's Tomb | Nickels | Direct-to-Video |
| 2010 | Repo | Red | |
| 2010 | In the Void | Mark | |
| 2011 | End of the Road | Falco / Zack | |
| 2011 | Monster Mutt | Sirus Caldwell | |
| 2011 | In My Pocket | Rob | |
| 2014 | Dark House | Chris McCulluch | |
| 2014 | Don't Blink | Alex | Also producer |
| 2016 | Izzie's Way Home | Thurston (voice) | Animated film |
| 2016 | Bethany | Aaron | Also producer |
| 2016 | The Curse of Sleeping Beauty | Nathan | |
| 2016 | Restoration | Harold | Also director and producer |
| 2016 | A Christmas in Vermont | David Briggs | |
| 2019 | Beyond the Law | Desmond Packard | |
| 2021 | Survive the Game | Jean | |
| 2022 | A Christmas Story Christmas | Officer Scut Farkus | |
| 2024 | Darkness of Man | Alexei | |

=== Television ===
| Year | Title | Role | Notes |
|---|---|---|---|
| 1985 | Anne of Green Gables | Moody Spurgeon | TV movie |
| 1987 | Taking Care of Terrific | Seth Sandruff | TV movie |
| 1987 | Anne of Avonlea | Moody Spurgeon | TV movie |
| 1988 | Friday the 13th: The Series | Greg Mazzey | Episode: "Vanity's Mirror" |
| 1990 | Neon Rider | Digger | Episode: "Vengeance" |
| 1990 | My Secret Identity | Daniel | Episode: "White Lies" |
| 1991 | Maniac Mansion | Tim | Episode: "Ugly Like Me" |
| 1992 | Forever Knight | Topper | Episode: "Dark Knight" |
| 1993 | Spenser: Ceremony | Hummer | TV movie |
| 1994 | Boogies Diner | Kirby | TV series |
| 1994 | Harvest for the Heart | Ross Hansen | TV movie |
| 1995 | Sliders | Security Guard (uncredited) | Episode: "The King Is Back" |
| 1995 | NYPD Blue | Jerry | Episode: "Dirty Laundry" |
| 1996 | Sliders | Gerald Thomas | Episode: "The Dream Masters" |
| 1997 | Party of Five | Ted | Episode: "Significant Others" |
| 1997 | Walker, Texas Ranger | Jerry 'Mad Dog' Sullivan | Episode: "Mr. Justice" |
| 1997 | The Sentinel | Orange Glasses Man | Episode: "Breaking Ground" |
| 1998 | Fast Track | | Episode: "Guys with Guns" |
| 1998 | Blade Squad | Billy Mustard | TV movie |
| 1998 | NYPD Blue | Dan Evers | Episode: "Top Gum" |
| 1998 | Nash Bridges | Paul Pangborn | Episode: "Overdrive" |
| 1998 | JAG | Curtis Dastuge | Episode: "The Martin Baker Fan Club" |
| 1999 | Viper | Crup | Episode: "My Fair Hoodlums" |
| 1999 | The Pretender | Little Joshua / Theodore Reed | Episode: "End Game" |
| 1999 | Profiler | Little Joshua / Theodore Reed | Episode: "Grand Master" |
| 1999 | Atomic Train | Stan Atkins | TV movie |
| 1999 | Y2K | Rick Rothman | TV movie |
| 1999 | Brotherhood of Murder | Charles Higgins | TV movie |
| 2000 | Anne of Green Gables: The Continuing Story | Moody Spurgeon | TV movie |
| 2000–2002 | Titus | Dave Scoville | 54 episodes |
| 2001 | Chasing Destiny | Eric | TV movie |
| 2002 | The Outer Limits | Link | Episode: "The Human Factor" |
| 2002 | She Spies | The Thin Man in Black | Episode: "Poster Girl" |
| 2002 | MDs | Dr. Lewis | Episode: "A La Casa" |
| 2003 | Chasing Alice | | TV movie |
| 2003 | Ghost Dog: A Detective Tail | Howie Tibbadoe | TV movie |
| 2003 | Monte Walsh | Powder Kent | TV movie |
| 2004 | Charmed | Kevin Casey / Sirk | Episode: "Styx Feet Under" |
| 2004 | Significant Others | Zack | Episode: "2.6" |
| 2004 | Deadwood | | Episode: "No Other Sons or Daughters" |
| 2005 | Deadwood | Hotel Desk Clerk | Episode: "Childish Things" |
| 2005 | Crossing Jordan | FBI Agent Blair | Episode: "A Stranger Among Us" |
| 2005 | Lost | Marc Silverman | Episode: "Do No Harm" |
| 2005 | NCIS | Police Officer Billy Krieg | Episode: "Hometown Hero" |
| 2005 | All of Us | Jeff Sizemore | 4 episodes |
| 2006 | Girlfriends | Mike | Episode: "Hustle & Dough" |
| 2007 | CSI: Crime Scene Investigation | Steve Card | Episode: "Lying Down with Dogs" |
| 2008 | Terminator: The Sarah Connor Chronicles | Wells | Episode: "Automatic for the People" |
| 2009 | Cold Case | Ed Dubinski | Episode: "Lotto Fever" |
| 2009–2010 | Dollhouse | Zone | Episodes: "Epitaph One", "Epitaph Two: Return" |
| 2010 | I'm in the Band | Xander | Episode: "Got No Class" |
| 2010 | Warehouse 13 | Leo | Episode: "13.1" |
| 2011 | Accidentally in Love | Scott Dunbar | TV movie |
| 2011 | Breakout Kings | Christian Beaumont | Episode: "Like Father, Like Son" |
| 2011 | Drop Dead Diva | Keith Geary | Episode: "The Wedding" |
| 2011 | The Mentalist | Whit Naylor | Episode: "Blood and Sand" |
| 2011 | Hawaii Five-0 | Billy Murphy | Episode: "Ike Maka" |
| 2012 | CSI: Miami | Clyde Novak | Episode: "Law & Disorder" |
| 2012 | CSI: NY | Keith Milner | Episode: "Misconceptions" |
| 2012 | Chicago Fire | Ted Griffin | Episode: "Christmas, Etc." |
| 2013 | The Exes | Bradley | Episode: "Pretty Women" |
| 2013 | Liv and Maddie | Officer Mike Clarkson | Episode: "Sleep-A-Rooney" |
| 2013 | Mike & Molly | Donny | Episode: "The First and Last Ride-Along" |
| 2014 | Blood Lake: Attack of the Killer Lampreys | Will | TV film |
| 2014 | Fallen Cards | The Drifter | |
| 2016 | It's Always Sunny in Philadelphia | Davy | "A Cricket's Tale" |
| 2017 | American Horror Story: Cult | Roger | 2 episodes |
| 2018 | Z Nation | Lt. Dante | 6 episodes |
| 2025 | Bookie | Lou Smith | 2 episodes |

=== Video games ===
| Year | Title | Role |
|---|---|---|
| 2013 | Army of Two: The Devil's Cartel | Alpha |
| 2014 | Murdered: Soul Suspect | Additional voices |
| 2015 | Rise of the Tomb Raider | Konstantin |
| 2015 | Postal 2: Paradise Lost | Himself |
| 2022 | Postal 4: No Regerts | The Postal Dude |
