= Postal (film) =

2007 film by Uwe Boll

- Theatrical release poster
- Directed by: Uwe Boll
- Written by: Uwe Boll; Bryan C. Knight
- Based on: Postal by Running with Scissors
- Produced by: Uwe Boll; Shawn Williamson; Daniel Clarke
- Starring: Zack Ward; Dave Foley; Chris Coppola; Jackie Tohn; J. K. Simmons; Ralf Moeller; Verne Troyer; Larry Thomas; David Huddleston; Seymour Cassel
- Cinematography: Mathias Neumann
- Edited by: Julian Clarke
- Music by: Jessica de Rooij
- Production companies: Boll KG; Pitchblack Pictures
- Distributed by: Kinostar (Germany); Freestyle Releasing Vivendi Entertainment (United States)
- Release dates: October 18, 2007 (Germany); May 23, 2008 (United States)
- Running time: 100 minutes; 114 minutes (Director's Cut)
- Countries: United States; Canada; Germany
- Language: English
- Budget: $15 million
- Box office: $146,741

Postal is a 2007 action comedy film based on the Postal video game series. Directed and co-written by Uwe Boll, it stars Zack Ward, Dave Foley, Chris Coppola, Jackie Tohn, J. K. Simmons, Verne Troyer, Larry Thomas, David Huddleston and Seymour Cassel.

Postal was released in Germany on October 18, 2007, followed by a release in the United States on May 23, 2008. It received mostly negative reviews and was a box office flop, grossing $146,741 against a $15 million production budget.

== Plot ==
Two of the hijackers of American Airlines Flight 11 debate the number of virgins they get in heaven as a reward for carrying out the September 11 attacks. They call their leader, Osama Bin Laden, to find out, but when they learn heaven is short of virgins they abandon the plan in dismay and change the flight path to the Bahamas. At this moment, however, the passengers storm the cockpit and attempt to retake control; despite the terrorists attempting to explain the change of plan, the plane is inadvertently flown into the South tower of the World Trade Center.

Five years later, in the town of Paradise, Arizona, The Postal Dude is kicked out of his local unemployment office and discovers his wife is cheating on him. Angry and desperate to leave the dead-end town, he decides to team up with his Uncle Dave, a slovenly con artist turned doomsday cult leader who owes the US government over a million dollars in back-taxes. The Dude devises a plan to hijack a shipment of Krotchy Dolls—a rare, sought-after plush toy—so that Uncle Dave can re-sell them online. Unbeknownst to them, Osama bin Laden and his group of Al-Qaeda terrorists have been secretly hiding in Paradise since the 9/11 attacks, and are intent on stealing the same shipment, planning to contaminate the dolls with Avian influenza and distribute them to unsuspecting American children.

When both try to intercept the shipment at Little Germany, a German-themed amusement park, a fight between Postal creator Vince Desi and director and park owner Uwe Boll sparks a shootout between the cult, the terrorists and the police, resulting in the deaths of dozens of innocent children. The Dude and the cult are able to get away with both the shipment and the park's opening day guest, Verne Troyer, pursued by Al-Qaeda, the police and an angry mob. Finding their compound has been overtaken by the terrorists, the Dude, Uncle Dave and his followers sneak into the compound's underground bunker. One of his followers, Richie, reveals he must now fulfill the prophecy foretold in Uncle Dave's fictional Bible: to bring about the extinction of the human race. He throws Verne Troyer into a pit of chimpanzees, shoots and kills Uncle Dave, then imprisons the Dude.

The Dude escapes the compound with a plethora of weapons, deciding to wage a one-man war against al-Qaeda, his uncle's murderer, his cheating wife, the police, and everyone else who wants him dead. He meets a young barista called Faith who joins forces with him; together, they kill all the terrorists, the bloodthirsty townspeople, the remains of the cult, his wife and her multiple lovers. In the midst of the shootout, bin Laden is wounded but calls his friend George W. Bush for help. Bush sends a helicopter to save him and plans for the two to rendezvous.

Having won their war, the Dude, Faith, and the former's dog Champ drive away in a stolen police car. They hear on the radio that Bush has blamed the carnage on China and India, and vows to destroy both with extreme nuclear force. In response, Dude takes out a detonator from his pocket. He calmly says "I regret nothing", and detonates his trailer, killing his wife, Officer John and Officer Greg in the explosion. The United States launch nuclear missiles at China and India, who both retaliate by launching nuclear missiles towards America. While Bush and bin Laden skip through a field together, hand-in-hand, all of the nuclear missiles land and America is engulfed in the blast.

== Cast ==
- Zack Ward as The Postal Dude
- Dave Foley as Uncle Dave
- Chris Coppola as Richard
- Jackie Tohn as Faith
- J. K. Simmons as Candidate Eugene Welles
- Verne Troyer as himself
- Larry Thomas as Osama bin Laden
- David Huddleston as Peter
- Seymour Cassel as Paul
- Ralf Moeller as Officer John Mann
- Chris Spencer as Officer Greg Sharp
- Michael Paré as Panhandler
- Erick Avari as Habib
- Lindsay Hollister as Recorder
- Brent Mendenhall as George W. Bush
- Rick Hoffman as Mr. Cornelius Blither
- Michael Benyaer as Mohammed
- Uwe Boll as himself
- Vince Desiderio as Krotchy / himself
- Carrie Genzel as Gayle, The Reporter
- Mike Dopud as Security Guard #2
- Richard Ian Cox as Coffee Customer
- Julia Sandberg Hansson as Mitzi

== Production ==
According to Uwe Boll, the German fan club for Postal contacted him, offering the possibility of the game being adapted into a film. Intrigued by the game's premise and blatant political incorrectness, Boll contacted Running with Scissors president Vince Desiderio, who sold him the rights under the condition that he would be involved with the script and the production. Supposedly, Desiderio and Postal 2 director Steve Wik pitched a much grittier, darker version of the Postal story, but Boll rejected it, fully intent on turning it into a comedy in order to use the film as a platform for political satire as well as "revenge" against the people who have protested his movies. Boll ended up writing the script with assistant director Bryan C. Knight, who had worked on all of Boll's previous video game adaptations. In an interview for Nathan Rabin's book My Year of Flops, Dave Foley said that Boll did want to make a serious statement about how a cult of heroism had surrounded people who were murdered in the 9/11 attacks, and that he and Boll agreed that being the victim of terrorism makes people victims, not heroes. Foley added that he tried to talk Boll out of including the notorious 9/11 sequence that opens the film where two Al Qaeda hijackers plan to call off their attack when Osama Bin Laden informs them that they will not receive anywhere near 72 virgins for their services, only to have passengers break into the cockpit and accidentally fly the plane into the World Trade Center because the film would have no chance of appearing on many (or any) screens in the U.S.

Postal filmed from September 13 to October 30, 2006, in Cloverdale and Vancouver, British Columbia, Canada. The film is set in Paradise, Arizona, like the games, although in reality it is a ghost town. Foley apparently was interested in doing the film because of Boll's apparent reputation on the Internet.

== Release ==
=== Box office ===
==== Worldwide ====
The 114-minute director's cut of Postal premiered at Montreal's Fantasia Festival on July 21, 2007. The film made its way along several more United States and European film festivals until finally receiving a limited release in Germany on October 18. It opened at #27 in the German box office, taking in $79,353 from 48 screens and banked $142,761 in its entire run. In Italy, it ended its box office run after two weeks with $3,980. As of August 31, 2008, it has grossed a total of $146,741 worldwide.

==== North America ====
Despite Boll's announcement that Postal would be given a wide release on October 12, 2007, it was delayed until May 23, 2008. Additionally, on 16 May, theater distributors pulled out of their deal for a wide release of 1,500 screens to a limited release of only four screens. Said Boll of the change, "Theatrical distributors are boycotting Postal because of its political content. We were prepared to open on 1,500 screens all across America on May 23rd. Any multiplex in the U.S. should have space for us, but they're afraid... We have even tried to buy a few screens in New York City and Los Angeles, and they won't let us even rent the theaters! I urge independent exhibitors to contact us and book 'Postal'! Audiences have been expecting the film and I don't think exhibitors should censor what gets played in U.S. theaters."

On May 20, the screen count increased to 12 screens. By release, it had grown to 21.

Postal opened one day after Indiana Jones and the Kingdom of the Crystal Skull, which led to video promotions from Boll, jokingly claiming that his film would "destroy" the other film at the box office. A number of Internet promos were made featuring Troyer dressed as Indiana Jones, proclaiming Postal's superiority.

=== Home media ===
Postal received its North American DVD release on August 26, 2008, in both 102-minute unrated and 100-minute rated versions, as well as a 102-minute unrated Blu-ray release. Both versions feature the film's trailer, a promotional spot featuring Verne Troyer's Indiana Jones, a featurette detailing the filming of the Little Germany scene, footage of Boll's infamous "Raging Boll" boxing matches and an audio commentary by Boll. Some editions come with the full version of Postal 2 (Share the Pain edition) on a bonus disc.

The 118-minute director's cut was released on September 26, 2008, in Germany. It was planned for a North American release on Blu-ray for November 25, 2008, and on DVD for January 6, 2009, however this did not eventuate for another 16 years. The director's cut is cropped from the original 1.85:1 aspect ratio into 2.35:1.

On March 12, 2024, Postal was re-released as a 4K UHD Blu-ray with a bonus Blu-ray disc. The 4k Blu-ray contains just the theatrical cut, while the Blu-ray contains both the theatrical and director's cuts and extensive special features.

Postal has been released in Australia as an 89-minute cut with no special features, bearing an MA15+ rating.

=== Critical reception ===
On Rotten Tomatoes, the film has an approval rating of 9% based on 46 reviews, with an average score of 3.6/10. The site's critics consensus reads: "An attempt at political satire that lacks any wit or relevance, Postal is nonetheless one of Uwe Boll's more successful films – for what it's worth." Metacritic, which uses a weighted average, assigned the film a score of 22 out of 100, based on 11 critics, indicating "generally unfavorable" reviews.

Jeremy Knox of Film Threat gave the film 3 out of 5 stars and stated, "It's such an insanely fun ride that most of its flaws are forgivable." Peter Hartlaub of the San Francisco Chronicle gave the film 2.5 out of 5 stars and called it "not only less than horrible, but actually occasionally enjoyable." Nathan Rabin of The A.V. Club gave the film 2 out of 5 stars and called it "a provocation first, an insult second, a publicity stunt third, and a film a distant fourth." Dennis Harvey of Variety gave the film 2 out of 5 stars and stated, "This anything-goes exercise isn't dull -- one just wishes the outrageousness were more consistently funny."

Maitland McDonagh of TV Guide gave the film 2 out of 5 stars and stated, "Postal's touches of wit are lost in the flying body parts, gross-out gags, and the full frontal spectacle of Foley's no-longer-private parts." Michael Harris of The Globe and Mail gave the film 1 star out of 5 and stated, "What Boll gives us is a boring beating over the head." Aaron Hillis of The Village Voice gave the film 1 out of 5 stars, saying that it "manages to be as toothless as [Boll] is tasteless. Poorly framed, tone-deaf, and nonsensical (yet still Boll's best!)" Nathan Lee of The New York Times gave the film 0.5 out of 5 stars, calling it "infantile, irreverent and boorish to the max," and stating that it "explodes with bad attitude and lousy filmmaking." Elizabeth Weitzman of the Daily News gave the film 0 out of 5 stars and stated, "Where Boll's movies were once amusingly atrocious, Postal is so aggressively tasteless and knowingly idiotic, there's just no fun to be had."

=== Accolades ===
The film was nominated for three Golden Raspberry Awards: Worst Supporting Actor (Boll as himself), Worst Supporting Actor (Troyer as himself), and Worst Director (Boll). The film ended up winning Worst Director. Postal won two awards at the Hoboken International Film Festival: Best Director and the festival's top prize, Best of Festival.

== Cancelled sequel ==
Boll stated shortly after the film's production that he would most likely make a Postal 2, even if it went direct-to-video. In a 2012 interview, Vince Desi of Running with Scissors commented that they "are in talks at present regarding another movie". On August 28, 2013, Boll announced he was funding production of Postal 2 through Kickstarter. The project was canceled on October 5 due to lack of funding.

== See also ==
- List of films based on video games
- Going Postal: The Legacy Foretold, a documentary about the Postal series
