= Postal 2 =

2003 video game

- Original North American cover art
- Developer: Running with Scissors
- Publisher: Whiptail Interactive
- Producer: Mike Riedel
- Designer: Steve Wik
- Programmer: Mike Riedel
- Artists: Josh Leichliter; Geoff Neale
- Writer: Steve Wik
- Composer: Christian Salyer
- Series: Postal
- Engine: Unreal Engine 2
- Platforms: Windows; Mac OS X; Linux
- Release: Windows; NA: April 14, 2003; EU/JP: April 17, 2003; Mac OS X; WW: December 9, 2004; Linux; WW: February 4, 2005
- Genre: First-person shooter
- Modes: Single-player, multiplayer

Postal 2 is a 2003 first-person shooter video game developed by Running with Scissors and published by Whiptail Interactive. It is the second installment in the Postal franchise, and was released for Microsoft Windows in April 2003, macOS in April 2004 and Linux in April 2005. Postal 2, as well as its predecessor, has received notoriety for its high levels of violence, stereotyping, and black comedy. Unlike the first installment, Postal 2 is played from a first-person perspective, rather than an isometric perspective. The game is the first in the series to feature an open world.

Set in the fictional Arizona town of Paradise, Postal 2 follows the life of "The Postal Dude", who must carry out mundane tasks throughout an in-game week, with the player deciding how violently or passively he will react to various situations. The player navigates the game's map to carry out his errands, with player choice having an effect on the setting.

The game received a mixed reception from critics upon its release and has gained a cult following. It has received several expansion packs, and in December 2003, a multiplayer expansion was released, titled Postal 2: Share the Pain, though the multiplayer servers were shut down in September 2015. Postal 2 remains continually updated, with a new expansion pack titled Paradise Lost released in April 2015.

The game received attention for its violent gameplay, and was responsible for multiple controversies. It was followed by a sequel, Postal III, in December 2011, and another, Postal 4: No Regerts, in April 2022. A virtual reality adaptation, along with a remake of the game, known as Postal 2 VR and Postal 2 Redux respectively have been announced, being developed by Flat2VR Studios and Team Beef, with Redux planned to release in 2027.

== Gameplay ==
Interacting with a resident of Paradise

One of the major concepts of Postal 2 is that it is meant to be a "living world", a simulation of a tongue-in-cheek off-kilter town. Game characters live out their lives completely separate from the actions of Dude—walking around town, buying and selling merchandise, and even engaging in random shootouts with each other and the police.

The town features many cars but they are all "useless exploding props", according to Dude, and cannot be driven, although they can be blown up and sent flying into the air. In addition to cats and dogs, elephants are present; these animals can be shot or set on fire, with the elephants getting annoyed by the player even walking into them—causing them to trumpet with rage and attack anyone within stomping distance. A peculiar feature is the ability to pick up cats as an inventory item. When used, The Postal Dude shoves the barrel of the currently equipped firearm into the cat's rectum (cats can only be used while equipped with a shotgun or assault rifle) as a "silencer". Every time a shot is fired, the cat meows in apparent agony, and the gunshot is muffled. After nine shots, the cat has run out of lives and it will fly from the end of the weapon. Most dogs have the ability to befriend the Dude if he feeds them a continual supply of dog biscuits or feeds them any other food (pizza, donuts, fast food). Once a canine's loyalty has been earned, the dog will attack anyone who attacks the Dude, or alternatively, anyone whom the Dude attacks. Dogs will also chase and kill cats, and play fetch with the Dude's inventory items and severed heads. There were also going to be cows included in the game, but they were not added until the Apocalypse Weekend and the A Week in Paradise modifications.

The game also features a cameo by Gary Coleman, acting as himself, who appears early on as the objective of one of the game's tasks (travel to the local shopping mall to get Gary's autograph). The player can choose to fight and kill Coleman or simply have the book signed peacefully (after enduring a long line-up). The Dude twice mistakes Coleman as having starred in What's Happening!! and The Facts of Life, when he actually starred in Diff'rent Strokes. Regardless of the Dude's actions, the police storm the building in an attempt to arrest Gary Coleman and a gunfight ensues which invariably results in Coleman's apparent demise, with or without the player's help. Later on in the game he can also be seen in the Police Station, when the player escapes from his cell he also frees everyone else—including Coleman, who can be seen running alongside Krotchy. Coleman apparently survives as he can be seen in the Apocalypse Weekend expansion, bandaged up in the hospital (various evil Gary Coleman clones also serve as recurring enemies during Postal Dude's constant hallucinations), as well as leading a group of little people, known as the ColeMen, in Paradise Lost.

== Plot ==
In Postal 2, the player takes on the role of the Postal Dude, a tall and thin red-headed man with a goatee, sunglasses, a black leather trench coat, and a T-shirt with a grey alien's face printed on it. Postal Dude lives in a dilapidated caravan trailer on land behind a house in the small town of Paradise, Arizona, with his wife, who is identified in the credits as "The Bitch". The game's levels are split into days of the week starting Monday and finishing Friday. (Unless the player chooses the "A Week in Paradise" mode in which you play the week starting Monday and ending on Sunday).

At the beginning of each day, Postal Dude is given several tasks to accomplish, such as "get milk", "confess sins", and "pick up laundry", among other seemingly mundane tasks. The objective of Postal 2 is to finish all of the tasks throughout the week, and the player can accomplish these tasks in any way they wish, be it as peacefully and civilly as possible, or as violently and chaotically as possible. It is possible, if occasionally difficult, to complete most tasks without engaging in battle, or at least, harming or killing other characters, as evidenced by the game's tagline: "Remember, it's only as violent as you are!" The daily tasks can be accomplished in any order the player desires, and the game also includes one task that is activated only when Postal Dude urinates, in which the player is tasked with getting treatment for gonorrhea after Postal Dude discovers he has the infection.

Throughout the course of the game, Postal Dude must put up with being provoked by other characters on a regular basis. He is given the finger, mugged, attacked by various groups of protesters, and is harassed by an obnoxious convenience store owner/terrorist and his patrons who cut before Postal Dude in the "money line". During the game, Postal Dude also encounters a marching band, a murderous toy mascot named Krotchy, the Paradise Police Department and its SWAT team, overzealous ATF agents, the National Guard, an eccentric religious cult, cannibalistic butcher shop workers, fanatical al-Qaeda terrorists, and former child actor Gary Coleman, among many others.

Due to The Dude's actions, each day he will add a group he needs to "watch out for", which includes, going chronologically, RWS Protesters, Book Protesters, Rednecks, Butchers, and Parcel Carriers. He gains these after interfering with their work, like The Dude uncovering the butchers' human meat operation, and The Dude escaping the rednecks' base.

By Friday afternoon, the final day in the game, the apocalypse occurs and societal collapse soon follows, with all law and order breaking down. Cats begin to fall out of a darkly-colored sky, and almost everyone in town becomes heavily armed, with random gun battles breaking out in the streets. Despite this, Postal Dude returns home to his trailer as normal, where his wife demands that Postal Dude explain why he never picked up the "rocky road" she asked for at the beginning of the game. Postal 2 then ends with a gunshot being heard, before being kicked to the end credits.

== Development ==
Vince Desi led the development of the game, which started in Summer of 2001. Nine people were employed full-time to work on the game.

== Release ==
Postal 2 was the first release by Whiptail Interactive, a publisher based in West Chester, Pennsylvania. The game was released to manufacturing in early April 2003 and shipped later that month in North America and Europe.

In 2012, Postal 2 is released on Steam after a approved submission on Steam Greenlight along with its expansions.

=== Expansions ===
==== Share the Pain ====
An updated edition of the game, entitled Postal 2: Share the Pain, included a multiplayer mode. The Macintosh and Linux versions of Postal 2 shipped only as Postal 2: Share the Pain.

Share the Pain received an average score of 59 out of 100 based on 10 reviews on review aggregator website Metacritic, indicating "mixed or average reviews".

==== Apocalypse Weekend ====
Postal 2: Apocalypse Weekend is an expansion pack to Postal 2 released by Running with Scissors. As a result of issues with publisher Whiptail Interactive, the expansion pack was originally released in Russia on August 1, 2004. In the USA and other countries the expansion pack was released on May 31, 2005 for Microsoft Windows, and September 28, 2005 for the Mac OS X and Linux versions. Apocalypse Weekend expands the reaches of Paradise with new maps and missions, set on Saturday and Sunday, adds new weapons and foes, and raises the gore and violence to an even greater level. It was later included in both the Postal Fudge Pack and Postal X: 10th Anniversary compilations alongside Share the Pain and several fan produced mods, including A Week in Paradise which allows content from Apocalypse Weekend to appear in the original game as well as allowing the expansions levels to be played as part of the original five-day campaign.

Apocalypse Weekend begins Saturday morning, with the Postal Dude waking up in the hospital, his head bandaged from a near-fatal gunshot wound. While the Postal 2 ending leaves it ambiguous as to whether or not the Dude shot his wife or if his wife shot him, after he wakes up in the hospital he finds a card from his wife saying that she is leaving him. It was later revealed on the official website that the Dude shot himself due to his wife nagging him. The Dude's ultimate goal is to recover his trailer and his dog Champ, and to this end, escapes from the hospital.

With the exception of the zombies that appear later in the game, it would appear the madness depicted at the end of Friday on the previous game has petered out. The Dude proceeds through several missions including assignments from his former employers, Running with Scissors, encounters with mad cow tourette zombies, as well as confrontations with terrorists and the military. Periodically, the Dude's head wound causes him to enter a nether realm where he is attacked by Gary Coleman clones. Throughout the weekend, the Dude fights off hordes of zombies, Taliban and the National Guard until he finally faces a zombified Mike Jaret, an employee of Running with Scissors. Once the Dude destroys it, he leaves Paradise in his car with his dog and his trailer while Paradise explodes due to a massive nuclear warhead he "borrowed" to destroy a rival video game development and publishing company. The Dude's last words of the game are "I regret nothing".

While gameplay is similar to its parent Postal 2, Apocalypse Weekend is not as open-ended. The gameplay is more linear in design, with the player mostly forced to follow a certain path to complete the game—typical of most first-person shooter games. In addition, the player cannot play as a pacifist and is forced to kill animals and zombies in order to progress in the game. Unlike the main game, Apocalypse Weekend also includes several "boss monster" encounters. All normal cats are also replaced with "dervish cats", which spin in a manner similar to that of Looney Tunes' Tasmanian Devil, attacking any nearby character when agitated. Dervish cats can also be collected and, in addition to muffling guns, can be thrown at NPCs to attack them.

Apocalypse Weekend received an average score of 45 out of 100 based on 4 reviews on Metacritic, indicating "generally unfavorable reviews".

==== Corkscrew Rules! ====
Postal 2: Corkscrew Rules! (Russian: Postal 2: Штопор жжот!, romanized: Shtopor zhzhot!) is an official spin-off and expansion to Postal 2, developed by Avalon Style Entertainment, and released in 2005 by Akella. The plot concerns a man called Corkscrew (Russian: Штопор, romanized: Shtopor), who wakes up to find that his penis has somehow been amputated and goes on a mission to find it. The game was released only in Russia and Japan (under the title "ポスタル2 ロシアより愛をこめて" which translates to "From Russia with Love"). In 2017, an English version of the game was made available for free through the Steam Workshop.

==== Paradise Lost ====
Postal 2: Paradise Lost is a downloadable content pack for Postal 2, announced for Steam at E3 2014 with a teaser trailer. It was released on April 14, 2015.

Paradise Lost takes place 11 years after Apocalypse Weekend, the Postal Dude awakens from his 11-year radiation-induced coma, the same amount of time between Postal 2's release and the release of Paradise Lost, only to find his dog Champ is missing and has to go back to his home town of Paradise, which is now a post-apocalyptic wasteland. Paradise Lost also retcons Postal III as it was revealed that the events of that game were just a nightmare that the Postal Dude had during his coma.

Returning to Paradise, Dude allies with factions whom he had encountered in the previous games, including RWS, Al-Qaeda and the Kosher Mad Cow Tourettes Zombies. They attempt to help him find Champ. Near the end of the game, Dude has to go to Hell and battle Champ and his now-ex-wife, who has turned into a demon. Returning to Earth, he finds out that all the factions have gone to war and gives himself a choice: return to each faction and defeat its leader or leave the town. Eventually, he and Champ leave Paradise for the last time.

Paradise Lost includes various characters based on real people, including former child actor Gary Coleman, a returning character from Postal 2 as well as Canadian actor Zack Ward who had previously depicted the Postal Dude in the 2007 Postal film. Former tech journalist and media personality Milo Yiannopoulos also had a less prominent role in the game as an NPC able to be found at the 'Fire in the Hole' club from Thursday onwards. All three of these characters were played by their real life counterparts - Coleman's dialogue was re-purposed from Postal 2 due to his death five years earlier.

=== Compilations ===
On November 13, 2006, RWS Released a compilation of Postal - Classic and Uncut, Postal 2: Share the Pain, Apocalypse Weekend, A Week in Paradise, and Eternal Damnation, along with extra content (Postal Babes and video clips from "their cutting room floor") as the Postal Fudge Pack on a 3-way hybrid DVD for Windows, Linux, and the Mac. Recent copies of the Fudge Pack also include a Steam key for Postal, Postal 2 Complete and Postal III.

The Postal X: 10th Anniversary edition contains all the content from the Postal: Fudge Pack as well as introducing new content such as a cereal box, A Very Postal Christmas, Music to Go Postal By, and previews for both Postal III and the Postal film.

Postal 2 Complete is an online compilation containing Postal 2: Share the Pain and its expansion Apocalypse Weekend which is available from both the Desura platform for Linux, Mac and Windows and from GOG.com for Windows. The Linux version available from Desura was newly updated for its release on the digital distribution platform. The pack was made available through Steam on November 2, 2012, after successfully getting Greenlit by the community.

In November 2017, Running with Scissors released Postal XX: 20th Anniversary, a compilation of all Postal titles and the Postal film.

In March 2024, the Fudge Pack was reissued as a Blu-ray data disc, containing all Postal titles released up to that point, the Postal film and several bonuses.

=== Mods ===
The game shipped with a level editor based on UnrealEd called POSTed, which allows for the creation of new levels, scenarios and cutscenes. Later releases of the game also come with support for submitting custom content to the Steam Workshop.

== Controversies ==
Urinating on dismembered bodies in a terrorist training camp. This scene caused a great deal of controversy in New Zealand as graphic depictions of urination are deemed obscene in New Zealand, even though the game has no scripted scene of this; this is a purely optional act for the player.

In 2004, the Office of Film and Literature Classification banned Postal 2 in New Zealand, citing high levels of violent content and animal violence. Distribution or purchase for personal use is a criminal offense, punishable by up to 10 years in prison and a fine of $50,000. In Australia, the game was banned by the Australian Classification Board in October 2005, but the ban was quietly lifted in October 2013. In Sweden, the Chancellor of Justice took the local distributor of the game to court. He was prosecuted with "illegal depiction of violence", a crime falling under the Swedish freedom-of-speech act. The court dismissed the case on December 12, 2006. In May 2016, the game was removed from the German version of Steam because it is on the list of media harmful to young people which means that it may only be offered and sold to adults after age verification (Steam does not offer age verification that is valid under German law).

Regarding his views on the subject, Linux and Macintosh developer Ryan C. Gordon, who ported the game to those platforms, stated that he feels that the game holds a mirror to the worst aspects of modern society, saying in an interview that the game is a "brilliant caricature of our mangled, disconnected, fast-food society, disguised as a collection of dirty jokes and ultraviolence." Michael Simms, founder of Linux Game Publishing, also at one point commented on the matter, stating that "although I wasn't a fan of the gameplay in Postal 2, I loved the message that the company was trying to put out. Because you can play Postal 2 in the most violent and graphic way, but you can also play it without hurting a single person. I don't know anyone who's played it like that, but I like that the people who made Postal are saying you can get through this game without any violence."

In January 2008, three nineteen-year-olds were arrested following a three-week-long arson and theft spree in Gaston County, North Carolina. Police claimed that the spree was inspired by actions that could be carried out in Postal 2.

== Reception ==
Reception

Aggregate score
Aggregator	Score
Metacritic	50/100

Review scores
Publication	Score
Eurogamer	3/10
Game Informer	7.5/10
GameSpot	4.8/10
IGN	5.5/10
PC Gamer (US)	79/100

Postal 2 received "mixed or average reviews" according to review aggregator website Metacritic. Some of the game's better reviews came from PC Gamer and Game Informer. On the other end of the spectrum, GMR and Computer Gaming World (CGW) both gave Postal 2 scores of zero, with CGW deriding Postal 2 as "the worst product ever foisted upon consumers." In response, negative quotes from Computer Gaming World's review ended up being proudly displayed on the box art of the Postal Fudge Pack. CNN journalist Marc Saltzman wrote that the game was "more offensive than fun" and concluded that "it simply goes too far, too often, and offers little else."

GameSpot criticized the game's loading times, graphics and gameplay, and the gore was called "surprisingly subdued" in comparison to contemporary games like Soldier of Fortune II: Double Helix. In a middling review for IGN, author Ivan Sulic disliked the game's crude and childish humour, and dismissed the setting of Paradise as "bland". Eurogamer similarly attacked the game for being immature. Ivan Deez from IGN says that Postal Dude has a "sick mind", when referring to the source of some of the errands he has to complete. Macdonald and Rocha from Canada.com describe Postal Dude as a man whose "raison d'être was to eliminate anyone - man, woman and child - with a dizzying arsenal of weapons", but at the same time as "a misunderstood and ostracized man who takes his revenge on the world with a killing spree."

=== Sales ===
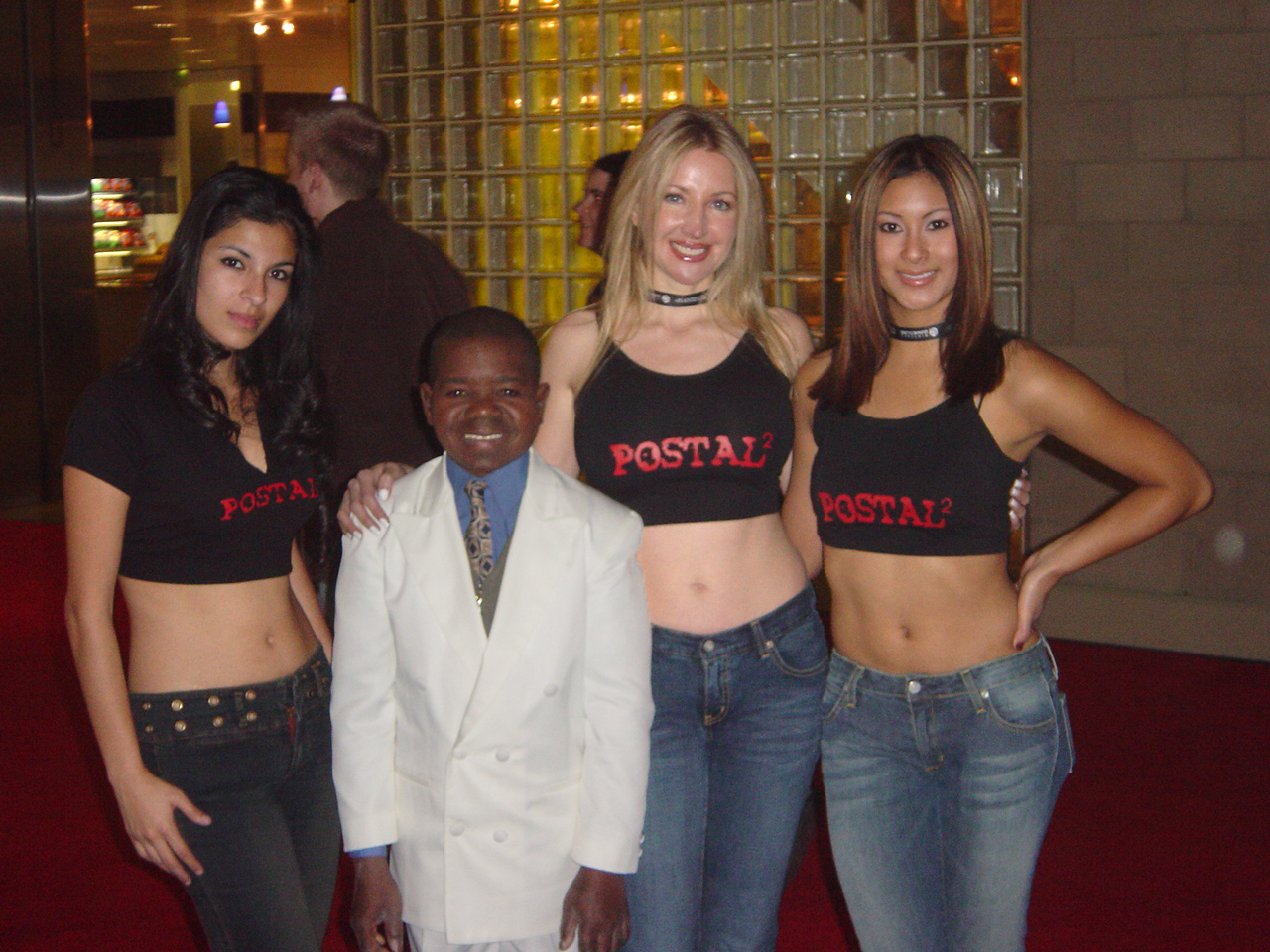
Promotion of Postal 2 at E3 2003, featuring Gary Coleman, who appears in the game as a character

Postal 2 became Linux Game Publishing's fastest selling game in its first month, and contributed greatly to the continuing profitability of the company.

== In other media ==
Scenes of the game can be seen in the music video of the Black Eyed Peas single "Where Is the Love?" where children were shown playing the game. Running with Scissors stated in 2021 that they were paid for the use of the game's footage.

== Film adaptation ==
Although acknowledged as an adaptation of the first Postal game, the 2007 film adaptation of the same title directed by Uwe Boll borrows many elements from Postal 2, including the Krotchy doll, the trailer park, the cat silencer, The Lucky Ganesh convenience store, the terrorists, and Uncle Dave and his compound, among others. Gary Coleman was not involved in this film; instead Verne Troyer, appearing as himself, fulfilled Coleman's function in the movie.

In 2013, Boll announced the second Postal film. In August 2013, Boll announced he was funding production of Postal 2 through Kickstarter, but the project was cancelled in October 2013.
