= Akella =

Defunct Russian software company

- Industry: Video games
- Founded: 1993; 33 years ago
- Defunct: 2012
- Fate: Bankruptcy, Liquidated
- Headquarters: Moscow, Russia
- Number of employees: 250 (2012)
- Divisions: Akella Online
- Website: akella.com

Akella (Russian: Акелла) was a Russian software company specialising in the development, publishing and distribution of video games and multimedia products. The founders met in 1993 and decided to start a company together and in 1995 formed Akella. The company comprised five in-house development teams, a publishing house, a distribution center, a localisation team and a quality assurance department; in total, 250 people were employed by Akella. There were several sub-brands owned by Akella, such as Macho Studios, that developed erotic games and published Japanese hentai dating sims.

The company is named after a Rudyard Kipling's Jungle Book character, Akela the wolf, and its logo is a wolf.

== Defunct status ==
During 2012, the company was amid multiple lawsuits totalling ₽200,000,000 (roughly $6,000,000) which, combined with the significant developmental difficulties and commercial failings of Postal III, pushed Akella to the verge of bankruptcy. As a result, the company, while technically still existing, has effectively ceased operations since 2012.

== Games developed and published ==
Year	Title	Platform(s)	Developer(s)	Publisher(s)
1997	Postal	Windows	Running with Scissors	Ripcord Games, Loki Entertainment, Running with Scissors, Akella (in Russia)
1998	Liquidator	MS-DOS	Partizan Software	Akella
2000	Sea Dogs	Windows	Akella	Bethesda Softworks
2001	Age of Sail II	Windows	Akella	Bethesda Softworks
2002	Privateers Bounty: Age of Sail II	Windows	Akella	1C Company
2003	Bomber Fun	Windows	LightBrain	Akella (in Russia)
2003	Postal 2	Windows	Running with Scissors	Whiptail Interactive, Running with Scissors, Akella (in Russia)
2003	Postal 2: Share the Pain	Windows	Running with Scissors	Whiptail Interactive, Running with Scissors, Akella (in Russia)
2003	Pirates of the Caribbean	Windows	Akella	Bethesda Softworks and 1C Company
2003	Postal 2: Apocalypse Weekend	Windows	Running with Scissors	Whiptail Interactive, Running with Scissors, Akella (in Russia)
2004	Sabotain: Break the Rules	Windows	Avalon Style Entertainment	Akella
2004	Red Skies Over Europe	Windows	Interactive Vision	Akella
2005	Metalheart: Replicants Rampage	Windows	Numlock Software	DreamCatcher and Akella
2005	Postal 2: Corkscrew Rules!	Windows	Avalon Style Entertainment	Akella
2006	Evil Days of Luckless John	Windows	Centauri Production	CINEMAX, Akella
2006	Tanita: Plasticine Dream	Windows	Trickster Games	Akella
2006	Mad Tracks	Windows	Load inc.	Akella (in Russia)
2006	Age of Pirates: Caribbean Tales	Windows	Akella	1C Company
2006	Sakura Wars	Windows	Sega, Red Entertainment	Akella (in Russia)
2007	Tarr Chronicles: Sign of Ghosts	Windows	Quazar Studio	Akella
2007	Galactic Assault: Prisoner of Power	Windows	Wargaming	Akella
2007	Inhabited Island: Prisoner of Power	Windows	Orion	Akella
2007	Hard to Be a God	Windows	Burut CT	Nobilis, Akella
2007	Swashbucklers: Blue vs. Grey	Windows	Akella	1C Company
2007	Empire Above All	Windows	Icehill	Akella
2007	Inhabited Island: The Earthling	Windows	Step Creative Group	Akella
2007	Dead Mountaineer's Hotel	Windows	Electronic Paradise	Akella
2008	Sakura Wars 2	Windows	Sega, Red Entertainment	Akella
2009	A Stroke of Fate: Operation Valkyrie	Windows	SPLine	Akella
2009	A Stroke of Fate: Operation Bunker	Windows	SPLine	Akella
2009	Age of Pirates 2: City of Abandoned Ships	Windows	Akella	Playlogic
2009	PT Boats: Knights of the Sea	Windows	Akella	Battlefront.com and Akella
2010	Disciples III: Renaissance	Windows	.dat [ru]	Akella (CIS), Kalypso Media (EU, NA)
2010	PT Boats: South Gambit	Windows	Akella	Battlefront.com, Akella
2011	Disciples III: Resurrection	Windows	.dat [ru]	Akella (CIS), Kalypso Media (EU, NA)
2011	Postal III	Windows	Trashmasters, Running with Scissors	Akella
2012	Disciples III: Reincarnation	Windows	hex Studio [ru]	Akella (CIS), Kalypso Media (EU, NA)
2012	Sea Dogs: To Each His Own	Windows	BlackMark Studio	Akella
