= Running with Scissors (company) =

American video game developer

Running with Scissors Studios LLC
- Logo used since 2021
- Formerly: RWS, Inc. (1998-2017)
- Type: Private
- Industry: Video games
- Predecessor: Riedel Software Productions
- Founded: 1996; 30 years ago
- Founders: Vince Desi; Mike Riedel
- Headquarters: Tucson, Arizona, U.S.
- Key people: Vince Desi (CEO); Mike Jaret-Schachter (VP)
- Products: Postal series (1997–present)
- Website: runningwithscissors.com

Running with Scissors Studios LLC (RWS) is an American video game developer based in Tucson, Arizona. RWS was formed in 1996 by Vince Desi and Mike Riedel as a mature label for Riedel Software Productions (RSP), a work for hire developer that mainly produced licensed titles aimed towards children. RWS is known for producing the Postal franchise, which has caused controversy with its use of violence and crude humor.

== History ==
=== 1984-1996: Origins and Riedel Software Productions ===
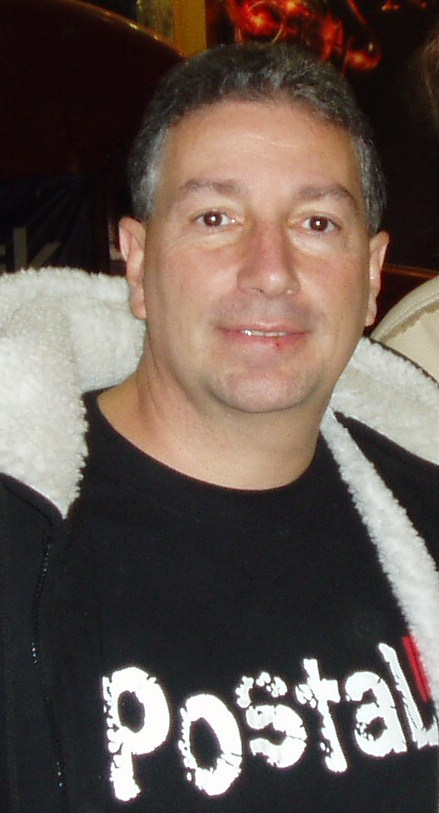
Vince Desi (pictured in 2006) has led Running with Scissors as its chief executive officer since its founding.

Running with Scissors was founded by Vincent James Desiderio Jr. and Michael J. Riedel. After a brief high school teaching career, Desiderio worked a variety of jobs throughout New York in the 1970s. While working as a recruiter on Wall Street, he adopted the short name "Desi" upon request from his boss. Seeking to recruit workers in the computer industry, Desi became a consultant for the video game company Atari, Inc. in the early 1980s.

The logo of Riedel Software Productions (RSP), the work for hire game developer that preceded Running with Scissors

At Atari, Desi hired and befriended Riedel, a young programmer and recent Rochester Institute of Technology dropout. With Desi as his business negotiator, Riedel created the 1984 game Spy vs. Spy for First Star Software and Mad magazine. The title was a critical and financial success, netting Riedel industry-wide recognition and spawning two sequels. Amidst Atari's ongoing financial instability following the video game crash of 1983, Desi and Riedel founded their own company, Riedel Software Productions, Inc. (RSP), in 1986. RSP specialized in developing games based on licensed properties on a work for hire basis, mainly producing family-oriented titles for Children's Television Workshop, The Walt Disney Company, Warner Bros., the World Wrestling Federation, and others. Notable releases include MicroLeague Wrestling (1987), an early display of digitized video game graphics, and Big Bird's Hide and Speak (1990), a fully-voiced NES title. Because Desi had no knowledge of programming and little interest in video games, he handled business affairs for the company, while Riedel was in charge of creative operations.

By the early 1990s, when Desi was 39, several factors led him to wish to relocate; Desi and Riedel discussed several potential cities—including Phoenix, Santa Fe, Albuquerque, and Seattle—before settling on Tucson, Arizona. Desi, Riedel and RSP moved to Tucson in late 1991. At the time, RSP consisted of the two founders and two employees. However, one of the employees did not turn up at John F. Kennedy International Airport, where the team was supposed to meet for the relocation, while the other quit two weeks following the relocation and moved back to New York. RSP opened its Tucson office in February 1992, and was welcomed to the city by officials and the Greater Tucson Economic Council. The company was among the list of companies (others including Hughes Electronics) honored for moving to the city in 1992. In Tucson, RSP continued developing licensed games for children, earning several awards and receiving letters of recommendation from high-profile clients. RSP's titles generated over US$1 million in sales in 1993, and by 1995, the company had moved to larger headquarters and grown to 21 employees.

=== 1996-1998: Running with Scissors and Postal ===
By 1996, RSP's employees were bored of developing children's titles. The studio had nearly closed after multiple canceled projects, and the staff took pay cuts. Desiring to produce games they would want to play themselves, Desi and Riedel established a new brand label, Running with Scissors (RWS), to allow RSP to develop mature games under a separate name. The label is a reference to children going against parental discipline, with Desi telling the Wall Street Journal that "We wanted to come up with something that we felt good about, that also got the message across, 'What did your mother tell you to do when you were a kid? Don't run with scissors.'" RWS was intended be run alongside RSP, drawing funding from RSP's sales and acting as RSP's edgier label. RSP was divided into three development teams: One, consisting of seven people, developed the first RWS title, one developed a game adaptation of the 1993 film Free Willy, and another developed an edutainment product for an academic publisher. Inspired by the 1982 arcade game Robotron: 2084, which had been playable at RSP's office, RWS began work on the shooter game Postal. Named after the slang term "going postal" the game sees the protagonist engage in mass murder throughout an Arizona town.

Following the reveal of Postal in early 1997, the United States Postal Service (USPS) counter-filed the trademark that RWS had filed for the word "Postal" in the area of electronic gaming. The USPS claimed it was moving into video games, and Marvin Travis Runyon, the United States Postmaster General at the time, sent RWS a letter condemning the game's theme. The legal battle was eventually dismissed with prejudice in June 2003. The theme also caused wider controversy within the media and the video game industry, to the surprise of Desi, who considered Postal to be more comical and "over-the-top" and stated that the game was not to be taken seriously. Postal was released in September 1997 for Windows and Mac OS as the first game of Ripcord Games, a publishing label of Matsushita Electric's Panasonic Interactive Media division. Following the release, the game was targeted by senator Joe Lieberman, who labeled it as one of the worst things in America, while retail chains CompUSA and Wal-Mart refused to sell the game. RSP's former children's game publishing clients ceased business with the studio due to its connection to Postal.

In its first week, Postal was sold over 10,000 times in the United States, and sales in Europe (where the game was released by Take-Two Interactive) were expected to reach 100,000. Desi estimated that the game generated roughly US$5 million in revenue. RWS followed up Postal with Special Delivery, an add-on of four levels released in August 1998 that allowed the player to murder lawyers, homeless people, and American Red Cross workers, among others. Postal Plus, a bundle composed of Postal and Special Delivery, released in 2000.

=== 1998-2006: Postal 2 and other projects ===
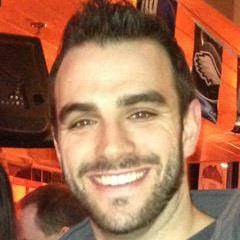
Mike Jaret-Schachter (pictured in 2016) joined the company in 2001 and now acts as vice president.

After Postal, Running with Scissors incorporated as RWS, Inc., a separate legal entity from RSP. The studio's next project became Flesh & Wire, an original three-dimensional sci-fi-themed game in which the player controls a blob-shaped character; Desi described the game as unintentionally funny. However, the game was canceled by Ripcord in 1999 alongside two unannounced games, and RWS turned to focus only on Postal. Consequently, RWS soon picked up development on Postal 2, a sequel to Postal. The company attempted to make its humor more evident than it was in the original game so it would reach a wider audience. When brainstorming ideas for the game, the team considered Gary Coleman, a former child actor known for his role in the show Diff'rent Strokes, as a good fit for the game's theme. Desi called up Coleman, who agreed to his inclusion and performed himself in the game. Postal 2 was released in April 2003 through publisher Whiptail Interactive. Postal 2 was shortly banned in 13 countries; New Zealand banned it in 2004 and Australia in 2005. Desi later struck a deal with the company Softwrap to have the game distributed online, which bypassed the bans. Due to the popularity of Postal 2, Whiptail released Postal: Classic and Uncut, containing the original Postal and Special Delivery, as well as a demo version of Postal 2, in August that year. This was followed by Share the Pain, a version of Postal 2 that introduced online multiplayer to the game. In Europe, this version was published by Greek company Hell-Tech. A separate expansion, Apocalypse Weekend, was released in 2005. The Postal Fudge Pack—a compilation containing the original Postal, Share the Pain, Apocalypse Weekend, the fan-made total conversion Eternal Damnation, and the fan-made mod A Week in Paradise—was released in November 2006. A similar compilation, Postal: 10th Anniversary Collector's Edition, was released the following year. Riedel left RWS in 2004, pivoting to engineering.

=== 2006-2012: Postal film and Postal III ===
During Postal 2's development, RWS got in contact with Uwe Boll, a director of video game-based films like House of the Dead, Alone in the Dark, and BloodRayne. Although Boll's films were usually received poorly, Desi believed that Boll's independent and anti-establishment attitude was a good fit for the Postal series. The resulting film was shot in the Vancouver area, with Desi playing himself as well as Krotchy, an anthropomorphic scrotum from the Postal universe. The film faced several issues, such as overlength and poor editing and marketing efforts, before premiering in 2007.

RWS' next game was Postal III; the company struck a deal with Russian publisher Akella that saw RWS create the script, music, design and character development for the game, which was then moved to Akella's in-house developers, Trashmasters, for programming and art production. During the development, however, the Russian economy fell and the development was mostly ramped down. Postal III was released in December 2011 to very poor reception, leading RWS to pull it from its online store the following year. Desi stated that the finished Postal III was "a product that should have never been published". RWS transitioned to a remote work environment in 2009.

=== 2012-present: Recent years ===
In April 2015, RWS released Paradise Lost, a new add-on for Postal 2 twelve years after the original game's release. In May 2016, RWS released a remake of the original Postal titled Postal Redux. Another compilation, Postal XX: 20th Anniversary Edition, was released in 2017. During this time, RWS reincorporated as Running with Scissors Studios LLC. RWS then released Postal 4: No Regerts, first as an early access game in October 2019 and then fully in April 2022. The company worked with developers Hyperstrange and CreativeForge Games on the spin-off Postal: Brain Damaged.

== Games ==
=== As Riedel Software Productions ===
==== Released ====
Release year	Title	Platforms	Publisher	Notes	Ref.
1987	MicroLeague Wrestling	Atari ST, Commodore 64	MicroLeague	Co-developed with Subway Software.	
1987	Big Bird's Special Delivery	Apple II	Hi Tech Expressions	Apple II conversion.	
1987	Ernie's Magic Shapes	Apple II	Hi Tech Expressions	Apple II conversion.	
1988	Matterhorn Screamer	Apple II, Commodore 64	Hi Tech Expressions	Apple II and Commodore 64 conversions.	
1988	The Chase on Tom Sawyer's Island	Apple II, Commodore 64	Hi Tech Expressions	Apple II and Commodore 64 conversions.	
1990	Win, Lose or Draw	Nintendo Entertainment System	Hi Tech Expressions	Nintendo Entertainment System conversion.	
1990	Remote Control	Nintendo Entertainment System	Hi Tech Expressions	Nintendo Entertainment System conversion.	
1990	The Bugs Bunny Hare-Brained Adventure	MS-DOS	Hi Tech Expressions		
1990	Chip 'n Dale Rescue Rangers: The Adventures in Nimnul's Castle	MS-DOS	Hi Tech Expressions		
1990	Big Bird's Hide and Speak	Nintendo Entertainment System	Hi Tech Expressions		
1991	Gremlins 2: The New Batch	MS-DOS	Hi Tech Expressions		
1991	Daffy Duck, P.I.: The Case of the Missing Letters	MS-DOS	Hi Tech Expressions		
1991	Adventures of Beetlejuice: Skeletons in the Closet	MS-DOS	Hi Tech Expressions		
1992	Sesame Street: Countdown	Nintendo Entertainment System	Hi Tech Expressions		
1993	The Hunt for Red October	Super Nintendo Entertainment System	Hi Tech Expressions		
1993	Tom and Jerry	Super Nintendo Entertainment System	Hi Tech Expressions		
1993	Beethoven: The Ultimate Canine Caper	Super Nintendo Entertainment System	Hi Tech Expressions		
1994	Sesame Street: Counting Cafe	Sega Genesis	EA Kids		
1995	Cartoon Jukebox	Mac OS, Windows	Philips Interactive Media	Mac OS and Windows ports.	
1995	Sandy's Circus Adventure	Mac OS, Windows	Philips Interactive Media	Mac OS and Windows ports.	
1995	The Dark Fables of Aesop	Mac OS, Windows	Philips Interactive Media	Mac OS and Windows ports.	
1996	Muppets Inside	Windows	Starwave	Additional development on Beaker's Brain and Scope that Song minigames.	
1997	Grolier's CornerStone Home	Mac OS, Windows	Grolier Interactive		
1997	Wishbone Activity Zone	Mac OS, Windows	Palladium Interactive		
1997	Barbie Fashion Designer	Mac OS	Mattel Media	Mac OS port.	

==== Canceled ====
Cancellation year	Title	Platforms	Publisher	Notes	Ref.
1993	Untitled Donkey Kong game	CD-i	Philips Interactive Media	Originally scheduled for late 1993.	
1994	Bobby's World	Sega Genesis, Super Nintendo Entertainment System	Hi Tech Entertainment	Originally scheduled for late 1994. A prototype of the SNES version was uploaded to a public bulletin board system by a warez group in October 1994.	
1995	Steven Seagal is the Final Option	Super Nintendo Entertainment System	TecMagik	Originally scheduled for early 1994 along with a Genesis version by a different developer. The game was delayed to early 1995 before being canceled. A prototype of the SNES version was later released online.	
1995	Free Willy	PC	Electronic Arts		
1995	Zootopia	CD-i, Mac OS, Windows	Philips Interactive Media		
1996	Gearheads	Super Nintendo Entertainment System	Philips Interactive Media	Originally scheduled for late 1996.	
Unknown	Casper	Sega Genesis, Super Nintendo Entertainment System	Hi Tech Entertainment		
Unknown	Droopy, Master Detective	PC	Hi Tech Entertainment		

=== As Running with Scissors ===
==== Released ====
Release year	Title	Platforms	Publisher	Notes	Ref.
1997	Postal	Android, Dreamcast, Linux, Mac OS, macOS, Windows	Ripcord Games		
2003	Postal 2	Linux, macOS, Windows	Whiptail Interactive		
2011	Postal III	Windows	Akella	Co-developed with Trashmasters.	
2016	Postal Redux	Linux, Nintendo Switch, PlayStation 4, Windows	Running with Scissors	Remaster of Postal.	
2022	Postal 4: No Regerts	PlayStation 4, PlayStation 5, Windows	Running with Scissors		
2022	Postal: Brain Damaged	Nintendo Switch, PlayStation 4, PlayStation 5, Windows	Hyperstrange, Running with Scissors	Developed by Hyperstrange and CreativeForge Games.	
2023	Poostall Royale	Windows	Running with Scissors	April Fools' joke.	
2027	Flesh & Wire	PlayStation 5, Windows	Running with Scissors		
TBA	Postal 2 VR	Meta Quest, PlayStation VR2, Windows	Flat2VR Studios	Developed by Team Beef.	
TBA	Postal 2 Redux	Linux, MacOS, Nintendo Switch, PlayStation 4, PlayStation 5, Windows, Xbox Series X/S	Flat2VR Studios	Developed by Team Beef.	

==== Canceled ====
Cancellation year	Title	Platforms	Publisher	Notes	Ref.
1999	Flesh & Wire	Dreamcast, GameCube, PlayStation 2	Ripcord Games		
1999	Guardian	Windows	Ripcord Games		
1999	New World Order	Windows	Ripcord Games		
2000	MobWorld	Unknown	Running with Scissors		
2025	Postal: Bullet Paradise	Nintendo Switch, PlayStation 4, PlayStation 5, Windows	Running with Scissors	Developed by Goonswarm Studios. Canceled in December 2025 after significant public backlash over the use of AI-generated art.	
