= List of Saw characters =

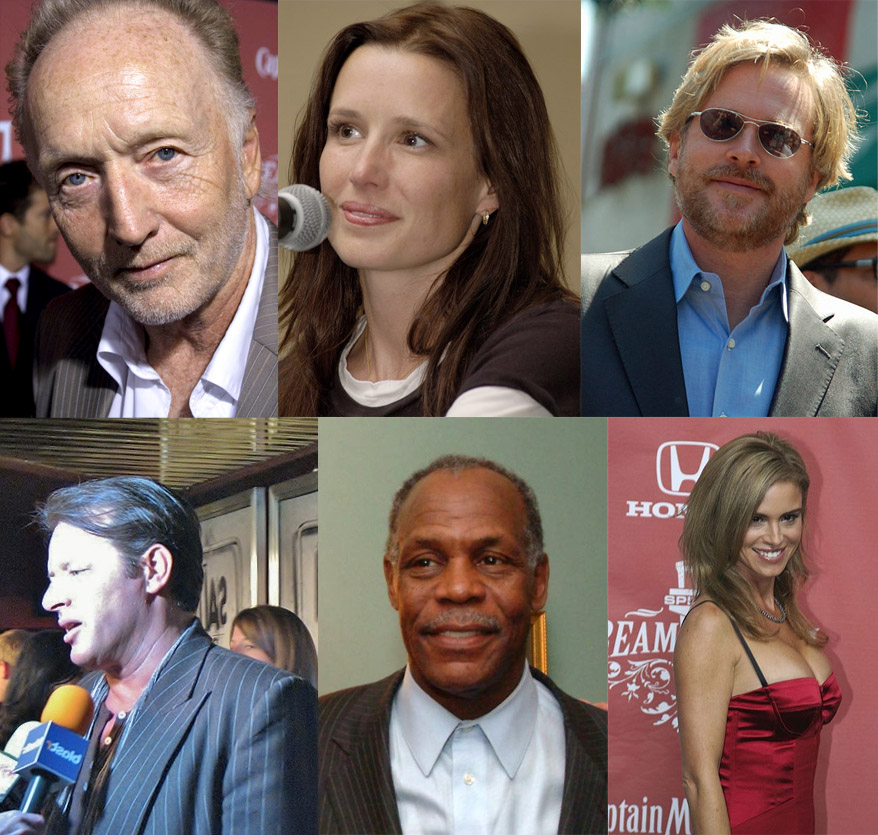
Actors who have portrayed central characters of the series. Top, left to right: Tobin Bell, Shawnee Smith, Cary Elwes. Bottom, left to right: Costas Mandylor, Danny Glover, Betsy Russell.

The Saw franchise features a large cast of characters created primarily by directors and screenwriters James Wan, Leigh Whannell, Darren Lynn Bousman, Patrick Melton, and Marcus Dunstan.

The films mainly focus on the character of John Kramer (Tobin Bell), the "Jigsaw Killer", who seeks out those he considers to be wasting their lives and subjects them to torturous and lethal traps, referred to as "tests" and "games", in an attempt to make them appreciate being alive.

The franchise consists of ten films: Saw (2004), Saw II (2005), Saw III (2006), Saw IV (2007), Saw V (2008), Saw VI (2009), Saw 3D (2010), Jigsaw (2017), Spiral (2021), and Saw X (2023).

== Overview ==
List indicators

This section includes characters who will appear or have appeared in more than two films in the series.

- An empty grey cell indicates the character was not in the film, or that the character's official presence has not yet been confirmed.
- ^{A} indicates an appearance through archival footage or audio.
- ^{C} indicates a cameo role.
- ^{P} indicates an appearance in onscreen photographs.
- ^{S} indicates an appearance through use of special effects.
- ^{V} indicates a voice-only role.
- ^{Y} indicates a younger version of the character.

Character	Films										Video games	
Character	Saw (2004)	II (2005)	III (2006)	IV (2007)	V (2008)	VI (2009)	3D (2010)	Jigsaw (2017)	Spiral (2021)	X (2023)	The Game (2009)	Flesh & Blood (2010)
=== Principal characters ===
John Kramer Jigsaw	Tobin Bell	Tobin Bell	Tobin Bell	Tobin Bell	Tobin Bell	Tobin Bell	Tobin Bell	Tobin Bell	Tobin Bell^{P}	Tobin Bell	Tobin Bell^{V}	Tobin Bell^{V}
Amanda Young	Shawnee Smith	Shawnee Smith	Shawnee Smith	Shawnee Smith^{A}	Shawnee Smith^{A}	Shawnee Smith	Shawnee Smith^{A}^{S}			Shawnee Smith	Jen Taylor^{V}	Jen Taylor^{M}
Lawrence Gordon	Cary Elwes	Cary Elwes^{V}^{S}	Cary Elwes^{C}	Cary Elwes^{M}	Cary Elwes^{M}	Cary Elwes^{M}	Cary Elwes				Cary Elwes^{M}	Cary Elwes^{M}
Mark Hoffman			Costas Mandylor	Costas Mandylor	Costas Mandylor	Costas Mandylor	Costas Mandylor			Costas Mandylor^{C}		Costas Mandylor^{M}
Jill Tuck			Betsy Russell	Betsy Russell	Betsy Russell	Betsy Russell	Betsy Russell	Betsy Russell^{M}				Betsy Russell^{M}
=== Recurring major characters ===
Adam Stanheight	Leigh Whannell	Leigh Whannell^{V}^{S}	Leigh Whannell^{C}		Leigh Whannell^{M}	Leigh Whannell^{A}^{V}^{S}	Leigh Whannell^{A}^{V}^{S}			Leigh Whannell^{A}^{S}	Leigh Whannell^{M}	
David Tapp	Danny Glover		Danny Glover^{A}		Danny Glover^{A}^{P}						Earl Alexander^{V}	Earl Alexander^{V}
Allison Kerry	Dina Meyer	Dina Meyer	Dina Meyer	Dina Meyer	Dina Meyer^{P}							Dina Meyer^{M}
Eric Matthews		Donnie Wahlberg	Donnie Wahlberg	Donnie Wahlberg	Donnie Wahlberg^{A}^{P}							
Xavier Chavez		Franky G	Franky G^{A}		Franky G^{C}^{P}		Franky G^{A}^{S}					
Addison Corday		Emmanuelle Vaugier	Emmanuelle Vaugier^{A}	Emmanuelle Vaugier^{A}	Emmanuelle Vaugier^{A}				Emmanuelle Vaugier^{P}			
Daniel Rigg		Lyriq Bent	Lyriq Bent	Lyriq Bent	Lyriq Bent^{A}^{P}							
Jeff Denlon			Angus Macfadyen	Angus Macfadyen^{C}	Angus Macfadyen^{A}	Angus Macfadyen^{A}	Angus Macfadyen^{M}					
Peter Strahm				Scott Patterson	Scott Patterson	Scott Patterson^{A}						
Dan Erickson					Mark Rolston	Mark Rolston						
=== Major characters (single-media) ===
Steven Sing	Ken Leung		Ken Leung^{A}		Ken Leung^{P}						Ken Leung^{M}	Ken Leung^{M}
Zep Hindle	Michael Emerson	Michael Emerson^{V}	Michael Emerson^{A}		Michael Emerson^{M}		Michael Emerson^{A}			Michael Emerson^{A}		Michael Emerson^{M}
Alison Gordon	Monica Potter	Monica Potter^{M}									Monica Potter^{M}	Monica Potter^{M}
Daniel Matthews		Erik Knudsen	Erik Knudsen^{A}	Erik Knudsen^{P}	Erik Knudsen^{C}		Erik Knudsen^{A}^{S}					
Jonas Singer		Glenn Plummer	Glenn Plummer^{A}		Glenn Plummer^{P}							
Laura Hunter		Beverley Mitchell	Beverley Mitchell^{A}		Beverley Mitchell^{C}							
Lynn Denlon			Bahar Soomekh	Bahar Soomekh^{A}	Bahar Soomekh^{A}	Bahar Soomekh^{A}	Bahar Soomekh^{A}					
Brit Stevenson					Julie Benz	Julie Benz^{M}						
Luba Gibbs					Meagan Good	Meagan Good^{M}						
Charles Salomon					Carlo Rota	Carlo Rota^{M}						
William Easton						Peter Outerbridge	Peter Outerbridge^{P}					
Bobby Dagen							Sean Patrick Flanery					
Logan Nelson								Matt Passmore				
Brad Halloran								Callum Keith Rennie				
Eleanor Bonneville								Hannah Emily Anderson				
Keith Hunt								Clé Bennett				
Zeke Banks									Chris Rock			
William Schenk William Emmerson									Max Minghella Leonidas Castrounis^{Y}			
Angie Garza									Marisol Nichols			
Marcus Banks									Samuel L. Jackson			
Cecilia Pederson										Synnøve Macody Lund		
Parker Sears										Steven Brand		
Gabriela										Renata Vaca		
Diego										Joshua Okamoto		
Mateo										Octavio Hinojosa		
Valentina										Paulette Hernández		
Henry Kessler										Michael Beach		
Campbell Iman												Voice
Michael Tapp												Voice
=== Recurring supporting characters ===
Paul Leahy	Mike Butters		Mike Butters^{A}	Mike Butters	Mike Butters	Mike Butters^{A}						Mike Butters^{M}
Jeff Ridenhour	Ned Bellamy				Ned Bellamy^{M}						Dex Manley^{V}	Dex Manley^{M}
Carla Song	Alexandra Bokyun Chun											Alexandra Bokyun Chun^{V}
Donnie Greco	Oren Koules		Oren Koules	Oren Koules	Oren Koules^{M}	Oren Koules^{A}					Oren Koules^{M}	Oren Koules^{M}
Obi Tate		Timothy Burd	Timothy Burd		Timothy Burd		Timothy Burd^{A}		Timothy Burd^{P}		Marc Carr^{V}	Marc Carr^{M}
Michael Marks		Noam Jenkins	Noam Jenkins^{A}	Noam Jenkins	Noam Jenkins^{M}		Noam Jenkins^{C}					
Gus Colyard		Tony Nappo	Tony Nappo^{A}	Tony Nappo	Tony Nappo							
SWAT Member Pete		Kelly Jones	Kelly Jones	Kelly Jones								
SWAT Member Joe		Vincent Rother	Vincent Rother									
Timothy Young			Mpho Koaho		Mpho Koaho^{M}	Mpho Koaho^{C}						
Troy			J. Larose	J. Larose								
Corbett Denlon			Niamh Wilson	Niamh Wilson	Niamh Wilson	Niamh Wilson^{C}						
Nurse Deborah			Kim Roberts	Kim Roberts								
Lindsey Perez				Athena Karkanis	Athena Karkanis^{A}	Athena Karkanis						
Detective Fisk				Mike Realba	Mike Realba							
Cecil Adams				Billy Otis	Billy Otis^{M}	Billy Otis						Billy Otis^{M}
Dr. Adam Heffner				James Van Patten		James Van Patten	James Van Patten					
Trevor				Kevin Rushton			Kevin Rushton^{C}					
Mallick Scott					Greg Bryk	Greg Bryk^{M}	Greg Bryk					
Pamela Jenkins					Samantha Lemole	Samantha Lemole	Samantha Lemole^{M}				Samantha Lemole^{M}	
Simone						Tanedra Howard	Tanedra Howard					
Addy						Janelle Hutchison	Janelle Hutchison					
Tara Abbott						Shauna MacDonald	Shauna MacDonald					
Emily						Larissa Gomes	Larissa Gomes					
Jennings Foster											Troy Lund^{V}	Troy Lund^{V}
=== Supporting characters (single-media) ===
Mark Wilson	Paul Gutrecht		Paul Gutrecht^{A}		Paul Gutrecht^{M}							Paul Gutrecht^{M}
Brett	Benito Martinez											
Diana Gordon	Makenzie Vega										Makenzie Vega^{M}	Makenzie Vega^{M}
Judge Halden			Barry Flatman		Barry Flatman^{M}							
Danica Scott			Debra McCabe		Debra McCabe^{M}							
Chris			Alan van Sprang									
Art Blank				Justin Louis	Justin Louis^{A}		Justin Louis^{P}					Justin Louis^{M}
Officer Lamanna				Simon Reynolds								
Ivan Landsness				Marty Adams								
Brenda				Sarain Boylan								
Vagrant				Julian Richings								
Morgan				Janet Land								
Rex				Ron Lea								
Ashley Kazon					Laura Gordon	Laura Gordon^{M}						
Seth Baxter					Joris Jarsky	Joris Jarsky^{A}						Joris Jarsky^{M}
Chief of Police					Al Sapienza	Al Sapienza^{A}						
Eddie						Marty Moreau						
Allen						Shawn Ahmed	Shawn Ahmed^{M}					
Hank						Gerry Mendicino	Garry Mendicino^{M}					
Debbie						Caroline Cave	Caroline Cave^{M}					
Harold Abbott						George Newbern						
Brent Abbott						Devon Bostick	Devon Bostick^{M}					
Dave						Darius McCrary	Darius McCrary^{M}					
Josh						Shawn Mathieson	Shawn Mathieson^{M}					
Gena						Melanie Scrofano	Melanie Scrofano^{M}					
Shelby						Karen Cliche	Karen Cliche^{M}					
Aaron						James Gilbert	James Gilbert^{M}					
Matt Gibson							Chad Donella					
Joyce Dagen							Gina Holden					
Cale							Dean Armstrong					
Nina							Naomi Snieckus					
Suzanne							Rebecca Marshall					
Brad							Sebastian Pigott					
Ryan							Jon Cor					
Evan							Chester Bennington					
Anna								Laura Vandervoort				
Ryan								Paul Braunstein				
Mitch								Mandela Van Peebles				
Carly								Brittany Allen				
Edgar Munsen								Josiah Black				
Marv Bozwick									Dan Petronijevic			
Detective Fitch									Richard Zeppieri			
Peter Dunleavy									Patrick McManus			
Jeannie Lewis									Ali Johnson			
Kara Bozwick									Zoie Palmer			
Morgey Silva									Dylan Roberts			
Detective Drury									K. C. Collins			
Deborah Kraus									Edie Inksetter			
Coroner Chada									Nazneen Contractor			
Tim O'Brien									Thomas Mitchell			
Speez									Chris Ramsay			
Lisa Banks									Genelle Williams			
Pat Jones									Trevor Gretzky			
Melissa Sing											Kahn Doan^{V}	Kahn Doan^{M}
Oswald McGullicuty	Mentioned										David Scully^{V}	David Scully^{M}

== Saw ==
=== Adam Stanheight ===
- Portrayed by Leigh Whannell
- Appears in: Saw, Saw II, Saw III, Saw V (mentioned only), Saw VI, Saw 3D, Saw X, Saw II: Flesh & Blood (mentioned only)
- Status: Deceased
- Died in: Sometime between Saw and Saw II (actual); Saw III (depicted)

Adam Stanheight is a freelance photographer who was hired by the discharged detective David Tapp to follow Dr. Lawrence Gordon, an oncologist whom Tapp suspected of being the Jigsaw Killer. Adam is kidnapped by Jigsaw's apprentice, Amanda Young and placed in a game alongside Dr. Gordon. Adam was targeted by Jigsaw because of his spy work, whereas Dr. Gordon was targeted for his cold and uncaring nature, as well as for cheating on his wife. The two men are chained to pipes on opposite sides of a large dilapidated industrial bathroom, with an apparent corpse (holding a tape recorder and a revolver) in the middle, and are given instructions via cassette tape. Adam's tape urges him to survive, while Dr. Gordon's instructs him to kill Adam by six o'clock. Adam discovers a bag containing two hacksaws, which they unsuccessfully attempt to use on their chains; Adam's saw breaks, causing him to become enraged and hurl the broken saw at a mirror. Dr. Gordon deduces that the saws are actually intended for their feet, and subsequently realises that they were kidnapped by Jigsaw, whom he knows about because he was once a suspect in the case. At six o'clock, desperate to save his family, Dr. Gordon saws off his own foot, much to Adam's horror, and shoots Adam with the apparent corpse's revolver, despite Adam pleading for his life. Adam survives the gunshot, but plays dead. Zep Hindle, an orderly from Dr. Gordon's hospital, opens the door to the bathroom. As he is about to kill Dr. Gordon, Adam rises and bludgeons Zep Hindle to death with a toilet tank lid, believing him to be Jigsaw and therefore responsible for their abduction. Dr. Gordon crawls away to get help, promising to return to Adam. While searching Zep's body for a key, Adam finds a tape recorder that reveals that Zep was also a victim in the game, and was following instructions from Jigsaw in order to obtain an antidote for a slow-acting poison in his bloodstream. As the tape ends, the apparent corpse gets up and is revealed to be John Kramer, the actual Jigsaw. When Adam tries to shoot him, Jigsaw incapacitates him with an electric shock and seals the bathroom door, telling Adam "Game over" and leaving him to die. In Saw II, Adam's corpse is seen (along with that of Zep), revealing that he died some time after the events of Saw. In Saw III, it is revealed that Amanda asphyxiated him with a plastic bag in a mercy killing.

Adam's name is seen in Saw V, as Special Agent Peter Strahm browses through FBI documents of potential Jigsaw victims. His name was listed as 'Adam Stanheight'. Adam also appears in archival footage in Saw VI and Saw 3D.

Adam's decomposing corpse is seen in Saw II, Saw III, Saw 3D and the post-credits scene of Saw X. In Saw II: Flesh & Blood, Adam is mentioned in Tapp's files and audio tapes as having been hired by one of Tapp's colleagues to prove his wife was having an affair, implying this was why Tapp hired him.

=== Alison and Diana Gordon ===
- Portrayed by Monica Potter and Makenzie Vega
- Appear in: Saw, Saw II (Alison mentioned only)
- Status: Both alive

Alison and Diana Gordon are the wife and daughter of Dr. Lawrence Gordon. They are held hostage by Zep Hindle as a part of Dr. Gordon's test; one of Jigsaw's reasons for testing Dr. Gordon was because Dr. Gordon had cheated on his wife, as well as being cold and uncaring towards his daughter. Dr. Gordon is ordered to kill Adam, who is chained up in the bathroom with him, by six o'clock, or else Alison and Diana will be killed. When Dr. Gordon fails to do so, Zep attempts to kill both Alison and Diana, but they are rescued by Detective David Tapp. The DVD commentary for Saw 3D reveals Alison divorced Dr. Gordon because of his unstable mindset.

=== Allison Kerry ===
- Portrayed by Dina Meyer
- Appears in: Saw, Saw II, Saw III, Saw IV, Saw V, Saw II: Flesh & Blood (mentioned only)
- Status: Deceased
- Died in: Saw III

Allison Kerry is a highly experienced detective with specialized knowledge of the Jigsaw case. She has a deep understanding of his methods and motivations, making her an invaluable asset to the investigation. She first appears in Saw, working alongside Detectives David Tapp and Steven Sing. In Saw II, she works with Detective Eric Matthews and Officer Daniel Rigg in order to try to save Eric's son Daniel. In Saw III, after Eric disappears and is presumed dead, Kerry becomes wracked with guilt. She and Detective Mark Hoffman are called to the scene of an inescapable trap, and Kerry is the first to suspect that someone else was responsible, as the trap did not follow Jigsaw's M.O. She is later captured and placed in her own trap, but even though she follows the rules, the trap (which was built and rigged by Amanda Young) tears her rib cage apart, killing her. Her corpse is later discovered by Officer Rigg and the FBI. It is revealed in Saw IV that Kerry's first name is Allison, as seen on a file observed by Officer Rigg. In Saw V, a police memorial service is held honoring those who died in their effort to close the Jigsaw case; Kerry is among the officers honored.

=== Amanda Young ===
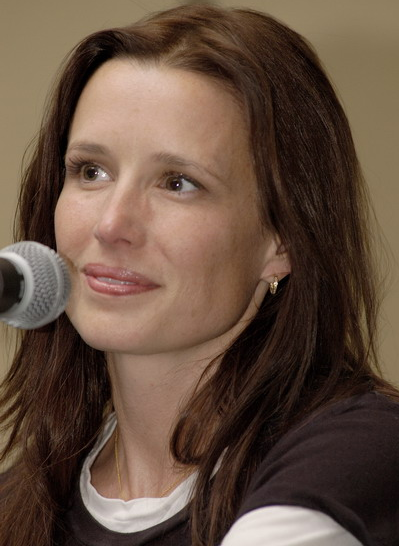
Shawnee Smith portrayed Amanda Young, John Kramer's apprentice.

- Portrayed by Shawnee Smith (film) and Jen Taylor (game)
- Appears in: Saw: Rebirth, Saw, Saw II, Saw III, Saw IV, Saw V, Saw VI, Saw 3D, Saw X, Saw: The Video Game, Saw II: Flesh & Blood (mentioned only), Dead by Daylight: The Saw Chapter
- Status: Deceased
- Died in: Saw III

In Saw, Amanda Young is introduced as a heroin addict, and the first person to survive one of Jigsaw's "games" (notably, the only known survivor at the time of Saw), who ultimately believes that John helped her. She was placed in a "reverse bear trap" that was hooked into her jaws and was set to wrench her jaws apart with great force once the timer reached zero. She was forced to kill and disembowel a man to obtain a key to unlock the device. It is revealed in Saw II that after her test John recruited her as his apprentice; Amanda was intended to carry out John's legacy. In Saw III, however, it is revealed that Amanda has become disillusioned with his philosophy and starts designing inescapable traps, believing that the trap victims are incapable of change. Unwilling to let a murderer continue his legacy, John designs a test in which Amanda must prove that she has what it takes to carry on with it, but she ultimately fails when she shoots Lynn Denlon, and Lynn's husband Jeff Denlon retaliates by shooting Amanda. Amanda's corpse is seen in Saw IV and Saw V, and she appears in flashbacks in Saw V, Saw VI, and Saw 3D. In Saw VI it is revealed that Mark Hoffman blackmailed Amanda into killing Lynn, using the knowledge that she had a role in Jill Tuck's miscarriage.

=== Billy ===
- Voiced by Tobin Bell
- Appears in: Saw (short), Saw: Rebirth, Saw, Saw II, Saw III, Saw IV, Saw V, Saw VI, Saw 3D, Saw X, Jigsaw, Saw: The Video Game, Saw II: Flesh & Blood
- Status: Some confiscated/Most destroyed

Billy is a ventriloquist puppet created by John Kramer to communicate with his victims. Billy usually appears on a TV screen when talking to victims, but sometimes appears in person, often riding a tricycle. Billy gives the victims instructions on how to escape their traps before the time expires. Billy has also appeared in every adaptation of Saw, becoming an icon of the series. It is revealed in Saw IV that Billy was based on an earlier puppet originally created for John and Jill Tuck's unborn son Gideon, and that John's unresolved anger after Jill suffered a miscarriage after a drug addict slammed a door into her led to John using a more sinister version of the puppet to communicate with his test subjects.

=== Carla ===
- Portrayed by Alexandra Bokyun Chun (film)
- Appears in: Saw, Saw II: Flesh & Blood
- Status: Deceased
- Died in: Saw II: Flesh & Blood

Carla Song is a medical student at St. Eustice Hospital, and Dr. Lawrence Gordon's mistress; Lawrence's affair with her is one of the reasons why he was targeted by Jigsaw. She plays a larger role in the video game Saw II: Flesh & Blood where she is targeted by Jigsaw for stealing vital pharmaceuticals and selling them on the street for profit. She is found by Michael Tapp with her arms secured to the ceiling of an elevator shaft and her legs secured to the roof of an elevator. Michael is tasked with completing a test in order to release her safely; if he fails, the elevator will lower, and tear Carla in half. It is revealed that she is part of a criminal conspiracy alongside Henry Jacobs, Joseph Poltzer, and Sarah Blalok; Carla being responsible for procuring more specialist items from her clinic. Even though she and Michael work together, she is soon left with Henry, who slashes her to death with a pair of scissors.

=== David Tapp ===
- Portrayed by Danny Glover (film) and Earl Alexander (game)
- Appears in: Saw, Saw III, Saw V, Saw: The Video Game, Saw II: Flesh & Blood, Dead by Daylight: The Saw Chapter
- Status: Deceased
- Died in: Saw: The Video Game

David Tapp is a detective assigned to investigate the earlier Jigsaw crimes. Evidence leads him to suspect that Dr. Lawrence Gordon is the Jigsaw Killer. Tapp and his partner Steven Sing later find Jigsaw's warehouse, but before they can apprehend him, he activates a trap, which threatens the life of Jeff Ridenhour. Sing rushes to help the victim while Tapp attempts to arrest Jigsaw, but Jigsaw slashes Tapp's throat with a concealed blade and flees. When Sing pursues Jigsaw, he is killed by a shotgun booby trap for which Tapp blames himself. Tapp is subsequently discharged from the force, but continues to obsess over finding Jigsaw.

Tapp monitors the Gordons' residence, still convinced that Dr. Gordon is Jigsaw, and rushes over after hearing gunshots. There he finds Alison and Diana Gordon being held captive by Zep Hindle. Zep flees and is pursued by Tapp; the chase leads to an underground room where Tapp is shot after a brief struggle and left for dead. In Saw: The Video Game, it is shown that Tapp was nursed back to health by Jigsaw and placed in a series of traps in an asylum, forced to overcome tests and other victims sent to kill him. In the game's "Freedom" ending, Tapp manages to escape from the asylum, but is unable to overcome his obsession with Jigsaw and ultimately commits suicide some time afterwards. Saw II: Flesh & Blood shows newspapers reporting Tapp's suicide. In Saw V, a police memorial service is held honoring those who died in their effort to close the Jigsaw case; Tapp is among the officers honored.

=== Donnie Greco ===
- Portrayed by Oren Koules
- Appears in: Saw, Saw III, Saw IV, Saw V (mentioned only), Saw VI, Saw: The Video Game (mentioned only), Saw II: Flesh & Blood (mentioned only)
- Status: Deceased
- Died in: Saw

Donnie Greco first appears in Saw. He is Amanda Young's drug dealer and cellmate. As a part of Amanda's game, he is heavily tranquilized (injected with an opioid overdose) and unable to move or feel anything (Jigsaw claims, in his instructions to Amanda, that Donnie is dead). The key to unlock her trap is placed in his stomach, and to get it, Amanda has to stab him to death and cut him open. Donnie is seen again in a flashback in Saw III in which Jigsaw is shown preparing the trap. He appears again in a flashback in Saw IV exiting Jill's health clinic with Paul Leahy.

=== Jeff Ridenhour ===
- Portrayed by Ned Bellamy (film) and Dex Manley (game)
- Appears in: Saw, Saw V (mentioned only), Saw: The Video Game, Saw II: Flesh & Blood (mentioned only)
- Status: Deceased
- Died in: Saw II: Flesh & Blood

Jeff Ridenhour first appears in Saw as a victim of one of Jigsaw's experimental traps. He is bound to a chair with two drills aimed at his neck. Jigsaw activates the trap, and the drills slowly move towards Jeff's neck. Jigsaw tells Detective Steven Sing that the key to free him is in a box with dozens of others. Without enough time to try all the keys, Sing shoots the drills to stop them.

Jeff later appears in Saw: The Video Game. He is shown to have become suicidal due to trauma. As such, Jigsaw kidnaps Jeff once again and places him in a trap that would impale him with spikes. Detective Tapp manages to free him, but an injured Jeff runs away and leaves Tapp behind. During the events of Saw II: Flesh & Blood, it is revealed that two days after Jeff escaped from the asylum, he committed suicide.

=== John Kramer ===
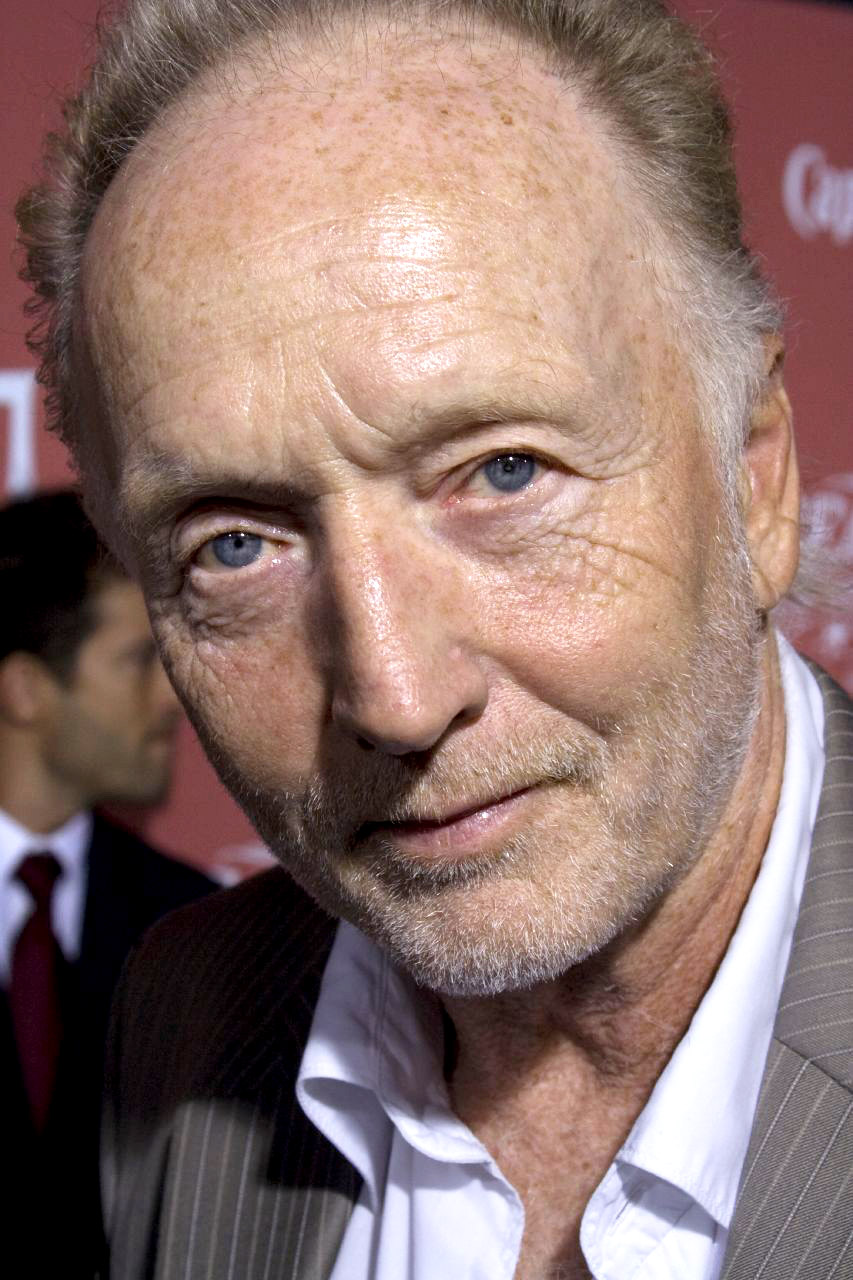
Tobin Bell has portrayed John Kramer ("Jigsaw") in the films and video games.

- Portrayed by Tobin Bell (film/game) and George Williams (animated comic)
- Appears in: Saw: Rebirth, Saw, Saw II, Saw III, Saw IV, Saw V, Saw VI, Saw 3D, Jigsaw, Spiral (photographs), Saw X, Saw: The Video Game, Saw II: Flesh & Blood
- Status: Deceased
- Died in: Saw III

John Kramer was a successful civil engineer and toymaker. He was married to Jill Tuck, who was expecting a son, to be named Gideon. Following the miscarriage of his son caused by Cecil Adams and Amanda Young, John became distraught and later learned he had an aggressive inoperable brain tumor. He attempted suicide but ultimately survived, finding a new appreciation for life. Using his wealth and skill, John began testing others' will to live by placing them in deadly traps, which he referred to as "games" or "tests", in which they are forced to make choices; in doing so, he hoped survivors would gain a new appreciation for their lives. He frequently communicated with his test subjects using a ventriloquist puppet that he created based on an earlier puppet that he had intended to give to his unborn son. He would cut the shape of a puzzle piece from the remains of those who failed, to represent they were missing "the survival instinct", leading to him being nicknamed "The Jigsaw Killer", or simply "Jigsaw", by the media (a nickname that John himself disapproved of). Although John dies after his throat is slashed by Jeff Denlon in Saw III, he appears in flashbacks throughout the series.

=== Lawrence Gordon ===
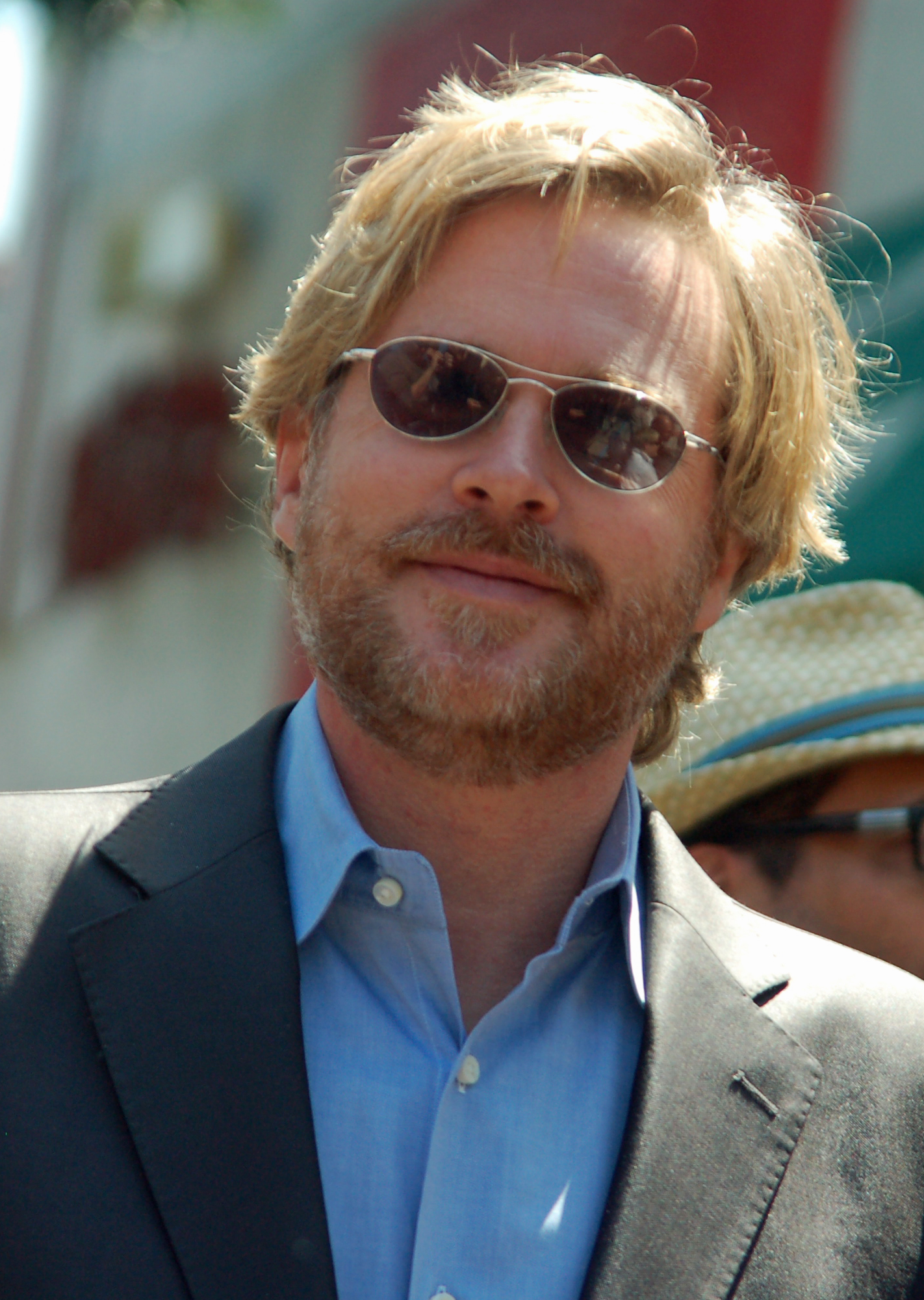
Cary Elwes portrayed Lawrence Gordon in the first film and returned for the seventh film.

- Portrayed by Cary Elwes (film) and Stan Kirsch (animated comic)
- Appears in: Saw: Rebirth, Saw, Saw II, Saw III, Saw IV (mentioned only), Saw V (mentioned only), Saw VI (mentioned only), Saw 3D, Saw: The Video Game (mentioned only), Saw II: Flesh & Blood (mentioned only)
- Status: Alive

Lawrence Gordon is a physician who diagnosed John Kramer's terminal cancer and was initially a suspect in the Jigsaw murder case (after a penlight found at the scene of one of Jigsaw's games was linked to him). John targets Lawrence for being cold and uncaring towards his patients and his family, and for cheating on his wife with Carla Song, a medical student. Lawrence is abducted and placed in a trap where he is chained up in a dilapidated bathroom alongside Adam Stanheight. He is told that he must kill Adam before six o'clock; if he does not do so, his wife Alison and daughter Diana will be killed, and he will be left to die in the bathroom. He fails to kill Adam, but saws off his own foot using a hacksaw that Adam found to free himself from his shackle, and crawls away to get help, promising Adam he will bring someone back (although Adam is subsequently revealed to be dead in Saw II).

Lawrence's decaying severed foot is shown in Saw II, Saw III and Saw 3D. His fate is unknown until Saw 3D, when it is revealed that Lawrence survived his test by using a hot steam pipe to cauterize his ankle stump, before passing out shortly afterwards. John found Lawrence in the corridor and congratulated him for surviving. He then helped Lawrence recover, and gave him a prosthetic foot.

John recruited Lawrence as an apprentice afterwards, and Lawrence used his medical skills to prepare a variety of traps for John, such as putting the key in Michael Marks' eye in the Venus flytrap (Saw II), as well as sewing Art Blank's mouth and Trevor's eyes shut for the mausoleum trap (Saw IV). He also selected Lynn Denlon as John's surgeon (Saw III) and wrote an anonymous message to Detective Mark Hoffman (Saw V) stating "I know who you are". Following John's death, his ex-wife Jill Tuck delivered a package to Lawrence that had been left to her in John's will; it contained a videotape with instructions from John to watch over Jill and act immediately if anything was to happen to her. When Hoffman kills Jill and attempts to flee the city, he is ambushed by three people in pig masks, one of whom is revealed to be Lawrence. After chaining Hoffman by the ankle to the pipes in the bathroom, Lawrence picks up the hacksaw he had used to sever his own foot and throws it into the corridor. He then turns off the lights and leaves, telling Hoffman "Game over", before closing the door and leaving Hoffman to die in the bathroom, with no means of escape.

Lawrence also attends Bobby Dagen's support group meeting for Jigsaw survivors in Saw 3D.

=== Mark Wilson ===
- Portrayed by Paul Gutrecht
- Appears in: Saw: Rebirth, Saw, Saw III, Saw V (mentioned only), Saw II: Flesh & Blood (mentioned only)
- Status: Deceased
- Died in: Saw

Mark Wilson, a 30-year-old software analyst, is one of Jigsaw's earliest victims, targeted because he feigned illness to excuse himself from his responsibilities. Mark is stripped naked and informed that he has a slow-acting poison in his body, the antidote to which is locked in a safe in the room. Mark has to walk over a floor covered in broken glass and use a candle to read the safe combination written on the wall, wary that his flesh is smeared with a highly flammable jelly-like substance. Just as he gets the safe open, Mark eventually fumbles with the candle, burning himself alive, and his charred corpse, with the shape of a puzzle piece cut out of it, is later found by police. It is shown in Saw V that his surname is Wilson, as indicated by a document observed by Agent Peter Strahm.

=== Paul ===
- Portrayed by Mike Butters
- Appears in: Saw: Rebirth, Saw, Saw III, Saw IV, Saw V, Saw VI, Saw II: Flesh & Blood (mentioned only)
- Status: Deceased
- Died in: Saw

Paul is one of John's earliest victims, chosen because he attempted suicide by cutting his wrists despite having a good life with a wife and kids. Paul is placed in a large cage lined with a maze of razor wire and is given two hours to crawl his way to freedom; ironically if Paul wants to live, he will be forced to cut himself again, but if he wants to die, all he has to do is wait. Paul attempts to escape, but fails to reach the exit in time and subsequently bleeds to death; Jigsaw subsequently cuts the shape of a puzzle piece from his remains. Paul's corpse is found by police, covered with very deep cuts and in an early stage of decomposition, some time after his death. Paul is later seen in Saw IV leaving Jill's drug clinic. In Saw V, Paul is shown being kidnapped by both John and Mark Hoffman for his test in Saw.

=== Steven Sing ===
- Portrayed by Ken Leung
- Appears in: Saw, Saw III, Saw V, Saw: The Video Game (mentioned only), Saw II: Flesh & Blood (mentioned only)
- Status: Deceased
- Died in: Saw

Steven Sing is one of the first detectives assigned to the Jigsaw case. He and his partner, David Tapp, use clues from a video tape to find Jigsaw's warehouse. There, they find Jeff Ridenhour in a trap with drills aimed at his neck. Jigsaw enters the room shortly afterwards and activates the device when the officers hold him at gunpoint, forcing them to choose between arresting him or saving Jeff. Sing shoots the drills and pursues Jigsaw through the warehouse, after Jigsaw slashes Tapp's throat with a hidden wrist blade. While pursuing him, Sing accidentally activates a tripwire that triggers four shotguns overhead to discharge, killing him instantly. Tapp blames himself for Sing's death, which ultimately causes him to obsess over capturing Jigsaw. In Saw V, a police memorial service is held honoring those who died in their effort to close the Jigsaw case; Sing is among the officers honored.

It is shown in the video game that Sing has a wife named Melissa and a son named Franklin. Melissa encounters Tapp during the game and blames him for the death of her husband. Sing is also frequently mentioned in tapes and documents.

=== Zep Hindle ===
- Portrayed by Michael Emerson (film) and Jeff Shuter (animated comic)
- Appears in: Saw: Rebirth, Saw, Saw II, Saw III, Saw V (mentioned only), Saw 3D, Saw X, Saw II: Flesh & Blood (mentioned only)
- Status: Deceased
- Died in: Saw

Zep Hindle is an orderly who works at St. Eustice Hospital, where John Kramer is being treated for his cancer. He forms a bond with John while he is being treated, but John considers him to have "issues of his own". Zep is forced to monitor Adam Stanheight and Dr. Lawrence Gordon's game, in order to obtain the antidote for the slow-acting poison in his blood stream. He is instructed to hold Alison and Diana Gordon captive and kill both them and Lawrence if the latter does not kill Adam by six o'clock. Lawrence fails to kill Adam, but Alison and Diana manage to escape when Detective David Tapp arrives and chases Zep to an underground sewage system. After shooting Tapp, Zep proceeds to the site of Adam and Lawrence's test. Zep prepares to kill Lawrence since he shot Adam after the deadline, but Adam, having survived the gunshot, knocks Zep to the floor and bludgeons him to death with a toilet tank cover, believing him to be their captor. After killing Zep, Adam finds a tape in his pocket containing instructions from Jigsaw, and discovers that Zep was in fact another victim, moments before Jigsaw himself, John Kramer, reveals his identity to Adam. Zep's decomposing corpse is shown in the bathroom in Saw II, Saw III, Saw 3D and the post-credits scene of Saw X .

== Saw II ==
=== Addison ===
- Portrayed by Emmanuelle Vaugier
- Appears in: Saw II, Saw III, Saw IV, Saw V, Spiral (photographs)
- Status: Deceased
- Died in: Saw II

Addison is a prostitute, and a victim in the nerve gas house. Like the other victims, she was framed by Detective Eric Matthews. She attempts to work with the other captives to survive, but upon learning that another victim, Daniel, is Eric's son, she begins working alone to find an antidote. She reaches into a glass box to retrieve an antidote, and her arms get caught in the razor blade lined sockets. Xavier Chavez finds her, but leaves her to bleed to death after reading the number on the back of her neck. In a flashback in Saw IV, she is seen offering John Kramer her services, prior to John becoming the Jigsaw Killer. In a flashback in Saw V, she is seen lying unconscious as John and Mark Hoffman set up the nerve gas house. Her mug shot appears on the wall in Spiral.

=== Daniel Matthews ===
- Portrayed by Erik Knudsen
- Appears in: Saw II, Saw III, Saw IV, Saw V, Saw 3D
- Status: Alive

Daniel Matthews is the son of Detective Eric Matthews. After a falling out with his father, Daniel goes missing but is revealed to have been captured and placed in the nerve gas house, with seven people who had served prison terms after being framed by Eric. As the game progresses, Daniel's lineage is discovered, and he is abandoned by the other victims. Amanda Young returns after discovering Jonas Singer's body, and they attempt to flee from Xavier Chavez. The chase leads to the bathroom from Saw, and Daniel slices Xavier's throat with a hacksaw, killing him. After these events, Amanda (revealed to be John Kramer's apprentice) takes an unconscious Daniel to John's lair where he is locked in a safe for Eric's test; the safe opens after a two-hour timer expires, and he is found by a SWAT team, with a mask that provided him with oxygen while in the safe. Daniel appears in a flashback in Saw V, lying unconscious on the floor, while John and Mark Hoffman prepare the nerve gas house. In Saw 3D he appears in another flashback, this time with Amanda in the bathroom at the end of Saw II.

=== Daniel Rigg ===
- Portrayed by Lyriq Bent
- Appears in: Saw II, Saw III, Saw IV, Saw V
- Status: Deceased
- Died in: Saw IV

Daniel Rigg is a SWAT commander that first appears in Saw II, assisting Detectives Eric Matthews and Allison Kerry in apprehending Jigsaw. In Saw IV, Rigg is put through four trials in which he is forced to understand Jigsaw's modus operandi. He suffers a gunshot wound to the stomach in his final test, and it is revealed in Saw V that he died of blood loss. In Saw V, a police memorial service is held honoring those who died in their effort to close the Jigsaw case; Rigg is among the officers honored.

=== Eric Matthews ===
- Portrayed by Donnie Wahlberg
- Appears in: Saw II, Saw III, Saw IV, Saw V
- Status: Deceased
- Died in: Saw IV

Eric Matthews is a corrupt and aggressive police detective, divorced from his wife and estranged from his son Daniel, who leads a SWAT team to John Kramer's lair in Saw II. It is also implied he had an affair with Detective Allison Kerry, which led to his divorce. When the police raid the lair, John reveals that he has captured Daniel, but promises that Eric will be able to find him in a "safe and secure state" after talking with Jigsaw for two hours. Eric has been chosen for the game due to his history of police brutality and planting evidence to convict people of crimes they did not commit. Eric soon loses patience and assaults John, forcing him to take him to the nerve gas house. When he enters the bathroom from Saw, Amanda Young incapacitates him, chains him to a pipe, and leaves him to die.

In Saw III, Eric escapes the bathroom by breaking his foot and ankle. He pursues and beats Amanda before she gains the upper hand and leaves him for dead. He is later dragged to a cell by a hooded figure, given a brace for his shattered foot, and imprisoned until the time comes for Daniel Rigg's tests in Saw IV. Rigg fails his final test, causing two large ice blocks to swing down from the ceiling and crush Eric's head. In Saw V, a police memorial service is held honoring those who died in their effort to close the Jigsaw case; Eric is among the officers honored.

=== Gus Colyard ===
- Portrayed by Tony Nappo
- Appears in: Saw II, Saw III, Saw IV, Saw V
- Status: Deceased
- Died in: Saw II

Gus Colyard, a businessman, is a victim of the nerve gas house. He and Xavier Chavez attempt to use a key on a booby-trapped door, ignoring a written warning not to do so. Gus is killed instantly when a revolver behind the door discharges through the peephole, shooting him in the head. Like the other victims, Gus was in the house because he was framed for crimes he did not commit by Detective Eric Matthews. Gus later appears in a flashback in Saw IV, in which he quarrels with Cecil Adams in Jill Tuck's health clinic. In a flashback in Saw V, Gus is seen lying unconscious while John Kramer and Mark Hoffman set up the nerve gas house. It is shown in Saw V that his surname is Colyard, as indicated by a document observed by Agent Peter Strahm.

=== Jonas Singer ===
- Portrayed by Glenn Plummer
- Appears in: Saw II, Saw III, Saw V
- Status: Deceased
- Died in: Saw II

Jonas Singer appears in Saw II as a victim of the nerve gas house. Like the other captives, Jonas had previously been framed and jailed by Detective Eric Matthews, and it is implied that he is gang affiliated. Jonas attempts to work with the others to find an antidote, and is eventually killed by Xavier Chavez with a spiked baseball bat. It is shown in Saw V that his family name is Singer, as indicated by a document observed by Agent Peter Strahm. Jonas briefly appears in Saw V, in which he is seen lying unconscious on the floor, while John Kramer and Mark Hoffman set up the nerve gas house.

=== Laura Hunter ===
- Portrayed by Beverley Mitchell
- Appears in: Saw II, Saw III, Saw V
- Status: Deceased
- Died in: Saw II

Laura Hunter appears in Saw II as a prisoner of the nerve gas house alongside seven other victims, all but one of whom were framed for crimes they did not commit by Detective Eric Matthews. A flashback reveals that Obi Tate had kidnapped her for Jigsaw. Laura works with the others to find an antidote, but succumbs to the nerve agent shortly after discovering that another victim, Daniel, is Eric's son. Laura briefly appears in Saw V lying unconscious, while John Kramer and Mark Hoffman set up the nerve gas house. It is shown in Saw V that her surname is Hunter, as indicated by a document observed by Agent Peter Strahm.

=== Michael Marks ===
- Portrayed by Noam Jenkins
- Appears in: Saw II, Saw III, Saw IV, Saw V (mentioned only), Saw 3D
- Status: Deceased
- Died in: Saw II

In Saw II, Michael Marks is a police informant working for Detective Eric Matthews. He awakes with a spike-filled mask (called a "Venus flytrap" by Jigsaw) locked around his neck. A videotape and a set of x-ray slides reveal that the key has been surgically implanted behind his right eye, and in order to retrieve it he must remove his eye with a scalpel. He cannot bring himself to do it, and when the timer expires, the mask closes on his head, killing him instantly.

Michael is seen again in a flashback in Saw IV, in the waiting room of Jill Tuck's clinic. It is shown in Saw V that his surname is Marks, as indicated by a document observed by Agent Peter Strahm.

Michael makes an appearance in Saw 3D, where it is revealed in a flashback sequence that Dr. Lawrence Gordon surgically placed the key behind his eye for the purposes of his test in Saw II.

=== Obi ===
- Portrayed by Timothy Burd (film) and Marc Carr (game)
- Appears in: Saw II, Saw III, Saw V, Saw 3D, Saw: The Video Game, Saw II: Flesh & Blood (mentioned only), Spiral (photographs)
- Status: Deceased
- Died in: Saw II

Obi is an arsonist, and a victim of the nerve gas house. He remains isolated from the rest of the group until they come across a trap intended for him. A tape recorder reveals that Obi aided Jigsaw in kidnapping the other victims, and Obi is instructed to retrieve two antidote syringes from a furnace, keeping one for himself and giving the other away. When he attempts to retrieve the syringes, he inadvertently triggers a trap that seals and ignites the furnace, burning him alive. A clue given on Obi's tape indicates that he can save himself by closing a valve with a picture of a devil next to it, but will burn himself in the process.

In a flashback in Saw V, his unconscious body is shown being dragged into the nerve gas house by Mark Hoffman. His mugshot appears on the precinct wall in Spiral. Obi appears in Saw: The Video Game where he is rescued from another furnace by David Tapp. In Saw: The Video Game it is revealed that Obi desires to be tested by Jigsaw repeatedly, thinking of it as a "gift".

=== Pete ===
- Portrayed by Kelly Jones
- Appears in: Saw II, Saw III, Saw IV
- Status: Alive

In Saw II, SWAT member Pete is with the SWAT team during the raid on Wilson Steel. As he and two other officers climb a caged staircase, one stair shoots forward and breaks his shins. The impact causes him to fall backward and into the other two officers, who are fatally electrocuted when they fall against the now-electrified cage. After the raid on Wilson Steel, Pete recovers from his injuries and returns in Saw III at the scene of a Jigsaw trap. Pete is then seen in Saw IV, at the scene of Alison Kerry's death.

=== Xavier ===
- Portrayed by Franky G
- Appears in: Saw II, Saw III, Saw V, Saw 3D
- Status: Deceased
- Died in: Saw II

Xavier is a drug dealer and a victim of the nerve gas house. Like the other victims, Xavier had served time in prison after being framed by Detective Eric Matthews. Xavier is instructed to search for antidote syringes hidden around the house. The group finds a test intended for him, in which a key is hidden in a pit of hypodermic syringes, but he throws Amanda Young into the pit instead. He fails to unlock a door containing the antidote in time, and frustrated by their lack of success, abandons the others. Recalling hints left by Jigsaw on a tape recorder, Xavier realizes that each victim has a number written on the back of their neck that, when combined, will open a safe containing the antidote. Xavier begins hunting down the other victims to collect their numbers before realizing that one of the victims, Daniel, is Eric's son. He corners Daniel and Amanda in the bathroom from Saw, where, after discovering that the mirror is unusable, he cuts the skin out of the back of his neck to see his number. He then charges at Daniel and Amanda, but Daniel slashes Xavier's throat with the same hacksaw that Lawrence Gordon had used to saw off his foot in the previous film. Xavier's corpse appears in Saw III and Saw 3D. In Saw V, he is seen lying unconscious while John Kramer and Mark Hoffman set up the nerve gas house.

== Saw III ==
=== Corbett Denlon ===
- Portrayed by Niamh Wilson
- Appears in: Saw III, Saw IV, Saw V, Saw VI
- Status: Alive

Corbett Denlon is the neglected daughter of Jeff and Lynn Denlon. She is kidnapped and hidden in Jigsaw's warehouse, given a limited air supply. Jeff learns of her kidnapping upon killing Jigsaw, who reveals that to get Corbett back, he would have to play another game. However, that game never materializes since he is shot dead by Agent Peter Strahm in Saw IV, shortly after learning about Corbett's kidnapping. During Saw IV, Mark Hoffman is seen holding one of Corbett's stuffed animals when he talks to Agent Lindsey Perez. Corbett has a brief appearance in Saw V where she is seen with the stuffed animal being carried out of the warehouse and given to a police officer by Hoffman. After the end credits on the Director's Cut DVD of Saw VI, Amanda Young is seen talking to Corbett through the door of the room she's captive in, urging her not to trust Hoffman when he saves her.

=== Danica Scott ===
- Portrayed by Debra McCabe
- Appears in: Saw III, Saw V (mentioned only)
- Status: Deceased
- Died in: Saw III

Danica was the only witness to the collision that left Jeff Denlon's son Dylan dead. Instead of staying to testify, Danica fled the scene, and is later kidnapped as part of Jeff's tests. She is stripped nude and suspended by her wrists in a freezer room. Once Jeff enters, two metal poles start spraying Danica with water at random intervals. She manages to convince Jeff to help her, but she is frozen to death before he can retrieve the key from behind frozen metal bars.

=== Dylan Denlon ===
- Portrayed by Stefan Georgiou
- Appears in: Saw III, Saw IV
- Status: Deceased
- Died in: Saw III

Dylan Denlon is Jeff and Lynn Denlon's deceased son. He was killed when he was knocked off of his bicycle by a drunk driver, Timothy Young. Since Timothy received a very light sentence for causing Dylan's death, Jeff became vengeful, which is why he is tested in Saw III. Jeff is even forced to destroy all of Dylan's possessions (which he had kept in Dylan's room) in order to obtain a key for one of the traps. Jeff ultimately forgives Timothy (who is revealed in a flashback to have been genuinely remorseful) for causing the death of his son, having previously forgiven Danica, a witness who fled the scene and later did not come forward, as well as Judge Halden, who had sentenced Timothy.

=== Judge Halden ===
- Portrayed by Barry Flatman
- Appears in: Saw III, Saw V (mentioned only)
- Status: Deceased
- Died in: Saw III

Halden is a judge who presided over the case of Timothy Young, the drunk driver who killed Jeff Denlon's son Dylan. Halden is captured and positioned as part of Jeff's test of forgiveness to see if Jeff could overcome his anger at Halden for sentencing Timothy to only six months in prison. He is chained at the neck to the bottom of a large vat that is slowly filled with liquified pig corpses. The key to free him is in an incinerator filled with Dylan's belongings. Halden pleads with Jeff, urging him not to become a killer, and eventually, after revealing to Jeff that he has a son of his own, Jeff, after trying and failing to open the door of the incinerator, reluctantly burns the items to retrieve the key, and frees Halden in time. Later, while confronting Timothy, Halden once again pleads with Jeff to do something; at one point, the judge attempts to stop the machine to which Timothy is strapped (which Jigsaw calls "the Rack") using brute force. Jeff eventually forgives Timothy, and tries to help him, but when retrieving the key, he triggers a shotgun that discharges into Halden's face, killing him instantly.

=== Jeff Denlon ===
- Portrayed by Angus Macfadyen
- Appears in: Saw III, Saw IV, Saw V, Saw VI, Saw 3D (mentioned only)
- Status: Deceased
- Died in: Saw IV

Jeff Denlon is one of John Kramer's victims in Saw III. Jeff was consumed by vengeance after the death of his son, Dylan, who was knocked off his bike and killed by a drunk driver, Timothy. Three years after his son's death, Jeff is kidnapped and subjected to a series of encounters with those he held accountable for the incident: Danica Scott (a witness who fled the scene and later did not come forward to testify), Judge Halden (the judge who passed a very lenient sentence on Timothy) and ultimately Timothy himself (who is revealed in a flashback to have been genuinely remorseful for killing Dylan). Jeff is faced with the choice of saving them or allowing them to die in their traps; Judge Halden pleads with Jeff not to become a killer himself. In Jeff's final test, he confronts Jigsaw himself to prove he has learned how to forgive. Jeff tells John he forgives him before slicing his throat with a circular saw. Upon doing so, Jeff inadvertently triggers a device that kills his wife, Lynn. Just before he dies, John takes out a tape recorder; the tape reveals that, by killing John, Jeff failed his final test, and must play another game to save his daughter Corbett.

In Saw IV, Jeff is killed by Agent Peter Strahm, who appears while he tries to rescue Eric Matthews. Strahm fatally shoots Jeff in self-defence after Jeff points the gun at him, demanding to know where his daughter is.

=== Jill Tuck ===
- Portrayed by Betsy Russell
- Appears in: Saw: Rebirth, Saw III, Saw IV, Saw V, Saw VI, Saw 3D, Jigsaw (mentioned only), Saw II: Flesh & Blood (mentioned only)
- Status: Deceased
- Died in: Saw 3D

Jill Tuck, the ex-wife of John Kramer, appears briefly in Saw III as part of a memory that John recalls while he is undergoing brain surgery. She is interrogated by FBI agents Peter Strahm and Lindsey Perez in Saw IV, revealing Jigsaw's backstory. In Saw V, after John's death, Jill visits his lawyer to hear his will, during which she is bequeathed a box containing his last intended test subjects, including one test that Jill must carry out herself. Submitting to John's final wishes, in Saw VI Jill places Mark Hoffman in a reverse bear trap, intending to kill him.

After Hoffman escapes the trap, in Saw 3D Jill flees to his precinct station and asks for help from Detective Matt Gibson in Internal Affairs, offering to incriminate Hoffman in exchange for immunity and protection. While Jill is in protective custody, Hoffman infiltrates the police station and kills her with the reverse bear trap previously used on Amanda Young. As Hoffman destroys his workshop, a news report on the radio is overheard reporting that Jill has been found dead. Jill's death is subsequently avenged by Dr. Lawrence Gordon, who was instructed in a tape left for him by John to watch over Jill, and to act immediately on John's behalf if anything happened to her.

Jill is briefly mentioned in Jigsaw, when it is revealed that the main game is taking place at a pig farm that had been owned by her family, until it had to close due to an outbreak of Aujeszky's disease.

=== Lynn Denlon ===
- Portrayed by Bahar Soomekh
- Appears in: Saw III, Saw IV, Saw V, Saw VI, Saw 3D
- Status: Deceased
- Died in: Saw III

Lynn Denlon is an ER doctor who is kidnapped in Saw III by Amanda Young and tasked with keeping John Kramer alive until another victim completes his test. Amanda locks a collar around Lynn's neck; if John dies or she moves too far out of range, the collar will fire five shotgun shells at her head. Lynn looks after John and performs an improvised brain surgery to relieve pressure on his brain, while her husband Jeff Denlon faces a series of tests. Amanda refuses to free Lynn after Jeff completes his test, jealous of the attention John showed her and not believing she had learned anything. Amanda, unaware that Lynn is married to Jeff, shoots her. Jeff enters the room after Lynn is shot and retaliates by shooting Amanda; he then slashes John's throat with a circular saw, unwittingly activating Lynn's collar; she is killed instantly by the exploding shotgun shells after John dies from his injury. Her corpse is seen in Saw IV and Saw V. It is revealed in Saw VI that Mark Hoffman blackmailed Amanda into killing Lynn. In Saw 3D, it is revealed that it was Dr. Lawrence Gordon who suggested that she perform John's surgery.

Angelo Delos Trinos of Screen Rant described Lynn as one of the characters in the franchise who did not deserve her fate—being paired with Joyce Dagen—and described as a woman "being dragged down by your husband's failure as a person". In an overview of over 80 traps in the franchise with the release of Spiral, Lynn's shotgun collar was ranked 20th.1

=== Mark Hoffman ===
- Portrayed by Costas Mandylor
- Appears in: Saw III, Saw IV, Saw V, Saw VI, Saw 3D, Saw X, Saw: The Video Game (mentioned only), Saw II: Flesh & Blood (mentioned only)
- Status: Unknown, possibly deceased

Mark Hoffman is briefly introduced in Saw III as a detective investigating the scene of Troy's inescapable trap. In Saw IV, he is placed in a trap as a part of Officer Daniel Rigg's test. However, he is later revealed to be John Kramer's accomplice after he frees himself and leaves Rigg to die. Saw V reveals that Hoffman's sister was murdered by her abusive boyfriend Seth Baxter, and that after Seth was released early from prison, Hoffman took revenge by placing him in an inescapable trap made to look like one of John's; Seth was killed despite doing as he was instructed. John found out about the trap and, in addition to criticising Hoffman's trap as being inferior, blackmailed Hoffman into working for him, but Hoffman eventually became a willing apprentice and aided him in nearly every subsequent trap, despite not genuinely believing in Jigsaw's philosophy (even remarking about how much he wanted Timothy Young to suffer when reprimanded by John for failing to treat Timothy as a human being).

When Agent Peter Strahm closes in on him, Hoffman kills and frames him. In Saw VI, he kills two FBI agents and a technician who threaten to expose his secret. Jill Tuck attempts to kill him with an updated reverse bear trap, as per John's request, although he manages to escape wounded. In Saw 3D, he sneaks into the police station, kills everyone standing between him and Jill, then kills her with the original reverse bear trap John had used on Amanda Young. After killing Jill, Hoffman; who is now wanted by the authorities for the murders of Jill and several police employees, destroys his warehouse and attempts to leave town. However, before he can leave, he is abducted by Dr. Lawrence Gordon and left to die in the bathroom from Saw, thus avenging Jill's murder; Dr. Gordon throws the saw that he used to saw off his foot out of the bathroom, leaving Hoffman with no means to escape.

According to producers Oren Koules and Mark Burg, Hoffman is named after late Saw producer Gregg Hoffman, who died shortly after the announcement of Saw III.

=== Timothy Young ===
- Portrayed by Mpho Koaho
- Appears in: Saw III, Saw V (mentioned only), Saw VI
- Status: Deceased
- Died in: Saw III

Timothy Young is a medical student who knocked Jeff Denlon's son, Dylan, off of his bicycle and killed him while driving drunk three years prior to the events of Saw III. Timothy was sentenced to only six months in prison, and was released long before the events of the film, fueling Jeff's thirst for vengeance. A flashback reveals that Timothy was genuinely remorseful for causing Dylan's death.

In Saw III, Timothy is kidnapped and placed in a device called "The Rack", which begins to rotate, twisting and breaking each of his limbs one-by-one. Jeff, despite Judge Halden (who had sentenced Timothy for causing Dylan's death) pleading with him to do something (and even trying to stop the device using brute force), is initially content with watching Timothy die, but ultimately forgives him and decides to help him. However, Jeff is too late and the device twists Timothy's head, fatally breaking his neck before Jeff can unlock the device. Judge Halden is also killed in the course of Jeff's failed attempt to save Timothy, after Jeff discharges a loaded shotgun into Halden's face while retrieving a key that has been tied to the trigger. Timothy appears in a flashback in Saw VI, lying unconscious before being placed in The Rack by Hoffman, who is reprimanded by Jigsaw for not treating Timothy as a fellow human being.

=== Troy ===
- Portrayed by J. Larose
- Appears in: Saw III, Saw IV
- Status: Deceased
- Died in: Saw III

Troy is one of Amanda Young's first victims, chosen because of his long prison record for unnamed crimes despite having a privileged upbringing. Troy is imprisoned in a classroom, where he is tasked with tearing eleven chains from his flesh before a bomb detonates, but he is unable to remove the final chain in his mandible in time. It is later revealed that Troy's only exit from the trap had been welded shut, leaving him no means of escape even if he had removed all the chains. Troy is later seen in a flashback in Saw IV, in the waiting room of Jill Tuck's clinic.

== Saw IV ==
=== Dr. Heffner ===
- Portrayed by James Van Patten
- Appears in: Saw IV, Saw VI, Saw 3D
- Status: Deceased
- Died in: Saw 3D

Dr. Heffner is the medical examiner who performs John Kramer's autopsy in the beginning of Saw IV. He appears briefly in Saw VI, where he tells Detective Mark Hoffman and Agents Lindsey Perez and Dan Erickson that he performed the autopsies on all of Jigsaw's victims, and that a different knife was used to cut the jigsaw piece from the remains of Seth Baxter and later Eddie. In Saw 3D, he is murdered by Hoffman, who hides in a body bag in order to gain access to the morgue.

=== Art Blank ===
- Portrayed by Justin Louis
- Appears in: Saw IV, Saw V, Saw 3D, Saw II: Flesh & Blood (mentioned only)
- Status: Deceased
- Died in: Saw IV

Art is a lawyer who was involved in a housing development project with John Kramer and Jill Tuck, before John's transformation into the Jigsaw Killer. Art is targeted by John for successfully defending guilty people, including Brenda (a pimp), Ivan Landsness (a rapist), and Rex (an abusive husband). Art first appears in a trap that pits him against another victim, Trevor. Both are chained at the neck to a winch and Art's mouth is sewn shut, as are Trevor's eyes, rendering communication impossible. Trevor panics and attempts to kill Art, and Art is forced to kill Trevor in order to retrieve the key attached to his collar, tearing his mouth open in the process. Art later has a hand in setting up the tests for Daniel Rigg. He is tasked with keeping Eric Matthews and Mark Hoffman alive throughout the 90 minutes of Rigg's tests, wearing a device strapped to his back with a set of pincers poised to cut through his spine. Once the timer runs out, he is to press a button that will free him and both captives. However, Rigg crashes through the door with one second to spare, causing Eric's death, and then shoots Art in the head after mistaking the tape recorder in his hand for a gun. Art is seen in archival footage in Saw V, and is seen in a photograph with John outside the Gideon Meatpacking Plant in the police station's evidence room in Saw 3D.

=== Brenda ===
- Portrayed by Sarain Boylan
- Appears in: Saw IV
- Status: Deceased
- Died in: Saw IV

Brenda is a pimp who appears in Saw IV as a victim in Daniel Rigg's game. Art Blank had acted as her lawyer in previous criminal trials and got her acquitted. Brenda is placed in a machine designed to tear her scalp from her head and Rigg is instructed to simply walk away from her as she is not worth saving. After he dials the lock combination written on the gears to release her, she attacks him with a knife that had been hidden in the room. She had been told by Jigsaw that Rigg was there to arrest her and the only way to prevent Rigg from sending her to prison for her crimes was to kill him. Rigg subdues her by throwing her into a mirror, and she dies of blood loss before the police and FBI find her.

=== Cecil Adams ===
- Portrayed by Billy Otis
- Appears in: Saw IV, Saw V (mentioned only), Saw VI, Saw II: Flesh & Blood (mentioned only)
- Status: Deceased
- Died in: Saw IV

Cecil Adams is a drug addict who played a large role in John Kramer's transformation into the Jigsaw Killer. As Jill Tuck was closing down her drug rehabilitation clinic for the night, he begged her to let him back in; once inside, he robbed the facility and shoved a door into her stomach while fleeing, inadvertently causing her to have a miscarriage. John later abducts Cecil and places him in the first Jigsaw trap: a chair with razor blade restraints, from which he can only escape by pushing his face through a set of knives. The chair collapses and Cecil charges at John, who steps aside, allowing Cecil to fall into a tangle of razor wire, killing him. John subsequently cuts the shape of a puzzle piece from Cecil's remains. In Saw VI, it is shown that Cecil robbed Jill's clinic at Amanda Young's request.

=== Detective Fisk ===
- Portrayed by Mike Realba
- Appears in: Saw IV, Saw V
- Status: Alive

Fisk is a detective who first appears in Saw IV working with Agents Peter Strahm and Lindsey Perez. In Saw IV, he discovers Daniel Rigg's fingerprints at the scene of Allison Kerry's death on a bullet casing lodged between her body and the trap. In Saw V, he is present at the Gideon Meatpacking Plant when the FBI rescues Mark Hoffman and Corbett Denlon. Fisk is also seen in flashbacks with Hoffman at the scene of Seth Baxter's death and is later told by Hoffman to keep him in the loop about the Jigsaw murders.

=== Ivan ===
- Portrayed by Marty Adams
- Appears in: Saw IV
- Status: Deceased
- Died in: Saw IV

Ivan appears in Saw IV as the clerk of the Alexander Motel. Suspected of multiple vicious rapes but freed repeatedly due to the efforts of his lawyer Art Blank, Ivan is part of Daniel Rigg's second test. Following instructions, Rigg forces him into an adjoining motel room, where they are both confronted with video and photographic evidence of Ivan's exploits. Enraged, Rigg forces Ivan into a prearranged trap, for which he is strapped spreadeagle to a bed and his head is secured in a vise, and supplies him with the tools to escape: two buttons that will drive blades into his eyes. Ivan only blinds one eye before the 60-second timer runs out, and the trap rips off three of his limbs and throws his body across the room.

=== Lindsey Perez ===
- Portrayed by Athena Karkanis
- Appears in: Saw IV, Saw V, Saw VI
- Status: Deceased
- Died in: Saw VI

Lindsey Perez is an FBI agent assigned to the Jigsaw case along with her partner, Agent Peter Strahm. Informed by Detective Allison Kerry that two officers might be in danger, she and Strahm investigate the disappearances of Daniel Rigg and Mark Hoffman. As they follow the trail of Rigg's tests, it becomes apparent that they themselves are being targeted by Jigsaw. Perez barely escapes death when Strahm pulls her out of the firing path of a harpoon (which in turn hit a crime scene photographer). Minutes later, they enter a room where they are confronted with a Billy doll and a tape meant for Perez. As she leans in to hear the tape, the Billy doll's face explodes sending shrapnel into her face and neck. In Saw V, it is implied that Perez died from her injuries; her last words to Strahm were "Detective Hoffman", leading to Strahm's initial suspicion regarding Hoffman.

Perez is revealed to be alive in Saw VI, with prominent facial scars, and is back on the Jigsaw case. Dismissive of Strahm being Jigsaw's accomplice, she and Agent Dan Erickson investigate abnormalities in each crime scene that implicates Strahm, including a distorted tape made by Hoffman. As soon as the tape is unscrambled Hoffman fatally stabs her. When Hoffman demands to know who else is aware of his secret, she says "everyone" before dying. After killing Perez, Hoffman sets fire to her body and everything else in the audio lab to destroy the evidence.

=== Morgan and Rex ===
- Portrayed by Janet Land and Ron Lea
- Appear in: Saw IV
- Status: Morgan alive; Rex deceased
- Died in: Saw IV (Rex only)

Morgan and Rex are a married couple. Officer Daniel Rigg suspected Rex of abusing his wife and their daughter Jane but was unable to arrest him as Morgan and Jane refused to testify against him. In frustration, Rigg punched Rex, prompting his lawyer Art Blank to threaten him with a lawsuit. Detective Mark Hoffman interceded, claiming Rigg was acting in self-defense and the matter was dropped. Rex and Morgan are later put into a Jigsaw test as part of Rigg's game. The pair are locked back-to-back in a harness, their bodies impaled with several long spikes. A tape left for Morgan informs her that she can free herself by removing the spikes but will kill Rex in the process. When Rigg finds the pair, Rex is dead and Morgan is unconscious, having removed all but one spike. He gives her the key to the harness and tells her she will have to save herself, then sets off a fire alarm to alert the authorities to her location. When found by Agents Peter Strahm and Lindsey Perez, Morgan says that Rigg has saved her.

=== Peter Strahm ===
Scott Patterson as FBI agent Peter Strahm

- Portrayed by Scott Patterson
- Appears in: Saw IV, Saw V, Saw VI
- Status: Deceased
- Died in: Saw V

Peter Strahm is an FBI agent assigned to the Jigsaw case. He and his partner, Agent Lindsey Perez, arrive at the scene of Allison Kerry's death shortly after the police find her body. He is the first to theorize that Jigsaw may have had more than one accomplice. He interrogates Jill Tuck gaining information on Jigsaw's background, while pursuing Daniel Rigg. His investigation leads him to the Gideon Meatpacking Plant, where he discovers the corpses of Jigsaw, Amanda Young, and Lynn Denlon, in the makeshift sickroom. Strahm kills Jeff Denlon in self-defense before Mark Hoffman locks him in. Early in Saw V, Strahm finds a hidden exit, but is captured and placed in a trap (a glass cube around his head that fills with water) meant to kill him. He survives by removing a pen from his shirt pocket and using the plastic tube to perform a makeshift tracheotomy on himself. Subsequently, his boss, Agent Dan Erickson, removes him from the case. Strahm conducts his own investigation, now suspicious of Hoffman. He is eventually crushed to death in a trap room when he fails to follow Hoffman's instructions, and Hoffman plants his cell phone at a crime scene to frame him as Jigsaw's second accomplice.

In Saw VI, Hoffman emerges from the casket below the trap and uses Strahm's severed hand to place his fingerprints at additional crime scenes. As soon as Agents Perez and Erickson unravel the deception, Hoffman murders them and again leaves Strahm's fingerprints at the scene before setting it on fire.

=== Tracy Rigg ===
- Portrayed by Ingrid Hart
- Appears in: Saw IV
- Status: Alive

Tracy Rigg, the wife of Daniel Rigg, is often home alone because he spends so much time at his job. He arrives home just as she is about to leave for a few days and stay with her mother; she tries to persuade him to come with her, but he declines. Before leaving, she tells him that he cannot save everyone.

=== Trevor ===
- Portrayed by Kevin Rushton
- Appears in: Saw IV, Saw 3D
- Status: Deceased
- Died in: Saw IV

Trevor appears in Saw IV as a victim placed in a trap with Art Blank. Both are chained at the neck to a winch; the key is attached to Trevor's collar, however, Trevor's eyes are sewn shut, as well as Art's mouth, rendering communication impossible. In a panic, Trevor blindly stabs Art in the leg with a hook, and Art kills him to retrieve the key. In Saw 3D, it is revealed that Dr. Lawrence Gordon had sewn Trevor's eyes shut.

== Saw V ==
=== Angelina ===
- Portrayed by Sarah Power
- Appears in: Saw V, Saw VI (mentioned only), Saw 3D, Saw II: Flesh & Blood (mentioned only)
- Status: Deceased
- Died in: Saw V

Angelina, the younger sister of Detective Mark Hoffman, was murdered by her boyfriend Seth Baxter. He received a life sentence, but was released from prison on a technicality after only five years. Hoffman gets revenge on Seth by kidnapping him and placing him in an inescapable trap that is made to resemble a Jigsaw trap. Seth is sliced in two with a pendulum blade, despite following the instructions that he is given. John Kramer, who disapproves of killing his victims outright, learns of the trap and uses this knowledge to coerce Hoffman into becoming his apprentice.

=== Ashley ===
- Portrayed by Laura Gordon
- Appears in: Saw V, Saw VI (mentioned only)
- Status: Deceased
- Died in: Saw V

Ashley is one of the five victims placed in the main game in Saw V. In the first room, the victims have collars locked around their necks connected to cables that will pull them back toward a set of blades positioned to decapitate them. The keys to the collars are at the other end of the room, and they have 60 seconds to free themselves before the collars retract. All but Ashley free themselves in time. She is a former fire inspector who lost her job after writing a report to cover up an arson fire in which eight people died.

=== Brit ===
- Portrayed by Julie Benz
- Appears in: Saw V, Saw VI (mentioned only)
- Status: Alive

Brit is the vice president of a real estate company, and is placed in a series of four traps along with four other people. The five victims believe that one person will have to die in each room in order for the others to move ahead; Brit fatally stabs Luba Gibbs through the neck with an electrode in the third room. However, in the final room, she realizes that the group could have worked together so that everyone would have survived. She and Mallick Scott, the only other person to reach this point, also learn that the members of the group are connected through a building fire that killed eight people, which Brit had orchestrated. Brit and Mallick are forced to saw their arms in order to obtain enough blood to open the exit door. As she crawls from the room, Agent Dan Erickson finds her and calls for medical assistance.

=== Charles ===
- Portrayed by Carlo Rota
- Appears in: Saw V, Saw VI (mentioned only)
- Status: Deceased
- Died in: Saw V

Charles, a journalist, is a victim in the main game of Saw V alongside four other people. He is shown to be intelligent and to possess knowledge about the other victims and their mutual involvement in an arson scam. He attacks Mallick Scott in the second room to obtain a key to a bomb shelter, but is attacked by Luba Gibbs with a metal bar and left to die as the other three victims move to safety from the explosive devices in the room. Charles realizes too late that the bomb shelters are large enough to fit more than one person, and is killed in the explosion. Charles had been writing a report about the arson of a building that burned down, but buried the story.

=== Dan Erickson ===
- Portrayed by Mark Rolston
- Appears in: Saw V, Saw VI
- Status: Deceased
- Died in: Saw VI

Dan Erickson is an FBI agent in charge of the Jigsaw case, with Agents Peter Strahm and Lindsey Perez working under him. He relieves Strahm of duty following his narrow escape from a Jigsaw trap, and becomes increasingly wary of him as Strahm becomes obsessed with Jigsaw. When Erickson is informed by Detective Mark Hoffman that Strahm believes there to be another Jigsaw accomplice, he places a trace on Strahm's mobile phone to locate him. He finds the phone and his own FBI personnel file (both planted by Hoffman) at the scene of a Jigsaw game, and puts out an all-points bulletin for Strahm's arrest.

In Saw VI, Erickson and Perez, whose death was faked for her protection, resume the investigation and probe Strahm's apparent link to John Kramer. As they uncover evidence that indicates Strahm was framed, their suspicion of Hoffman grows. Once their audio lab technician removes the distortion from the Seth Baxter tape, revealing Hoffman as John's accomplice, Hoffman slashes Erickson's jugular vein and stabs Perez to death. Erickson is still alive as Hoffman pours gasoline over him and sets the lab on fire to destroy the evidence.

=== Luba Gibbs ===
- Portrayed by Meagan Good
- Appears in: Saw V, Saw VI (mentioned only)
- Status: Deceased
- Died in: Saw V

Luba Gibbs, a city planner, is a victim in the main game of Saw V, alongside four other people. After surviving the first room, Luba assaults Charles Salomon after he attacks Mallick Scott, leaving Charles to die when explosive devices in the second room detonate. In the third room, Brit Stevenson fatally stabs Luba in the neck, stating that she does not trust her, and she and Mallick use the corpse as an electrical conductor to open the door to the final room.

It is revealed that Luba played a role in an arson scam that killed eight people, an event that links all the victims of the game. She had accepted bribes from a sports team owned by her father, Richard Gibbs, to allow a stadium to be built on the site of a building Mallick burned down.

=== Mallick ===
- Portrayed by Greg Bryk
- Appears in: Saw V, Saw VI (mentioned only), Saw 3D
- Status: Alive

Mallick, an arsonist and heroin addict, is one of the five victims in the main game in Saw V. Suspicious of the other victims, Mallick manages to survive the first trap, and is saved by Luba Gibbs in the second test at the expense of Charles Salomon's life, but Luba turns on him in the third trap. Mallick is rescued by Brit Stevenson who murders Luba, and the pair use Luba's body to close the circuits and open the door to the final room. In the final test, Mallick begins to understand his connection to the other victims that is through an incident, orchestrated by Brit, in which he burned down a supposedly abandoned building, killing eight people and leaving him guilt-ridden. Mallick and Brit, realizing that the victims were meant to work together to win, are forced to provide 10 pints of blood to open the exit door. Mallick passes out from blood loss as Brit crawls out of the room, and both he and Brit are taken to safety by Agent Dan Erickson.

In Saw 3D, Mallick appears in the Saw trap survivors support group being visited by Bobby Dagen, who is filming a documentary. Mallick is shown wearing a cast on his injured arm.

=== Pamela Jenkins ===
- Portrayed by Samantha Lemole
- Appears in: Saw V, Saw VI, Saw 3D (mentioned only), Saw: The Video Game (mentioned only)
- Status: Alive

Pamela Jenkins is a reporter following the Jigsaw killings who first appears in Saw V, attending a press conference being held by Detective Mark Hoffman. In Saw VI, she begins pursuing Jill Tuck for information about Jigsaw, presenting her with a letter found at an earlier Jigsaw crime scene, later revealed to be that given by Hoffman to Amanda Young. Pamela is kidnapped and placed in a cell opposite Tara and Brent Abbott's, with a message telling her that she is there as punishment for sensationalizing Jigsaw's story and twisting his message for her own gain, and will be forced to "experience the meaning of sacrifice" and "see the consequence for those who unjustly hurt others". At the end of William Easton's game, he is confronted by Pamela, who is revealed to be his sister, and Tara and Brent are revealed to be the family of a man whose medical insurance had been denied by William, in part leading to his death. Brent activates a device that kills William as Pamela watches.

Pamela also appears in Saw: The Video Game, providing information to another journalist, Oswald McGillicutty, who plans to write a book and not credit Pamela. Knowing this, Pamela steals all his notes, preventing him from writing the book, in order to write a book of her own. Despite her relationship to William Easton, the game and films show her last name as Jenkins.

=== Seth Baxter ===
- Portrayed by Joris Jarsky
- Appears in: Saw V, Saw VI, Saw II: Flesh & Blood (mentioned only)
- Status: Deceased
- Died in: Saw V

Seth Baxter is the boyfriend and murderer of Mark Hoffman's younger sister Angelina Acomb. He was sentenced to life in prison for the murder, but was released on a technicality after serving only five years behind bars. Hoffman, enraged by the death of his only family member, kidnaps Seth and puts him in a trap that mimics Jigsaw's methods, but is rigged to be inescapable. Hoffman produces a video tape depicting Billy (the puppet used by Jigsaw to communicate with test subjects) and distorts his voice to make it sound like that of Jigsaw. Seth, who had fatally strangled Angelina, is told that he must put his hands into two presses and push buttons to crush them in order to avoid being killed by a swinging pendulum blade that gradually swings closer and closer to his body, and will cut him in two within sixty seconds. Even though he does so, the pendulum continues to descend and ultimately bisects him as Hoffman watches through a peephole. Jigsaw, who disapproves of outright killing his victims, later abducts Hoffman and, after criticising the pendulum trap as inferior to his work, blackmails Hoffman into becoming his apprentice.

In Saw VI, detectives reopen the investigation into Seth's death after Dr. Heffner reveals that the blade used to cut a puzzle piece from the remains of a recent victim of a Jigsaw trap was the same one used to cut a puzzle piece from Seth's remains. Agents Erickson and Perez, with assistance from a technician, subsequently analyse Seth's tape and discover Hoffman's voice, although all are immediately murdered by Hoffman.

== Saw VI ==
=== Addy and Allen ===
- Portrayed by Janelle Hutchison and Shawn Ahmed
- Appear in: Saw VI, Saw 3D (Addy; Allen mentioned only)
- Status: Addy alive; Allen deceased
- Died in: Saw VI (Allen only)

Addy and Allen, William Easton's secretary and file clerk, are victims forced to take part in his second game at the abandoned Rowan Zoological Institute. They are standing on retractable ledges with barbed wire nooses around their necks and their hands tied behind their backs, while William holds two chains connected to the ledges. In order to move on, he has to drop one chain and let that person die. He is presented with information that Addy is a diabetic and in poor health but has a family, while Allen is young and healthy, but is all alone. William is forced to choose whether to act by his company's policy or by his own morals, and the chains are gradually reeled in, making it harder for William to keep holding them; he finally chooses to save Addy, and Allen's noose cuts his throat and strangles him to death when his ledge retracts.

In Saw 3D, Addy is part of Bobby Dagen's support group.

=== Brent and Tara Abbott ===
- Portrayed by Devon Bostick and Shauna MacDonald
- Appear in: Saw VI, Saw 3D (Tara; Brent mentioned only)
- Status: Both alive

Brent and Tara Abbott are the teenage son and widow of a man named Harold Abbott whose health insurance policy was revoked by William Easton on a technicality, resulting in his eventual death. They are captured and placed in one of two cages at the abandoned Rowan Zoological Institute at the end of William's series of tests, with Pamela Jenkins in the other. Once William reaches the end, Tara and Brent are given the choice of sparing his life or ending it. Despite expressing anger for her husband's death, Tara listens to the pleas for mercy from both William and Pamela, and cannot bring herself to kill William. However, Brent cannot forgive him and triggers the device himself, causing a platform of needles to swing down into William's back and inject him with hydrofluoric acid. Pamela, Tara, and Brent watch in horror as he is dissolved from the inside out; Brent begins to cry when he realises what he has done.

In Saw 3D, Tara is part of Bobby Dagen's support group.

=== Carousel Room Victims ===
- Portrayed by James Gilbert (Aaron), Darius McCrary (Dave), Larissa Gomes (Emily), Melanie Scrofano (Gena), Shawn Mathieson (Josh), Karen Cliche (Shelby)
- Appear in: Saw VI, Saw 3D (Emily; Others mentioned only)
- Status: Emily and Shelby alive; Others deceased
- Died in: Saw VI (excluding Emily and Shelby)

Aaron, Dave, Emily, Gena, Josh, and Shelby are six of William's junior associates, whom he collectively refers to as "The Dog Pit" and who are tasked with investigating health insurance applications and claims in order to find a reason for denying most of them. They are placed at the abandoned Rowan Zoological Institute in the last of William's four tests, and are chained to a carousel facing a shotgun that is controlled by the gears of a bicycle. As the carousel rotates to bring each captive in line with the gun, William is given the chance to save two of them from being killed by pushing two buttons that will drive a spike through his hand and divert the gun upward. If he does nothing, all six will die. They plead for William to spare them and accuse each other of lying; William saves Emily and Shelby, and the other four are shot to death. First was Aaron, who claimed to be the strongest of them six, but was killed, second was Emily, pointing out her kids, giving Williams a reason to save her, next was Gena, who made a false claim about being pregnant, but was killed. Dave was next, who tried to bribe Wlliams, but was killed, Shelby was the fifth, who revealed that her mother was sick, which Williams chose to save her. Josh, whose fate was sealed, lashed out at Williams, making his feelings about his policies known, and demanded that he look at him when he dies, before being killed himself.

In Saw 3D, Emily is part of Bobby Dagen's support group.

=== Debbie ===
- Portrayed by Caroline Cave
- Appears in: Saw VI, Saw 3D (mentioned only)
- Status: Deceased
- Died in: Saw VI

Debbie is the attorney for Umbrella Health and William Easton. She is kidnapped, tied up and placed in William's third test at the abandoned Rowan Zoological Institute; a device is strapped to her chest that will shoot a spear through her head unless she reaches the end of a steel cage maze in 90 seconds. After Debbie unties herself, William has to help her by diverting jets of scalding steam away from her path and onto himself. After reaching the end of the maze, she discovers that the key to her device is sewn into William's side. She attacks him with a circular saw but is unable to retrieve the key before her time runs out and the device activates, killing her, and she falls to the bottom of the shaft.

=== Eddie ===
- Portrayed by Marty Moreau
- Appears in: Saw VI
- Status: Deceased
- Died in: Saw VI

Eddie is a predatory lending banker and a part of a game in Saw VI, along with his co-worker Simone, in which they are placed in adjoining cells. He wears a head harness with screws poised at the temples, and has a knife and a meat cleaver. A balance scale is placed between his and Simone's cell, and the one who can cut off more weight in flesh in 60 seconds will live, while the other will be killed by the screws boring into his or her skull. Eddie, who is overweight, slices several chunks of flesh from his stomach, but Simone severs her left arm and tips the scale in her favor, leading to Eddie's death.

When Dr. Adam Heffner carries out an autopsy on Eddie's corpse, he finds that the shape of a puzzle piece has been cut from the remains using the same blade that was used on the remains of Seth Baxter years earlier, resulting in the investigation into Seth's death being reopened.

=== Hank ===
- Portrayed by Gerry Mendicino
- Appears in: Saw VI, Saw 3D (mentioned only)
- Status: Deceased
- Died in: Saw VI

Hank is a janitor for Umbrella Health, working for William Easton. He is kidnapped and placed in the first of William's four tests, a vise-like trap that will crush either his or William's chest, leaving only one survivor. Jigsaw informs them that every breath they take will cause the vise to tighten and that Hank is a smoker, despite a history of health problems. Even though William encourages Hank to hold his breath he is unable to do so, and continues breathing heavily until the vise crushes him.

=== Harold Abbott ===
- Portrayed by George Newbern
- Appears in: Saw VI
- Status: Deceased
- Died in: Saw VI

Harold Abbott is the husband of Tara and father of Brent. Flashbacks throughout Saw VI reveal that his health insurance policy was revoked by William Easton due to a discrepancy found on his application, and he eventually died from heart disease. Tara and Brent are placed in a game in which they can choose to let William live or die. Brent kills William by activating a platform of needles that inject hydrofluoric acid into his body, as an act of revenge for William's role in Harold's death.

=== Simone ===
- Portrayed by Tanedra Howard
- Appears in: Saw VI, Saw 3D
- Status: Alive

Simone is a predatory lending banker, who is placed in a game with her co-worker Eddie. They are placed in adjoining cells. Since they have figuratively extracted "pounds of flesh" from loan recipients who they knew could never pay them back, they will literally have to do the same in order to survive. She wears a head harness with screws poised at the temples, and has a knife and a meat cleaver. A balance scale is placed between her and Eddie's cell; whichever one cuts off the most weight in flesh in sixty seconds will live, while the other will be killed by the screws boring into his or her skull. Eddie, being overweight, slices several chunks of flesh from his stomach, but Simone chops off her left arm and tips the scale in her favor, causing Eddie to be killed by the trap. Simone survives and is later questioned by Detective Mark Hoffman and the FBI in her hospital room. She angrily lashes out at Hoffman when he asks her if she learned anything from her experience.

Simone appears in Saw 3D, at Bobby Dagen's support group, still bitter from her experience and wearing a prosthetic arm.

=== William Easton ===
- Portrayed by Peter Outerbridge
- Appears in: Saw VI, Saw 3D
- Status: Deceased
- Died in: Saw VI

William Easton is an insurance executive at Umbrella Health who is tested in Saw VI. He helped fund Jill Tuck's rehab clinic; later, he informed John Kramer that his company would not cover the cost of an experimental treatment for John's cancer, based on a probability formula he invented, which his company uses to reject insurance coverage for people with fatal conditions. William is placed in the abandoned Rowan Zoological Institute and given 60 minutes to complete four tests, or else the explosives strapped to his limbs will detonate. The tests force him to make decisions about who will live or die and re-examine his policy. After completing his tests William is confronted by Tara and Brent Abbott, the widow and son of a man whose coverage had been cancelled by William, and subsequently died as a result. William learns that Tara and Brent have the choice to either let him live or kill him. He, along with his captured sister Pamela Jenkins, convince Tara to let him live, but Brent, refusing to forgive William for causing his father's death, activates a device that drives a bed of needles into William's back. A vat of hydrofluoric acid is pumped through the needles, dissolving his body in two and killing him. Brent quickly regrets his decision, and begins to cry upon realising what he has done.

William is mentioned in Saw 3D on a newscast stating that his remains were found along with the other victims from Saw VI.

== Saw 3D ==
=== Bobby Dagen ===
- Portrayed by Sean Patrick Flanery
- Appears in: Saw 3D
- Status: Unknown

Bobby Dagen is the author of a self-help book based on his accounts of surviving a Jigsaw trap. In reality, however, he made the entire story up in order to find quick fame and success. A flashback shows John Kramer attending a book signing by Bobby; John (whom Bobby does not recognise as Jigsaw) implies that he is aware that Bobby is lying about having survived a Jigsaw trap, and sarcastically says "We've met", thus hinting that he is the Jigsaw killer, after removing the dust jacket from the book and declaring that he does not need the picture. Bobby is later abducted by Jigsaw's successor Mark Hoffman and put into a series of six tests at the abandoned Clear Dawn Psychiatric Hospital, along with his wife Joyce Dagen and three of his key staff members. The first test requires him to escape from a cage suspended above a series of spikes on the floor, which he achieves by releasing the cage's bottom end and swinging himself far enough to jump free. The next three tests each lead to the death of one of his staff members; in the fifth, he must pull out two of his teeth in order to obtain the combination to the door leading to Joyce. For his final test, he is made to undergo the ordeal that he claimed to have endured in his book: he must drive two meat hooks through his pectoral muscles, then haul himself up to connect two extension cords and shut off the electrified wire around Joyce's platform. As he is about to plug in the cords, the hooks tear through his flesh and he drops to the floor, and he watches helplessly as a large metal capsule resembling a brazen bull slams shut around Joyce and she is incinerated within it. His ultimate fate is not revealed.

=== Brad, Dina, and Ryan ===
- Portrayed by Sebastian Pigott (Brad), Anne Lee Greene (Dina), Jon Cor (Ryan)
- Appear in: Saw 3D
- Status: Brad and Ryan alive; Dina deceased
- Died in: Saw 3D (Dina only)

These three victims are placed in a bulletproof storefront window at a public shopping center, while people were watching and attempted to bust them out. Brad and Ryan are chained by the wrists to opposite ends of a worktable, while Dina is suspended above them. A movable carriage with three power saws is attached to the table. A Billy puppet enters the room on his tricycle, and states that Dina has manipulated both men's affections for her in order to coerce them into stealing for her. Since she claimed to love both men, they will have the chance to fight for her love and their survival. In order to save her, one will have to push the carriage to the other's end within 60 seconds, killing him; alternatively, they can spare each other, and Dina will be killed once the timer runs out. After a brief fight in which Dina tries convincing both men to kill each other, Brad is slightly wounded. Now aware that Dina has only been playing them for her amusement, Brad and Ryan ultimately reach a truce, and Dina is bisected by the centre saw, resulting in Brad, Ryan and Billy being covered in her blood, while a large crowd watches.

Brad and Ryan are later seen at Bobby Dagen's Jigsaw survivors meeting. According to the producers' commentary, Brad and Ryan are the two men in the pig masks that help Dr. Lawrence Gordon abduct Mark Hoffman.

=== Cale ===
- Portrayed by Dean Armstrong
- Appears in: Saw 3D
- Status: Deceased
- Died in: Saw 3D

Cale is Bobby Dagen's best friend and co-conspirator. He is accused of "hearing no evil", after choosing to help Bobby carry out his scheme to become famous by fabricating an account of surviving a trap. At the abandoned Clear Dawn Psychiatric Hospital, Cale is blindfolded, with a noose attached to a winch, standing at one end of a hallway with no floor, only the support beams and a few loose planks. Bobby is at the other end, and the key to free Cale hangs from the ceiling between them. In 60 seconds, Bobby attempts to guide Cale across the hallway and get the key. Bobby throws the key to Cale, who misses catching it and dies when the winch lifts him off his feet.

=== Dan, Evan, Jake, and Kara ===
- Portrayed by Dru Viergever (Dan), Chester Bennington (Evan), Benjamin Clost (Jake), Gabby West (Kara)
- Appear in: Saw 3D
- Status: All deceased
- Died in: Saw 3D

These four victims, all members of a racist neo-nazi skinhead gang led by Evan, are placed in a trap set inside a garage at an abandoned junkyard. Evan's back, arms, and legs are glued to the driver's seat of a car, with the rear end of the car supported by jacks. His girlfriend Kara is tied to the floor with barbed wire, her head directly beneath the rear wheel; Dan stands strapped to a pole behind the car, with chains attached to the bumper connected to his wrists and jaw; Jake is chained to the closed garage door in front of the car. In order to save them and himself, Evan must physically tear himself away from the seat and pull a lever protruding from the car's engine compartment within 30 seconds. He manages to free himself at the last second, but fails to reach the lever, and the car is dropped off its jacks, crushing Kara's head. As it speeds forward, Dan's arms and jaw are ripped off, and Jake is killed when the car crashes through the garage door. The car continues travelling until it crashes into a pile of wrecked cars outside, sending Evan flying through the windshield and that of another car, killing him instantly. Mark Hoffman later steals Dan's corpse in order to use it as a decoy, while hiding in its body bag in order to sneak into the police station and find Jill Tuck.

=== Joyce Dagen ===
- Portrayed by Gina Holden
- Appears in: Saw 3D
- Status: Deceased
- Died in: Saw 3D

Joyce Dagen is Bobby's wife, and is unaware that he lied about surviving a Jigsaw trap. She is placed in Bobby's test at the abandoned Clear Dawn Psychiatric Hospital. She wakes up with a collar connected to her neck that gradually draws her closer to the floor, as she watches Bobby's progress. He makes it in time to save her, and must re-enact the test he claimed to have survived; however, he fails to complete it, resulting in Joyce being enclosed in a brazen bull and incinerated.

=== Matt Gibson ===
- Portrayed by Chad Donella
- Appears in: Saw 3D
- Status: Deceased
- Died in: Saw 3D

Matt Gibson is an Internal Affairs detective who takes an interest in the Jigsaw case when Jill Tuck asks to speak to him personally. She offers to turn over evidence of Mark Hoffman's crimes in exchange for police protection and immunity from prosecution. When Gibson was a uniformed officer, he was attacked by a homeless man who took his gun; Hoffman ordered the man to drop the weapon, then killed him. The incident led Gibson to mistrust Hoffman from that moment on, and he and his partner Officer Rogers lead the efforts to find him. Clues left by Hoffman lead Gibson to the observation area of Bobby Dagen's tests, where he and the two officers accompanying him are killed by a remote-controlled machine gun placed in the room.

=== Nina ===
- Portrayed by Naomi Snieckus
- Appears in: Saw 3D
- Status: Deceased
- Died in: Saw 3D

Nina is Bobby Dagen's publicist, who is accused of "speaking no evil" by being his greatest link to the media but never revealing the truth of Bobby being a fraud. She is brought to the abandoned Clear Dawn Psychiatric Hospital; locked in a straitjacket and surrounded by four spikes aimed at her neck. The key to release her is on a hook tied to a fishing line that runs down her throat. Bobby has 60 seconds to pull the hook up from her stomach. Attached to the mechanism is a decibel meter that brings the spikes closer to Nina whenever the sound level rises above a whisper. The timer starts and Bobby repeatedly stops to quiet Nina's screams before he finally retrieves the key, but because she kept screaming, the trap kills her.

=== Officer Palmer ===
- Portrayed by Kim Schraner
- Appears in: Saw 3D
- Status: Deceased
- Died in: Saw 3D

Palmer is an Internal Affairs officer who works with Detective Matt Gibson and traces Mark Hoffman's location based on video messages he sends in. As Hoffman searches for Jill Tuck, he kills Palmer by breaking her neck, then uses her body to trick another officer into opening the door leading to the holding cell area.

=== Officer Rogers ===
- Portrayed by Laurence Anthony
- Appears in: Saw 3D
- Status: Deceased
- Died in: Saw 3D

Rogers is an Internal Affairs officer who helps Detective Matt Gibson investigate Mark Hoffman. Once Gibson figures out Hoffman's location, he puts Rogers in charge of guarding Jill Tuck, who has been moved to a holding cell in the police station for her protection. After Hoffman sneaks into the station, he kills every officer standing between him and Jill; Rogers is killed when he is shot through his eye.

=== Sidney ===
- Portrayed by Oluniké Adeliyi
- Appears in: Saw 3D
- Status: Alive

Sidney is a Jigsaw survivor who appears at Bobby Dagen's support group. She reveals that she had been placed in a trap with her abusive boyfriend Alex. Hanging above a series of upturned lawnmowers, Alex tried to kick her to her death to save himself but was instead struck back by her, causing him to fall into the lawnmowers and be sliced to death. She was freed after this and came to value her life more for overcoming her abuser and surviving.

=== Suzanne ===
- Portrayed by Rebecca Marshall
- Appears in: Saw 3D
- Status: Deceased
- Died in: Saw 3D

Suzanne is Bobby Dagen's lawyer, who is accused of "seeing no evil" by ignoring her duty as a lawyer and turning a blind eye to Bobby's fraud. Her test occurs at the abandoned Clear Dawn Psychiatric Hospital; she is placed horizontally inside a steel frame that begins to rotate her in a standing position, where three spikes are placed to impale her through the eyes and mouth. To save her, Bobby must lift a pair of weights at shoulder height and hold them for at least 30 seconds, until the 60 second timer expires, in order to stop Suzanne's rig from approaching the spikes. However, as he does this, two rods pierce his sides. Bobby attempts to hold it, but continues to drop it. Suzanne is inches from death, and with just one second left, Bobby drops it and she is killed.

== Jigsaw ==
=== Anna ===
- Portrayed by Laura Vandervoort
- Appears in: Jigsaw
- Status: Deceased
- Died in: Jigsaw

Anna is one of the five victims in the barn games. While she and her husband Matthew lived next door to John Kramer, she was enraged by her baby's constant crying. She asphyxiated him to death and placed the body in bed next to Matthew to make it seem as if he had rolled over onto the baby. Matthew went insane and was committed to a mental institution, where he later committed suicide. In the third trap, Anna and Mitch are locked in a grain silo, at risk of being buried alive or cut to death by the grain and sharp objects pouring in. They are saved when Ryan pulls a lever to release them, at the cost of severing his own leg. Later, in the fifth game, Anna and Ryan are chained to pipes at opposite sides of a room and given a shotgun loaded with one shell. Anna tries to shoot Ryan, but the gun explodes in her face and kills her, having been rigged to backfire.

=== Brad Halloran ===
- Portrayed by Callum Keith Rennie
- Appears in: Jigsaw
- Status: Deceased
- Died in: Jigsaw

Brad Halloran is a homicide detective in the city police department. He takes the lead role in the investigation of several deaths in which jigsaw puzzle pieces have been cut from the bodies; all the victims are associated in some way with his past cases. He begins to suspect medical examiner Logan Nelson and his assistant Eleanor Bonneville of being involved, and trails them to an abandoned pig farm where the new games are being played. During a fight with Logan, both men are knocked out and placed in collars with laser cutters set to kill them unless they confess their sins. After forcing Logan to go first, Halloran admits that he has taken bribes and planted evidence, allowing guilty criminals to go free and innocent people to be sent to prison in their place. After tape recording this confession and planting evidence to frame Halloran as the new Jigsaw Killer, Logan activates the collar and slices his head open, killing him.

=== Carly ===
- Portrayed by Brittany Allen
- Appears in: Jigsaw
- Status: Deceased
- Died in: Jigsaw

Carly is one of the five victims in the barn games. She had stolen a purse from a woman who suffered from asthma; without her inhaler, the woman suffered a fatal asthma attack when she gave chase. For the second game, Carly is presented with three hypodermic syringes, one of which contains the antidote for a poison that has been injected into her system. Another contains saline solution, and the third holds a lethal acid. If she does nothing, she and the other three still-living victims (Anna, Mitch, and Ryan) will be lifted off their feet and strangled to death by the collars locked around their necks. Carly refuses to choose and fights Ryan. However, he overpowers her and injects all three syringes into her neck, dissolving her face and killing her. It is later revealed that the syringe containing the antidote was labelled with the value of the money that Carly stole from her asthmatic victim.

=== Edgar Munsen ===
- Portrayed by Josiah Black
- Appears in: Jigsaw
- Status: Deceased
- Died in: Jigsaw

Edgar Munsen is a meth addict and criminal, having been arrested twice, once for the murder of Christine Nelson, but was released by Detective Brad Halloran. Edgar is later put in a test by the new Jigsaw Killer: find and trigger a mechanism to activate a game, or die. Edgar succeeds in activating the trigger, but is shot by Logan Nelson via his sniper and hospitalized. Edgar is later abducted, and found buried in John Kramer's grave with his throat slit.

=== Eleanor Bonneville ===
- Portrayed by Hannah Emily Anderson
- Appears in: Jigsaw
- Status: Alive

Eleanor Bonneville assists Logan Nelson in performing autopsies of crime victims for the police department. She has a deep fascination with the Jigsaw murders, bordering on obsession, and has built replicas of several Jigsaw traps. When she shows her work to Logan, Detective Keith Hunt follows them and takes pictures, leading Detective Brad Halloran to order their arrest. Based on analysis of trace evidence on the latest victims' bodies, Eleanor determines the location of the new game, an abandoned pig farm, and takes Logan there; Halloran follows and ambushes them, but she escapes and flags down a car.

=== Keith Hunt ===
- Portrayed by Clé Bennett
- Appears in: Jigsaw
- Status: Alive

Keith Hunt is Detective Brad Halloran's partner in the homicide squad, but has been assigned there from the Internal Affairs office to keep an eye on him. Hunt follows Logan Nelson and Eleanor Bonneville to Eleanor's studio and secretly takes pictures of the Jigsaw trap replicas that she has built, leading Halloran to suspect Logan and/or Eleanor of being the perpetrator of the new games. Hunt arrests Logan on Halloran's orders, but releases him after finding evidence (planted by Logan) that implicates Halloran as the new Jigsaw Killer.

=== Logan Nelson ===
- Portrayed by Matt Passmore
- Appears in: Jigsaw
- Status: Alive

Logan Nelson is the medical examiner for the city police department. He had served with the United States Army in Fallujah during the Iraq War, but was captured, interrogated, and tortured by the enemy. This experience, combined with the trauma of his wife Christine's murder, leads Detective Brad Halloran to suspect him as the new Jigsaw. When Logan and his assistant, Eleanor Bonneville, find the site of the new game, Halloran ambushes them; both Logan and Halloran are knocked out and placed in collars rigged to fire laser cutters at their heads unless they confess their wrongdoing. Logan appears to die when his collar activates, but then stands up alive and well after Halloran admits to his own unethical behavior as a police officer.

Logan reveals to Halloran that 10 years ago, while working at a hospital, he had inadvertently mixed-up John Kramer's x-rays with those of another patient, leading to a delay in treatment for John's cancer that allowed it to become terminal. He was placed into one of John's games, in which he was wounded on a set of circular saws. Choosing to spare Logan because he had made an honest mistake, John recruited him as an apprentice; it is revealed that Logan assisted in preparing the reverse bear trap depicted in the first film. In the present, Logan sets up a new barn game using three people associated with Halloran's past cases (including Christine's murder) in order to draw him in and frame him as the new Jigsaw Killer. With Halloran's confession on tape, Logan activates Halloran's collar, which slices his head open.

=== Matthew ===
- Portrayed by Edward Ruttle
- Appears in: Jigsaw
- Status: Deceased
- Died in: Jigsaw

Matthew was Anna's husband and John Kramer's neighbor. While they were kind to John and had a baby, Matthew and Anna frequently got into fights. Anna later killed the baby and made it look like Matthew had smothered it in his sleep. Matthew was driven insane with grief, and put in a mental institution where he eventually committed suicide.

=== Mitch ===
- Portrayed by Mandela Van Peebles
- Appears in: Jigsaw
- Status: Deceased
- Died in: Jigsaw

Mitch is one of the five victims in the barn game. He had sold a motorcycle to John Kramer's nephew years earlier, concealing the fact that the brakes were faulty, and the nephew had died in an accident as a result. During the third game, Mitch and Anna are locked in a grain silo and at risk of being buried alive or cut to death by the grain and sharp objects pouring in. Ryan saves them by pulling a lever, which severs his lower leg. For the fourth game, Mitch is suspended upside down and slowly lowered toward a helical blade spun by the engine of that same motorcycle. In order to save himself, he must reach down through the center of the blade and pull the engine's brake handle, which he is assured actually works. Anna jams the mechanism for a few seconds, but before Mitch can reach the brake, it starts spinning again and slices him to death.

=== Ryan ===
- Portrayed by Paul Braunstein
- Appears in: Jigsaw
- Status: Deceased
- Died in: Jigsaw

Ryan is one of the five victims in the barn game. While in high school, his drunken carousing led to a car accident in which two of his friends and the driver of the other car were killed. During the third game, he tries to leave the barn through a door marked "No Exit", but steps on a rigged patch of floor and gets his leg caught in a set of sharpened steel cables that slowly constrict, tearing into his flesh. When Anna and Mitch become trapped in a grain silo under a flood of pouring grain and sharp objects, he must pull a lever to save them and free himself; doing so causes the cables to sever his lower leg. Later, in the fifth game, Ryan and Anna are chained to pipes at opposite sides of a room and given a shotgun loaded with one shell. Anna tries to shoot Ryan, but the gun explodes in her face and kills her, having been rigged to backfire. Ryan discovers that the keys to free both of them had been inside the shotgun shell, but the gun's discharge destroyed them and left him with no way to free himself. It is revealed that he later died, and his body was left in the barn to rot.

=== Solomon ===
- Portrayed by Shaquan Lewis
- Appears in: Jigsaw
- Status: Alive

Solomon is one of the officers at the beginning of Jigsaw who assists in chasing and confronting Edgar Munsen, along with Halloran, Keith Hunt, Palermo, and other officers. When Edgar uses a trigger device, Solomon and the other officers shoot his hand off.

== Spiral ==
=== Angie Garza ===
- Portrayed by Marisol Nichols
- Appears in: Spiral
- Status: Deceased
- Died in: Spiral

Angie Garza is a police captain and head of the homicide department of the South Metro Precinct. During Marcus Banks' tenure as chief of police, she worked alongside him to cover up corruption as part of the Article 8 policy and was promoted to captain at age 35. She is one of the few officers who does not mistreat Zeke Banks, but insists on partnering him with rookie detective William Schenk so he learns to work as part of a team. She assigns Zeke as the lead officer investigating the Spiral murders, despite initially selecting Lieutenant Tim O'Brien for the role. Angie is lured into the cold case evidence room located in the precinct basement, where she is placed in a trap that will pour molten wax onto her face unless she severs her spinal cord. Despite doing so, she dies of her injuries before she can be rescued.

=== Barrett ===
- Portrayed by Morgan David Jones
- Appears in: Spiral
- Status: Alive

Barrett is police office of the South Metro Precinct, and is one of the officers who arrested the group of criminals Zeke was undercover with. Barrett was later attacked as a distraction while Angie Garza was kidnapped and placed in a trap under the police station.

=== Benny ===
- Portrayed by Chad Camilleri
- Appears in: Spiral
- Status: Deceased
- Died in: Spiral

Benny is paid to lure Detective Marv Bozwick into a subway tunnel so he could be abducted and placed in a trap. Later, Benny is himself abducted and killed via skinning, with his flayed corpse initially believed to be that of William Schenk.

=== Deborah Kraus ===
- Portrayed by Edie Inksetter
- Appears in: Spiral
- Status: Alive

Deborah Kraus is a detective in the South Metro Precinct homicide department, partnered with Detective Fitch. It is never specified that she is corrupt, but she's part of the group of officers who mistreat Zeke Banks after he reported his partner for corruption. Kraus and Fitch split up when pursuing a lead on Detective Marv Bozwick's murder, and although Fitch tries to call her as backup, she is unable to answer her phone. When attending the crime scene after Fitch is found dead, Kraus is seen crying and provides Banks with the information they had obtained.

=== Detective Fitch ===
- Portrayed by Richard Zeppieri
- Appears in: Spiral
- Status: Deceased
- Died in: Spiral

Fitch is a corrupt homicide detective in the South Metro Precinct. During his time as a patrol officer, he shot a motorist dead for insulting him, but the matter was covered up. He also refused to respond to Detective Zeke Banks' call for backup 12 years prior to the events of the film, which resulted in Zeke getting shot. Fitch is partnered with Detective Deborah Kraus, and whilst pursuing a lead in the investigation into the murder of Detective Marv Bozwick he decides to go after a suspect himself, as opposed to informing Zeke. He is captured by the Jigsaw copycat and placed in a trap where he has to choose between having his fingers ripped off or being electrocuted in a bath of water. Whilst in the trap he is shown dash cam footage of him gunning down the innocent driver years prior. Fitch is too slow in activating the mechanism to pull off his fingers, resulting in him getting electrocuted to death.

=== Jeannie Lewis ===
- Portrayed by Ali Johnson
- Appears in: Spiral
- Status: Alive

Jeannie Lewis is a uniformed patrol officer at the South Metro Precinct who is seen assisting Detective Zeke Banks and the homicide department with their investigations into the Jigsaw copycat killer. She is shown to be one of the few officers who does not mistreat Banks due to his reputation as a snitch. The first "gift" for Zeke (a box containing the tongue and badge of Detective Marv Bozwick) is dropped off to her at the reception area of the precinct. She later detains a second courier with a second package along with other uniformed officers. When Captain Angie Garza goes missing, it is Lewis who assists Zeke in gaining access to the building's cold case evidence room (located in a repurposed bank vault), however they are too late to save Angie from being killed by the trap she was put in.

=== Marcus Banks ===
- Portrayed by Samuel L. Jackson
- Appears in: Spiral
- Status: Deceased
- Died in: Spiral

Marcus Banks is the former chief of police and father of Zeke Banks. As chief he devised and introduced the controversial Article 8 policing policy, which saw the force turn a blind eye to police brutality and corruption to give officers more leeway to fight crime. He also struggled balancing his role as a police officer and protecting his son from police retribution after turning in a dirty cop. Marcus is lured into a trap by William Schenk, where he is strung up like a marionette and has his blood drained. Zeke is forced to use his last bullet to shoot a target that releases his father, instead of killing Schenk. However, an incoming SWAT team triggers a tripwire that resuspends Marcus, and forces him to raise his arm towards the officers, resulting in them gunning him down.

=== Marv Bozwick ===
- Portrayed by Dan Petronijevic
- Appears in: Spiral
- Status: Deceased
- Died in: Spiral

Marv "Boz" Bozwick is a homicide detective and friend of Detective Zeke Banks, he was one of the few officers who did not turn on Banks when he reported a fellow officer for corruption. At the start of the film, Bozwick pursues a mugger into a subway tunnel and is knocked out and placed into a trap by the Jigsaw copycat. He awakens balanced on a stool with his tongue in a vise, and a video recording of the killer accuses him of being corrupt and lying on the witness stand numerous times, resulting in false convictions. He is given the choice to either jump from the stool and sever his tongue, or remain suspended and be hit by the oncoming train. Bozwick is unable to escape in time and is killed when the train impacts him. Banks and William Schenk are the detectives first on the scene, with Zeke later being led to Bozwick's severed tongue and badge. Bozwick is mentioned to be married with a young son.

=== Peter Dunleavy ===
- Portrayed by Patrick McManus
- Appears in: Spiral
- Status: Deceased
- Died in: Spiral

Peter "Pete" Dunleavy is a former patrol officer and partner of Zeke Banks, he murdered a witness who was due to testify against a corrupt officer 15 years prior to the events of the film. Despite planting a weapon on the innocent man, Banks remained suspicious of the circumstances of the shooting, and later reported him. Dunleavy was fired from the police and imprisoned for a number of years, causing Banks to become a pariah within the department due to "ratting" on a fellow cop. After being released from prison he works in a church and lives in the basement, leading an Alcoholics Anonymous 12-step program for fellow recovering alcoholics. Dunleavy is later kidnapped by the Jigsaw copycat killer and suspended from the ceiling of an abandoned factory, in front of a device that crushes glass bottles and shoots the shards forward at high speed. Banks is also kidnapped and placed in the same room, given the option to either save Dunleavy or let him die. Although Banks tries to save his former partner's life, his body is too badly cut up by the glass and he dies before being untied.

=== Tim O'Brien ===
- Portrayed by Thomas Mitchell
- Appears in: Spiral
- Status: Alive

Tim O'Brien is a lieutenant in the South Metro Precinct homicide department and the second in command under Captain Angie Garza. He is one of many officers who mistreats Detective Zeke Banks due to him reporting his partner for corruption. O'Brien is initially assigned as lead detective in the Spiral copycat murders, but is replaced by Banks as part of official protocol. As more officers are killed he accuses Zeke of being involved, resulting in the two of them almost getting physical with one another. After the death of Angie, it can be presumed he is the acting head of the homicide department in the South Metro Precinct.

=== William Schenk / Emmerson ===
- Portrayed by Max Minghella and Leonidas Castrounis (young)
- Appears in: Spiral
- Status: Alive

William Emmerson is the son of Charlie Emmerson, and witnessed his father being murdered by corrupt officer Peter Dunleavy fifteen years prior to the events of the film. Dunleavy was later arrested and imprisoned as a result of Zeke Banks reporting him. Planning to exact his revenge on the organization, Schenk joins the police 12 years later under the alias William Schenk, and is assigned as Zeke's partner when he first makes detective. Taking inspiration from the Jigsaw Killer, he devises a series of "games" to punish corrupt officers, resulting in the deaths of Detective Marv Bozwick, Detective Fitch, Captain Angie Garza, and former officer Dunleavy. He fakes his own death, making it appear he has been captured and skinned alive by the copycat killer. Using Zeke's phone, he lures former chief of police Marcus Banks into a trap, blaming him for facilitating the corruption under Article 8 that resulted in his father being murdered. He proposes a partnership with Zeke, with Zeke locating corrupt officers and him killing them. In order for Zeke to prove his loyalty, he makes him choose between using his last bullet to either shoot him or free his father from a trap. Zeke frees his father, but then fights Schenk and gains the upper hand. However, an incoming SWAT team sets off a tripwire, resulting in Marcus' death. Schenk is able to get away and his current whereabouts are unknown.

=== Zeke Banks ===
- Portrayed by Chris Rock
- Appears in: Spiral
- Status: Alive

Ezekiel "Zeke" Banks is a detective in the South Metro Precinct homicide division assigned to investigate the "Spiral" Jigsaw copycat killings targeting police officers. He is a pariah within the department, having reported his corrupt partner Peter Dunleavy for murdering a witness years prior, resulting in him being imprisoned. As a young detective, Zeke was shot by a suspect when other officers refused to provide him backup. He mentions he has a son, and is in the process of divorcing his wife, Lisa. Zeke is paired with rookie William Schenk to investigate the copycat murders of police officers, including his good friend Detective Marv Bozwick. He is drawn to a final trap where his former partner Dunleavy is suspended from the ceiling, and is impacted by high-speed flying glass shards. Although Zeke tries to save Dunleavy, he dies from his injuries before he can be freed. Leaving the room, Zeke encounters Schenk, who is revealed to be the killer and faked his own death. Schenk tells Zeke he is actually William Emmerson, the son of the witness murdered by Dunleavy 15 years prior. Knowing Zeke is a good cop, he proposes they become partners, with Zeke locating corrupt officers and him killing them. In order for Zeke to prove his loyalty, Schenk shows him the final game. Having kidnapped Zeke's father Marcus, whose policies as chief of police enabled the corruption, he is strung up and being drained of blood. Schenk makes Zeke choose between using his last bullet to free his father (by shooting a metal plate that releases the wires) or shoot him. Zeke frees his father, but then fights Schenk and gains the upper hand. However, a tripwire is set off by an incoming SWAT team, which forces Marcus to raise his hand (with a gun attached to the restraints) and he is subsequently shot by them. Zeke is last seen screaming at the SWAT officers shooting his father whilst Schenk escapes.

== Saw X ==
=== Carlos ===
- Portrayed by Jorge Briseño
- Appears in: Saw X
- Status: Alive

Carlos is a boy who plays outside Cecilia Pederson's clinic, often kicking a soccer ball against an outer wall. John fixes his bicycle shortly after arriving at the clinic. Parker Sears forces John and Carlos to take Cecilia's place in a trap meant for her, clamping them down on their backs to opposite ends of a seesaw. As blood pours down on both of them, either one can pull a lever within reach to tip the seesaw down toward his own end and stop the flow on his partner's end, allowing that person a respite. John repeatedly urges Carlos not to pull the lever at his end, but Carlos nevertheless does so in order to give John a chance to breathe. They are both released when Cecilia and Parker trigger a trap set for them in John's control room. John gives Carlos a bag containing the money that the con artists have swindled from their victims, and they depart along with Amanda.

=== Cecilia Pederson ===
- Portrayed by Synnøve Macody Lund
- Appears in: Saw X
- Status: Unknown

Cecilia presents herself as the daughter of a medical researcher who has developed a treatment method that can cure virtually any form of cancer. After John undergoes the treatment, however, he discovers that it is a fraud. He and Amanda Young abduct Cecilia and her co-conspirators in the scheme and put them through a series of tests. Cecilia has a collar locked around her neck that is attached to a platform by a long chain. She pulls her phone into reach using Valentina's intestines as a rope, but Amanda takes it from her. Later, her accomplice Parker Sears holds John at gunpoint and forces him and Carlos to take Cecilia's place in the test. When Cecilia tries to flee with Parker and the money they have swindled, they set off a trap in John's control room that pumps in a lethal gas and frees John and Carlos. Cecilia stabs Parker to death and finds a breathing hole in the wall, but the gas has already caused severe blistering all over her body. John, Amanda and Carlos exit the clinic, leaving Cecilia trapped in the hole; her fate is not revealed.

=== Custodian ===
- Portrayed by Isan Beomhyun Lee
- Appears in: Saw X
- Status: Alive

An unnamed custodian appears in the opening scene in Saw X, when John Kramer is at the hospital. John witnesses the custodian stealing a watch from a patient, and imagines him in a trap in which he has vacuum tubes over his eyes, connected to a mask that is locked to his face; the stolen watch is used as a timer. In order to escape with his sight intact, the custodian (whose occupation John describes as a noble one, as he prevents people from becoming sick) must turn a dial on a machine that will break all of the fingers on his right hand. In John's vision, the custodian fails to do so in time and his eyes are sucked through the tubes; it is not known if he would have survived this. However, back in the present, the custodian notices John watching him and returns the watch to the patient. As he leaves, John tells him "Good choice".

=== Diego ===
- Portrayed by Joshua Okamoto
- Appears in: Saw X
- Status: Alive

Diego is a taxi driver who picks John up upon his arrival in Mexico City and drives him to a rendezvous point for transport to Cecilia Pederson's clinic. John later discovers that Cecilia's cancer treatment is a fraud and abducts Diego, having recognized him as one of the "surgeons" who operated on him. Diego has a scalpel taped to each hand and a bomb attached to each wrist with galvanized wire; he is given three minutes to save himself. Since the scalpels cannot cut through the wires, he must instead cut away enough flesh to let him slip the bombs off his arms. He succeeds in doing so, and survives the explosion, after which John enters the room with a first aid kit to tend to his wounds. It is later revealed that John interrogated Diego about the scam before his game began, learning the names of everyone involved in it.

=== Gabriela ===
- Portrayed by Renata Vaca
- Appears in: Saw X
- Status: Deceased
- Died in: Saw X

Gabriela presents herself as a recovering cancer patient at Cecilia's clinic, owing her survival to the doctor's revolutionary treatment program, but she is actually a drug addict who buys pills from Mateo. She becomes the third victim of the tests John devises to avenge himself against Cecilia and her fellow con artists. Gabriela is suspended from the ceiling by shackles attached to her left wrist and right ankle, and must use a sledgehammer to smash her hand and foot in order to free herself and escape from being bombarded with ionizing radiation. She does so, suffering severe radiation burns in the process. John directs Amanda to take Gabriela to a hospital, but is halted due to Parker subduing him and Amanda. Cecilia is freed by Parker and breaks Gabriela's neck, killing her, in with Cecilia referred to her as a liability.

=== Henry Kessler ===
- Portrayed by Michael Beach
- Appears in: Saw X
- Status: Unknown

Henry is a fellow member of a cancer patients' support group that John attends. He tells John of a revolutionary treatment program that has sent his cancer into remission, showing off a surgical scar on his abdomen. After John undergoes the treatment, discovers it to be a fraud, and avenges himself against those responsible, he realises that Henry had been recruited by Cecilia Pederson to lure him into the swindle. After John returns from Mexico, he and Hoffman capture Henry and suspend him by his wrists from the ceiling of the bathroom seen in the first film. Discovering that Henry's scar was a fake, they prepare to play a game by attaching a device to his abdomen that is set to slice into it. His fate is not revealed.

=== Mateo ===
- Portrayed by Octavio Hinojosa
- Appears in: Saw X
- Status: Deceased
- Died in: Saw X

Mateo presents himself as an anesthesiologist at Cecilia Peterson's cancer clinic, but he is actually a veterinarian who deals drugs on the side, with Gabriela as one of his customers. Once John uncovers the fraudulent nature of Cecilia's clinic, he has Amanda abduct Mateo and put him into the tests intended as revenge against the con artists. Mateo, the second to be tested, is strapped into a chair and given three minutes to cut into his skull, remove a portion of his own brain, and drop it into a container of enzyme solution to dissolve it. If he removes a large enough portion, he will trigger a circuit that will open a cubicle holding a key that he can use to free himself. He succeeds in extracting his brain tissue, but it does not dissolve quickly enough before the time runs out, and a mask with heating elements inside closes on his head, killing him.

=== Parker Sears ===
- Portrayed by Steven Brand
- Appears in: Saw X
- Status: Deceased
- Died in: Saw X

Parker is a patient at Cecilia's clinic, recovering from surgery as John arrives. After John learns of the scam and begins testing those involved, Parker barges in on him and Amanda and holds them at gunpoint, declaring his intent to kill Cecilia for scamming him. John persuades him to calm down and observe the tests, but Parker later recovers his gun and forces John and Carlos to take Cecilia's place in her trap. Parker reveals himself as Cecilia's accomplice in the scam and forces John and Carlos in the trap meant for Cecilia. While searching for the money, Parker realized the game meant for Cecilia was a 2-person game and pondered who her opponent was. Cecilia brushed it off and retrieved the bag of money, only to inadvertently trigger a trap set for them in John's control room and free John and Carlos. As the room fills with deadly gas, Cecilia and Parker are forced to fight over a single source of fresh air, and Cecilia stabs Parker to death.

=== Valentina ===
- Portrayed by Paulette Hernández
- Appears in: Saw X
- Status: Deceased
- Died in: Saw X

Valentina is a sex worker who presents herself as a nurse in Cecilia Pederson's cancer treatment clinic. After John discovers the clinic to be a fraud, he and Amanda Young abduct her and make her the first subject of the tests John has devised to get revenge. She is latched into a chair by her neck, with a Gigli saw poised at neck level, and she is given a second Gigli saw and a tourniquet. She has three minutes to amputate her own leg and suction out enough bone marrow from her femur to tip a scale and release herself. Although she performs the amputation and begins to collect the marrow, she fails to collect enough before the timer reaches zero, and is decapitated by the saw poised at her neck. This was due to Valentina threatening John and Amanda and attempting to force her way out rather than follow the rules. Cecilia later disembowels Valentina's corpse and uses her intestines as a makeshift rope to pull her phone into reach so she can call for help.

== Saw: The Video Game ==
=== Jennings Foster ===
- Portrayed by Troy Lund
- Appears in: Saw: The Video Game, Saw II: Flesh & Blood
- Status: Alive

Jennings Foster is the head of a CSI team who cooperates with David Tapp's department to solve murder cases. Unbeknownst to others, Jennings committed a hit-and-run years ago that led him to frame an innocent citizen to avoid conviction himself. For this, Jigsaw places Jennings as a victim for Tapp to save in a pendulum trap. Tapp saves him, but Jennings blames Tapp for being there and runs away. He also makes a brief appearance in Saw II: Flesh & Blood, where he is seen assisting the investigation into Tapp's death and photographing Tapp's apartment. In one of the case files, he seems to be very grateful towards Tapp for saving his life.

=== Melissa Sing ===
- Portrayed by Kahn Doan
- Appears in: Saw: The Video Game, Saw II: Flesh & Blood (mentioned only)
- Status: Alive

Melissa Sing is the widow of Detective Steven Sing, who is killed after falling victim to one of Jigsaw's traps in Saw. Upon Sing's death, Melissa becomes a neglectful parent to her son Franklin, and blames David Tapp for ruining her family. For this, she is placed in Whitehurst Asylum during Saw: The Video Game in an iron-maiden trap for Tapp to save her from. Tapp saves her, but she leaves him quickly. During the finale of the game, if the player chooses the "Truth" door, Melissa is revealed to have been held against her will following her trap and was forced to help Jigsaw, keeping Tapp's game going until 6:00, or her son would die. Attempting to evade Tapp, she is accidentally killed by a shotgun trap. However, in the "Freedom" ending, she is saved along with the other surviving victims in the asylum and set free, never having her incidental ties to Jigsaw revealed.

A file written by Tapp in Saw II: Flesh & Blood confirms that Melissa survived the events of the previous game; the "Freedom" ending is further revealed to be canon to the franchise due to newspapers reporting Tapp's suicide following his escape.

=== Oswald McGillicutty ===
- Portrayed by David Scully
- Appears in: Saw (mentioned only), Saw: The Video Game, Saw II: Flesh & Blood (mentioned only)
- Status: Deceased
- Died in: Saw: The Video Game

Oswald McGillicutty is the newspaper writer who coined the nickname "The Jigsaw Killer". One of his articles is seen in Saw. In the game, Oswald is placed in Whitehurst Asylum due to Jigsaw believing Oswald is perverting his message and also for accusing David Tapp of being the real Jigsaw Killer. It is revealed in case files that Oswald was originally writing a novel about Jigsaw, but his notes were stolen by Pamela Jenkins in an effort to thwart him and write a book of her own. Tapp finds Oswald in a folding table trap, which he releases him from, only for Oswald to be killed by sharp slabs of metal immediately after.

=== Pighead ===
- Appears in: Saw: The Video Game, Saw II: Flesh & Blood (mentioned only)
- Status: Deceased
- Died in: Saw: The Video Game

Pighead is a masked person who works for Jigsaw. He appears in Saw: The Video Game and watches over David Tapp's game. He is shown to be hostile and is witnessed by Tapp killing several test subjects around Whitehurst Asylum. Pighead seems to taunt Tapp throughout the game, and sometimes attempts to come after him. Later on, near the end of the game, Tapp is required to fight Pighead, who wants to kill Tapp and sabotage his game in order to surpass Jigsaw. Tapp manages to kill Pighead and get hold of a key to the library where his final choice is awaiting. Jigsaw rhetorically asks Tapp if he's a "murderer" for killing his servant. Pighead wears a red boxer robe and the infamous pig mask concealing his identity. He is referenced in one of Tapp's audio tapes in Saw II: Flesh & Blood, with Tapp feeling guilt having killed him, not knowing if the person in the costume had a family or was another victim forced to obey Jigsaw.

== Saw II: Flesh & Blood ==
=== Campbell Iman ===
- Appears in: Saw II: Flesh & Blood
- Status: Deceased
- Died in: Saw II: Flesh & Blood

Campbell Iman is one of the two main protagonists and the brief playable character of Saw II: Flesh & Blood. He is targeted by Jigsaw because of his addiction to drugs and his estrangement from his son, who is also a drug addict. His last name is mentioned in a case file that also revealed that he has lymphoma. Jigsaw places him in a "Venus flytrap" device that he escapes by cutting out a key buried near his own eye. After traversing several traps, Campbell is informed that there is another subject, Michael Tapp, in the game and that only one may live. Campbell is given the choice of sacrificing himself for a stranger, who has a potentially long life ahead of him, or saving himself, knowing he has a short time left to live because of his cancer. This choice decides the fate of Michael Tapp at the end of the game.

If Campbell sacrifices himself, he gets crushed by spiked moving walls. If Campbell chooses to save himself, Michael dies and Campbell meets Jigsaw who informs him that his son is safe, having passed his own test prior to the events of the game, and all he has to do is leave through the exit. Campbell instead attempts to attack Jigsaw only to be killed by a concealed, falling scythe.

=== Henry Jacobs ===
- Appears in: Saw II: Flesh & Blood
- Status: Deceased
- Died in: Saw II: Flesh & Blood

Henry Jacobs is the chief of police in David Tapp's precinct. He is involved in the Jigsaw cases and is the chief officer involved in the investigation into Tapp's death. Henry is involved in a conspiracy alongside Joseph Poltzer, Carla Song, and Sarah Blalok to steal seized drugs and sell them on the streets, bringing him to Jigsaw's attention. When Michael Tapp finds him, Henry is strapped to a chair with a revolver placed in his mouth that will fire unless Michael can pass a test. Even though Henry appears helpful upon his release, he begins stalking Michael throughout the game in order to kill him and prevent his corruption from being revealed. After Joseph escapes, Henry finds and allies himself with him in order to find Michael and any others who could reveal their secrets, leading him to murder Carla. Henry later runs into Pighead II, who stabs him repeatedly in the chest.

=== Joseph Poltzer ===
- Appears in: Saw II: Flesh & Blood
- Status: Deceased
- Died in: Saw II: Flesh & Blood

Joseph Poltzer is a corrupt vice cop who abuses his position to steal drugs seized from criminals and sell them in a cartel, alongside Henry Jacobs, Carla Song, and Sarah Blalok. As a member of the group, he is kidnapped by Jigsaw and placed in a vise trap designed to crush all of his limbs and his skull unless Michael Tapp can save him. Michael's father David Tapp had accidentally uncovered their drug cartel while investigating Jigsaw, so Joseph teams up with Henry to hunt and kill Michael, Carla, and Sarah to tie up any loose ends that could reveal their criminal actions. He later executes Sarah as she is about to reveal the true identity of Pighead II. He and Michael get embroiled in a fight that results in them breaking through a wall and plummeting into an alley below. They struggle over Joseph's gun, but Michael eventually triumphs and fatally shoots Joseph in the head.

=== Michael Tapp ===
- Appears in: Saw II: Flesh & Blood
- Status: Unknown (depends on player's choice)
- Died in: Saw II: Flesh & Blood (possibly)

Michael Tapp is Detective David Tapp's estranged son and one of the two main protagonists and the main playable character in Saw II: Flesh & Blood. He is a reporter, investigating his father's recent death when he is captured by Pighead II and forced to undergo a series of lethal traps set up by Jigsaw. As he progresses through the game he saves several people, freeing Henry Jacobs, Sarah Blalok, Joseph Poltzer, Carla Song, and Solomon Bates while surviving other victims loose in the game; criminals previously arrested by his father after revenge on his son. Though initially friendly, Henry, and later Joseph, begin stalking Michael in order to kill him and prevent their corruption and role in a drug cartel being revealed, should Michael escape. Henry is killed by Pighead II before he can kill him however, and Michael is able to kill Joseph himself. During the game, Michael is revealed to have abused his strained relationship with his father to steal documents pertaining to the Jigsaw case, including Tapp's botched sting that resulted in Detective Steven Sing's death. Using this information for personal gain and revenge against his father for feelings of abandonment, Michael wrote an exposé that destroyed his father's career, unwittingly aiding the drug cartel run by Henry and Joseph, and partially contributing to his father's eventual suicide.

In the finale, it is revealed that Campbell Iman and Michael's tests had occurred concurrently, with Michael's fate left in Campbell's hands. Campbell is given the choice at the end of his own test to sacrifice himself for Michael, a stranger, or save himself at Michael's expense. If Campbell chooses himself, Michael is trapped and crushed to death by a spiked moving ceiling. If Campbell sacrifices himself, Michael survives. Jigsaw reveals that Michael's real test is to see if he had the ability to punish the corrupt (Henry and Joseph) and so he is given a choice between two doors; one leads Michael to freedom and the chance to use the evidence found by his father to print the story of Jigsaw and the drug cartel. The other door reveals a Pighead costume and an offer to help people see the truth inside themselves, implying Michael can become Jigsaw's apprentice. The choice made is not revealed to the player.

=== Pighead II ===
- Appears in: Saw II: Flesh & Blood
- Status: Alive

Pighead II is a replacement for Pighead, who died during the events of the first game. Little is known about the character except that he is garbed in similar attire to the original Pighead and that he is involved in placing some individuals into their respective traps, including Carla Song. Throughout the game, he can be seen kidnapping Michael Tapp and killing other victims. He later corners and kills Henry Jacobs. Before her death, Sarah Blalok indicates that Michael knows the man behind the pig mask and that he is a friend of his father David Tapp. However, she is killed before she reveals his identity. Although Pighead II appears to work for Jigsaw, he commits acts of murder against his philosophy. Although his identity is never confirmed, it is possible that Pighead II is Mark Hoffman, since Hoffman knew Tapp and he was a murderer, unlike Jigsaw.

=== Sarah Blalok ===
- Appears in: Saw II: Flesh & Blood
- Status: Deceased
- Died in: Saw II: Flesh & Blood

Sarah Blalok is a drug addict, prostitute, and an informant for David Tapp. Tapp gives her a second chance by helping her escape from her previous life. Following his death, however, she begins to fall back into her previous lifestyle. She blames Michael Tapp for betraying his father and contributing to his suicide. Michael finds her trapped in a sealed tank slowly filling with water and is forced to solve a puzzle to free her before she drowns. Though initially hostile towards Michael, she later becomes more friendly, explaining that his father loved Michael even after his betrayal. She is revealed to have been part of a criminal conspiracy alongside Carla Song, Henry Jacobs, and Joseph Poltzer; her role being to sell drugs on the streets. While searching for Jigsaw, Tapp discovered their drug cartel and Sarah was used to mislead him, even though she was aware that he was not concerned about the drug cartel because of his obsession with Jigsaw. Through her own admission, it is revealed that she had feelings for Tapp. She is found by Joseph as she is about to disclose the identity of Pighead II. Joseph sneaks up on Sarah and shoots her in the head.

=== Solomon Bates ===
- Appears in: Saw II: Flesh & Blood
- Status: Unknown (likely deceased)
- Died in: Saw II: Flesh & Blood (possibly)

Solomon Bates is an accountant involved in a housing development project with John Kramer and Art Blank before the events that would turn John into Jigsaw. He is later responsible for using his accountancy role to hide the illegal money made by the drug cartel consisting of Henry Jacobs, Joseph Poltzer, Carla Song, and Sarah Blalok, thus bringing him to Jigsaw's attention. Solomon is initially found trapped inside a movable cage alongside Michael Tapp during the latter's first test prepared by Jigsaw. Both men have to race to push their cages over a floor covered in broken glass towards the exit, with the winner receiving their freedom. Solomon manages to reach the end first and escapes. After Jigsaw gives Michael a second chance, Michael later encounters Solomon again during his trials. Solomon is seen chained to a suspended cart set on a track filled with slowly rising flames that will burn him alive unless Michael pushes him out of harm's way. Upon his release, Solomon reveals the truth about the members of the drug cartel and that Michael's father David Tapp accidentally stumbled on their operations during his search for Jigsaw. He is last seen being cornered by Pighead II and thrown into a pit of syringes. Pighead II then seals the door before Michael can enter.

=== Zeke ===
- Appears in: Saw II: Flesh & Blood
- Status: Deceased
- Died in: Saw II: Flesh & Blood

Zeke is a Jigsaw victim whose original trap mangles his hands beyond repair, stripping away much of the flesh. He is a pedophile who molested little girls. He is saved from his trap by Michael Tapp, but passes out from blood loss. Between this event and the events of the game, he has his damaged forearms replaced with large blades and becomes psychotic, chasing and attempting to kill Michael at any opportunity. Michael manages to lure him in between two spiked wall devices in front of a doorway that snap shut and crush him.
