= Janet Land =

Canadian actress

Janet Land (born 1956) is a Canadian film and television actress. She has acted in episodes of TV shows, including Goosebumps and Mayday, and several movies, including Silent Hill.

== Filmography ==
=== Film ===
| Year | Title | Role | Notes |
|---|---|---|---|
| 1989 | Destiny to Order | Nurse | |
| 1996 | Getting Away with Murder | Ferry Woman #2 | |
| 1996 | Virus | Natalie | |
| 2006 | Silent Hill | Congregation | |
| 2007 | Saw IV | Morgan | |
| 2013 | Poker Night | Diane | |
| 2019 | The Prodigy | Sarah's Mother | |
| 2020 | The Marijuana Conspiracy | Woman Watching TV | |
| TBA | North of Albany | Emma | |

=== Television ===
| Year | Title | Role | Notes |
|---|---|---|---|
| 1984 | Charlie Grant's War | Maid | Television film |
| 1990 | Street Legal | Lynn Carlyle | Episode: "Tyger, Tyger" |
| 1992 | Top Cops | Hoyt's Wife | Episode: "Nick McDonald/Jacklean Davis" |
| 1993 | JFK: Reckless Youth | Lem's Girlfriend | Miniseries |
| 1996 | Goosebumps | Evan's Mom | Episode: "Monster Blood" |
| 1998 | Real Kids, Real Adventures | Linda | Episode: "Runaway Balloon" |
| 1999 | Strange Justice | Ginni Lamp Thomas | Television film |
| 2000, 2001 | In a Heartbeat | Mrs. Powell | 2 episodes |
| 2004 | This Is Wonderland | Mary Ann Petrou | Episode #1.12 |
| 2004 | Sue Thomas: F.B.Eye | Mrs. Evans | Episode: "Adventures in Babysitting" |
| 2004 | Kink in My Hair | Jackie | Television film |
| 2005 | The Dive from Clausen's Pier | Mrs. Bell | Television film |
| 2005 | 1-800-Missing | Madeleine Cole | Episode: "Patient X" |
| 2006 | Between Truth and Lies | Principal | Television film |
| 2007, 2009 | Air Crash Investigation | Joann Cordary-Bundock | 2 episodes |
| 2008 | Little Mosque on the Prairie | Mrs. Daniels | Episode: "Lord of the Ring" |
| 2009 | The Listener | Wendy Lassiter | Episode: "Inside the Man" |
| 2015 | A Wish Come True | Barbara | Television film |
| 2019 | Titans | Mugged Woman | Episode: "Conner" |
| 2020 | The Umbrella Academy | Kitty | Episode: "The Swedish Job" |
